= List of power stations in West Bengal =

Most power plants in West Bengal are coal-based thermal power plants. In addition, there are some hydropower and gas power plants.

== Conventional ==
=== Thermal power plant ===
==== Coal ====
Sl No.	Name	Operator	Location	District	State	Sector	Region	Units	Capacity (MW)	Coordinates
1	Mejia Thermal Power Station	DVC	Durlabhpur	Bankura	West Bengal	Central	Eastern	4 x 210, 2 x 250, 2 x 500	2,340	23°27′47″N 87°07′51″E
2	Farakka Super Thermal Power Station	NTPC	Farakka	Murshidabad	West Bengal	Central	Eastern	3 x 200, 2 x 500, 1 x 500	2,100	24°46′23″N 87°53′43″E
3	Bakreshwar Thermal Power Station	WBPDCL	Dubrajpur	Birbhum	West Bengal	State	Eastern	5 x 210	1,050	23°49′43″N 87°27′06″E
4	Durgapur Steel Thermal Power Station	DVC	Durgapur	Bardhaman	West Bengal	Central	Eastern	2 x 500	1,000	23°27′47″N 87°07′51″E
5	Kolaghat Thermal Power Station	WBPDCL	Mecheda	Purba Medinipur	West Bengal	State	Eastern	6 x 210	1,260	22°24′56″N 87°52′12″E
6	Budge Budge Thermal Power Plant	CESC	Budge Budge	South 24 Paraganas	West Bengal	Private	Eastern	3 x 250	750	22°28′09″N 88°08′23″E
7	Santaldih Thermal Power Station	WBPDCL	Santaldih	Purulia	West Bengal	State	Eastern	2 x 250	500	23°36′08″N 86°28′06″E
8	DPL Thermal Power Station	WBPDCL	Durgapur	Bardhaman	West Bengal	State	Eastern	1 x 250, 1 x 110, 1 x 300	660	23°31′09″N 87°18′05″E
9	Sagardighi Thermal Power Station	WBPDCL	Manigram	Murshidabad	West Bengal	State	Eastern	2 x 300, 2 x 500	1,600	24°22′44″N 88°05′44″E
10	Bandel Thermal Power Station	WBPDCL	Tribeni	Hooghly	West Bengal	State	Eastern	2 x 60, 1 x 215	335	22°59′44″N 88°24′13″E
11	Durgapur Thermal Power Station	DVC	Durgapur	Bardhaman	West Bengal	Central	Eastern	1 x 210	210	23°31′59″N 87°15′00″E
12	CESC Southern Generating Station	CESC	Kolkata	Kolkata	West Bengal	Private	Eastern	2 x 67.5	135	22°32′58″N 88°17′29″E
13	Titagarh Thermal Power Station	CESC	Titagarh	North 24 Paraganas	West Bengal	Private	Eastern	4x60	240	
14	Raghunathpur Thermal Power Station	DVC	Raghunathpur	Purulia	West Bengal	Central	Eastern	2 x 600	1,200	
15	Haldia Energy Power Station	CESC	Haldia	Purba Medinipur	West Bengal	Private	Eastern	2 x 300	600	22°06′19″N 88°10′37″E
16	NSPCL Durgapur	NSPCL	Durgapur	Bardhaman	West Bengal	Central	Eastern	2 x 60	120	
	TOTAL								11790	

==== Gas-based ====
Power station	Operator	Location	District	State	Sector	Region	Unit wise Capacity	Installed Capacity (MW)	Plant Coordinates
Maithan GT	DVC	Maithan	Paschim Bardhaman	West Bengal	Central	Eastern	1 x 90	90	
Haldia GT	MCC PTA India Corporation Limited	Haldia	Purba Medinipur	West Bengal	Private	Eastern	1 x 40	40	
Kasba Peak Load Power Generating Station	CESC	Kasba	Kolkata	West Bengal	Private	Eastern	2 x 20	40	

== Renewable ==
=== Hydroelectric ===
Station	Operator	District	State	Region	Generator units	Capacity (MW)	Under Construction (MW)	Plant Coordinates
Rammam Hydroelectric Power Project	WBSEDCL	Darjeeling	West Bengal	Eastern	4 x 12.75	51		
Teesta Canal Fanal Hydel Project	WBSEDCL	Darjeeling	West Bengal	Eastern	3 PS x 3 x 7.5	67.5		
Teesta Low Dam Project	NHPC	Darjeeling	West Bengal	Eastern	1 x 132, 1 x 160	292		
Jaldhaka HEP	WBSEDCL	Kalimpong	West Bengal	Eastern	4 x 9, 2 x 4	44		
Sidrapong HEP	WBSEDCL	Darjeeling	West Bengal	Eastern	3 x 0.2	0.6		
Little Rangit HEP	WBSEDCL	Darjeeling	West Bengal	Eastern	2 x 0.1	2		
Fazi HEP	WBSEDCL	Darjeeling	West Bengal	Eastern	1 x 1.2	1.2		
Rinchington HEP	WBSEDCL	Darjeeling	West Bengal	Eastern	2 x 1	2		
Mungpo-Kalikhola HEP	WBSEDCL	Darjeeling	West Bengal	Eastern	3 x 1	3		
Purulia Pumped Storage	WBSEDCL	Purulia	West Bengal	Eastern	4 x 225	900		
Panchet Dam	DVC	Purulia	West Bengal	Eastern	2 x 40	80		
Maithon Dam	DVC	Paschim Bardhaman	West Bengal	Eastern	3 x 20	60		
