= Cesc =

Cesc or CESC may refer to:

- Chamundeshwari Electricity Supply Corporation, an electricity supply company in Karnataka, India
- Calcutta Electric Supply Corporation, an electricity supply company based in Kolkata, West Bengal, India
  - Dhariwal Power Station or CESC Chandrapur Thermal Power, a coal-based thermal power plant near Tadali, Maharashtra, India
  - CESC Southern Generating Station, coal-based thermal power plant in Kolkata, India
  - CESC Tunnel, an underwater tunnel in Kolkata, India
- Cesc Fàbregas, Spanish association football player
- Cesc Gay, Spanish screenwriter and director
- Cesc, Catalan comic writer and recipient of the Creus de Sant Jordi
- Corneal epithelial stem cells
