= Bokaro Thermal Power Station B =

Power station in Jharkhand, India

- Country: India
- Location: Bokaro (Thermal), Bokaro District, Jharkhand
- Coordinates: 23°47′07″N 85°52′48″E
- Status: Operational
- Commission date: 1986
- Owner: DVC

Thermal power station
- Primary fuel: Coal

Power generation
- Units operational: 3×210 MW
- Nameplate capacity: 630 MW

External links
- Website: www.dvcindia.gov.in

Bokaro Thermal Power Station B (BTPS - B) is located at Bokaro district in Jharkhand, 44 km from the Bokaro Steel City and 55 km from Dhanbad city, India. The nearest railway station is Bokaro Thermal. The power plant is one of the coal-based power plants of DVC.

== Location ==
Cities, towns and locations in Bokaro district in North Chotanagpur Division
M: municipal town, CT: census town, R: rural/ urban centre, F: Factory, A: Coal Mining Area
Abbreviation used: TPS – Thermal Power Station
Owing to space constraints in the small map, the actual locations in a larger map may vary slightly

=== Location ===
Bokaro Thermal Power Station B is located at 23°47′07″N 85°52′48″E.

=== Area overview ===
Bokaro district consists of undulating uplands on the Chota Nagpur Plateau with the Damodar River cutting a valley right across. It has an average elevation of 200 to 540 metres (660 to 1,770 ft) above mean sea level. The highest hill, Lugu Pahar, rises to a height of 1,070 metres (3,510 ft). The East Bokaro Coalfield located in the Bermo-Phusro area and small intrusions of Jharia Coalfield make Bokaro a coal rich district. In 1965, one of the largest steel manufacturing units in the country, Bokaro Steel Plant, operated by Steel Authority of India Limited, was set up at Bokaro Steel City. The Damodar Valley Corporation established its first thermal power station at Bokaro (Thermal). The 5 kilometres (3.1 mi) long, 55 metres (180 ft) high earthfill dam with composite masonry cum concrete spillway, Tenughat Dam, across the Damodar River, is operated by the Government of Jharkhand. The average annual rainfall is 1,291.2 millimetres (50.83 in). The soil is generally infertile and agriculture is mostly rain-fed.

Note: The map alongside presents some of the notable locations in the district. All places marked in the map are linked in the larger full screen map.

== Power plant ==
Bokaro Thermal Power Station B has an installed capacity of 630 MW. The First unit was commissioned in March 1986. The station is located on the banks of the Konar River near Bokaro ‘A’ Thermal Power Station. Entire power generated by the plant is supplied to DVC network.

The now defunct Bokaro ‘A’ Thermal Power Station which was the first thermal power plant of the DVC system (commissioned in 1953), was scrapped. In place of which, one 500 MW unit has been commissioned by BHEL in May 2016.

== Installed capacity ==
Unit Number	Installed Capacity (MW)	Date of Commissioning	Status
1	210	March 1986	Decommissioned
2	210	November 1990	decommissioned
3	210	August 1993	Decommissioned

The boilers are of ABL make, while the turbines and generators are of BHEL make.

== See also ==
- Chandrapura Thermal Power Station
- Durgapur Thermal Power Station
- Mejia Thermal Power Station
