= Petarwar =

- Village
- Location in Jharkhand, India Petarwar (India)
- Coordinates: 23.621389°N 85.851333°E
- Country: India
- State: Jharkhand
- District: Bokaro

Population (2011)
  - Total: 5,060

Languages
  - Official: Hindi
- Time zone: UTC+5:30 (IST)
- PIN: 829121 (Petarwar)
- Telephone/STD code: 06549
- Vehicle registration: JH-09
- Lok Sabha constituency: Giridih
- Vidhan Sabha constituency: Gomia
- Website: bokaro.nic.in

Petarwar (also spelled Petarbar, Peterbar, Peterwar) is a village in the Petarwar CD block in the Bermo subdivision of the Bokaro district in the Indian state of Jharkhand.

== Geography ==
Cities, towns and locations in Bokaro district in North Chotanagpur Division
M: municipal town, CT: census town, R: rural/ urban centre, F: Factory, A: Coal Mining Area
Abbreviation used: TPS – Thermal Power Station
Owing to space constraints in the small map, the actual locations in a larger map may vary slightly

=== Location ===
Petarwar is located at 23.621389°N 85.851333°E.

=== Area overview ===
Bokaro district consists of undulating uplands on the Chota Nagpur Plateau with the Damodar River cutting a valley right across. It has an average elevation of 200 to 540 metres (660 to 1,770 ft) above mean sea level. The highest hill, Lugu Pahar, rises to a height of 1,070 metres (3,510 ft). The East Bokaro Coalfield located in the Bermo-Phusro area and small intrusions of Jharia Coalfield make Bokaro a coal rich district. In 1965, one of the largest steel manufacturing units in the country, Bokaro Steel Plant, operated by Steel Authority of India Limited, was set-up at Bokaro Steel City. The Damodar Valley Corporation established its first thermal power station at Bokaro (Thermal). The 5 kilometres (3.1 mi) long, 55 metres (180 ft) high earthfill dam with composite masonry cum concrete spillway, Tenughat Dam, across the Damodar River, is operated by the Government of Jharkhand. The average annual rainfall is 1,291.2 millimetres (50.83 in). The soil is generally infertile and agriculture is mostly rain-fed.

The region is dominated by Shorea robusta (Sal, Sakhua), the state tree of Jharkhand, thriving abundantly in Petarwar Block. The forest department in Petarwar Block is home to a large number of these trees.

Petarwar is also renowned for its vibrant weekly markets, held every Saturday and Tuesday. The Saturday market is particularly significant, offering a wide range of goods including vegetables, animals, fish, cows, goats, and other small animals. People from a 15 km radius flock to this bustling market to buy and sell their wares, making it a central hub of activity and commerce.

Note: The map alongside presents some of the notable locations in the district. All places marked in the map are linked in the larger full screen map.

== Demographics ==
According to the 2011 Census of India, Petarbar had a total population of 5,060, of which 2,677 (53%) were males and 2,383 (47%) were females. Population in the age range 0–6 years was 615. The total number of literate persons in Petarbar was 3,351 (87.85% of the population over 6 years).

== Civic administration ==
=== Police station ===
Petarwar police station is located at Thana Road Petarwar. It is around 250 metres from Tenu Chowk.

=== CD block HQ ===
The headquarters of Petarwar CD block are located at Petarwar.

=== Postal service ===
Petarwar comes under Giridih Postal Division (Jharkhand Circle) and has the pincode 829121.

== Transport ==
NH 320 passes through Petarwar. It is very well connected in terms of road. Tenu chowk connects the NH 320 to Tenughat Dam and Gomia. The nearest railway station is Gomia Railway station at 27 km, along with Bokaro steel city at around 30 km.
