= Jaridih Bazar =

- Census Town
- Location in Jharkhand, India Jaridih Bazar (India)
- Coordinates: 23.7685°N 85.9361°E
- Country: India
- State: Jharkhand
- District: Bokaro

Area
  - Total: 11.30 km^{2} (4.36 sq mi)
- Elevation: 256 m (840 ft)

Population (2011)
  - Total: 31,882
  - Density: 2,821/km^{2} (7,307/sq mi)

Languages
  - Official: Hindi, Urdu
- Time zone: UTC+5:30 (IST)
- Telephone/STD code: 06549
- Vehicle registration: JH 09
- Lok Sabha constituency: Giridih
- Vidhan Sabha constituency: Bermo
- Website: bokaro.nic.in

Jaridih Bazar is a census town in the Bermo CD block in the Bermo subdivision of the Bokaro district in the Jharkhand state, India.

== Geography ==
Cities, towns and locations in Bokaro district in North Chotanagpur Division
M: municipal town, CT: census town, R: rural/ urban centre, F: Factory, A: Coal Mining Area
Abbreviation used: TPS – Thermal Power Station
Owing to space constraints in the small map, the actual locations in a larger map may vary slightly

=== Location ===
Jaridih Bazar is located at 23.7637600°N 85.9295730°E.

It is on the banks of Damodar River, a little above its point of confluence with Konar River.

=== Area overview ===
Bokaro district consists of undulating uplands on the Chota Nagpur Plateau with the Damodar River cutting a valley right across. It has an average elevation of 200 to 540 metres (660 to 1,770 ft) above mean sea level. The highest hill, Lugu Pahar, rises to a height of 1,070 metres (3,510 ft). The East Bokaro Coalfield located in the Bermo-Phusro area and small intrusions of Jharia Coalfield make Bokaro a coal rich district. In 1965, one of the largest steel manufacturing units in the country, Bokaro Steel Plant, operated by Steel Authority of India Limited, was set-up at Bokaro Steel City. The Damodar Valley Corporation established its first thermal power station at Bokaro (Thermal). The 5 kilometres (3.1 mi) long, 55 metres (180 ft) high earthfill dam with composite masonry cum concrete spillway, Tenughat Dam, across the Damodar River, is operated by the Government of Jharkhand. The average annual rainfall is 1,291.2 millimetres (50.83 in). The soil is generally infertile and agriculture is mostly rain-fed.

Note: The map alongside presents some of the notable locations in the district. All places marked in the map are linked in the larger full screen map.

== Demographics ==
According to the 2011 Census of India, Jaridih Bazar had a total population of 31,882, of which 16,642 (52%) were males and 15,242 (48%) were females. Population in the age range 0–6 years was 4,025. The total number of literate persons in Jaridih Bazar was 22,007 (79.00% of the population over 6 years).

According to the 2011 Census of India, Phusro Urban Agglomeration had a total population of 186,139, of which males were 97,665 and females 88,874. Phusro Urban Agglomeration is composed of Phusro (NP), Bermo (CT), Jaridih Bazar (CT), Bokaro (CT) and Kurpania (CT).

As of 2001 India census, Jaridih Bazar had a population of 30,091. Males constitute 54% of the population and females 46%. Jaridih Bazar has an average literacy rate of 64%, higher than the national average of 59.5%: male literacy is 73%, and female literacy is 53%. In Jaridih Bazar, 14% of the population is under 6 years of age.

== Infrastructure ==
According to the District Census Handbook 2011, Bokaro, Jaridih Bazar covered an area of 11.30 km^{2}. Among the civic amenities, it had 31 km roads with open drains, the protected water supply involved tap water from treated and untreated sources, overhead tank. It had 5,676 domestic electric connections, 300 road lighting points. Among the medical facilities, it had 4 hospitals, 2 dispensaries, 2 health centres, 1 family welfare centre, 4 maternity and child welfare centres, 1 maternity home, 1 nursing home, 9 medicine shops. Among the educational facilities it had 11 primary schools, 9 middle schools, 6 secondary schools, the nearest senior secondary school at Bermo 6 km away, 1 general degree college. It had 5 non-formal educational centres (Sarva Siksha Abhiyan). Among the social, recreational and cultural facilities it had 36 auditorium/ community halls, 1 public library, 1 reading room. Two important commodities it produced were coal and furniture. It had the branch office of 3 nationalised banks, 1 cooperative bank, 2 non-agricultural credit societies.
