= Durgapur Thermal Power Station =

Power station in West Bengal, India

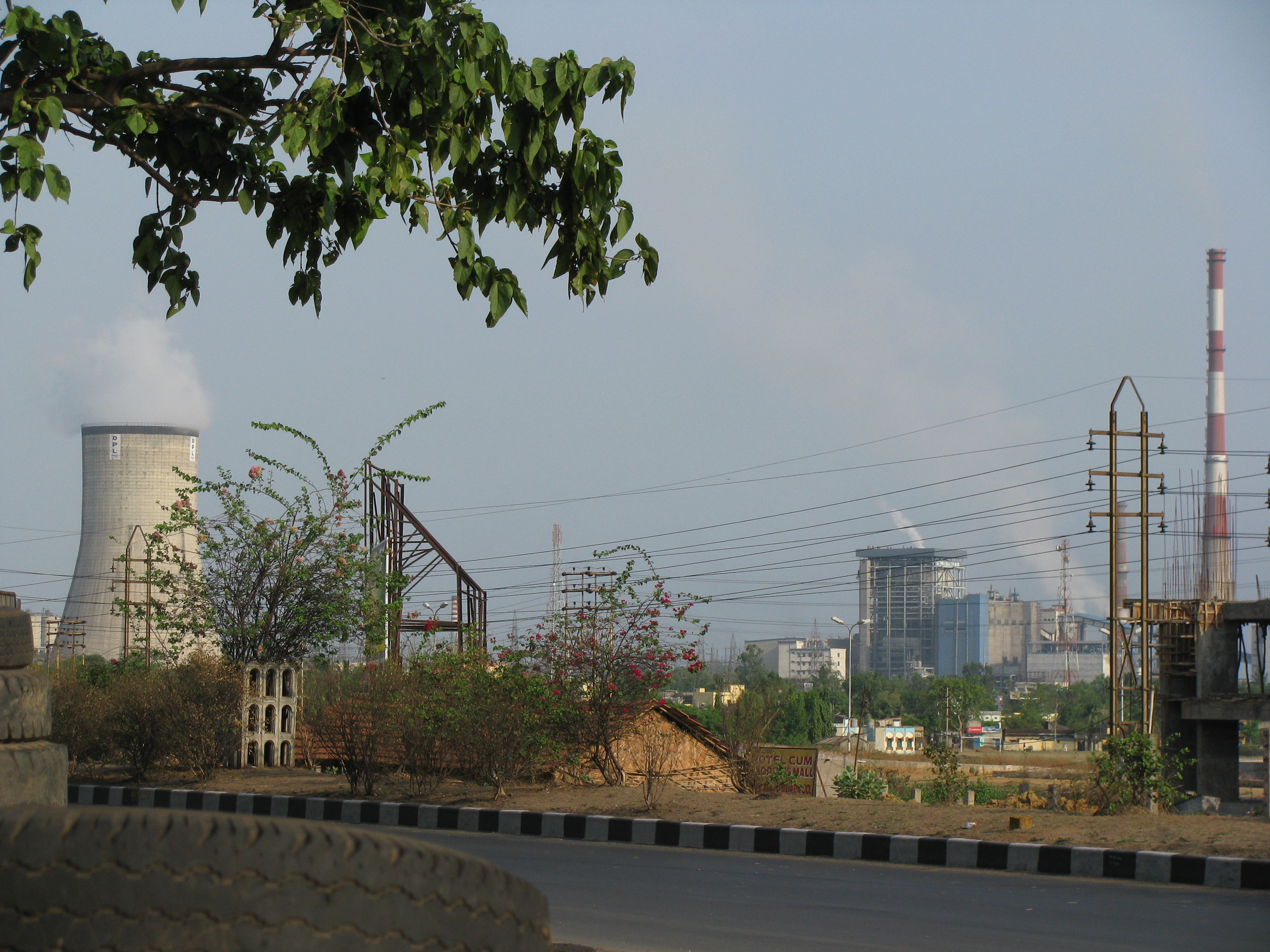
- Country: India
- Location: Durgapur, Burdwan, West Bengal
- Coordinates: 23°31′52″N 87°15′01″E
- Status: Operational
- Commission date: 1966
- Decommission date: 2023
- Owner: DVC
- Operator: Damodar Valley Corporation

Thermal power station
- Primary fuel: Coal

Power generation
- Units operational: 350.00 MW
- Nameplate capacity: 210 MW

External links
- Website: www.dvcindia.org

Durgapur Thermal Power Station is located near Waria Railway Station, 6 km from Durgapur railway station in West Bengal. The power plant is one of the coal based power plants of DVC.

== Power plant ==
DTPS was set up in the 1960s with two 75 MW units and one 140 MW unit in the first stage. Another 210 MW unit was added to the plant in the early 1980s to augment supplies to the growing industrial demand. The first 2 units of the Station had to be de-commissioned after a fire accident in 1985.

== Installed capacity ==
Stage	Unit Number	Installed Capacity (MW)	Date of Commissioning	Status
First	1	75	NA	Closed
First	2	75	NA	Closed
First	3	140	December 1966	Closed
Second	4	220 (Output 210)	September 1982	Closed

U#3 has ABL make boilers and GE make turbine-generators, while U#4 has boiler, turbine and generator are of BHEL make.

== See also ==
- Chandrapura Thermal Power Station
- Bokaro Thermal Power Station B
- Mejia Thermal Power Station
- Durgapur Steel Thermal Power Station
- Raghunathpur Thermal Power Station
- Koderma Thermal Power Station
