= OSSICS =

OSSICS, an acronym for Open Software Solutions Industrial Cooperative Society Limited, is the first business enterprise for software development in the co-operative sector of Kerala, India. OSSICS was started in the year 1998 and has its head office in Ernakulam in Kerala. The co-operative society began working with a team of 11 software professionals. Currently, it has a strength of nearly 60 professionals. Its members include engineers, revenue-model experts and economy advisers.

Along with Cochin University of Science and Technology, IT@School Project of Government of Kerala and the Appropriate Technology Promotion Society in Kochi, OSSICS was one of the organisers of the National Free Software Conference 2008 held in Cochin University of Science and Technology during 15–16 November 2008.

All products and services offered by OSSICS are in the GPL software platforms.

== Services ==
Services provided by OSSICS include consultancy in business process reengineering, content generation for building up information systems, system software development for Linux environments, porting of existing applications to Linux, database services based on PostgreSQL and MySQL, and software development for web-portal systems based on Linux, Apache, PHP, and PostgreSQL/MySQL.

== Products ==
OSSICS owns one of the largest client base in Kerala in the free software sector. The flagship product is Sanghamitra, an open source software targeted at the cooperative banks and societies in Kerala.

=== Smart Asset ===
Smart Asset is a package designed as a Fixed Assets Management System which captures the complete life-cycle from estimation to scrap sale. Within an enterprise, this software integrates the functions of the planning wing, the operations and maintenance wing and the audit and accounting wing into a single database. This product has been implemented in the Ernakulam Secondary Switching Area of Bharat Sanchar Nigam Limited.

=== Collection Manager ===
Collection Counter is a package designed as a Collection Counter Management System and it provides a front-end interface for bill collection and integrates the back-end to existing legacy systems. The Ernakulam Central Telegraph Office of Bharat Sanchar Nigam Limited currently uses this package.

=== ERP@Printmedia ===
ERP@Printmedia is a package designed to take care of all activities related to print media like circulation, advertisement, printing, publishing, store, etc. The newspaper Prajasakti Sahiti Samastha of Andhra Pradesh has implemented this package.

=== Sanghamitra ===
Sanghamitra, a Core banking system, is a package intended for the cooperative sector. Some of the prominent clients of this package include P&T and BSNL Employees Credit Societies in Kerala, Central Excise Employees' Credit Society, Ernakulam, and Government Servants' Employees Cooperative bank, Kollam.

=== Kairali SCADA ===
SCADA stands for "Supervisory Control and data Acquisition Plant Monitoring System". This operates as a system for monitoring sensors, displaying data by providing a human-machine interface for plant operations. It has been implemented at the Super Thermal Power Plant at National Thermal Power Corporation, Talchar. Mejia Thermal Power Station (MTPS) of Damodar Valley Corporationat West Bengal.
