= Salboni Thermal Power Station =

Coal-fired power station under construction in West Bengal, India

- Country: India
- Location: Salboni, Paschim Medinipur district, West Bengal
- Coordinates: 22.575192°N 87.308961°E
- Status: Under construction
- Construction began: April 2025
- Construction cost: ₹16,000 crore (US$2 billion)
- Owner: JSW Energy
- Operator: JSW Thermal Energy Limited

Thermal power station
- Primary fuel: Coal

Power generation
- Units operational: 2 × 800 MW (Phase I)
- Make and model: Toshiba JSW Power Systems
- Nameplate capacity: 1.6 GW (Phase I)

Salboni Thermal Power Station is a coal‑fired thermal power station under construction in Salboni, Paschim Medinipur district, West Bengal, India. The project is being developed by JSW Thermal Energy Limited, a wholly owned subsidiary of JSW Energy.In its first phase, 2 units of 800 MW (1600 MW) are under construction on a 33,000-acre site with potential for up to 3,200 MW.

== History ==
In 2007, JSW purchased the Salboni site for a proposed 10 million tonne steel plant that would have had a captive 1,600 MW power plant. The steel project was ultimately shelved, but the site with about 3,800 acres with a 44-kilometre wall, stayed with the firm.

In 2025, the power project was revived. JSW Energy signed a power purchase agreement (PPA) with WBSEDCL for 1600 MW greenfield thermal power plant at Salboni. In early 2026, it signed a second PPA, bringing the planned capacity to 3,200 MW. The foundation stone of the first phase was laid in April 2025. A second PPA for an identical 1,600 MW unit was signed in early 2026, raising the planned capacity at the site to 3,200 MW. The foundation stone for the first phase was laid in April 2025.

== Installed capacity ==
Following is the unit‑wise capacity of the plant under Phase I and the planned expansion:

Phase	Unit Number	Installed Capacity (MW)	Status
I	1	800	Under construction
I	2	800	Under construction
II (planned)	3	800	Announced
II (planned)	4	800	Announced

The two units of Phase I each have a capacity of 800 MW and are based on ultra‑supercritical technology. Phase II, also comprising two 800 MW units, is subject to regulatory approvals and fuel tie‑ups.

== Key features ==
The plant will use domestic coal in accordance with the SHAKTI B (iv) policy. The full Phase I power capacity will be supplied via 25-year PPA signed with WBSEDCL. Toshiba JSW Power Systems, an associate company of JSW Energy, is supplying the steam turbine generators for units 1 and 2, each with a capacity of 800 MW.

The total investment for Phase I will be approximately ₹16,000 crore. Once the capacity is doubled to 3,200MW, the total investment will be approximately ₹40,000 crore.

== Employment and local development ==
During construction, the project will create employment for about 5,000 people, while 800–1,000 workers will be required for operations. A skill development centre is also planned to train local youth.

== See also ==
- JSW Energy
- List of power stations in West Bengal
