= Kamakhkhi Prasad Chattopadhyay =

- Born: 27 March 1917; Kolkata, India
- Died: 30 May 1976 (aged 59)
- Citizenship: India
- Occupation: Writer
- Writing career
- Notable awards: Bankim Puroshkar

Kamakhkhi Prasad Chattopadhyay (27 March 1917 – 30 May 1976) was an Indian poet. His father Basanta kumar Chattopadhyay served as the first auditor general of Independent India.

== Education ==
Kamakhkhi passed his BA exam and awarded Bankim puroshkar for being first in the BA exam.

== Career ==
He worked as the assistant of Sudhindra Nath Dutta in Damodar Valley Corporation. He spent most of his job life in Mumbai, Delhi and Moscow. He stayed in Moscow for 3 years. During his stay in Moscow, he translated Russian books into Bengali. He was a photographer also. He was editor of the children magazine Rangmashal.

== Notable work ==
Some of his notable books are Mainak, Eka, Chayamurti, Shetchakra, Sonar Kopat, Shoshane Bosonto, Ghanashamer ghora, Paruldi etc. Some of his work published under the name Krittibas Ojha.
