= Durgapur Barrage =

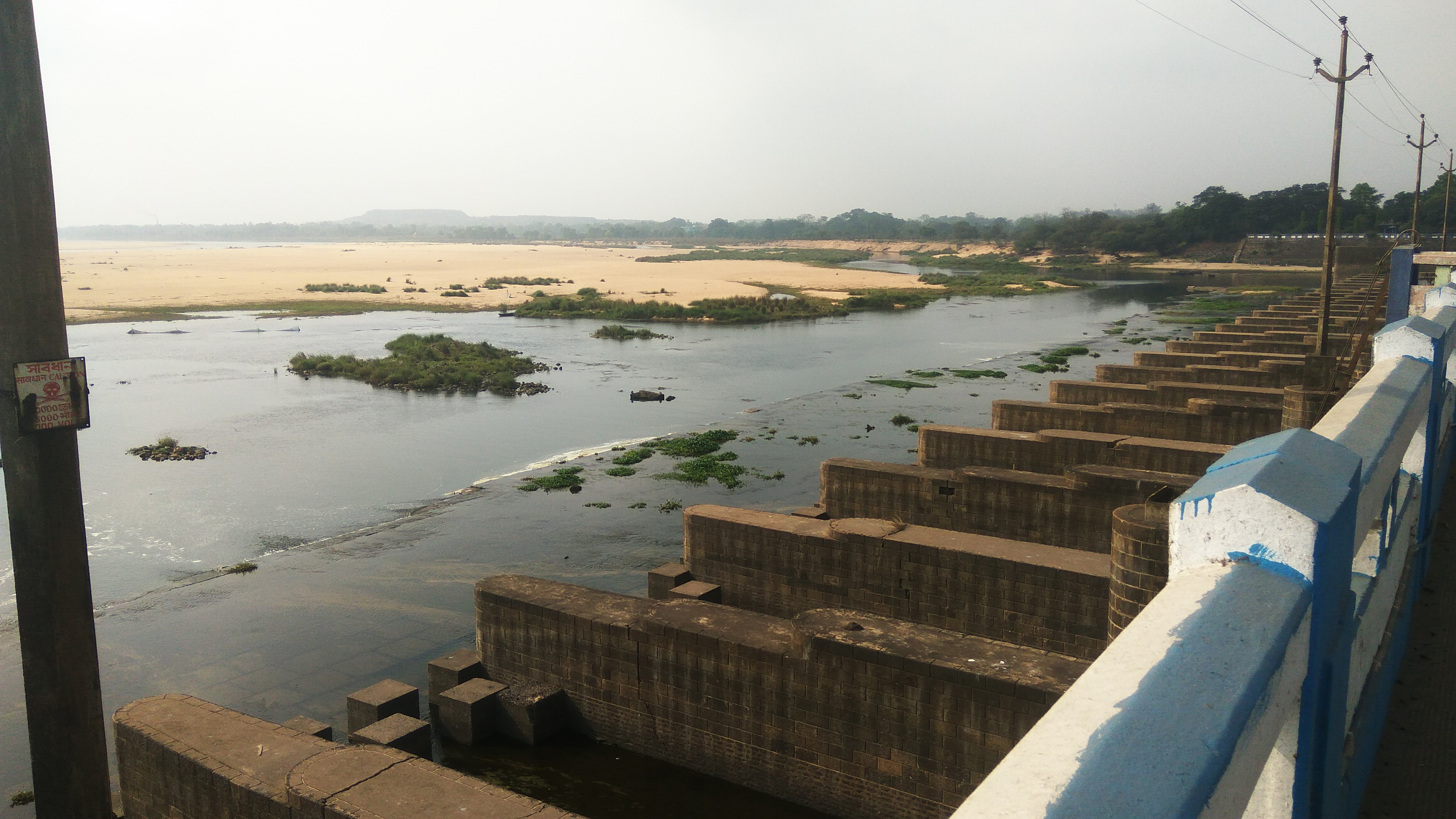
- Downstream view
- Interactive map of Durgapur Barrage
- Country: India
- Location: Burdwan district, West Bengal
- Coordinates: 23.4754°N 87.3023°E
- Purpose: Irrigation
- Construction began: 1953
- Opening date: 1955
- Operator: Government of West Bengal

Dam and spillways
- Type of dam: Barrage
- Impounds: Damodar River
- Height: 12 metres (39 ft)
- Length: 692.2 metres (2,271 ft)
- Spillways: 34
- Spillway type: Vertical lift gate

Reservoir
- Maximum water depth: 64.48 m (211.5 ft)

Durgapur Barrage is built across the Damodar River in Bankura district and partly in Paschim Bardhaman district, in the Indian state of West Bengal. It was constructed by Damodar Valley Corporation mainly for the purpose of irrigation and also to supply water to Industrial township of Durgapur. The irrigation and canal system was transferred to the Government of West Bengal in 1964.

== Overview ==
The Damodar River Valley Project on the Damodar river and its principal tributary, the Konar river, is located in eastern India. The four main multipurpose dams located at Tilaiya, Konar, Maithon and Panchet were commissioned during 1953–1959. In addition, a single purpose reservoir on the main stream, the Damodar, at Tenughat was constructed later in 1974. While the four earlier dams are controlled by Damodar Valley Corporation, Tenughat Dam is controlled by the Government of Jharkhand. Durgapur Barrage, constructed downstream of all the dams, is controlled by the Government of West Bengal. Durgapur Barrage and the canal network, was handed over to the Government of West Bengal in 1964.

In 1932, the Anderson weir was constructed at Randiha. As a result, irrigation facility has been available in the lower Damodar basin before the advent of dams by means of the diversion weir on the Damodar River and Eden canal. It is about 19 kilometres (12 mi) downstream of Durgapur Barrage.

== The barrage ==
Durgapur Barrage constructed in 1955 is 692 metres (2,270 ft) long. It has 34 gates (including under sluice). The size of gates are 18.3 m × 4.9 m (60 ft × 16 ft). The size of left and right under sluices are 18.3 m × 5.5 m (60 ft × 18 ft). Durgapur Barrage is 12 metres (39 ft) high.

== The canals ==
The length of left bank main canal, originating from Durgapur Barrage, is 136.8 km (85.0 mi) and that of the right bank main canal is 88.5 km (55.0 mi). Discharge at head regulator for left bank canal is 260 cubic metres (69,000 US gal) per second and that for right bank canal is 64.3 cubic metres (17,000 US gal) per second. The total length of main and branch canals is 2,494 kilometres (1,550 mi).

== Location map ==
Cities and towns in the southern and eastern portions of Durgapur subdivision in Paschim Bardhaman district
MC: Municipal Corporation, CT: census town, R: rural centre, A: airport, B: barrage, H: historical site
Owing to space constraints in the small map, the actual locations in a larger map may vary slightly

== Durgapur water crisis ==
In the night 23 November 2017, the 1st lock gate of the Durgapur Barrage was opened for some time to let the water out. After the completion of the work the gate were being lowered when the gate got tilted and was bent. The entire water from the reservoir kept flowing out and it triggered massive water crisis as the entire Durgapur city, its large scale industries and the farm areas till the Bardhaman district are solely dependent on this single water source. The news of the tragedy was conveyed to all next morning, which caused much concern among everyone in the city. The mayor of Durgapur urged for immediate action from Government of West Bengal following which Govt. of West Bengal sent a team of engineers to resolve the issue. Massive water scarcity had hit the Durgapur city and its adjoining areas. Electricity production was hampered. All the water contained in the reservoir was emptied and then the engineers worked all day and night and after few days the glitch was fixed by choking the lock gate region. Waters from Maithon and Panchet dams were released to fill the reservoir for supply of water. For permanent solution a new lock gate was required to be installed. To accomplish the task the engineers again wanted to empty the reservoir and later fill it up with waters from Maithon and Panchet dams yet again. This time Maithon dam expressed its inability to do so because sufficient amount of water was not available to them too. Following this a floating platform was brought to Durgapur. Using that floating platform, the lock gate was permanently fixed in phase wise manner.

The incident forced authorities to look for an alternative water source for supply of water in wake of such circumstances. Considerations are being made. A water body called Nachan Dam was selected for this purpose. Its viability and efficiency of water supply is currently being examined.

On October 31, 2020, the 31st gate of the barrage got bent because of pressure exerted by water, leading to a massive water outflow. The officials of West Burdwan and Bankura administration worry that the incident could trigger a scarcity of drinking water in both districts due to the unavailability of water in the upper catchment area. The superintendent engineer of Damodar irrigation circle is hopeful to repair or replace the gate within 48 hours as they need the upper catchment area dry to carry out the work.
