= Mejia Thermal Power Station =

Power station in West Bengal, India

- Country: India
- Location: Durlovpur, Mejia, Bankura, West Bengal
- Coordinates: 23°27′37″N 87°08′05″E
- Status: Operational
- Commission date: 1996
- Owner: DVC
- Operator: Damodar Valley Corporation

Thermal power station
- Primary fuel: Coal

Power generation
- Units operational: 4×210 MW (Units 1–4); 2×250 MW (Units 5–6); 2×500 MW (Units 7–8)
- Nameplate capacity: 2340 MW

External links
- Website: www.dvc.gov.in

Mejia Thermal Power Station is located at Durlabhpur, Bankura, 35 km from Durgapur city in West Bengal. The power plant is one of the coal based power plants of DVC. Commissioned in 1996, MTPS is the largest thermal power plant, in terms of generating capacity in the state of West Bengal as well as among other DVC power plants.

== Power Plant ==
Mejia Thermal Power Station has an installed capacity of 2340 MW. The plant has 8 units under operation. The individual units has the generating capacity as follows:

Unit No.	Generating Capacity	Commissioned on
U#1	210 MW	Mar. 1996
U#2	210 MW	Mar. 1998
U#3	210 MW	Sep. 1999
U#4	210 MW	Feb. 2005
U#5	250 MW	Feb. 2008
U#6	250 MW	Sep. 2008
U#7	500 MW	Aug. 2011
U#8	500 MW	Aug. 2012

Units 1 through 6 are collectively named MTPS- A, while the extension work of 2×500 MW Units 7 & 8 are called MTPS-B. All the units have BHEL make boilers, turbines and generators installed in them.

== See also ==
- List of power stations in West Bengal
- Chandrapura Thermal Power Station
- Bokaro Thermal Power Station B
- Durgapur Thermal Power Station
