= Black Diamond Express =

Train in India

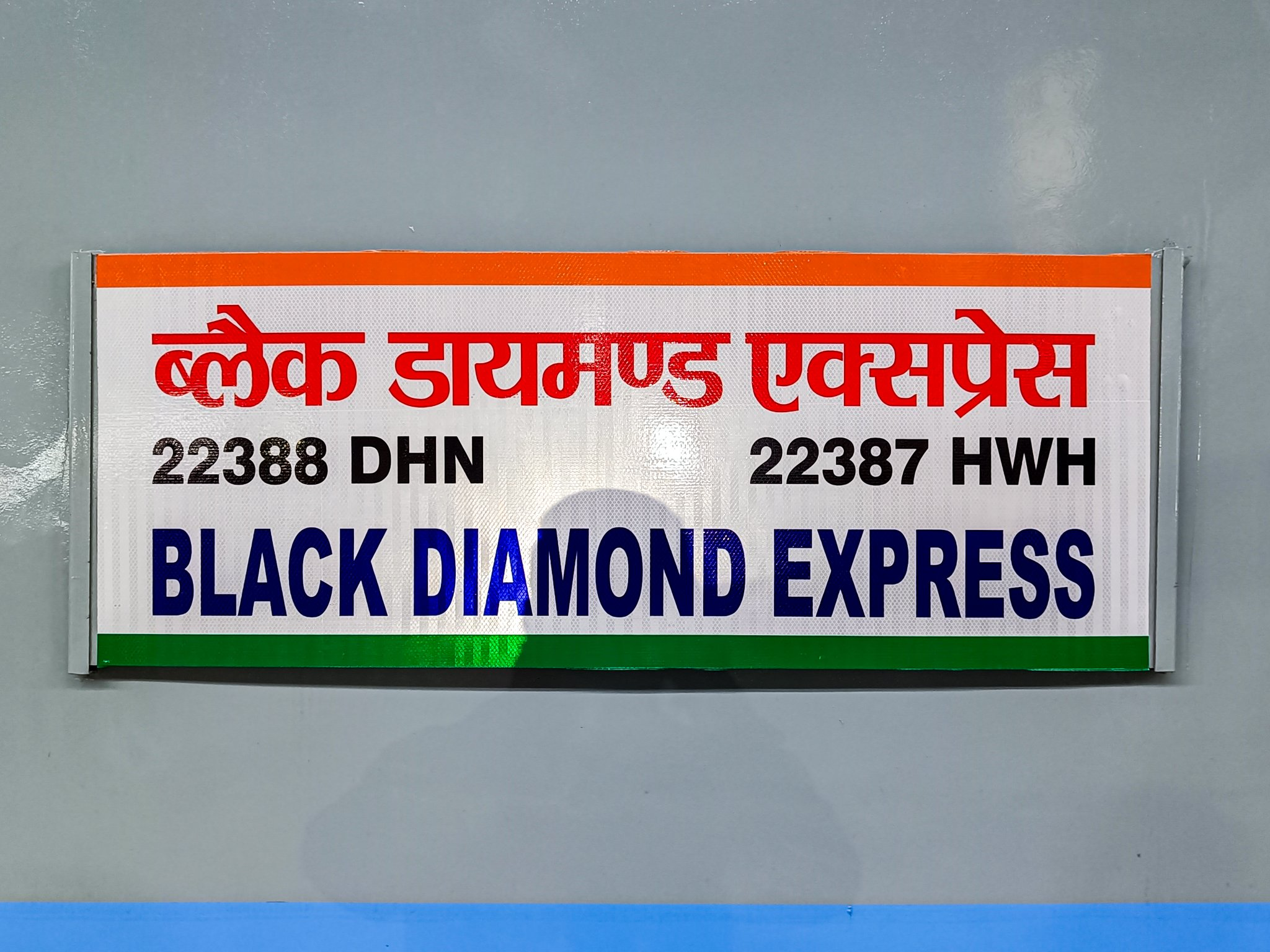
- Black Diamond Express train board.

Overview
- Service type: Superfast
- Locale: West Bengal & Jharkhand
- First service: 1964; 62 years ago
- Current operator: East Central Railway

Route
- Termini: Howrah (HWH); Dhanbad (DHN)
- Stops: 14
- Distance travelled: 271 km (168 mi)
- Average journey time: 5 hours
- Service frequency: Daily
- Train number: 22387 / 22388

On-board services
- Classes: General Unreserved, Second Seating, AC Chair Car
- Seating arrangements: Yes
- Sleeping arrangements: No
- Auto-rack arrangements: Overhead racks
- Catering facilities: E-catering
- Observation facilities: Large windows
- Baggage facilities: Available
- Other facilities: Below the seats

Technical
- Rolling stock: LHB coach
- Track gauge: 1,676 mm (5 ft 6 in)
- Operating speed: 54 km/h (34 mph) average including halts.

The 22387 / 22388 Black Diamond Express is a daily superfast passenger train that connects the city of Dhanbad in Jharkhand to the capital of West Bengal, Kolkata. It acts as a sister train / twin train to the Howrah – Dhanbad Coalfield Express. Initially, the train was inaugurated as 13317 / 13318 Howrah – Dhanbad Black Diamond Express. However, with the upgrading of this train to the superfast category, the train numbering was changed to 22387 / 22388.

== History ==
Due to the proximity of Dhanbad, the coal capital of India, to key coal and industrial regions in West Bengal (Asansol, Raniganj, Andal, Waria, Durgapur) and its closeness to Kolkata, a large number of passengers travel this route daily. However, with population growth and industrial expansion, the sole superfast connection, the Howrah–Dhanbad Coalfield Express, couldn't meet rising demand. As a result, a new train was truly needed.

In response, the Howrah–Asansol Fast Passenger, inaugurated around 1954, was extended to Dhanbad in 1964, and renamed the Dhanbad Express. It later became the Black Diamond Express around 1970.

The Black Diamond Express serves as a counterpart to the Coalfield Express but is operated by East Central Railway, while the Coalfield Express is managed by Eastern Railway. The Black Diamond Express runs on the Howrah – Barddhaman Main line, unlike the Coalfield Express, which uses the Howrah – Barddhaman Chord line. Additionally, the Black Diamond Express operates in the morning, complementing the evening Coalfield Express.

== Service ==
The 22387 (HWH – DHN) departs Howrah at 06:15 and arrives in Dhanbad at 11:18, while the 22388 (DHN – HWH) departs Dhanbad at 16:20 and arrives in Howrah at 21:30, thereby traversing a distance of 271 km in around 5 hours, with an average speed of 54 km/h (34 mph) and maximum permissible speed of 130 km/h (81 mph).

En route, the train stops at:

- Seoraphuli Jn
- Bandel Jn
- Barddhaman Jn
- Mankar
- Panagarh
- Durgapur
- Waria
- Andal Jn
- Raniganj
- Asansol Jn
- Sitarampur Jn
- Kulti
- Barakar
- Kumardubi

== Coach composition ==
The train has been converted to LHB rake, from DHN w.e.f 25.03.2025 and from HWH w.e.f 26.03.2025. The current coach composition is:

- SLR – 1
- GS – 10
- 2S – 6
- CC – 2
- EOG – 1

(Total = 20 LHB coaches)

Earlier, the train used to be equipped with 22 ICF coaches, which included:

- Two air-conditioned chair car coaches (C1 – C2)
- Four non-air-conditioned chair car coaches (D1 – D4)
- Thirteen unreserved general coaches (GS / UR)
- One unreserved ladies coach (LDS / UR)
- Two seating cum luggage cars (SLR)

== Traction ==
The train is hauled by a Howrah Loco Shed-based WAP-7 electric locomotive from end to end.

== See also ==
- Howrah Junction railway station
- Dhanbad Junction railway station
- Coalfield Express
- Agnibina Express
- Asansol Intercity Express
- Hool Express
