= Maithon Gas Turbine Station =

Maithon Gas Turbine Station is a gas-based thermal power plant located at Maithon in Dhanbad district in the Indian state of Jharkhand. The power plant is owned Damodar Valley Corporation.

== Capacity ==
It has an installed capacity of 82.5 MW.

Unit No.	Generating Capacity	Turbine Type	Commissioned on	Status
1	27.5 MW	Gas Turbine	1989 October	Running
2	27.5 MW	Gas Turbine	1989 October	Running
3	27.5 MW	Gas Turbine	1989 October	Running
