= Gomia =

Gomia Gumia
- Census Town
- Location in Jharkhand, India Gomia (India)
- Coordinates: 23.8106°N 85.8232°E
- Country: India
- State: Jharkhand
- District: Bokaro

Area
  - Total: 26.11 km^{2} (10.08 sq mi)
- Elevation: 238 m (781 ft)

Population (2011)
  - Total: 48,141
  - Density: 1,844/km^{2} (4,775/sq mi)

Languages
  - Official: Hindi, Urdu
- Time zone: UTC+5:30 (IST)
- PIN: 829112
- Telephone/STD code: 06544
- Vehicle registration: JH 09
- Lok Sabha constituency: Giridih
- Vidhan Sabha constituency: Gomia
- Website: bokaro.nic.in

Gomia (also spelled as Gumia) is a census town in the Gomia CD block in the Bermo subdivision of the Bokaro district in the Indian state of Jharkhand. The modern name is a transformation of Gumia over the years. Though, today, it is still listed as Gumia by the South Eastern Railway (India) (station code GMIA).

== History ==
Gomia took shape around the year 1956, when the Imperial Chemical Industries (ICI as its popularly known as), set up a commercial explosives (IEL) factory there. It was developed together a residential colony to house the 3500 employees that would work in the factory. Since then, Gomia has been known as an example of diversity - with people of different nationalities, cultures and religious beliefs coming together to write a new chapter in the history of the then Hazaribagh district. Since the late 1950s, it has switched districts twice, first becoming a part of Giridih and then becoming a part of Bokaro district.

In mid-1999, the IEL factory was acquired by Orica.

== Geography ==
Cities, towns and locations in Bokaro district in North Chotanagpur Division
M: municipal town, CT: census town, R: rural/ urban centre, F: Factory, A: Coal Mining Area
Abbreviation used: TPS – Thermal Power Station
Owing to space constraints in the small map, the actual locations in a larger map may vary slightly

=== Location ===
Gumia is located at 23.8106°N 85.8232°E. It has an average elevation of 238 metres (780 feet) and lies within the deciduous forests of Chota Nagpur Plateau

=== Area overview ===
Bokaro district consists of undulating uplands on the Chota Nagpur Plateau with the Damodar River cutting a valley right across. It has an average elevation of 200 to 540 metres (660 to 1,770 ft) above mean sea level. The highest hill, Lugu Pahar, rises to a height of 1,070 metres (3,510 ft). The East Bokaro Coalfield located in the Bermo-Phusro area and small intrusions of Jharia Coalfield make Bokaro a coal rich district. In 1965, one of the largest steel manufacturing units in the country, Bokaro Steel Plant, operated by Steel Authority of India Limited, was set-up at Bokaro Steel City. The Damodar Valley Corporation established its first thermal power station at Bokaro (Thermal). The 5 kilometres (3.1 mi) long, 55 metres (180 ft) high earthfill dam with composite masonry cum concrete spillway, Tenughat Dam, across the Damodar River, is operated by the Government of Jharkhand. The average annual rainfall is 1,291.2 millimetres (50.83 in). The soil is generally infertile and agriculture is mostly rain-fed.

Note: The map alongside presents some of the notable locations in the district. All places marked in the map are linked in the larger full screen map.

== Civic administration ==
=== Police station ===
There are two police stations in Gomia, the Gomia police station is located at Gomia 829111 and the I.E.L. Police station 829112 on the other side of the Gomia block.

== Demographics ==
According to the 2011 Census of India, Gumia had a total population of 48,141, of which 25,119 (52%) were males and 23,022 (48%) were females. Population in the age range 0-6 years was 5,939. The total number of literate persons in Gumia was 38,968 (92.34% of the population over 6 years).

As of 2001 India census, Gumia had a population of 45,532. Males constitute 53% of the population and females 47%. Gumia has an average literacy rate of 64%, higher than the national average of 59.5%: male literacy is 74%, and female literacy is 52%. In Gumia, 14% of the population is under 6 years of age.

== Infrastructure ==
According to the District Census Handbook 2011, Bokaro, Gomia covered an area of 26.11 km^{2}. Among the civic amenities, it had 25 km roads with both open and closed drains, the protected water supply involved tap water from treated sources, hand pumps, overhead tank. It had 8,453 domestic electric connections, 50 road lighting points. Among the medical facilities, it had 1 hospital, 7 dispensaries, 7 health centres, 1 family welfare centre, 70 maternity and child welfare centres, 70 maternity homes, 8 nursing homes, no medicine shop. Among the educational facilities it had 27 primary schools, 16 middle schools, 4 secondary schools, 3 senior secondary schools, the nearest general degree college at Swang 2 km away. Among the social, recreational and cultural facilities it had 2 auditorium/ community halls, 1 public library, 1 reading room. One important commodity it produced was explosives. It had the branch offices of 1 nationalised bank, 1 private commercial bank, 1 cooperative bank.

== Transport ==
Roads are well connected with Petarbar, Phusro and Vishugarh making it easy to reach from various important cities of state. Gomia Railway station is equipped with up to date infrastructure having neat and clean platforms and is well connected with coal sites of various washeries enabling the railway enhanced revenue from coal transport.

Gumia railway station is connected to Kolkata, Bhopal, Jabalpur, by direct trains. It lies on the Barkakana-Gomoh line. Large numbers of buses ply between Gomia and neighbouring cities like Ranchi, Jamshedpur, Dhanbad, Bokaro, and Hazaribagh. And also Buses to North Bihar cities ply from Gomia.

== Tourism ==
Tenughat Dam gathers the beauty of nature. It is the largest dam of Asia, made up of soil barrier. Konar Dam is about 20 km from Gomia.

Lugu buru ghantabadi dhoromgadh is the fair for the tribals. It was announced as a state fair in 2018. Charcharia waterfall nearby Lalpania ghati is also one of the attractive sightseeing in Gumia.
