= Coalfield Express =

Train in India

Overview
- Service type: Superfast
- Locale: West Bengal & Jharkhand
- First service: 1 March 1955; 71 years ago
- Current operator: Eastern Railway

Route
- Termini: Howrah (HWH); Dhanbad (DHN)
- Stops: 11
- Distance travelled: 259 km (161 mi)
- Average journey time: 4 hrs 35 mins
- Service frequency: Daily
- Train number: 12339 / 12340

On-board services
- Classes: AC Chair Car, Second Class Seating, General Unreserved
- Seating arrangements: Yes
- Sleeping arrangements: No
- Auto-rack arrangements: Overhead racks
- Catering facilities: On-board catering, E-catering
- Observation facilities: Large windows
- Baggage facilities: Available
- Other facilities: Below the seats

Technical
- Rolling stock: LHB coach
- Track gauge: 1,676 mm (5 ft 6 in)
- Operating speed: 56 km/h (35 mph) aerage including halts.

The 12339 / 12340 Coalfield Express is a daily superfast train that connects the major coal and industrial city of Dhanbad, Jharkhand with the adjoining coal and industrial cities of Asansol, RaniGanj, Andal, Waria, and Durgapur with the capital city of West Bengal, Kolkata. This train is also known as the twin / sister train of the Howrah – Dhanbad Black Diamond Express. Initially running as 3029/3030, the train was converted to superfast on 3 June 2006, since when it has been running as 12339/12340.

== Schedule ==
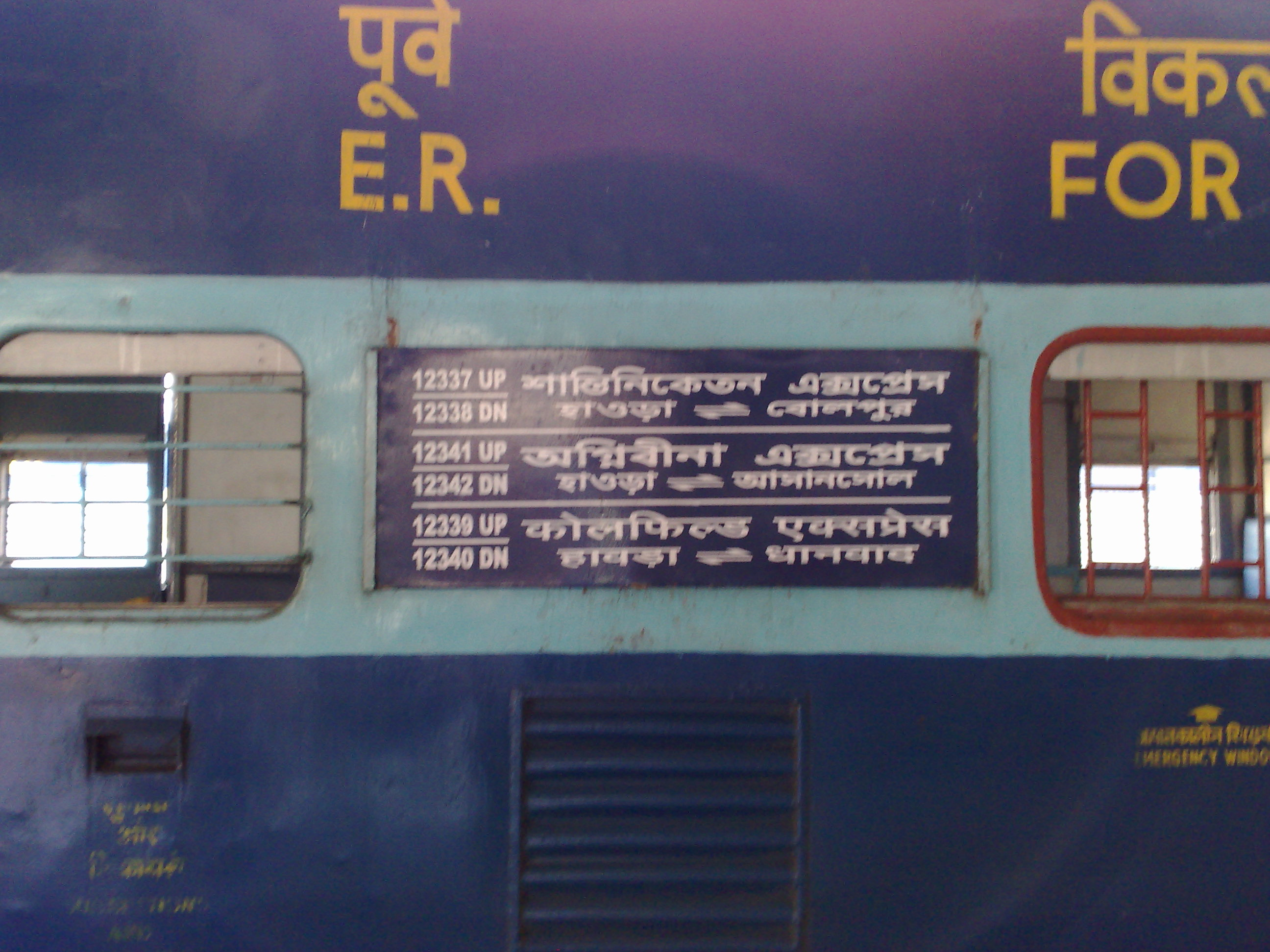
Train board of Coalfield Express, indicating the rake sharing with Agnibina Express and Shantiniketan Express

12339 (HWH – DHN) departs from Howrah at 17:20 and arrives at Dhanbad at 21:55, while 12340 (DHN – HWH) departs from Dhanbad at 05:50 and arrives at Howrah at 10:25, thereby covering a distance of 259 km in 4 hours and 35 minutes, with an average speed of 56 km/h (35 mph) and maximum permissible speed of 130 km/h (81 mph) throughout the journey.

HWH – DHN – HWH Coalfield Express
12339		Stations	12340	
Arrival	Departure	Stations	Arrival	Departure
—	17:20	Howrah Junction	10:25	—
18:57	18:58	Mankar	08:04	08:05
19:05	19:06	Panagarh	07:53	07:54
19:20	19:22	Durgapur	07:39	07:41
19:30	19:31	Waria	07:29	07:30
19:37	19:39	Andal Junction	07:18	07:20
19:47	19:49	Raniganj	07:09	07:10
20:04	20:07	Asansol Junction	06:50	06:53
20:18	20:19	Sitarampur Junction	06:39	06:40
20:25	20:26	Kulti	06:33	06:34
20:31	20:32	Barakar	06:28	06:29
20:36	20:37	Kumardubi	06:23	06:24
21:55	—	Dhanbad Junction	—	05:50

== Coach composition and rake sharing ==
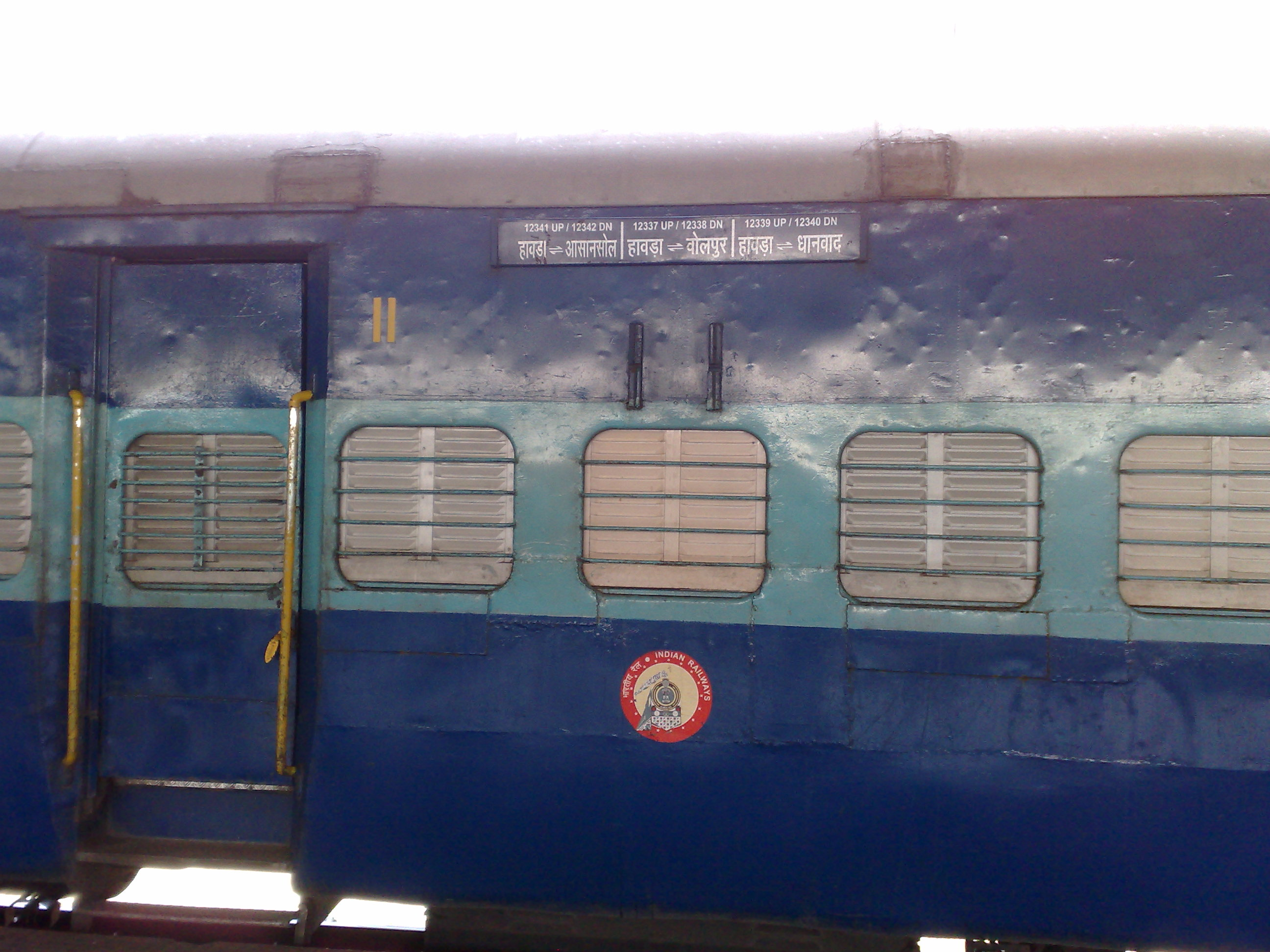
A Second Class Sitting coach (2S) of Coalfield Express

The train consists of modern LHB coaches: two AC Chair Car coaches (C1 and C2), five Non-AC Chair Car coaches (D1 to D5), eight Unreserved General coaches (UR), one Ladies Unreserved General coach (LDS-UR) one Sitting cum Luggage Rake coach (SLR) and one End on Generation (EOG) / Power car.

The train shares its rake with Shantiniketan Express and Agnibina Express.

== Traction ==
It is regularly hauled by a Howrah Loco Shed-based WAP-5 / WAP-7 electric locomotive on its entire journey.
