= Randiha =

- Village
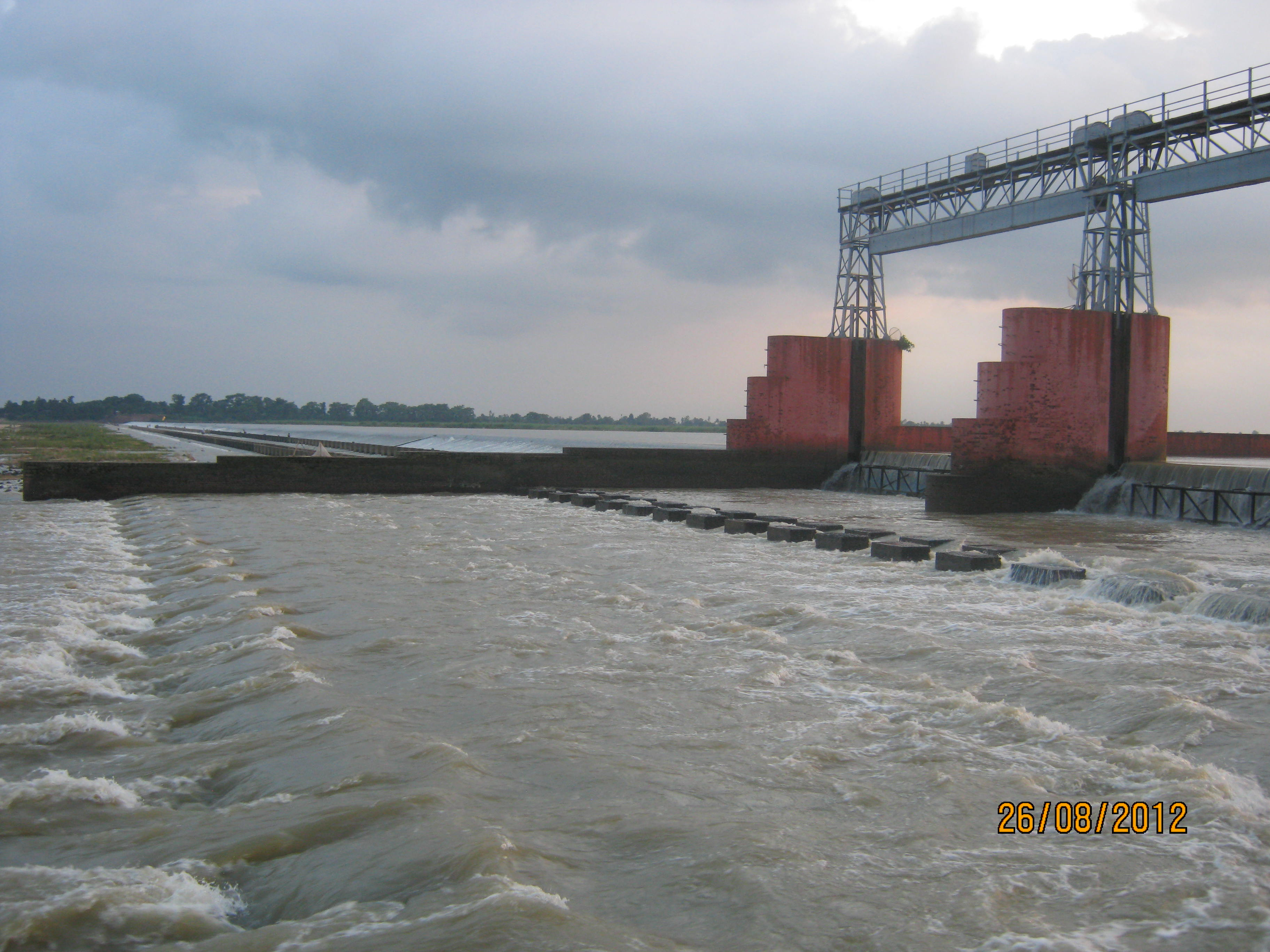
- Randiha weir

- Location in West Bengal, India Randiha (India)
- Coordinates: 23.369°N 87.471°E
- Country: India
- State: West Bengal
- District: Purba Bardhaman
- Elevation: 23 m (75 ft)

Population (2011)
  - Total: 1,953

Languages
  - Official: Bengali, English
- Time zone: UTC+5:30 (IST)
- PIN: 713149
- Vehicle registration: WB
- Website: purbabardhaman.gov.in

Randiha (also spelled Rondia) is a village in Galsi I CD block in Bardhaman Sadar North subdivision of Purba Bardhaman district in the Indian state of West Bengal.

== Demographics ==
As per the 2011 Census of India Randiha had a total population of 1,953, of which 1,014 (52%) were males and 938 (47%) were females. Population below 6 years was 191. The total number of literates in Randiha was 1,274 (72.30% of the population over 6 years).

== Geography ==
Cities and towns in the Bardhaman Sadar North subdivision of Purba Bardhaman district
M: municipal city/ town, CT: census town, R: rural/ urban centre, H: historical site, W: river project, C: craft centre
Owing to space constraints in the small map, the actual locations in a larger map may vary slightly

=== Weir ===
In 1932, the Anderson weir was constructed at Randiha. As a result, irrigation facility has been available in the lower Damodar basin before the advent of dams by means of the diversion weir on the Damodar and Eden canal to the extent of 890 square kilometres in the districts of Burdwan and Hooghly. Detailed examination of flow data as available at Randiha, revealed that maximum flow of 650,000 cu ft/s (18,000 m^{3}/s) had occurred twice in August 1913 and August 1935 before the implementation of Damodar Valley Scheme.

It is about 10 kilometres (6.2 mi) from Panagarh on NH 19 and about 19 kilometres (12 mi) downstream of Durgapur Barrage.

== Picnic spot ==
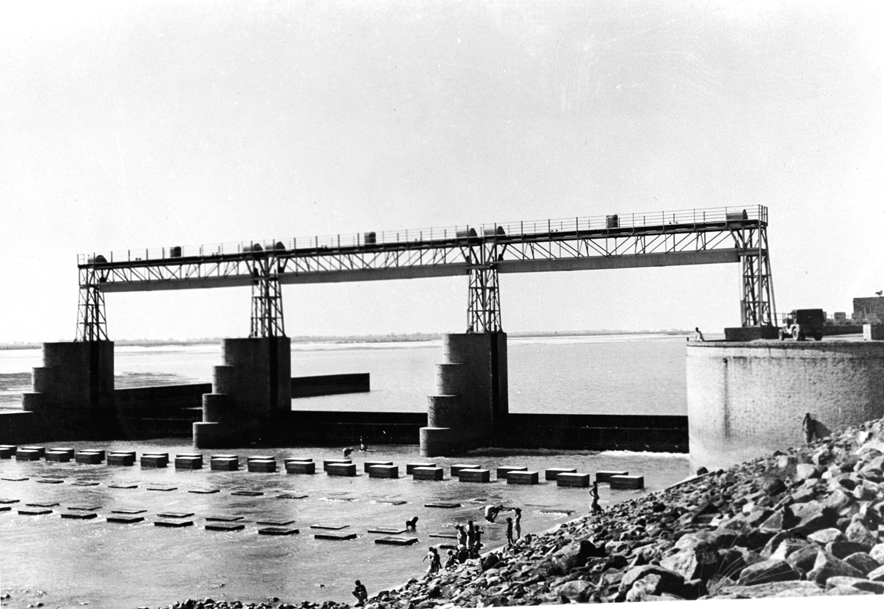
Anderson Weir at Randiha

It is a picnic spot.

== Eden Canal ==
The Eden Canal was built in 1904 (or earlier) from Kanchannagar to Jamalpur and was linked to the Damodar canals carrying water from Randiha weir in the thirties. It provides irrigation to 10,000 hectares of land in Barddhaman district.
