= Bokaro River =

Location
- Country: India
- State: Jharkhand
- City: Bokaro (Thermal)

Physical characteristics
- Mouth: Konar River
  - location: Bokaro district
  - coordinates: 23°46′52″N 85°52′37″E

The Bokaro River flows through the Hazaribagh and Bokaro districts in the Indian state of Jharkhand.

== Course ==
The Bokaro River rises on the Hazaribagh plateau, south of Hazaribagh, and quickly skirts the southern face to pass in a narrow and valley between Jilinga and Langu Hills. It passes through the West Bokaro and East Bokaro coalfields. The Bokaro flows into the Konar River shortly before the latter flows into the Damodar River.

== Barrage ==
A barrage has been constructed at the point of its confluence with the Konar River to supply water to Bokaro Thermal Power Station.
