= Shantiniketan Express =

Train in India

Overview
- Service type: Superfast
- First service: 1 August 1985; 40 years ago
- Current operator: Eastern Railway

Route
- Termini: Howrah Junction (HWH); Bolpur Shantiniketan (BHP)
- Stops: 2
- Distance travelled: 146 km (91 mi)
- Average journey time: 2 hours 10 minutes
- Service frequency: Daily. (Note: Runs two days in a week for every direction.)
- Train number: 12337 / 12338

On-board services
- Classes: Chair Car, General Unreserved
- Seating arrangements: Yes
- Sleeping arrangements: No
- Auto-rack arrangements: Overhead racks
- Catering facilities: On-board catering, E-catering
- Observation facilities: Large windows
- Baggage facilities: Available
- Other facilities: Below the seats

Technical
- Rolling stock: LHB coach
- Track gauge: 1,676 mm (5 ft 6 in)
- Operating speed: 68 km/h (42 mph) average including halts.

The 12337 / 12338 Shantiniketan Express is an superfast express train of the Indian Railways connecting Howrah Junction in West Bengal and Bolpur Shantiniketan of West Bengal. It is currently being operated with 12337/12338 train numbers on a daily basis.

== Service ==
The 12337/ Shantiniketan Express has an average speed of 66.92 km/h and covers 145 km in 2 hrs 10 mins. 12338/Shantiniketan Express has an average speed of 58 km/h and 145 km in 2 hrs 30 mins.

== Route and halts ==
The train starts at Howrah and terminates at Shantiniketan. The important halts of the train are:

- Howrah Junction
- Barddhaman Junction
- Guskara
- Bolpur Shantiniketan

== Schedule ==
The schedule of this 12337/12338 Howrah–Bolpur Shantiniketan Express is given below:-

HWH - BHP - HWH Shantiniketan Express
12337		Stations	12338	
Arrival	Departure	Stations	Arrival	Departure
-NIL-	10:00	Howrah Junction	16:00	-NIL-
11:02	11:04	Barddhaman Junction	14:04	14:06
11:40	11:41	Guskara	13:21	13:23
12:15	-NIL-	Bolpur Shantiniketan	-NIL-	13:15

== Coach composition ==
The train has LHB rake. The train consists of 18 coaches:

- 2 A.C. Chair Car
- 5 Reserved Chair Car
- 8 General coaches
- 1 Ladies coach
- 1 SLR
- 1 Generator car

== Traction ==
Both trains are hauled by a Howrah Loco Shed-based WAP-5 / WAP-7 electric locomotive from Howrah to Bolpur and vice versa.

== Rake sharing ==
It shares its rake with

- 12339/12340 Coalfield Express
- 12341/12342 Agnibina Express.

== See also ==
- Howrah Junction railway station
- Bolpur Shantiniketan railway station
- Agnibina Express
- Coalfield Express
