= Waria, India =

Waria
- neighbourhood
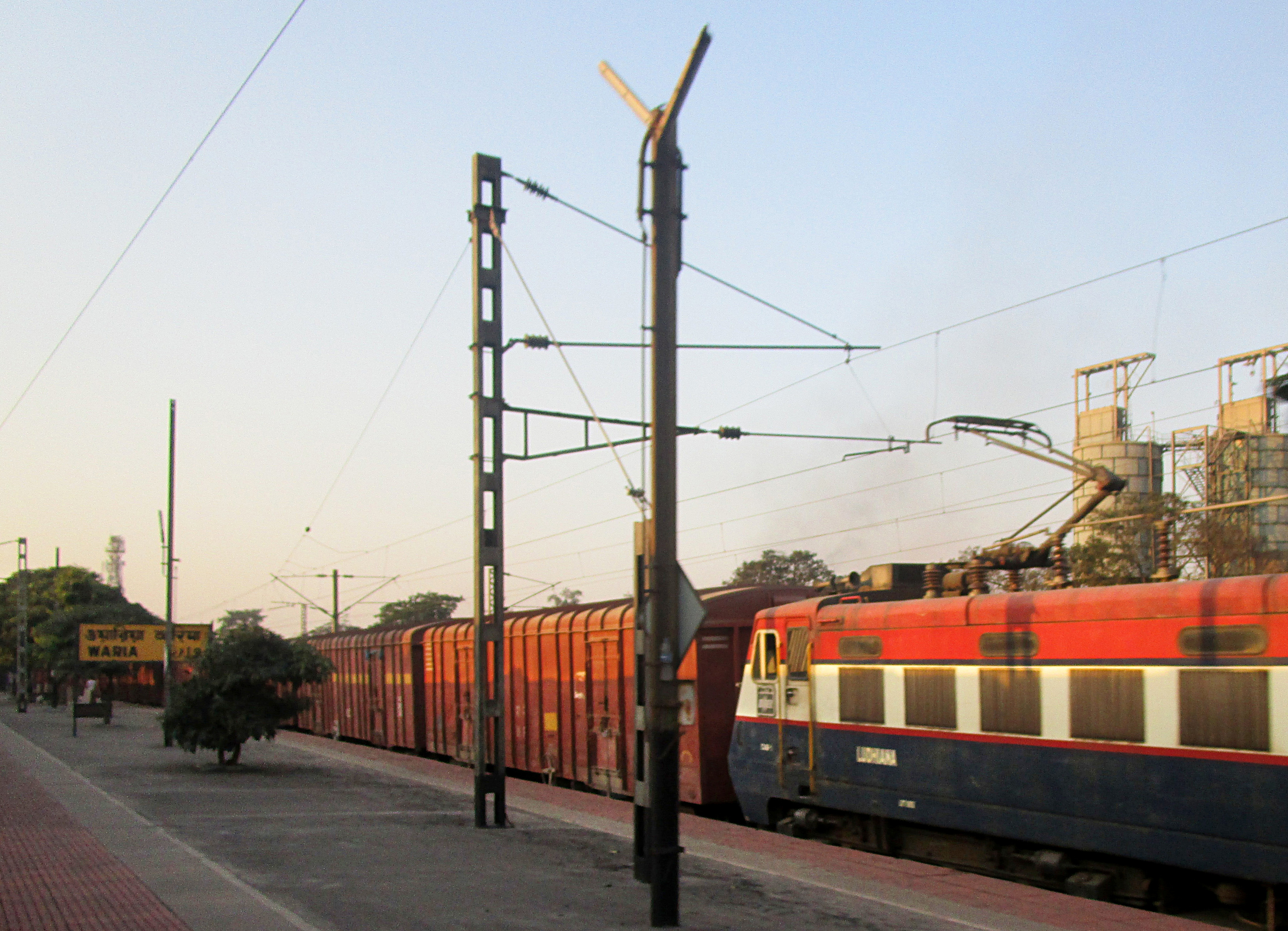
- Waria railway station platform

- Location in West Bengal, India Waria (India)
- Coordinates: 23.538809°N 87.246526°E
- Country: India
- State: West Bengal

Government
  - Body: Durgapur Municipal Corporation

Languages
  - Official: Bengali, English
- Time zone: UTC+5:30 (IST)
- PIN: 713203, 713207
- Telephone code: 0343
- Vehicle registration: WB-39, WB-40
- Lok Sabha constituency: Barddhaman-Durgapur
- Vidhan Sabha constituency: Durgapur Paschim
- Civic agency: Durgapur Municipal Corporation
- Climate: hot and breezy (Köppen)
- Website: wb.gov.in

Waria is a locality in Durgapur, in the district of Paschim Bardhaman of West Bengal, India. It is located between the neighbourhoods of Mayabazar and Andal. The river Damodar flows to its south. The Durgapur Steel Plant and the Durgapur Thermal Power Station of the Damodar Valley Corporation are close to the Waria railway station.
