= Kasba Thermal Power Station =

Kasba Thermal Power Station is a gas-based thermal power plant located at Kasba in Kolkata in the Indian state of West Bengal. The power plant is operated by CESC Limited.

== Capacity ==
It has an installed capacity of 40 MW (2x20 MW gas turbines).
