= Konar River =

Location
- Country: India
- State: Jharkhand
- Cities: Hazaribagh, Gomia

Physical characteristics
- Source
  - location: Sultana village, Hazaribagh district, Chota Nagpur Plateau, Jharkhand
- Mouth: Damodar River
  - location: Jaridih Bazar, Bokaro district
  - coordinates: 23°45′40″N 85°55′01″E

Basin features
- Tributaries
  - left: Siwani River
  - right: Bokaro River

The Konar River is a tributary of Damodar River in Hazaribagh and Bokaro districts of the Indian state of Jharkhand.

== Course ==
The Konar originates near Sultana village on the Hazaribagh-Chatra Road. Thereafter, the Konar with its tributary the Siwani drains a greater portion of the Hazaribagh plateau, and then descending through the barren wastes of scrub and jungle passes Gomia to receive the waters of the Bokaro River, shortly before it joins the Damodar River near Jaridih Bazar in Bokaro district.

== Konar Dam ==
Konar Dam is the second of the four multi-purpose dams included in the first phase of the Damodar Valley Corporation. It was constructed across the Konar River and inaugurated in 1955.

Konar Dam is 4,535 metres (14,879 ft) long and 48.77 metres (160.0 ft) high. The reservoir covers an area of 27.92 square kilometres (10.78 mi^{2}). The Konar earth and concrete dam has a catchment area of 997 square kilometres (385 mi^{2}).

== Bokaro barrage ==
There is a barrage across the Konar River at the point of its confluence with the Bokaro River to serve Bokaro Thermal Power Station B.
