= Agnibina Express =

Train in India

Overview
- Service type: Superfast Express
- Locale: West Bengal
- First service: 15 August 1976; 50 years ago
- Current operator: Eastern Railway

Route
- Termini: Howrah (HWH); Asansol (ASN)
- Stops: 6
- Distance travelled: 200 km (124 mi)
- Average journey time: 3 hours 10 minutes
- Service frequency: Daily (Note: Runs seven days in a week for every direction.)
- Train number: 12341 / 12342

On-board services
- Classes: AC Chair Car, Second Seating, General Unreserved
- Seating arrangements: Yes
- Sleeping arrangements: No
- Catering facilities: E-catering only
- Observation facilities: Large windows
- Baggage facilities: Available
- Other facilities: Below the seats

Technical
- Rolling stock: LHB coach
- Track gauge: 1,676 mm (5 ft 6 in)
- Operating speed: 63 km/h (39 mph) avg 130 km/h (81 mph) max

The 12341 / 12342 Agnibina Express is a daily superfast train that runs in the state of West Bengal, between Howrah Junction and Asansol Junction. The train belongs to Eastern Railway, maintained at Howrah. It connects the major coal and steel industrial cities of Asansol, Raniganj, Andal and Durgapur to the capital city of Kolkata, and is therefore, a very important train on the route for daily passengers.

Initially known as the Asansol Express, the train was renamed the Agnibina Express as a tribute to Kazi Nazrul Islam, whose birthplace is near Asansol and whose first poetry book was titled Agnibina. However, unofficially, the train is often referred to as the Bidhan Express.

== Route and halts ==
- Howrah Junction
- Barddhaman Junction
- Mankar
- Panagarh
- Durgapur
- Andal Junction
- Raniganj
- Asansol Junction

== Schedule ==
Agnibina Express runs 7 days a week in both directions. 12342 departs Asansol Jn at 05:30 and reaches Howrah Jn at 08:50, while 12341 departs Howrah Jn at 18:20 and reaches Asansol Jn at 21:30, covering 200 km in 3 hours and 10–20 minutes. The average speed remains around 60–63 km/h (37–39 mph), and the maximum permissible speed is 130 km/h (81 mph) throughout its journey.

=== 12342 ===
| Sl No. | Station code | Station name | Time (IST) | Distance (KM) | Day |
|---|---|---|---|---|---|
| 1 | ASN | Asansol Junction | 05:30 | 0 (Source) | 1 |
| 2 | RNG | Raniganj | 05:41 | 19 | 1 |
| 3 | UDL | Andal Junction | 05:48 | 26 | 1 |
| 4 | DGR | Durgapur | 06:01 | 43 | 1 |
| 5 | PAN | Panagarh | 06:15 | 58 | 1 |
| 6 | MNAE | Mankar | 06:25 | 68 | 1 |
| 7 | BWN | Barddhaman Junction | 07:05 | 106 | 1 |
| 8 | HWH | Howrah | 09:00 | 200 (Destination) | 1 |

=== 12341 ===
| Sl No. | Station code | Station name | Time (IST) | Distance (KM) | Day |
|---|---|---|---|---|---|
| 1 | HWH | Howrah Junction | 18:20 | 0 (Source) | 1 |
| 2 | BWN | Barddhaman Junction | 19:17 | 95 | 1 |
| 3 | MNAE | Mankar | 19:52 | 132 | 1 |
| 4 | PAN | Panagarh | 20:02 | 143 | 1 |
| 5 | DGR | Durgapur | 20:15 | 159 | 1 |
| 6 | UDL | Andal Junction | 20:29 | 175 | 1 |
| 7 | RNG | Raniganj | 20:42 | 182 | 1 |
| 8 | ASN | Asansol Junction | 21:30 | 200 (Destination) | 1 |

== Coach composition and rake sharing ==
The train consists of 18 coaches which includes 2 air-conditioned chair cars, 5 second seating chair cars, 10 general cars (including 1 SLR and 1 LDS) and 1 EOG cum luggage brake van. The train has run with LHB rakes since 2018.

It shares its rakes with the Shantiniketan Express and the Coalfield Express.

== Traction ==
It is hauled by a Howrah-based WAP-7 or WAP-5 locomotive throughout its entire journey.

== Notes ==
The train started as Chittaranjan–Howrah Bidhan Express, but was later temporarily terminated at Asansol for operational reasons during the 1970s.

== See also ==
- Howrah Junction railway station
- Asansol Junction railway station
- Shantiniketan Express
- Coalfield Express
- Black Diamond Express
