= CESC Tunnel =

Tunnel of India and Asia

The CESC Tunnel is situated under the Hooghly River in Kolkata, West Bengal, India. This is the first underwater tunnel in Asia, completed in 1931. It is used for electric power transmission from Kolkata to Howrah.

== History ==
This tunnel was not made by modern tunnel boring machine. It was made by simple tools like spade, shovel etc. Indian Punjabi labours were employed and they attached the cast iron rings creating the tunnel wall.

Sir Harley Dalrymple-Hay was appointed head of design and construction for the project in 1928 by the Calcutta Electric Supply Corporation, it was the first underwater tunnel in Calcutta. He and the boiler specialist John Lochrance had designed Asia's first underwater tunnel in 1928.

The construction began in March 1930. First, a well was dug on the Hooghly River side of the Indian Botanic Garden in Howrah. After one month, labourers began digging another similar well on the opposite side of Hooghly River at Metiabruz in Kolkata. The well digging process took 4 months to complete. Then the main 0.539 km (0.335 mi) tunnel digging process was begun from the Metiabruz side, under 33.5 metres (110 ft) the river's bottom.

Asia's first underwater tunnel was finally completed in July 1931. The total construction of this tunnel took 17 months. Two Indian labours and Normal Smith a British worker died during the construction.

== Importance ==
The CESC tunnel was specially studied by the engineers of Kolkata Metro, for the construction of East West Metro Tunnel. This tunnel is an important part of the electric supply system of the CESC Limited company.
