= Koderma Thermal Power Station =

Power plant in Banjhedih, India

Koderma
- Location of the Koderma Thermal Power Station in Jharkhand
- Country: India
- Location: Banjhedih, Jainagar CD block, Jharkhand
- Coordinates: 24.391133°N 85.561101°E
- Status: Operational
- Commission date: Unit 1: July 2013; Unit 2: June 2015
- Operator: Damodar Valley Corporation

Thermal power station
- Primary fuel: Bituminous coal

Power generation
- Units operational: 2 X 500 MW
- Nameplate capacity: 1000 MW

Koderma Thermal Power Station is a coal-based thermal power plant located in Banjhedih, Jainagar CD block, Koderma district in the Indian state of Jharkhand. The power plant is operated by the Damodar Valley Corporation.

== Capacity ==
It has an installed capacity of 1000 Mega Watts.

Unit No.	Generating Capacity	Commissioned on	Status
1	500 MW	2013 July	Running
2	500 MW	2014 June	Running
