= Konar Dam =

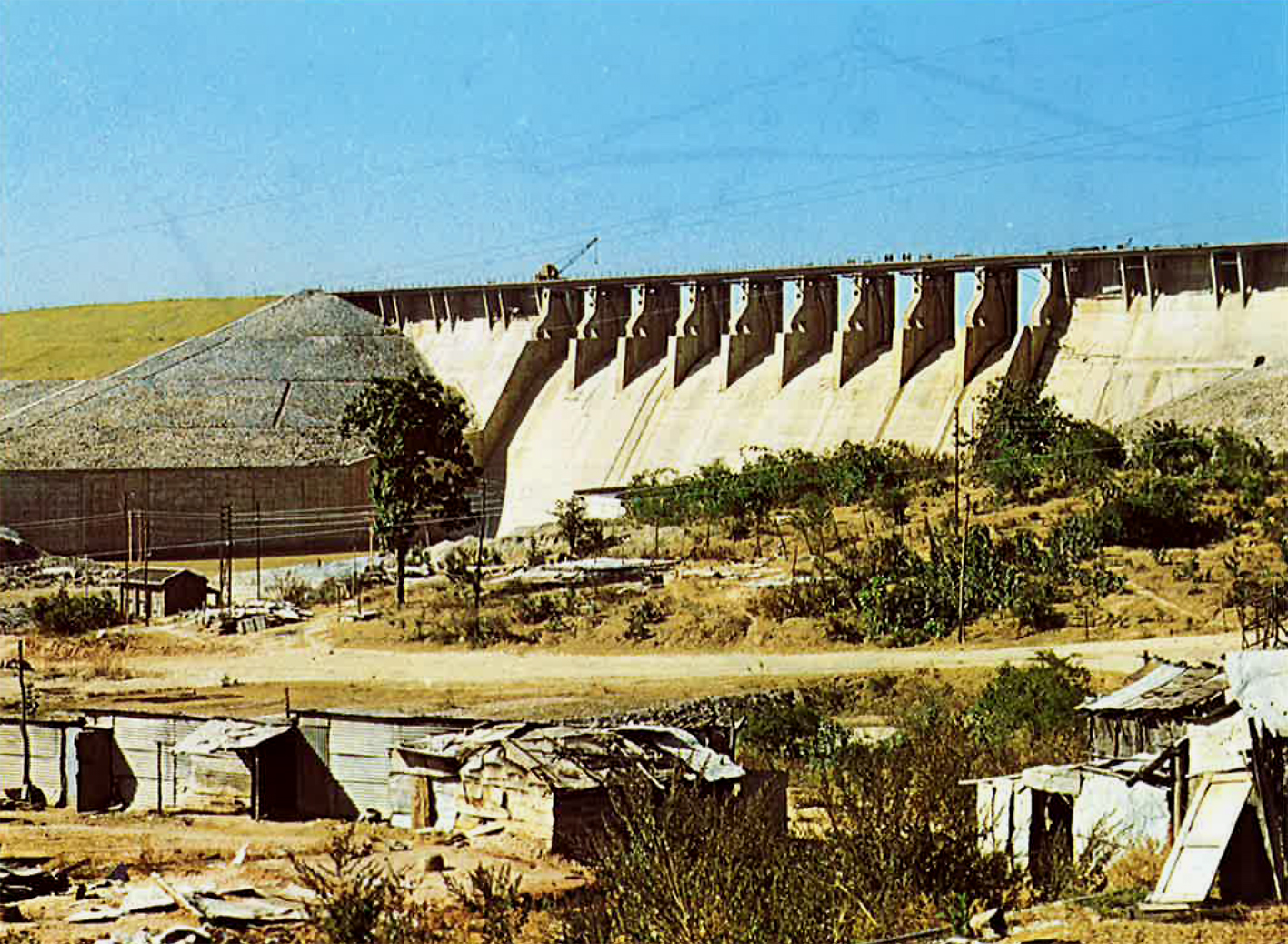
- Konar Dam

- Location of Konar Dam (marked in red) in Jharkhand
- Location: Hazaribagh District, Jharkhand, India
- Coordinates: 23°56′28″N 85°46′30″E
- Opening date: 15 October 1955

Dam and spillways
- Impounds: Konar River
- Height: 48.77 metres (160.0 ft)
- Length: 4,535 metres (14,879 ft)

Reservoir
- Surface area: 27.92 sq Km

Power Station
- Operator: Damodar Valley Corporation

Konar Dam is the second of the four multi-purpose dams included in the first phase of the Damodar Valley Corporation. It was constructed across the Konar River, a tributary of the Damodar River in Hazaribagh district in the Indian state of Jharkhand and opened in 1955. The place has been developed as a recreational spot.

== Geography ==
Cities, towns and locations in Hazaribagh district in North Chotanagpur Division
Some census towns and locations around Hazaribagh city have been shown in the Hazaribagh City map
M: municipality, CT: census town, R: rural/ urban centre, T: tourist centre, D: dam, HS: hot spring
Owing to space constraints in the small map, the actual locations in a larger map may vary slightly

=== Location ===
Konar Dam is located at 23°56′28″N 85°46′30″E.

Konar Dam is 4,535 metres (14,879 ft) long and 48.77 metres (160.0 ft) high. When full, the reservoir covers an area of 27.92 km^{2}. The dam maintained and operated by DVC has an effective storage of 176 MCM (million cubic meters) or 6.2 Tmcft

Note: The map alongside presents some of the notable locations in the district. All places marked in the map are linked in the larger full screen map.

== DVC overview ==
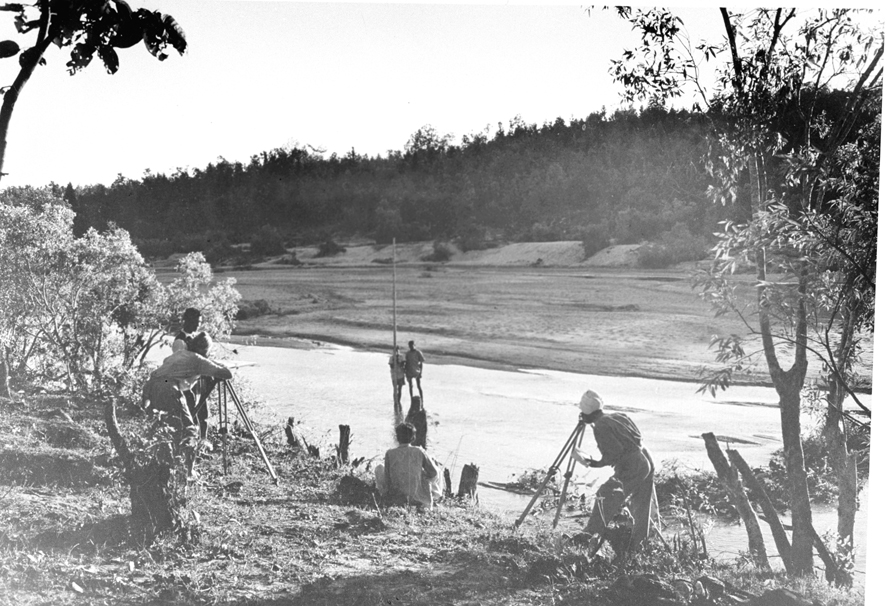
Survey work at Konar Dam site in 1949

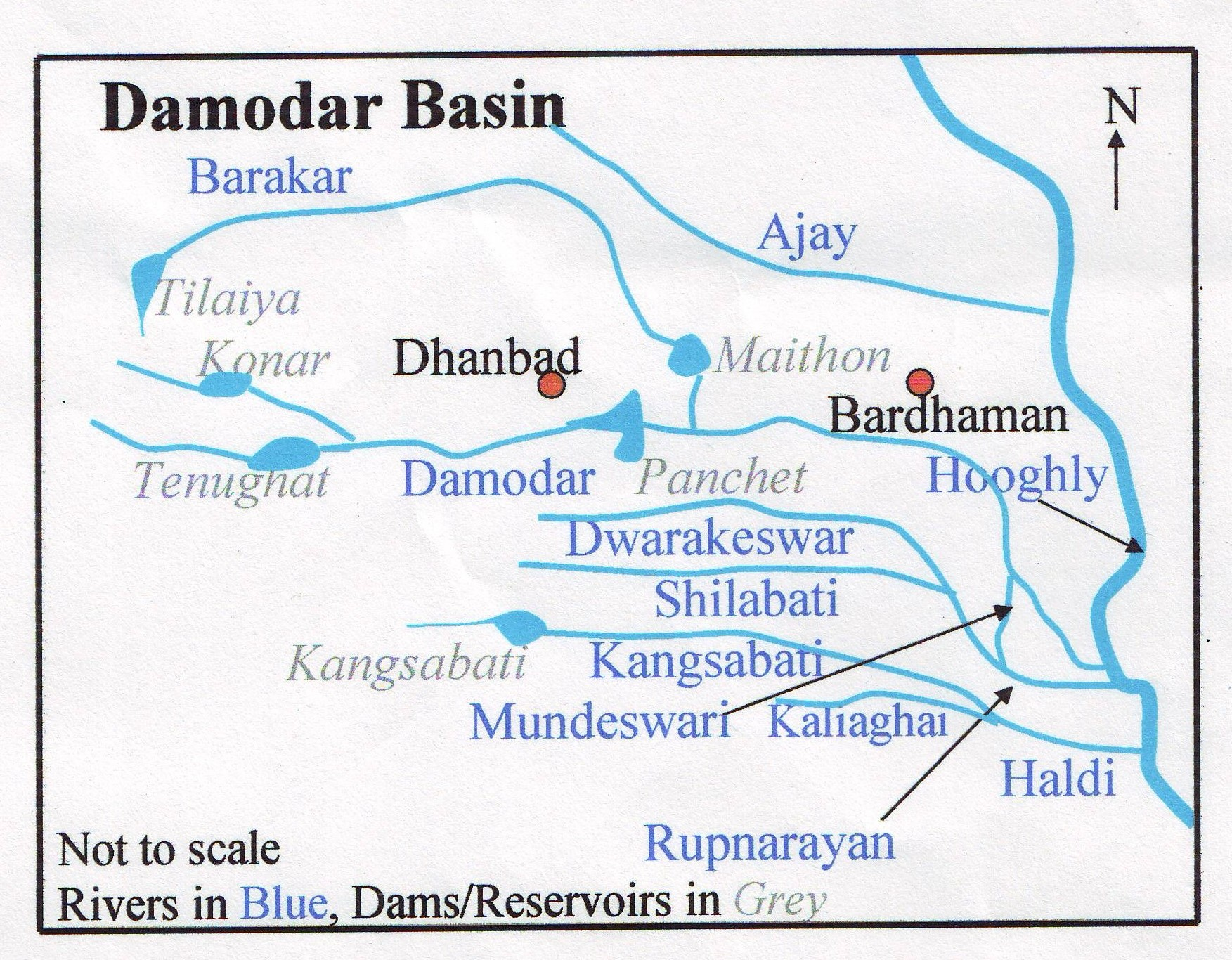
Damodar Basin

As a result of the catastrophic flood of 1943, the Governor of Bengal appointed the Damodar Flood enquiry committee to suggest remedial measures.Damodar Valley Corporation came into existence in 1948 for development and management of the basin as a whole. Voorduin envisaged the construction of eight dams and a barrage, but it was later decided to have only four dams, at Tilaiya, Konar, Maithon and Panchet, and Durgapur Barrage.

The first dam was built across the Barakar River at Tilaiya and inaugurated in 1953. The second dam across the Konar River was inaugurated in 1955. The third dam across the Barakar at Maithon was inaugurated in 1957. The fourth dam across the Damodar at Panchet was inaugurated in 1959.

== Transport ==
Konar Dam is located 41 kilometres (25 mi) south-east of Hazaribagh.
