= Dhariwal Power Station =

Thermal power plant

- Country: India
- Location: Near Tadali, Chandrapur district, Maharashtra, India
- Coordinates: 20°00′39″N 79°12′13″E
- Status: Operational
- Owner: Dhariwal Infrastructure Limited (a subsidiary of CESC Limited)

Power generation
- Nameplate capacity: 600 MW

Dhariwal Power Station or CESC Chandrapur Thermal Power Station is a coal-based thermal power plant located at near Tadali town in Chandrapur district in the Indian state of Maharashtra. The power plant is operated by Dhariwal Infrastructure Limited a subsidiary of CESC Limited.

== Capacity ==
It has an installed capacity of 600 MW (2x300 MW).

Unit No.	Capacity	Commissioned on	Status
1	300 MW	2014 February	Running
2	300 MW	2014 August	Running
