= Durgapur Steel Thermal Power Station =

Power station in West Bengal, India

- Country: India
- Location: Durgapur, Paschim Bardhaman, West Bengal
- Coordinates: 23°35′08″N 87°12′31″E
- Status: Operational
- Commission date: 2012
- Owner: DVC
- Operator: Damodar Valley Corporation

Thermal power station
- Primary fuel: Coal

Power generation
- Units operational: 2×500 MW(Unit 1-2)
- Nameplate capacity: 1000 MW

External links
- Website: www.dvc.gov.in

Durgapur Steel Thermal Power Station is a coal-based thermal power plant located in Durgapur city in Paschim Bardhaman district in the Indian state of West Bengal. The power plant is operated by the Damodar Valley Corporation.

== Capacity ==
It has an installed capacity of 1,000 megawatts.

Unit No.	Generating Capacity	Commissioned on	Status
1	500 MW	2012 May	Running
2	500 MW	2013 March	Running
