= Southern Thermal Power Station =

Coal based thermal power plant in Kolkata, India

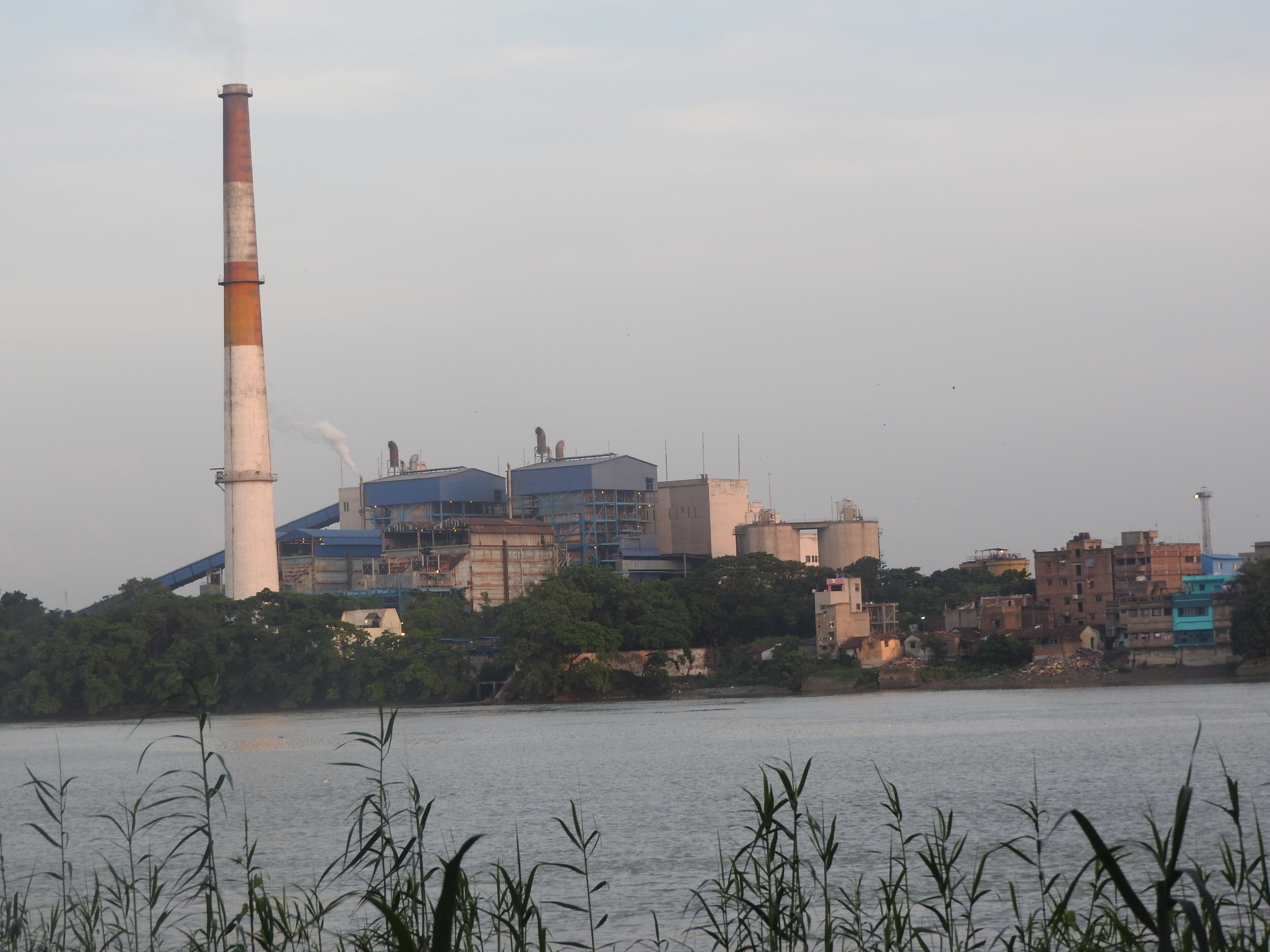
CESC Southern Thermal Power Station

Southern Thermal Power Station is a coal-based thermal power plant located in Garden Reach, Kolkata in the Indian state of West Bengal. The power plant is operated by the CESC Limited.

== Capacity ==
It has an installed capacity of 135 MW (2x67.5 MW). It became fully operational in 1990.
