= Chandrapura Thermal Power Station =

Power plant in Jharkhand, India

Chandrapura
- Location of the Chandrapura Thermal Power Station in Jharkhand
- Country: India
- Location: Chandrapura, Jharkhand
- Coordinates: 23°44′23.8″N 86°06′46.3″E
- Status: Operational
- Commission date: Unit 1: October 1964; Unit 2: May 1965; Unit 3: July 1968; Unit 4: November 2011; Unit 5: July 2011; Unit 7&8
- Decommission date: Unit 1: 13 January 2017 Unit 2 : 30 July 2017 Unit 3,4,5,6
- Operator: Damodar Valley Corporation

Thermal power station
- Primary fuel: Bituminous coal

Power generation
- Units operational: 2 X 250 MW U#7&8
- Nameplate capacity: 500 MW

External links
- Website: www.dvc.gov.in/Chandrapura.htm

Chandrapura Thermal Power Station is a thermal power plant located in Chandrapura Town in the Indian state of Jharkhand. The power plant is operated by the Damodar Valley Corporation Central Government Owned with jharkhand Government And West Bengal Government. It has two units with a total installed capacity of 500 MW(2×250 MW); both burn pulverised coal.

== Capacity ==
Chandrapura Thermal Power Station has an installed capacity of 500 MW. The plant has 2 units under operation. The individual units has the generating capacity as follows:

Unit No.	Generating Capacity	Commissioned on
U#1	130 MW	October 1964; retired on 13 Jan 2017
U#2	130 MW	May 1965; retired on 30 Jul 2017
U#3	130 MW	July 1968 retired
U#7	250 MW	November 2011
U#8	250 MW	July 2011
