= CESC Limited =

Electricity supply company in Kolkata, India

Calcutta Electric Supply Corporation Limited
- Type: Public limited company
- Traded as: NSE: CESC; BSE: 500084
- Industry: Electric utility
- Founded: Kolkata, India
- Founders: R. P. Goenka
- Headquarters: Kolkata, India
- Area served: West Bengal, Maharashtra, Rajasthan (India)
- Key people: Sanjiv Goenka (Chairman); Brajesh Singh (MD – Generation); Vineet Sikka (MD – Distribution); Rajarshi Banerjee (CFO)
- Products: Electrical power
- Services: Electricity generation and distribution natural gas exploration, production, transportation and distribution
- Revenue: ▲₹15,544 crore (US$1.7 billion) (2024)
- Net income: ▲₹1,448 crore (US$150 million) (2024)
- Total assets: ▲₹37,168 crore (US$4.0 billion)
- Total equity: ▲₹11,985 crore (US$1.3 billion)
- Number of employees: 6087 (2024)
- Parent: RPSG Group
- Website: cesc.co.in

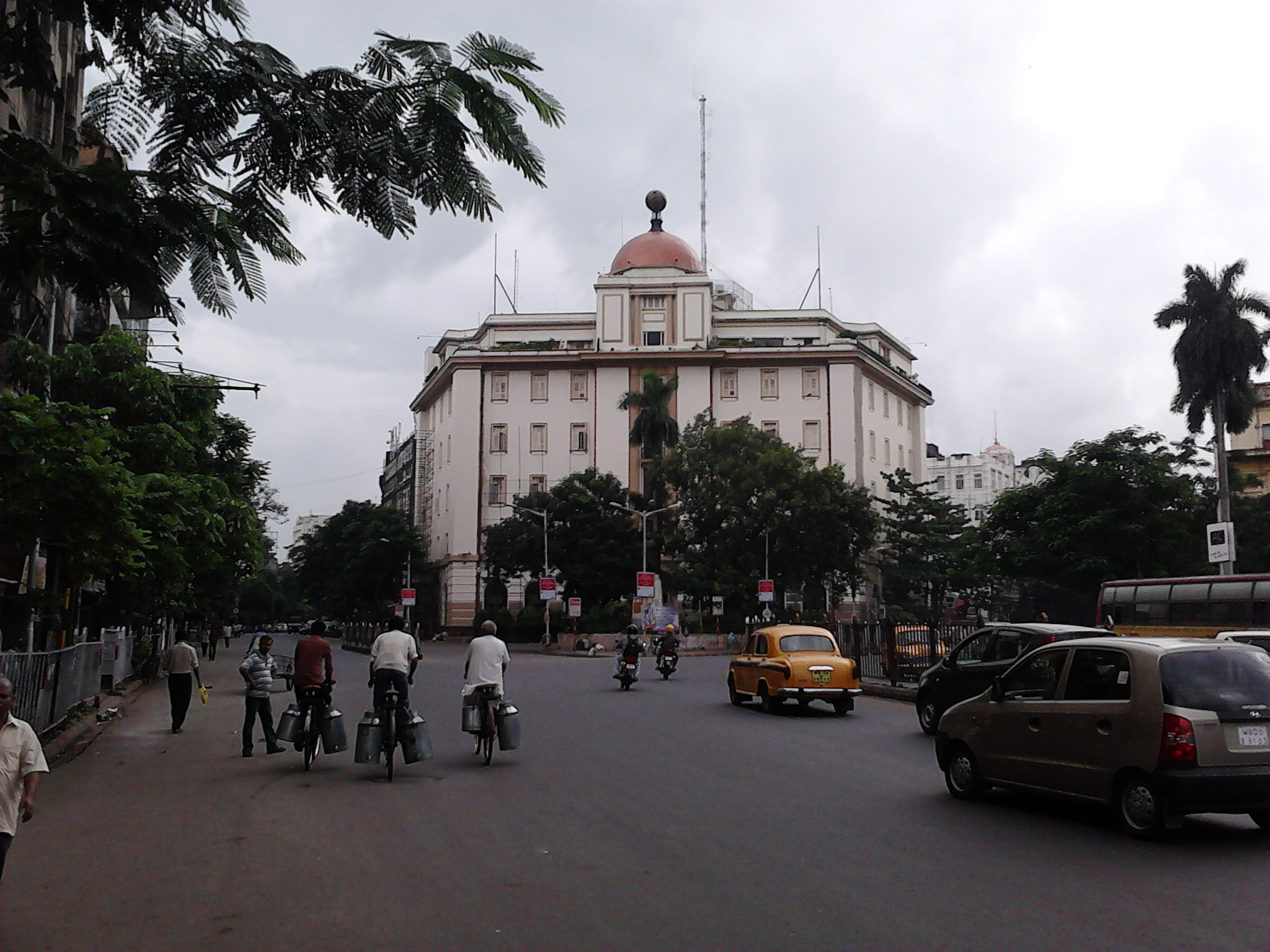
Victoria House at Esplanade, Kolkata, the headquarters of CESC.

The Calcutta Electric Supply Corporation (CESC) is the Kolkata-based flagship company of the RP-Sanjiv Goenka Group, born from the erstwhile RPG Group, under the chairmanship of businessman Sanjiv Goenka. It is an Indian electricity generation and the sole distribution company serving 567 square kilometres (219 sq mi) of area administered by the Kolkata municipal corporation, in the city of Kolkata, as well as parts of Howrah, Hooghly, 24 Parganas (North) and 24 Parganas (South) districts in the state of West Bengal. It also serves power distribution in Kota, Bikaner and Bharatpur in Rajasthan under the name CESC RAJASTHAN. It serves 3.0 million consumers approximately, which includes domestic, industrial and commercial users.

== History ==
The first demonstration of electric light in Calcutta was conducted on 24 July 1879 by P W Fleury & Co. In 1881, 36 electric lights lit up a Cotton Mill of Mackinnon & Mackenzie. The Government of Bengal passed the Calcutta Electric Lighting Act in 1895. The first license covered an area of 5.64 square miles (14.6 km^{2}). On 7 January 1897 Kilburn & Co. secured the Calcutta electric lighting license as agents of The Indian Electric Company Limited. The company soon changed its name to the Calcutta Electric Supply Corporation Limited and in 1897, The Calcutta Electric Supply Corporation Limited was registered in London.

On 17 April 1899, the first thermal power plant of The Calcutta Electric Supply Corporation Limited was commissioned at Emambagh Lane near Prinsep Street, heralding the beginning of thermal power generation in India. The Calcutta Tramways Company switched to electricity from horse-drawn carriages in 1902. Three new power generating stations were started by 1906. In 1931, CESC Tunnel was made under Hooghly River for electric power transmission from Kolkata to Howrah. The company was shifted to the Victoria House in Dharmatala, Kolkata in 1933, and still operates from this address.

In 1970, the control of the Company was transferred from London to Calcutta. In 1978 it was named "The Calcutta Electric Supply Corporation (India) Ltd." The RPG Group was associated with The Calcutta Electric Supply Corporation (India) Limited from 1989, and the name was changed from The Calcutta Electric Supply Corporation (India) Limited to CESC Limited. In 2011, CESC became a part of the RP-Sanjiv Goenka Group, which was formed on 13 July 2011 by Sanjiv Goenka, the youngest son of Dr RP Goenka, the late founder of RPG Enterprises.

== Operations ==
Load-shedding (interruption of power supply due to shortage of electricity) was common in Kolkata during the 1970s and 1980s. But from 1990s, the situation had improved and the Calcutta power grid has progressively given better performance and fewer outages.

CESC owns and operates 4 thermal power plants generating a total of 1,225 MW of power. It also operates two 20 MW gas turbine units as a Peak Load Power Plant to compensate the need for additional power demand during the peak hours. The company has also established its footprint in unconventional energy with a 9 MW solar project in Gujarat and a 50 MW wind project in Rajasthan. It is also developing three hydro power projects, with a combined capacity of 236 MW, in Arunachal Pradesh. In addition, the RP-Sanjiv Goenka Group has four captive power plants, with a combined capacity of 76 MW, which are fuelled by the process waste gas produced at its four carbon black manufacturing units in India. There is a 40 MW power plant running on coal washery rejects and carbonaceous shale at the coal mining operations in Asansol. More than 80% CESC customers' electricity requirement is met from its own generating plants, balance electricity is purchased from third parties. Its captive coal mines provide about 50% of the coal requirement. The remainder is mostly provided by Coal India Limited.

CESC also has its own Transmission & Distribution system through which it supplies electricity to its consumers. This system comprises a 474-kilometre (295 mi) circuit of transmission lines linking the company's generating and receiving stations with 85 distribution stations; a 3,837-kilometre (2,384 mi) circuit of HT lines further linking distribution stations with LT substations, large industrial consumers and a 9,867-kilometre (6,131 mi) circuit of LT lines connecting its LT substations to LT consumers.

CESC has recently started expansion into renewable energy sector through its subsidiary Purvah Green Projects Ltd, and aiming to build 300 MW solar portfolio.

=== Existing power plants ===
Power station	Location	Installed Capacity (MW)	Type
Budge Budge Thermal Power Station	Budge Budge, Kolkata, West Bengal	750	Coal-fired
Southern Thermal Power Station	Garden Reach, Kolkata, West Bengal	135	Coal-fired
Dhariwal Power Station	Chandrapur, Maharashtra	600	Coal-fired
Haldia Energy Power Station	Haldia, West Bengal	600	Coal-fired
TOTAL		2,085	

CESC's vintage Mulajore power station, which was located in north Kolkata, was shut down on 15 May 2004. It was inaugurated by the then Bengal Governor Sir John Arthur Herbert in January 1940 and was one of the oldest plants in the system of CESC. The plant employed around 500 employees but hardly generated more than 25 MW, even though it had a derated capacity of 60 MW. With a high auxiliary consumption (the energy required to generate power), it used to feed just about 18 MW to the system. The New Cossipore and the Mulajore plants together used to generate only 10% of CESC's power generation but accounted for 59% of the company's workforce. Following the sale of Mulajore plant and machinery, the 43 acres (0.17 km^{2}) of land was used to set up an industrial-cum-residential township venture executed by CESC Properties, a wholly owned CESC subsidiary. CESC's New Cossipore unit, in turn, was hamstrung by a serious pollution constraint and was hauled up by West Bengal Pollution Control Board last year.

=== Power Plants outside Kolkata ===
In September 2013, the first unit of CESC's 2×300 MW thermal power project, and the first one outside West Bengal, was successfully synchronised at Chandrapur, Maharashtra. A 400 kV transmission line will feed the generated power from the power station to the grid. The company had entered into power purchase agreement with the Tamil Nadu State electricity distribution utility for 100 MW daily supplies at INR 4.91 a unit from its Chandrapur power plant.
