= Damodar River =

River in Jharkhand and West Bengal, India

Coordinates: 22°17′N 88°05′E

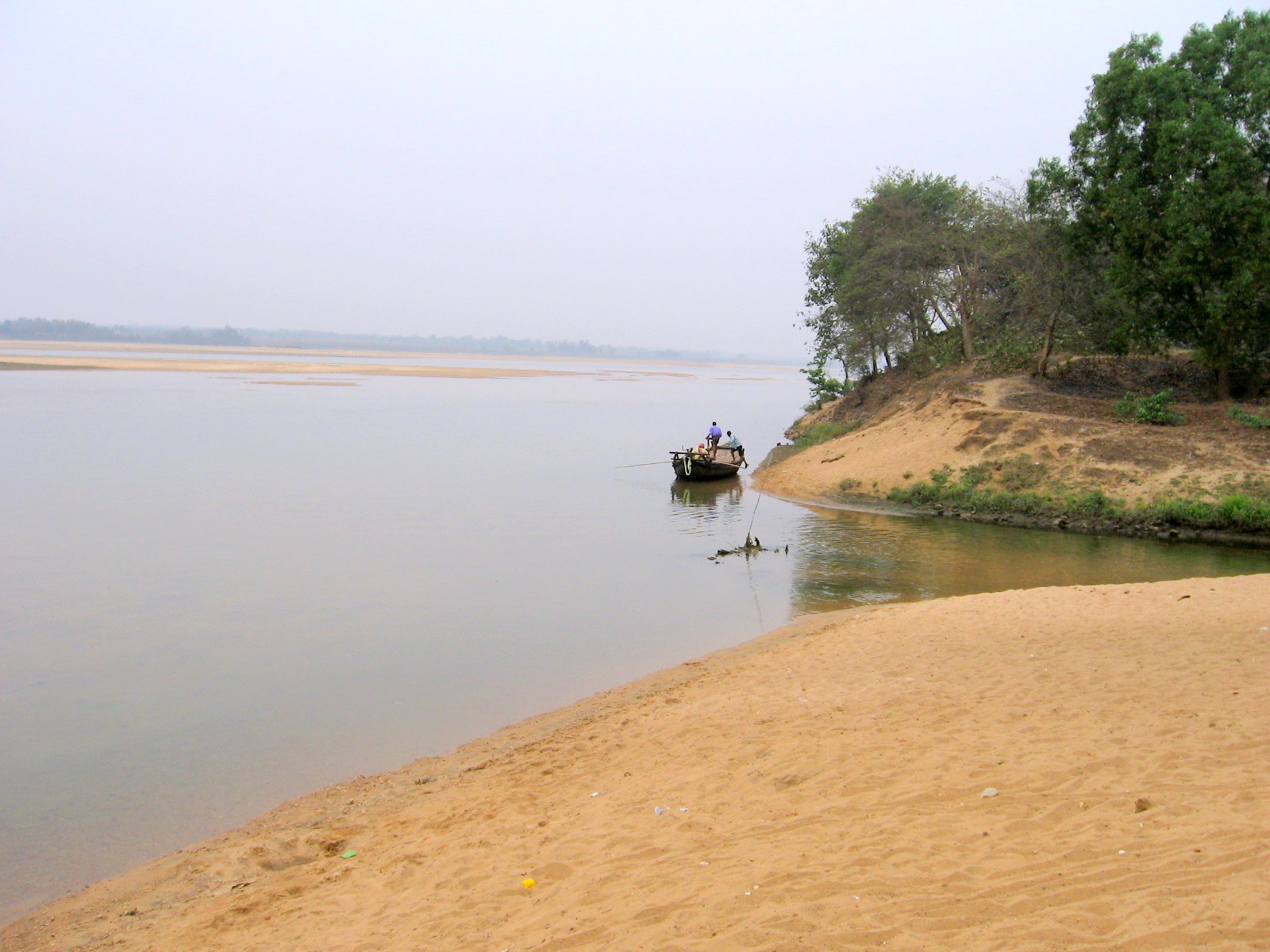
- Damodar River in the lower reaches of the Chota Nagpur Plateau in dry season

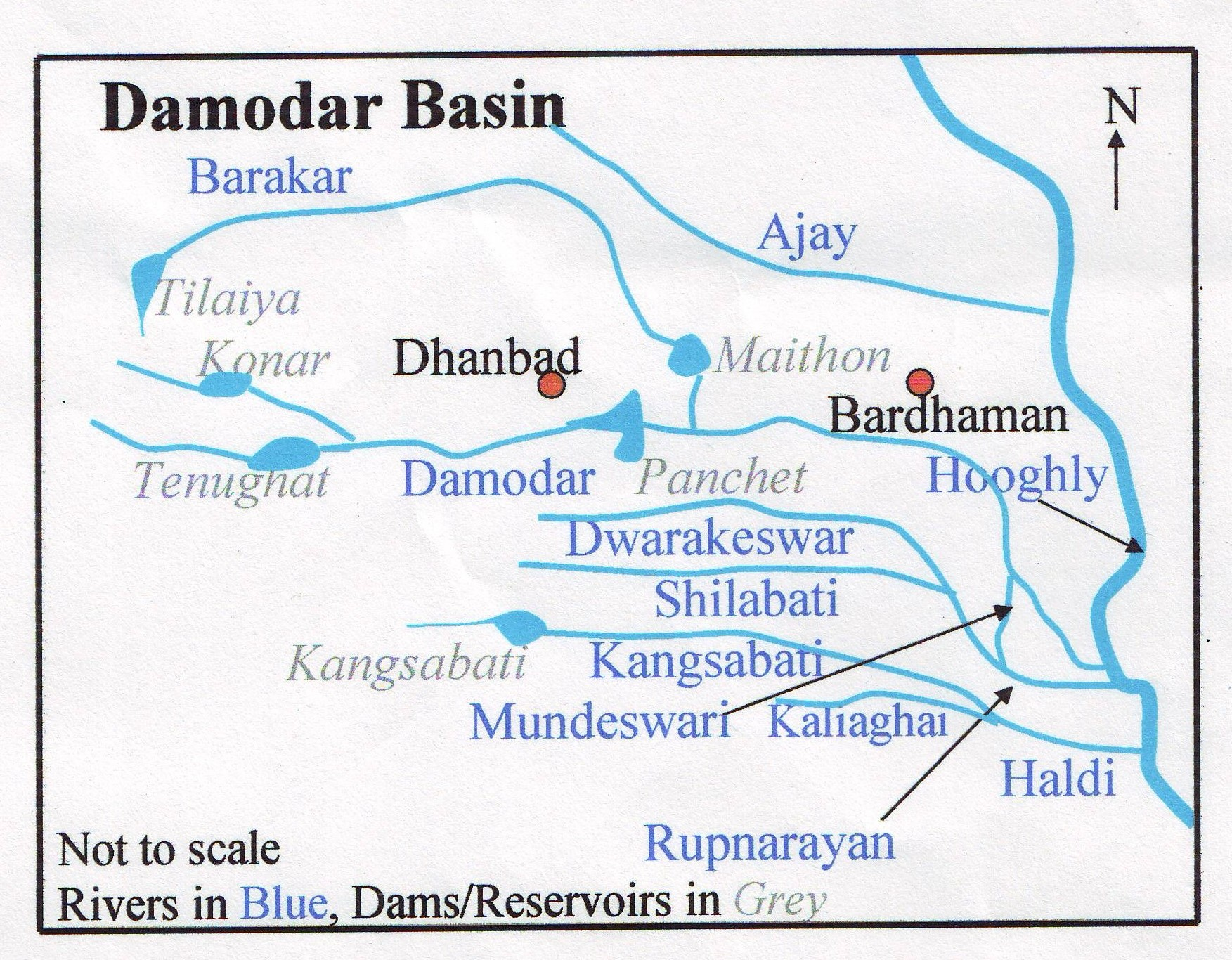
- Damodar Map

Location
- Country: India
- Location: Jharkhand, West Bengal

Physical characteristics
- Source
  - location: Chulhapani, Latehar district, Chota Nagpur Plateau, Jharkhand
- Mouth
  - location: Hooghly River, Howrah district, West Bengal
- Length: 592 km (368 mi)
- Discharge
  - average: 296 m^{3}/s (10,500 cu ft/s)

Basin features
- Tributaries
  - left: Barakar, Konar, Jamunia, Nunia
  - right: Sali River (West Bengal)

Damodar River (Pron: /ˈdʌmoˌdaː/) is a river flowing across the Indian states of Jharkhand and West Bengal. The valley is rich in mineral resources and is known for large-scale mining and industrial activity. It was also known as the Sorrow of Bengal because of the ravaging floods it caused in the plains of West Bengal. The construction of several dams on the Damodar and its tributaries has helped control some of the flooding.

== Etymology ==
Damodar means "rope around the belly", derived from Sanskrit दाम (dama) "rope" and उदर (udara) "belly". Damodar is also another name given to the Hindu god Krishna because his foster-mother, Yashoda, had tied him to a large urn.

== Course ==
The Damodar is a rain-fed river. It originates in Khamarpat Hill on Chotanagpur Plateau in Jharkhand. It travels 368 miles (592 km) before joining the Hooghly River in Howrah, in West Bengal.

== Tributaries ==
Damodar River has a number of tributaries and subtributaries, such as Barakar, Konar, Bokaro, Haharo, Jamunia, Ghari, Guaia, Khadia and Bhera. The Damodar and the Barakar trifurcate the Chota Nagpur plateau. The rivers pass through hilly areas with great force, sweeping away whatever lies in their path. Two bridges on the Grand Trunk Road near Barhi in Hazaribagh district were torn down by the Barakar: the great stone bridge in 1913 and the subsequent iron bridge in 1946.

== River of Sorrows ==
The Chota Nagpur Plateau receives an average annual rainfall of around 1,400 mm (55 in), almost all of it in the monsoon months between June and August. The huge volume of water that flows down the Damodar and its tributaries during the monsoons used to be a fury in the upper reaches of the valley. In the lower valley it used to overflow its banks and flood large areas.

Damodar River was earlier known as the "River of Sorrows" as it used to flood many areas of Bardhaman, Hooghly, Howrah and Medinipur districts.

The floods were virtually an annual ritual. In some years the damage was probably more. Many of the great floods of the Damodar are recorded in history — 1770, 1855, 1866, 1873–74, 1875–76, 1884–85, 1891–92, 1897, 1900, 1907, 1913, 1927, 1930, 1935 and 1943. In four of these floods (1770, 1855, 1913 and 1943) most of Bardhaman town was flooded.

In 1789 an agreement was signed between Maharaja Kirti Chand of Burdwan and the East India Company wherein the Maharaja was asked to pay an additional amount of ₹193,721 (equivalent to ₹110 million, US$1.2 million or £890,000 in 2023) for the construction and maintenance of embankment to prevent floods. However, these ran into dispute and in 1866 and 1873, The Bengal Embankment Act was passed, transferring the powers to build and maintain embankment to the government.

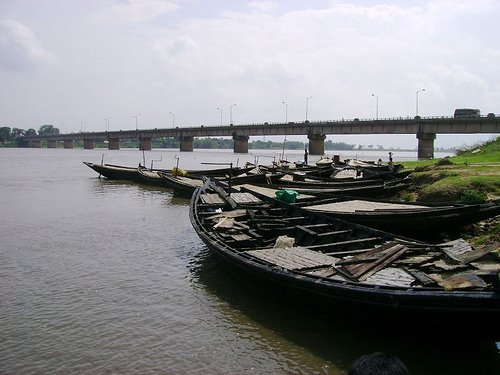
Krishak Setu over the Damodar River, near Bardhaman

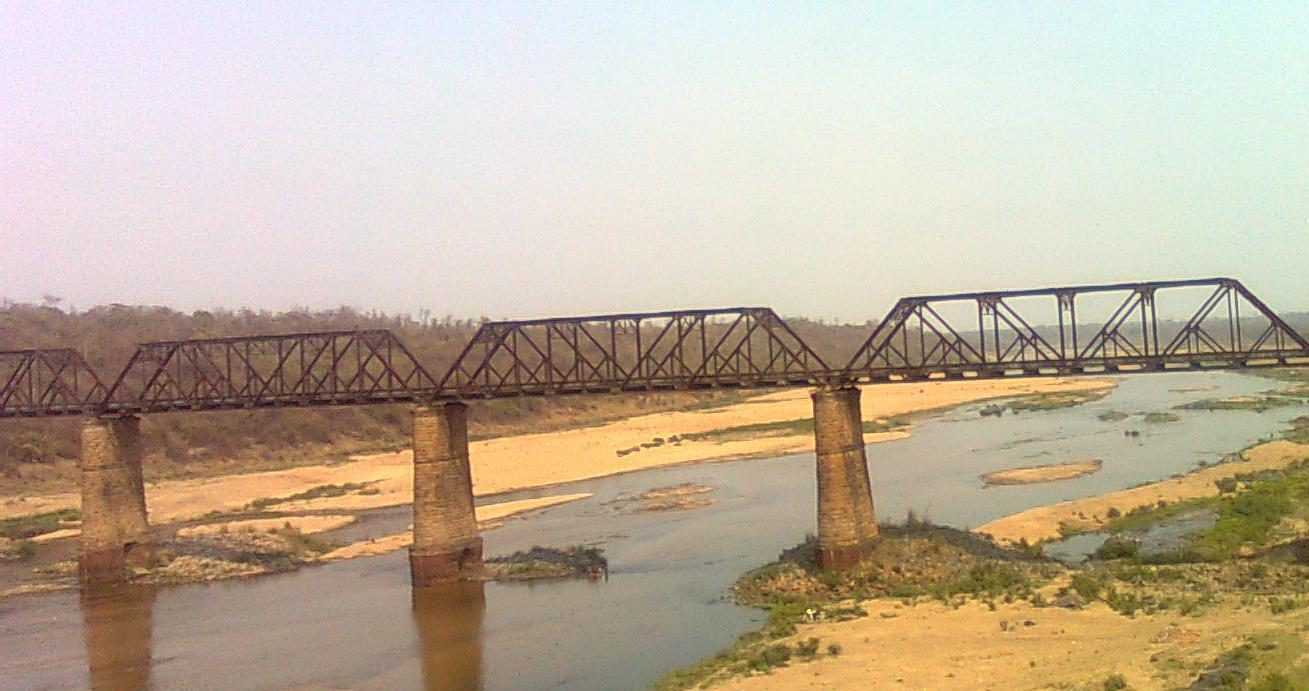
Damodar River between Dhanbad and Bokaro

So great was the devastation every year that the floods passed into folklore, as the following Bhadu song testifies:

We have sown the crops in Asar
We will bring Bhadu in Bhadra.
Floods have swollen the Damodar
The sailing boats cannot sail.
O Damodar! We fall at your feet
Reduce the floods a little.
Bhadu will come a year later
Let the boats sail on your surface.

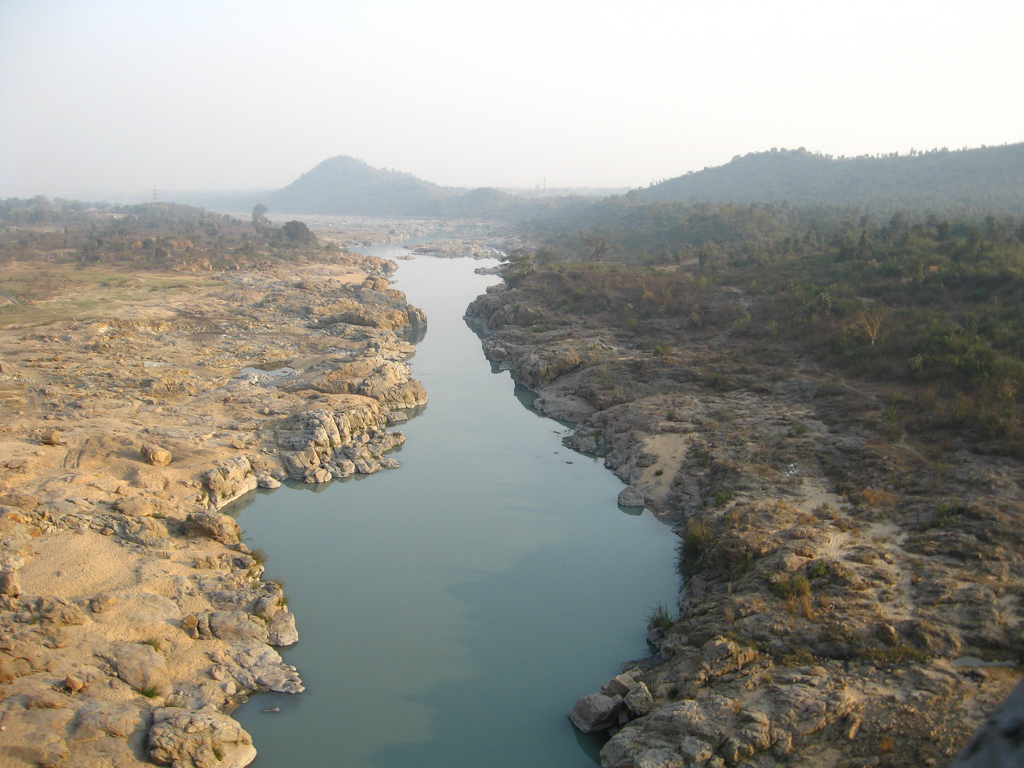
The Damodar in its upper reaches

== Damodar Valley ==
The Damodar Valley is spread across Hazaribagh, Ramgarh, latehar, Dhanbad, Bokaro and Chatra, Ranchi districts in Jharkhand and Bardhaman and Hooghly districts in West Bengal and partially covers Palamu, Ranchi, Lohardaga and Dumka districts in Jharkhand and Howrah, Bankura and Purulia districts in West Bengal with a command area of 24,235 square kilometres (9,357 mi^{2}).

The Damodar valley is rich in coal. It is considered as the prime centre of coking coal in the country. Massive deposits are found in the central basin spreading over 2,883 square kilometres (1,113 mi^{2}). The important coalfields in the basin are Jharia, Raniganj, West Bokaro, East Bokaro, Ramgarh, South Karanpura and North Karanpura.

The Damodar Valley is one of the most industrialised parts of India. Three integrated steel plants (Bokaro, Burnpur and Durgapur) of Steel Authority of India Limited (SAIL) and other factories are in the valley.

=== Damodar Valley Corporation (D.V.C.) ===
Several dams have been constructed in the valley, for the generation of hydroelectric power. The valley is called "the Ruhr of India". Damodar Valley Corporation, popularly known as DVC, came into being on July 7, 1948, by an Act of the Constituent Assembly of India (Act No. XIV of 1948) as the first multipurpose river valley project of independent India. It is modeled on the Tennessee Valley Authority of the United States.

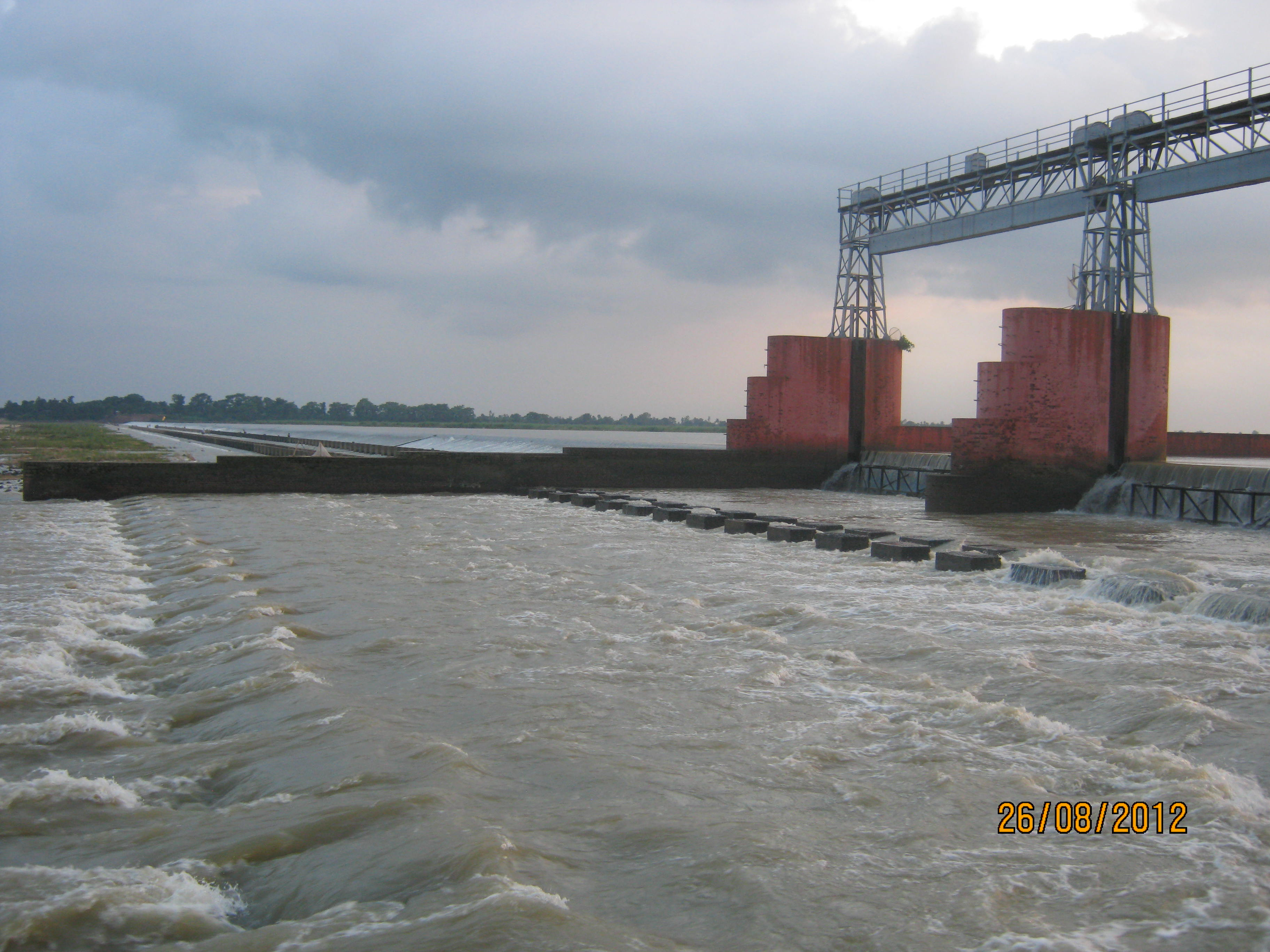
Randihaweir on lower Damodar

The initial focus of the DVC were flood control, irrigation, generation, transmission and distribution of electricity, eco-conservation and afforestation, as well as job creation for the socio-economic well-being of the people residing in and around areas affected by DVC projects. However, over the past few decades, power generation has gained priority. Other objectives of the DVC remain part of its primary responsibility. The dams in the valley have a capacity to moderate peak floods of 7,100 to 18,400 cubic metres per second (250,000 to 650,000 cu ft/s). DVC has created irrigation potential of 3,640 square kilometres (1,410 mi^{2}).

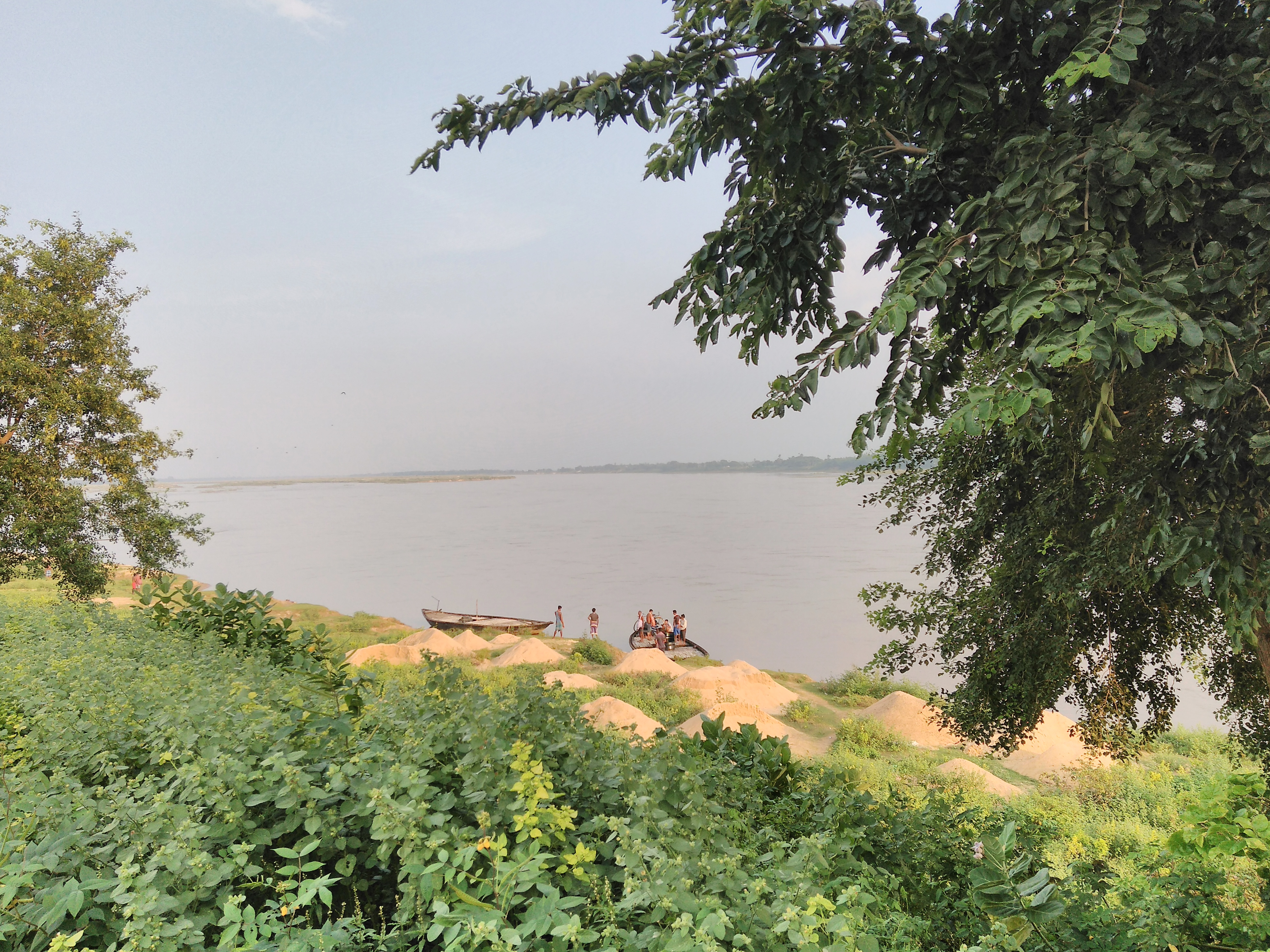
Damodar River Beach Burdwan

The first dam was built across the Barakar River, a tributary of the Damodar river at Tilaiya in 1953. The second one was built across the Konar River, another tributary of the Damodar river at Konar in 1955. Two dams across the rivers Barakar and Damodar were built at Maithon in 1957 and Panchet in 1958. Both the dams are some 8 kilometres (5 mi) upstream of the confluence point of the rivers. These four major dams are controlled by DVC. Durgapur Barrage was constructed downstream of the four dams in 1955, across the Damodar river at Durgapur, with head regulators for canals on either side for feeding an extensive system of canals and distributaries. In 1978, the government of Bihar (that was before the formation of the state of Jharkhand) constructed the Tenughat Dam across the Damodar river outside the control of DVC. It proposes constructing a dam across the Barakar river at Belpahari in Jharkhand state.
