= Damodar Valley Corporation =

Multipurpose river valley project in India

- Type: Statutory body
- Industry: Energy
- Founded: 7 July 1948; 78 years ago
- Headquarters: Kolkata, West Bengal, India
- Key people: Shri Rajesh Pandey (Chairman)
- Products: Electricity
- Services: Electricity generation and Transmission, distribution, production, Soil conservation Flood Moderation
- Revenue: ▲₹25,320 crore (US$2.6 billion) (2024-2025)
- Net income: ▲₹704 crore (US$73 million) (2023)
- Total assets: ▲₹48,977 crore (US$5.1 billion) (2023)
- Total equity: ▲₹12,812 crore (US$1.3 billion) (2023)
- Number of employees: 5243 (2024)
- Parent: Ministry of Power, Government of India
- Website: dvc.gov.in

Damodar Valley Corporation (DVC) is a statutory corporation which operates in the Damodar River area of West Bengal and Jharkhand states of India to handle the Damodar Valley Project, the first multipurpose river valley project of independent India. Astrophysicist Meghnad Saha played a pioneering role in conceptualizing and advocating for the Damodar Valley Project. DVC operates both thermal power stations and hydel power stations under the ownership of Ministry of Power, Government of India. DVC is headquartered in the Kolkata, West Bengal, India.

DVC is currently undergoing corporatization and restructuring to explore the possibility of an IPO to raise funds for expansion.

== History ==
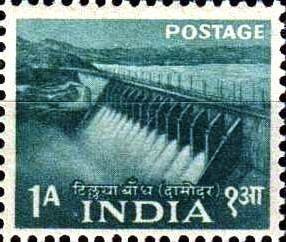
1955 postal stamp

The valley of the Damodar River was flood prone and the devastating flood of 1943, lead to the formation of the high-powered "Damodar Flood Enquiry Committee" by the government of Bengal. The committee recommended the formation of a body similar to the Tennessee Valley Authority of the United States. Subsequently, W.L. Voorduin, a senior engineer of TVA, was appointed to study the problem. He suggested the multi-purpose development of the valley as a whole in 1944. Damodar Valley Corporation was set up in 1948 as "the first multipurpose river valley project of independent India."

DVC was formed with the central government and the governments of Bihar (later Jharkhand) and West Bengal participating in it. The main aims of the corporation were flood control, irrigation, generation and transmission of electricity, and year-round navigation. The corporation was also expected to provide indirect support for the over-all development of the region. However, while Voorduin had proposed the construction of eight dams, DVC built only four.

Mr. Voorduin's "Preliminary Memorandum" suggested a multipurpose development plan designed for achieving flood control, irrigation, power generation and navigation in the Damodar Valley. Four consultants appointed by the Government of India examined it. They also approved the main technical features of Voorduin's scheme and recommended early initiation of construction beginning with Tilaiya to be followed by Maithon. By April 1947, full agreement was practically reached between the three Governments of Central, West Bengal and Bihar on the implementation of the scheme and in March 1948, the Damodar Valley Corporation Act (Act No. XIV of 1948) was passed by the Central Legislature, requiring the three Governments, The Central Government and the State Governments of West Bengal and Bihar to participate jointly for the purpose of building the Damodar Valley Corporation. The Corporation came into existence on 7 July 1948 as the first multipurpose river valley project of independent India.

The first dam was built across the Barakar River at Tilaiya and inaugurated in 1953. The second dam, Konar Dam, across the Konar River was inaugurated in 1955. The third dam across the Barakar River at Maithon was inaugurated in 1957. The DVC Rest House at Maithon was renamed Mazumder Niwas after ICS Sir S.N. Mozumdar(1904-1981) to honor his legacy as the 1st founding Chairman of DVC. Durgapur Barrage was built in 1955, with a 136.8 kilometres (85.0 mi) long left bank main canal and an 88.5 kilometres (55.0 mi) long right bank main canal. The fourth dam across the Damodar at Panchet was inaugurated in 1959.

Command area: 24,235 km^{2} spread across the Damodar basin. Jharkhand: 2 districts fully (Dhanbad and Bokaro) and parts of 9 districts (Hazaribagh, Koderma, Chatra, Ramgarh, Palamau, Ranchi, Lohardaga, Giridih, and Dumka) West Bengal: 6 districts (Purba Bardhhaman, Paschim Bardhhaman, Hooghly, Howrah, Bankura and Purulia)

== DVC plants ==
Thermal Plants (coal based)
Power Plant Name	State	Installed Capacity in MW	Remarks
Mejia Thermal Power Station - A&B	West Bengal	4×210 + 2×250 + 2×500 = 2,340	
Raghunathpur Thermal Power Station	West Bengal	2×600=1,200	Upcoming 2×660 MW
Durgapur Steel Thermal Power Station	West Bengal	2×500=1,000	
Durgapur Thermal Power Station	West Bengal	0	Upcoming 1×800 MW
Koderma Thermal Power Station	Jharkhand	2×500=1,000	Upcoming 2×800 MW
Chandrapura Thermal Power Station - A&B	Jharkhand	2×250=500	Upcoming 1×800 MW
Bokaro Thermal Power Station - A&B	Jharkhand	1×500	
Total		6540	

Hydel-Power Plants
Power Plant Name	State	Installed Capacity in MW
Panchet Dam	Jharkhand	80
Maithon Dam	Jharkhand	63.2
Tilaiya Dam	Jharkhand	4
Konar Dam	Jharkhand	Nil
Total		147.2

Joint ventures
Power Plant Name	State	Installed Capacity in MW	Remarks
Maithon Power Limited	Jharkhand	2×525=1,050	Owned by Maithon Power Limited a joint venture between DVC and Tata Power
BPSCL Power Plant	Jharkhand	338	Owned by Bokaro Power Supply Corporation Limited (BPSCL) a joint venture between DVC and Bokaro Steel Limited

== Infrastructure ==
DVC developed and expanded its infrastructure to six thermal power stations (6750 MW) and three hydro-electric power stations with a capacity of 147.2 MW which contribute to a total installed capacity of 6897.2 MW. Presently DVC has 49 sub-stations and receiving stations more than 8390-circuit km of transmission and distribution lines. DVC has also four dams, a barrage and a network of canals (2494 km) that play an effective role in water management. The construction of check dams, development of forests and farms and upland and wasteland treatment developed by DVC play a vital role in eco-conservation and environmental management.

== Water management ==
DVC has a network of four dams - Tilaiya and Maithon on Barakar River, Panchet on Damodar river and Konar on Konar river. Besides, Durgapur barrage and the canal network, handed over to the Government of West Bengal in 1964, remained a part of the total system of water management. DVC dams are capable of moderating floods of 6.51 lac cusec to 2.5 lac cusecs.

Four multipurpose dams were constructed during the period 1948 to 1959:

- Tilaiya Dam (1953)
- Konar Dam (1955)
- Maithon Dam (1957)
- Panchet Dam (1959)

Flood reserve capacity of 1,292 mcm has been provided in 4 reservoirs, which can moderate a peak flood of 18,395 cumecs to a safe carrying capacity of 7,076 cumecs. 419 mcm of water is stored in the 4 DVC reservoirs to supply 680 cusecs of water to meet industrial, municipal and domestic requirements in West Bengal & Jharkhand. The Durgapur barrage on river Damodar was constructed in 1955 for the supply of irrigation water to the districts of Burdwan, Bankura & Hooghly.

- Irrigation Command Area (Gross): 569,000 hectares (5,690 km^{2})
- Irrigation Potential Created: 364,000 hectares (3,640 km^{2})
- Canals: 2,494 km (1,550 mi)

30,000 hectares (300 km^{2}) of land in the upper valley is being irrigated, every year by lift irrigation with the water available from 16,000 (approx) check dams constructed by DVC.

== Solar floating plants ==
- DVC Mejia Floating Solar PV Park: A floating solar PV park in India
- DVC Chandrapura Thermal Floating Solar PV Park: 10 MW Floating Solar park in Bokaro, Jharkhand.
- DVC Raghunathpur Floating Solar PV Park: An under-construction 10 MW Floating Solar plant in West bengal
- DVC Konar Floating Solar PV Plant: is an under-construction 50 MW solar PV power project in Jharkhand that and expected to be commercial operation in 2027

Damodar Valley Plans 1.7 GW of Floating Solar Projects in West Bengal and Jharkhand.

== Joint venture projects ==
Bokaro Power Supply Corporation Limited (BPSCL)

A joint venture of DVC and SAIL has been established to operate and maintain the captive power and steam generation plant, hived off by SAIL and its Bokaro Steel Plant and supply power and steam exclusively to Bokaro Steel Ltd.

DVC EMTA Coal Mines Limited

A joint venture company formed with Eastern Minerals & Trading Agency for development and operation of Captive Coal Mine Blocks and supply of coal exclusively to DVC Thermal Power Projects of 10th and 11th plan.

Maithon Power Limited

Maithon Power Ltd., a joint venture between Tata Power and Damodar Valley Corporation, is one of the first greenfield public-private partnership (PPP) power projects in India. Operational since 2011, the plant contributes significantly to the energy grid and DVC’s power distribution capacity.

Mining & Allied Machinery Corporation (MAMC)

The Mining and Allied Machinery Corporation (MAMC) in Durgapur – one of the PSU's in India set up under the rupee-rouble agreement and enjoying Soviet patronage in the early 1960s. Bharat Earth Movers has the highest stake (48%) in the consortium while the other two PSUs – DVC and Coal India – have 26% stake each.

== Pumped storage plants ==
In 2018, DVC announced plans to build six 250 MW pump storage hydel power plants at Lagu Pahar on the Bokaro River.

== Organisation Structure ==
- Chairman
- Member Secretary
- Member (Technical)
- Member Finance
