= List of power stations in India =

The total installed power generation capacity in India as of 31 July 2026 is around 552 GW, with sectors and types as shown below.

For the state wise installed power generation capacity, refer to States of India by installed power capacity.

Installed power station capacity in India as of July 31, 2026 (in MW)
Sector	Fossil (thermal power)					Non-fossil (clean power)				Total (MW)
Sector	Coal	Lignite	Gas	Diesel	Total fossil	Nuclear	Large hydro	Renewable	Total non-fossil	Total (MW)
Central	74710	3640	7237.91	-	85587.91	8780	18538.72	13181.29	40500.01	126087.92
State	76385	1150	6961	280.31	84776.32	-	27524.94	18446.63	45971.57	130747.89
Private	73062.51	1830	5923.50	308.89	81124.90	-	6001	208033.06	214034.06	295158.96
All India	224157.51	6620	20122.41	589.20	251489.13	8780	51414.66	239660.98	300505.64	551994.77
Percentage	40.61	1.20	3.65	0.11	45.57 %	1.59	9.31	43.43	54.43 %	100

Hydroelectric power plants with ≤ 25 MW generation capacity are included in the renewable category (classified as SHP - small hydro project).

The breakdown of renewable energy sources is:

- Solar power - 164,594.75 MW (includes ground mounted solar, rooftop solar, hybrid solar, off-grid solar and PM KUSUM)
- Wind power - 58,136.89 MW
- Biomass / cogeneration - 10,869.17 MW
- Small hydro - 5,181.76 MW
- Waste-to-energy - 878.40 MW

The following lists name many of the utility power stations in India.

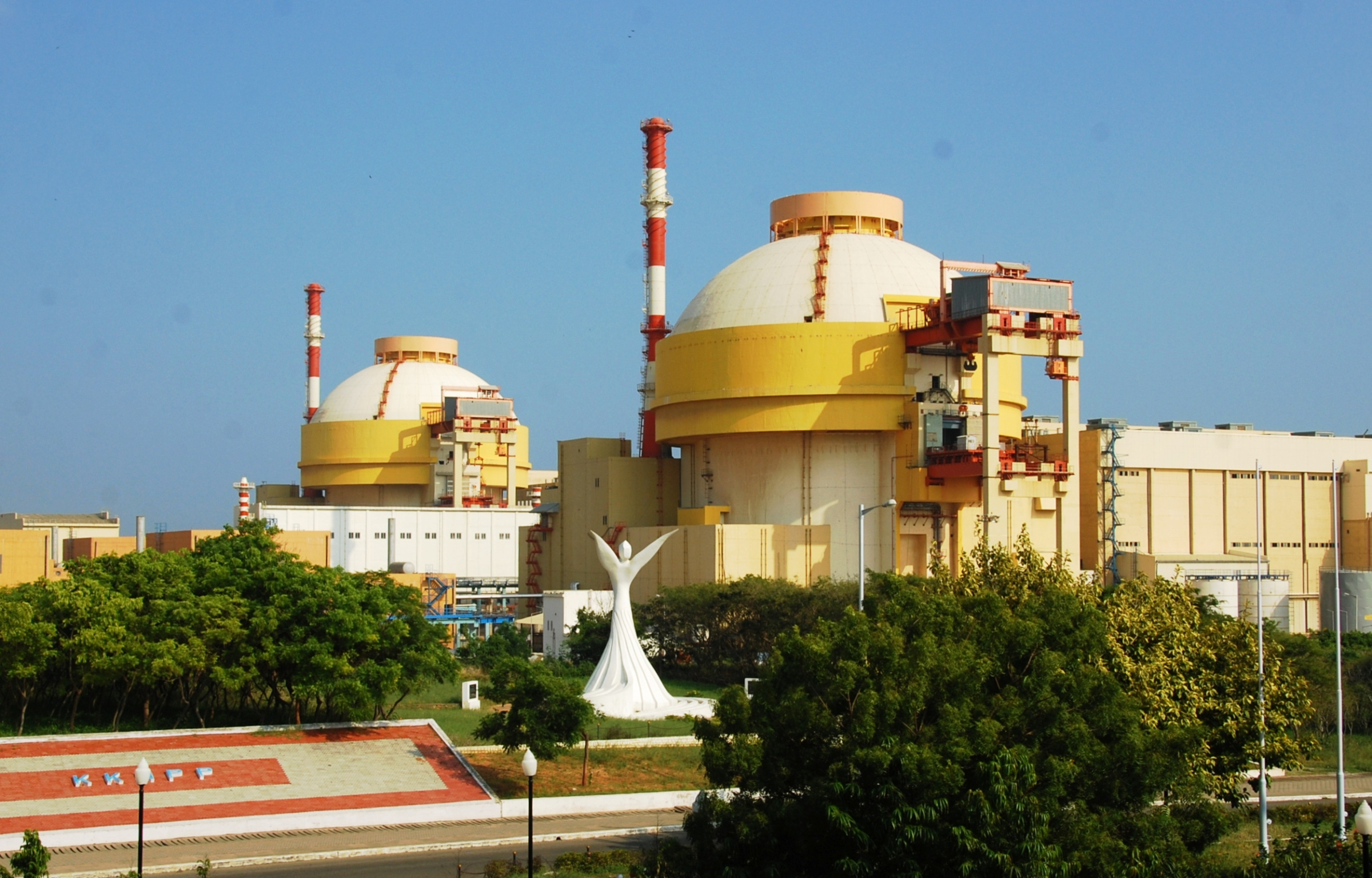
Kudankulam Nuclear Power Plant has an installed capacity of 2,000 MW. This station is being expanded to 6,000 MW capacity.

== Conventional ==
=== Nuclear power ===
As of 30 April 2025, India has 25 operational nuclear reactors with a installed capacity of 8880 MW (1.9 % of total installed capacity) accounting for around 3% of electricity generation. Ten more reactors with total capacity of 8000 MW are under construction.

$ → Retired/scrapped power stations

Power station	Location	District	State	Coordinates	Reactor units (MW) (including under construction)	Installed capacity (MW)	Under construction (MW)	Operator	Establishment date
Western			2		8	3,240			
Kakrapar Atomic Power Station	Kakrapar	Surat	Gujarat	21°14′09″N 73°21′03″E	2 x 220, 2 x 700	1,840		NPCIL	May 6, 1993
Tarapur Atomic Power Station	Tarapur	Palghar	Maharashtra	19°49′51″N 72°39′30″E	2 x 160, 2 x 540	1,400		NPCIL	October 28, 1969
Southern			3		15	3,320	5,900		
Kudankulam Nuclear Power Plant	Kudankulam	Tirunelveli	Tamil Nadu	08°10′03″N 77°42′46″E	2 x 1,000, 4 x 1,000	2,000	4,000	NPCIL	October 22, 2013
Kaiga Nuclear Power Plant	Kaiga	Uttara Kannada	Karnataka	14°51′53″N 74°26′19″E	4 x 220, 2 x 700	880	1,400	NPCIL	November 16, 2000
Madras Atomic Power Station	Kalpakkam	Kancheepuram	Tamil Nadu	12°33′27″N 80°10′31″E	2 x 220, 1 x 500	440	500	NPCIL	January 24, 1984
Northern			3		11	2,220	2,100		
Rajasthan Atomic Power Station	Rawatbhata	Chittogarh	Rajasthan	24°52′20″N 75°36′50″E	1 x 200, 4 x 220, 1 x 700, 1 x 700	1,780	700	NPCIL	December 16, 1973
Rajasthan Atomic Power Station	Rawatbhata	Chittogarh	Rajasthan	24°52′20″N 75°36′50″E	1 x 100^{$}	-		Department of Atomic Energy (DAE)	December 16, 1973
Narora Atomic Power Station	Narora	Bulandshahr	Uttar Pradesh	28°09′26″N 78°24′34″E	2 x 220	440		NPCIL	January 1, 1991
Gorakhpur Nuclear Power Plant	Fatehabad	Fatehabad	Haryana	29°26′59″N 75°40′48″E	2 x 700	-	1,400	NPCIL	
Total			8		34	8,880	8,000		

=== Thermal power ===
Thermal power is the largest source of power in India. There are different types of thermal power plants based on the fuel used to generate the steam, such as coal, gas, diesel, and natural gas. About 71% of the electricity consumed in India is generated by thermal power plants.

==== Coal ====
More than 62% of India's electricity demand is met through the country's vast coal reserves. Public sector undertaking National Thermal Power Corporation (NTPC) and several other state level power generating companies are engaged in operating coal-based thermal power plants. Apart from NTPC and other state level operators, some private companies also operate the power plants. One coal plant was given environmental clearance in 2021. Although new plants are unlikely to be built, if more coal is burnt in existing plants it will increase greenhouse gas emissions by India. Here is some list of operating coal-based thermal power plants in India.

$ → Retired/scrapped power stations

Name	Location	District	State	Region	Coordinates	Unit capacities	Capacity (MW)	Operator	Sector
Vindhyachal Super Thermal Power Station	Vindhya Nagar	Singrauli	Madhya Pradesh	Western	24°05′53″N 82°40′18″E	6 x 210, 7x 500	4,760	NTPC	Central
Mundra Thermal Power Station	Mundra	Kutch	Gujarat	Western	22°49′22″N 69°33′10″E	4 x 330, 5 X 660	4,620	Adani Power	Private
Mundra Ultra Mega Power Project	Mundra	Kutch	Gujarat	Western	22°49′22″N 69°33′10″E	5 X 800	4,000	Tata Power	Private
Sasan Ultra Mega Power Project	Sasan	Singrauli	Madhya Pradesh	Western		6 x 660	3,960	Reliance Power	Private
KSK Mahanadi Power Project	Nariyara	Janjgir–Champa district	Chhattisgarh	Western	22°49′22″N 69°33′10″E	6 X 600	3,600	KSK Energy Ventures	Private
Jindal Tamnar Thermal Power Plant	Tamnar	Raigarh	Chhattisgarh	Western	22°06′16″N 83°27′04″E	4 x 250, 4 x 600	3,400	JSPL	Private
Chandrapur Super Thermal Power Station	Urjanagar	Chandrapur	Maharashtra	Western	20°00′24″N 79°17′21″E	2 x 210^{$}, 4 x 210, 5 x 500	3,340	MSPGCL (MAHAGENCO)	State
Tirora Thermal Power Station	Tirora	Gondia	Maharashtra	Western	21°24′58″N 79°58′3″E	5 X 660	3,300	Adani Power	Private
Sipat Thermal Power Plant	Sipat	Bilaspur	Chhattisgarh	Western	22°07′57″N 82°17′24″E	2 x 500,3 x 660	2,980	NTPC	Central
RKM Powergen Thermal Power Plant	Dhobnipali	Shakti	Chhattisgarh	Western		4×360	1440	R. K. M Powergen Private Limited	Private
Korba Super Thermal Power Plant	Jamani Palli	Korba	Chhattisgarh	Western	22°23′11″N 82°40′58″E	3 x 200, 4 x 500	2,600	NTPC	Central
Sant Singaji Thermal Power Plant	Dogaliya, Mundi	khandwa	Madhya Pradesh	Western		2 X 600, 2 X 660	2,520	MPPGC	State
Wanakbori Thermal Power Station	Wanakbori	Kheda	Gujarat	Western	22°52′39″N 73°21′35″E	7 x 210, 1 × 800	2,270	GSECL	State
Dada Dhuniwale Thermal Power Plant	Guyda, Mundi	khandwa	Madhya Pradesh	Western		2 X 800	1,600	MPPGC	State
Bhusawal Thermal Power Station	Deepnagar	Jalgaon	Maharashtra	Western	21°02′57″N 75°50′32″E	2 x 210^{$}, 2 x 500	1,000	MSPGCL (MAHAGENCO)	State
Trombay Thermal Power Station	Trombay	Mumbai	Maharashtra	Western	19°00′09″N 72°53′54″E	1 x 150^{$}, 2 x 500^{$}, 1 x 250	750	Tata Power	Private
Amravati Thermal Power Plant	Nandgaonpeth	Amravati	Maharashtra	Western	21°04′49″N 77°54′06″E	5 X 270, (5 X 270)	1,350	Indiabulls	Private
Khaparkheda Thermal Power Station	Kaparkheda	Nagpur	Maharashtra	Western	21°16′55″N 79°06′54″E	4 x 210, 1 x 500	1,340	MSPGCL (MAHAGENCO)	State
Sanjay Gandhi Thermal Power Station	Birsinghpur	Umaria	Madhya Pradesh	Western	23°18′18″N 81°03′51″E	4 x 210, 1 x 500	1,340	MPPGCL	State
Satpura Thermal Power Station	Sarni	Betul	Madhya Pradesh	Western	22°06′33″N 78°10′24″E	5 x 62.5^{$}, 1 x 200, 3 x 210, 2 x 250	1,330	MPPGCL	State
Essar Salaya Power Plant	Salaya	Jamnagar district	Gujarat	Western	22°17′54.71″N 69°43′10.17″E	2X600	1,200	Essar Energy	Private IPP
DB Thermal Project Ltd.	Tundri	Janjgir-Champa	Chhattisgarh	Eastern	22°26′00″N 83°10′47″E	2X600	1,200	DB POWER	Private IPP
Parli Thermal Power Station	Parli-Vaijnath	Beed	Maharashtra	Western	18°54′21″N 76°32′36″E	3 x 210^{$}, 2 x 210^{$}, 2 x 250	500	MSPGCL (MAHAGENCO)	State
Gandhinagar Thermal Power Station	Gandhinagar	Gandhinagar	Gujarat	Western	23°14′59″N 72°40′26″E	2 x 120^{$}, 3 x 210	630	GSECL	State
Ukai Thermal Power Station	Ukai dam	Tapi	Gujarat	Western	21°12′39″N 73°33′26″E	2 x 120^{$}, 2 x 200, 1 x 210, 1 x 500	1110	GSECL	State
Hasdeo Thermal Power Station		Korba	Chhattisgarh	Western	22°24′45″N 82°41′19″E	4 x 210	840	CSPGCL	State
Nashik Thermal Power Station	Nashik	Nashik	Maharashtra	Western	19°58′50″N 73°53′29″E	3 x 210	630	MSPGCL (MAHAGENCO)	State
Koradi Thermal Power Station	Koradi	Nagpur	Maharashtra	Western	21°14′52″N 79°05′53″E	2 x 210^{$}, 3 x 660	2400	MSPGCL (MAHAGENCO)	State
Lanco Amarkantak Power Plant	Pathadi	Korba	Chhattisgarh	Western	22°14′44″N 82°43′24″E	2 x 300	600	Lanco Infratech	Private
Wardha Warora Power Plant	Warora	Chandrapur	Maharashtra	Western	20.272483108514376, 78.98085239550917	4 x 135	540	KSK Energy Ventures	Private
Dr Shyama Prasad Mukharjee Thermal Power Station		Korba	Chhattisgarh	Western	22°22′12″N 82°43′16″E	2 x 250	500	CSPGCL	State
Dahanu Thermal Power Station	Dahanu	Thane	Maharashtra	Western	19°57′12″N 72°44′54″E	2 x 250	500	Adani Power	Private
Paras Thermal Power Station	Vidyutnagar	Akola	Maharashtra	Western	20°42′55″N 76°47′37″E	2 x 250	500	MSPGCL (MAHAGENCO)	State
KSK Mahanadi Power Project	Nariyara	Bilaspur	Chhattisgarh	Western		1 x 135	135	KSK Energy Ventures	Private
NSPCL Bhilai Power Plant	Bhilai	Durg	Chhattisgarh	Western	21°10′58″N 81°25′28″E	2 x 250	500	NSPCL	Central
Surat Thermal Power Station	Nani Naroli	Surat	Gujarat	Western	21°23′46″N 73°06′22″E	4 x 125	500	Gujarat Industries Power Company Ltd.	State
Amarkantak Thermal Power Station	Chachai	Anuppur	Madhya Pradesh	Western	23°09′52″N 81°38′17″E	2 x 120^{$}, 1 x 210	210	MPPGCL	State
Bhawnendra Singh Deo Power Plant		Korba	Chhattisgarh	Western	22°23′01″N 82°43′08″E	4 x 50^{$}, 2 x 120^{$}	0	CSPGCL	State
Sabarmati Thermal Power Station	Ahmedabad	Ahmedabad	Gujarat	Western	23°04′14″N 72°35′38″E	1 x 60^{$}, 1 x 120, 2 x 121	362	Torrent Power	Private
CESC Chandrapur Thermal Power Station	Chandrapur	Chandrapur	Maharashtra	Western		2 x 300	600	CESC	Private
Kutch Thermal Power Station	Panandhro	Kutch	Gujarat	Western	23°39′50″N 68°47′01″E	2 x 70^{$}, 2 x 75	150	GSECL	State
Akrimota Thermal Power Station	Chher Nani	Kutch	Gujarat	Western	23°46′21″N 68°38′44″E	2 x 125	250	GMDC	State
Sikka Thermal Power Station	Jamnagar	Jamnagar	Gujarat	Western	22°25′20″N 69°49′37″E	2 x 120^{$}, 2 x 250	500	GSECL	State
Dhuvaran Thermal Power Station	Khambhat	Anand	Gujarat	Western	22°13′59″N 72°45′25″E	2 x 110^{$}	-	GSECL	State
Western				39		140	67,029.01		
Rihand Thermal Power Station	Rihand Nagar	Sonbhadra	Uttar Pradesh	Northern	24°01′39″N 82°47′28″E	6 x 500	3,000	NTPC	Central
Singrauli Super Thermal Power Station	Shaktinagar	Sonbhadra	Uttar Pradesh	Northern	24°06′16″N 82°42′27″E	5 x 200, 2 x 500	2,000	NTPC	Central
NTPC Dadri	Vidyutnagar	Gautam Budh Nagar	Uttar Pradesh	Northern	28°36′04″N 77°36′25″E	4 x 210, 2 x 490	1,820	NTPC	Central
Anpara Thermal Power Station	Anpara	Sonbhadra	Uttar Pradesh	Northern	24°12′11″N 82°47′18″E	3 x 210, 2 x 500, 2X500	2,630	UPRVUNL	State
Suratgarh Super Thermal Power Plant	Suratgarh	Sri Ganganagar	Rajasthan	Northern	29°10′56″N 74°01′09″E	6 x 250	1,500	RVUNL	State
Panipat Thermal Power Station	Assan	Panipat	Haryana	Northern		2 x 250, 2 x 210^{$}, 4 x 110^{$}	710	HPGCL	State
Obra Thermal Power Station	Obra	Sonbhadra	Uttar Pradesh	Northern	24°26′41″N 82°58′41″E	2 x 50^{$}, 1 x 40, 1 x 94^{$}, 2 x 94, 5 x 200	1,188	UPRVUNL	State
Guru Gobind Singh Super Thermal Power Plant	Ghanauli	Rupnagar	Punjab	Northern	31°02′32″N 76°35′02″E	4 x 210,^{$} 4 x 210	840	PSPCL	State
Talwandi Sabo Power Project	Banawala	Mansa	Punjab	Northern	29°53′31″N 75°12′53″E	3 × 660	1980	Vedanta Limited	Private
Kota Super Thermal Power Plant	Kota	Kota	Rajasthan	Northern	25°10′17″N 75°48′54″E	2 x 110, 3 x 210, 2 x 195	1,240	RVUNL	State
Rosa Thermal Power Plant	Rosa	Shahjahanpur	Uttar Pradesh	Northern	27°49′07″N 79°56′10″E	4 x 300	1,200	Reliance Power Limited	Private
Rajiv Gandhi Thermal Power Station	Khedar	Hisar	Haryana	Northern	29°21′25″N 75°52′02″E	2 x 600	1,200	HPGCL	State
Indira Gandhi Super Thermal Power Project	Jharli	Jhajjar	Haryana	Northern	29°21′25″N 75°52′02″E	3 x 500	1,500	Aravali Power Company India Limited	Central
Raj West Lignite Power Plant	Barmer	Barmer	Rajasthan	Northern	25°53′20″N 71°19′25″E	8 x 135	1,080	JSW Energy	Private
Feroj Gandhi Unchahar Thermal Power Plant	Unchahar	Raebareli	Uttar Pradesh	Northern	25°54′52″N 81°19′33″E	5 x 210	1,050	NTPC	Central
Guru Hargobind TP	Lehra Mohabbat	Bathinda	Punjab	Northern	30°16′04″N 75°09′53″E	2 x 210^{$}, 2 x 250	500	PSPCL	State
Badarpur Thermal Power Station	Badarpur	New Delhi	Delhi	Northern	28°30′22″N 77°18′26″E	3 x 95^{$}, 2 x 210^{$}	-	NTPC	Central
Parichha Thermal Power Station	Parichha	Jhansi	Uttar Pradesh	Northern	25°30′51″N 78°45′36″E	2 x 110, 2 x 210, 2 x 250	1140	UPRVUNL	State
Lalitpur Thermal Power Station	Mehroni	Lalitpur	Uttar Pradesh	Northern	25°30′53″N 78°45′34″E	3 x 660	1980	Bajaj Hindustan Ltd.	Joint
Deenbandhu Chhotu Ram Thermal Power Station	Yamuna Nagar	Yamuna Nagar	Haryana	Northern		2 x 300	600	HPGCL	State
Chhabra Thermal Power Plant	Mothipura	Baran	Rajasthan	Northern	24°37′14″N 77°02′10″E	2 x 250	500	RVUNL	State
Guru Nanak Dev Thermal Plant	Bathinda	Bathinda	Punjab	Northern	30°14′02″N 74°55′26″E	4 x 110^{$}	00	PSPCL	State
Tanda Thermal Power Plant	Vidyutnagar	Ambedkar Nagar	Uttar Pradesh	Northern	26°35′22″N 82°36′04″E	4 x 110	440	NTPC	Central
Barsingsar Thermal Power Station	Barsingsar	Bikaner	Rajasthan	Northern	27°49′09″N 73°12′28″E	2 x 125	250	NLC	Central
Giral Lignite Power Plant	Thumbli	Barmer	Rajasthan	Northern	26°02′44″N 71°15′13″E	2 x 125	250	RVUNL	State
Harduaganj Thermal Power Station	Harduaganj	Aligarh	Uttar Pradesh	Northern	28°01′00″N 78°07′50″E	1 x 55, 1 x 60^{$}, 1 x 105	160	UPRVUNL	State
Panki Thermal Power Station	Panki	Kanpur	Uttar Pradesh	Northern	26°28′35″N 80°14′31″E	2 x 105^{$}		UPRVUNL	State
Rajghat Power Station	Rajghat	New Delhi	Delhi	Northern		2 X 67.5^{$}	-	IPGCL	State
VS Lignite Power Plant	Gurha	Bikaner	Rajasthan	Northern	27°51′18″N 72°51′22″E	1 x 135	135	KSK Energy Ventures	Private
Faridabad Thermal Power Station	Faridabad	Faridabad	Haryana	Northern	28°22′28″N 77°18′21″E	1 x 55	55	HPGCL	State
Northern				27		107	42,923.50		
Barh Super Thermal Power Station	Barh	Patna	Bihar	Eastern	25°14′34″N 87°15′48″E	3 x 660, 2 x 660	3,300	NTPC	Central
Talcher Super Thermal Power Station	Kaniha	Angul	Odisha	Eastern, Southern	21°05′49″N 85°04′30″E	2 x 500, 4 X 500	3,000	NTPC	Central
Sterlite Jharsuguda Power Station	Jharsuguda	Jharsuguda	Odisha	Eastern	21°48′49″N 84°02′23″E	4x600	2,400	Vedanta	Private
Mejia Thermal Power Station	Durlavpur	Bankura	West Bengal	Eastern	23°27′47″N 87°07′51″E	4 x 210, 2 x 250, 2 x 500	2,340	DVC	Central
Kahalgaon Super Thermal Power Station	Kahalgaon	Bhagalpur	Bihar	Eastern	25°14′34″N 87°15′48″E	4 x 210, 3 x 500	2,340	NTPC	Central
Farakka Super Thermal Power Station	Farakka	Murshidabad	West Bengal	Eastern	24°46′23″N 87°53′43″E	3 x 200, 2 x 500, 1 x 500	2,100	NTPC	Central
Nabinagar Super Thermal Power Project	Nabinagar	Aurangabad	Bihar	Eastern	25°14′34″N 87°15′48″E	3 x 660	1,980	NTPC	Central
Vedanta Jharsuguda Captive Power Plant	Jharsuguda	Jharsuguda	Odisha	Eastern	21°47′08″N 84°03′18″E	9x135	1,215	Vedanta	Private
Kolaghat Thermal Power Station	Mecheda	East Midnapore	West Bengal	Eastern	22°25′00″N 87°52′15″E	6 x 210	1,260	WBPDCL	State
Chandrapura Thermal Power Station	Chandrapura	Bokaro	Jharkhand	Eastern		3 x 130^{$}, 3 x 120, 2 x 250	860	DVC	Central
Angul Thermal Power Station	Angul	Angul	Odisha	Eastern	21°07′29″N 84°58′51″E	2x600	1,200	Jindal India Thermal Power	Private
National Aluminium Company Captive Power Plant	Angul	Angul	Odisha	Eastern	20°51′11″N 85°11′26″E	10 x 120	1,200	NALCO	State
Kamalanga Thermal Power Plant	Dhenkanal	Dhenkanal	Odisha	Eastern	20°52′24″N 85°16′28″E	3x350	1,050	GMR Group	State
Bakreshwar Thermal Power Station	Suri	Birbhum	West Bengal	Eastern	23°49′43″N 87°27′06″E	5 x 210	1,050	WBPDCL	State
Maithon Power Plant	Maithon	Dhanbad	Jharkhand	Eastern		2 X 525	1,050	DVC, Tata Power	Central
Durgapur Steel Thermal Power Station	Durgapur	Bardhaman	West Bengal	Eastern	23°27′47″N 87°07′51″E	2 x 500	1,000	DVC	Central
Koderma Thermal Power Station	Kodarma	Koderma	Jharkhand	Eastern	23°27′47″N 87°07′51″E	2 x 500	1,000	DVC	Central
Bhartiya Rail Bijlee Company Limited (BRBCL)	Nabinagar	Aurangabad	Bihar	Eastern	25°14′34″N 87°15′48″E	4x 250	1,000	NTPC	Central
Ib Thermal Power Station	Banharpali	Jharsuguda	Odisha	Eastern	21°41′23″N 83°51′36″E	8 x 120	960	OPGCL	State
Barauni Thermal Power Station	Barauni	Begusarai	Bihar	Eastern	25°23′59″N 86°01′20″E	2 x 50, 2 x 105, 2 x 250	810	NTPC	State
Patratu Thermal Power Station	Patratu	Ramgarh Cantonment	Jharkhand	Eastern	23°38′27″N 85°17′36″E	4 x 40^{$}, 2 x 90^{$}, 2 x 105^{$}, 2 x 110^{$}	840	JSEB	State
Budge Budge Thermal Power Plant	Budge Budge	South 24 Paraganas	West Bengal	Eastern	22°28′09″N 88°08′23″E	3 x 250	750	CESCL	Private
Santaldih Thermal Power Station	Santaldih	Purulia	West Bengal	Eastern	23°36′08″N 86°28′06″E	4 x 120^{$}, 2 x 250	500	WBPDCL	State
Durgapur Thermal Power Station	Durgapur	Bardhaman	West Bengal	Eastern	23°31′09″N 87°18′05″E	2 x 30^{$}, 1 x 70^{$}, 2 x 75^{$}, 1 x 110, 1 x 300	410	DVC	State
Bokaro Thermal Power Station	Bokaro	Bokaro	Jharkhand	Eastern	23°47′04″N 85°52′50″E	2 x 210^{$}, 1 x 210, 1 x 500	710	DVC	Central
Kanti Thermal Power Station	Kanti	Muzaffarpur	Bihar	Eastern	26°11′41″N 85°18′06″E	2 x 110, 2 x 195	610	NTPC	State
Sagardighi Thermal Power Station	Monigram	Murshidabad	West Bengal	Eastern	24°22′44″N 88°05′44″E	2 x 300 2X 500	1600	WBPDCL	State
Talcher Thermal Power Station	Talcher	Angul	Odisha	Eastern	20°54′41″N 85°12′27″E	4 x 60, 2 x 110	460	NTPC	Central
Bandel Thermal Power Station	Bandel	Hooghly	West Bengal	Eastern	22°59′44″N 88°24′13″E	4 x 60, 1 x 210	450	WBPDCL	State
Jojobera Thermal Power Plant	Jojobera	East Singhbhum	Jharkhand	Eastern	22°45′21″N 86°14′57″E	3 x 120, 1x67.5	427.5	Tata Power	Private
Tenughat Thermal Power Station	Lalpania	Bokaro	Jharkhand	Eastern	23°43′38″N 85°45′53″E	2 x 210	420	TVNL	State
Hirakud Captive Power Plant	Hirakud	Sambalpur	Odisha	Eastern	21°47′08″N 84°03′18″E	1 x 67.5, 3 x 100	367.5	Hindalco Industries	Private CPP
Durgapur Thermal Power Station	Durgapur	Bardhaman	West Bengal	Eastern	23°31′59″N 87°15′00″E	1 x 140^{$}, 1 x 210	210	DVC	Central
Titagarh Thermal Power Station	Titagarh	North 24 Paraganas	West Bengal	Eastern	22°43′56″N 88°22′11″E	4 x 60	240	CESCL	Private
CESC Southern Generating Station	Kolkata	Kolkata	West Bengal	Eastern	22°32′58″N 88°17′29″E	3 x 67.5	135	CESCL	Private
New Cossipore Generating Station	Cossipore	Kolkata	West Bengal	Eastern		2 x 30^{$}, 2 x 50^{$}, 1 x 100	100	CESCL	Private
Eastern				35		104	28,892.87		
NTPC Ramagundam	Ramagundam	Peddapalli	Telangana	Southern	18°45′31″N 79°27′17″E	3 x 200, 4 x 500	2,600	NTPC	Central
Simhadri Super Thermal Power Plant	Visakhapatnam	Visakhapatnam	Andhra Pradesh	Southern	17°35′38″N 83°5′23″E	4 x 500	2,000	NTPC	Central
Neyveli Thermal Power Station II	Neyveli	Cuddalore	Tamil Nadu	Southern	11°33′28″N 79°26′31″E	7 x 210, 2 x 250	1,970	NLC	Central
Dr Narla Tatarao TPS	Ibrahimpatnam	Krishna	Andhra Pradesh	Southern	16°35′58″N 80°32′12″E	6 x 210, 1 x 500 1 x 800	2,560	APGENCO	State
Raichur Thermal Power Station	Shaktinagar	Raichur	Karnataka	Southern	16°21′20″N 77°20′36″E	7 x 210, 1 x 250	1,720	KPCL	State
Kothagudem Thermal Power Station	Paloncha	Khammam	Telangana	Southern	17°37′18″N 80°41′15″E	4 x 60^{$}, 4 x 120^{$}, 2 x 250, 1 x 500, 1 x 800	1,800	TSGENCO	State
Sri Damodaram Sanjeevaiah Thermal Power Station	Krishnapatnam	Nellore	Andhra Pradesh	Southern	14°19′39″N 80°07′15″E	3 x 800	2,400	APPDCL	State
Vallur Thermal Power Station	Vallur	Chennai	Tamil Nadu	Southern		3 x 500	1,500	NTPC & TNEB	State & central
Sembcorp Gayatri Power Complex	Krishnapatnam	Nellore	Andhra Pradesh	Southern	14°19′45″N 80°08′27″E	4 x 660	2,640	SGPC	Private
Udupi Power Plant	Nandicoor	Udupi	Karnataka	Southern	13°08′49″N 74°48′02″E	2 x 600	1,200	Adani Power	Private
Singareni Thermal Power Plant	Pegadapalli	Mancherial	Telangana	Southern		2 x 600	1,200	Singareni Collieries Company	PSU
Adani Thermal Power Plant	Godda	Godda	Jharkhand	Eastern		2 x 660	1,320	Adani Power Jharkhand Limited	Private
Tuticorin Thermal Power Station	Tuticorin	Tuticorin	Tamil Nadu	Southern	08°45′44″N 78°10′32″E	5 x 210	1,050	TNEB	State
Rayalaseema Thermal Power Station	Kadapa	Kadapa	Andhra Pradesh	Southern	14°42′14″N 78°27′29″E	5 x 210, 1 x 600	1,650	APGENCO	State
Neyveli Thermal Power Station I	Neyveli	Cuddalore	Tamil Nadu	Southern	11°35′34″N 79°28′17″E	6 x 50^{$}, 3 x 100^{$}, 2 x 210	420	NLC	Central
NTPL Thermal Power Station	Thoothukudi	Thoothukudi	Tamil Nadu	Southern	8°45′32″N 78°10′54.8″E	2 x 500	1,000	NLC & TNEB	State & central
JSW Vijayanagar Power Station	Toranagallu	Bellary	Karnataka	Southern	15°10′54″N 76°40′36″E	2 x 130, 2 x 300	860	JSW Energy	Private
Mettur Thermal Power Station	Mettur	Salem	Tamil Nadu	Southern	11°46′19″N 77°48′49″E	4 x 210, 1 x 600	1,440	TNEB	State
North Chennai Thermal Power Station	Athipattu	Chennai	Tamil Nadu	Southern	13°15′12″N 80°19′41″E	3 x 210, 2 x 600	1,830	TNEB	State
Mutiara Thermal Power Plant	Thoothukudi	Thoothukudi	Tamil Nadu	Southern	8°54′52″N 78°08′40.2″E	2 x 600	1200	Coastal Energen Private Limited (CEPL)	Private
Cuddalore IL&FS Thermal Power Station	Cuddalore	Cuddalore	Tamil Nadu	Southern		2 x 600	1200	IL&FS Tamil Nadu Power Company Limited (ITPCL)	Private
Simhapuri Thermal Power Station	Krishnapatnam	Nellore	Andhra Pradesh	Southern	14°12′35″N 80°05′23″E	4 x 150	600	Simhapuri Energy Limited	Private
Hinduja Thermal Power Station	Devada	Visakhapatnam	Andhra Pradesh	Southern	17°33′45″N 83°8′15″E	2 x 520	1,040	Hinduja National Power Corporation Limited	Private
Kakatiya Thermal Power Station	Chelpur	Warangal	Telangana	Southern	18°23′02″N 79°49′42″E	1 x 500	500	TSGENCO	State
Bellary Thermal Power station	Kudatini	Bellary	Karnataka	Southern	15°11′37″N 76°43′16″E	2 x 500 1x700	1700	KPCL	State
Yermarus Thermal Power Station	Yermarus	Raichur	Karnataka	Southern	16°17′39″N 77°21′19″E	2 x 800	1600	KPCL	State
Ennore Thermal Power Station	Ennore	Chennai	Tamil Nadu	Southern	13°12′07″N 80°18′40″E	2 x 60^{$}, 3 x 110^{$}		TNEB	State
Ind-Barath Thermal Power Plant	Tuticorin	Tuticorin	Tamil Nadu	Southern		2 x 150	300	Ind-Barath Power Infra Limited	Private
Meenakshi Power Plant	Krishnapatnam	Nellore	Andhra Pradesh	Southern	14°12′57″N 80°05′19″E	2 x 150	300	MEPL	Private
Neyveli Zero Lignite Power Station	Neyveli	Cuddalore	Tamil Nadu	Southern	11°32′33″N 79°24′57″E	1 x 250	250	TAQA	Private
Ramagundam B Thermal Power Station	Ramagundam	Karimnagar	Telangana	Southern	18°43′31″N 79°30′47″E	1 x 62.5	62.5	TSGENCO	State
Southern				19		83	30,842.5		
Total				117		434	169,387.88		

==== Gas-based ====
The total installed capacity of natural gas based power plants in India is nearly 24,991.51 MW as of September 2018. Here is a list of plants operating and waiting for natural gas to start operations.

$ → Retired/scrapped power stations

Power station	Location	District	State	Region	Coordinates	Unit capacities	Capacity (MW)	Operator	Sector
Dabhol Power Station	Anganvel	Ratnagiri	Maharashtra	Western	17°33′35″N 73°09′59″E	1 x 740, 1 x 740, 1 x 740	2,220	RGPPL	Central
SUGEN Combined Cycle Power Plant	Akhakhol	Surat	Gujarat	Western		3 x 382.5	1,147.5	Torrent	Private
Uran Gas Turbine Power Station	Bokadvira	Raigarh	Maharashtra	Western	18°52′55″N 72°58′13″E	4 x 108, 2 x 120	672	MSPGCL (MAHAGENCO)	State
Pioneer Power CCPP			Maharashtra	Western		1 x 388	388		Private
GPEC Combined Cycle Power Plant	Paguthan	Bharuch	Gujarat	Western	21°46′49″N 72°58′46″E	3 x 135, 1 x 250	655	CLP Group	Private
Jhanor-Gandhar TPS	Urjanagar	Bharuch	Gujarat	Western	21°46′48″N 72°58′45″E	3 x 131, 1 x 255	648	NTPC	Central
Kawas TPS	Adityanagar	Surat	Gujarat	Western	21°10′33″N 72°41′14″E	4 x 106, 2 x 110.5	645	NTPC	Central
Essar Combined Cycle Power Plant	Hazira	Surat	Gujarat	Western	21°06′39″N 72°39′19″E	3 x 110, 1 x 185	515	Essar Power Limited	Private
Utran Gas Based Power Station	Utran	Surat	Gujarat	Western	21°13′44″N 72°52′14″E	3 x 30^{$}, 1 x 45^{$}, 1 x 228, 1 x 155	383	GSECL	State
Vadodara Gas Based CCPP	Vadodara	Vadodara	Gujarat	Western		1 x 111, 1 x 54, 1 x 49, 3 x 32	310	GIPCL	State
Dhuvaran Gas Based CCPP	Khambhat	Anand	Gujarat	Western	22°14′24″N 72°45′09″E	1 x 72.51, 1 x 67.85, 1 x 39.94, 1 x 38.77, 1 x 285.65	594.72	GSECL	State
Trombay Gas Power Station	Trombay	Mumbai	Maharashtra	Western	19°00′12″N 72°54′14″E	1 x 120, 1 x 60	180	Tata	Private
GSEG Combined Cycle Power Plant	Hazira	Surat	Gujarat	Western	21°09′57″N 72°42′16″E	3 x 52	156	GSEG	Private
Vatva Combined Cycle Power Plant	Vatva	Ahamadabad	Gujarat	Western	Retired	2 x 32.5, 1 x 35		Torrent Power	Private
Pipavav Combined Cycle Power Plant	Pipavav	Amreli	Gujarat	Western		2 x 352	702	GSPC	State
Hazira CCPP	Hazira	Surat	Gujarat	Western		1 x 156, 1 x 351	507		State
D-Gen Mega			Gujarat	Western		1 x 1200	1200		Private
G - IPCL			Gujarat	Western		1 x 145	145		Private
Unosugen CCPP	Dahej		Gujarat	Western		1 x 382.5	382.5	Torrent	Private
Goa Gas Power Station	Zuarinagar	Goa	Goa	Western	15°12′38″N 73°52′37″E	1 x 32, 1 x 16	48	RSPCL	Private
Western				19		59	11,151.22		
Pragati Gas Power Station	Bawana	New Delhi	Delhi	Northern		1 x 121.2, 2 x 104.6	330.4	PPCL	State
Pragati-III Combined Cycle Power Plant	Bawana	New Delhi	Delhi	Northern		6 x 250	1,500	PPCL	State
Rithala GT	Rohini	New Delhi	Delhi	Northern		1 x 108	108	NDPL	State
National Capital TPP	Vidyutnagar	Gautam Budh Nagar	Uttar Pradesh	Northern	28°35′38″N 77°36′38″E	4 x 131, 2 x 146.5	817	NTPC	Central
Auraiya Thermal Power Station	Dibiyapur	Auraiya	Uttar Pradesh	Northern	26°37′50″N 79°39′41″E	4 x 110, 2 x 106	652	NTPC	Central
Faridabad Thermal Power Plant	Mujedi	Faridabad	Haryana	Northern	28°20′49″N 77°21′42″E	2 x 143, 1 x 144	430	NTPC	Central
Anta Thermal Power Station	Anta	Baran	Rajasthan	Northern	25°10′47″N 76°19′08″E	3 x 88, 1 x 149	413	NTPC	Central
Dholpur Combined Cycle Power Station	Purani Chaoni	Dholpur	Rajasthan	Northern	26°42′09″N 77°50′56″E	3 x 110	330	RVUNL	State
IPGCL Gas Turbine Power Station	New Delhi	New Delhi	Delhi	Northern		9 x 30	270	IPGCL	State
Pampore Gas Turbine Station	Pampore	Pulwama	Jammu and Kashmir	Northern		7 x 25	175	J&K Govt	State
Ramgarh Gas Thermal Power Station		Ramgarh	Rajasthan	Northern		1 x 3, 1 x 35.5, 1 x 37.5, 1 x 37.8	113.8	RVUNL	State
Khashipur Shravanthi CCPP			Uttarakhand	Northern		2 x 225	450		Private
Beta Infratech CCPP			Uttarakhand	Northern		1 x 225	225		Private
Gama Infraprop CCPP			Uttarakhand	Northern		1 x 225	225		Private
Northern				14		55	6,038.2		
APGPCL Plant	Vijjeswaram	West Godavari	Andhra Pradesh	Southern	16°56′02″N 81°43′27″E	2 x 33, 1 x 34, 1 x 172	272	APGPCL	Joint
Lanco Kondapalli Power Plant	Kondapalli	Krishna	Andhra Pradesh	Southern	16°38′20″N 80°33′00″E	1 x 233, 1 x 133, 1 x 128.99, 2 x 119.57, 1 x 732	1466	Lanco Infratech	Private
Gautami Combined Cycle Power Plant	Peddapuram	East Godavari	Andhra Pradesh	Southern	17°02′21″N 82°08′43″E	2 x 145, 1 x 174	464	GVK	Private
Konaseema Combined Cycle Power Plant	Ravulapalem	East Godavari	Andhra Pradesh	Southern	16°44′05″N 81°51′44″E	2 x 140, 1 x 165	445	Konaseema Gas Power Limited (KGPL)	Private
Vemagiri Combined Cycle Power Plant	Vemagiri	East Godavari	Andhra Pradesh	Southern	16°55′29″N 81°48′46″E	1 x 137, 1 x 233	370	GMR	Private
GMR Rajamundry Combined Cycle Power Plant	Vemagiri	East Godavari	Andhra Pradesh	Southern	16°55′28″N 81°48′46″E	1 x 768	768	GMR	Private
Samarlakota Combined Cycle Power Plant	Samarlakota	East Godavari	Andhra Pradesh	Southern	17°02′19″N 82°08′05″E	1 x 140, 1 x 80, 3 x 800	2620	Reliance	Private
Jegurupadu Combined Cycle Power Plant	Jegurupadu	East Godavari	Andhra Pradesh	Southern	16°55′54″N 81°51′36″E	2 x 46, 1 x 49, 1 x 75	445	GVK	Private
Spectrum Combined Cycle Power Plant	Kakinada	East Godavari	Andhra Pradesh	Southern	17°03′31″N 82°18′34″E	2 x 46, 1 x 47, 1 x 70	209	Spectrum	Private
GMR (barge mounted) Power Plant	Kakinada	East Godavari	Andhra Pradesh	Southern	17°03′32″N 82°18′33″E	1 x 237	237	GMR	Private
Panduranga CCPP	Annadevarapeta	West Godavari	Andhra Pradesh	Southern			116.0	PESPL	Private
RVK Energy power plant	Rajahmundry	East Godavari	Andhra Pradesh	Southern		1×28	28.0	KVK	Private
Sriba power plant	Chigurukota	Krishna	Andhra Pradesh	Southern			30.0	Sriba industries	Private
Silkroad sugar power plant	Kakinada	East Godavari	Andhra Pradesh	Southern			35.0	EID Parry	Private
Kusalava power plant, GMK Formerly	Gollapallem	East Godavari	Andhra Pradesh	Southern		2×1.1,1×1	3.2	Triveni	Private
Gas engine power plant	Pashamylaram	Medak	Telangana	Southern			35.0	Astha power	Private
Kochi Combined Cycle Power Station	Kochi	Ernakulam	Kerala	Southern	10°4′27″N 76°19′8″E	3 x 40.50, 1 x 35.5	157	BSES	Private
Rajiv Gandhi CCPP	Kayamkulam	Alappuzha	Kerala	Southern	09°14′19″N 76°25′49″E	2 x 115.20, 1 x 129.18	359.58	NTPC	Central
Valuthur Gas Turbine Power Station	Valuthur	Ramanathapuram	Tamil Nadu	Southern		1 x 61, 1 x 59.8, 1 x 34, 1 x 32.3	187.1	TNEB	State
Basin Bridge Gas Turbine Power Station	Chennai	Chennai	Tamil Nadu	Southern	13°05′55″N 80°16′10″E	4 x 30	120	TNEB	State
Aban Combined Cycle Power Plant	Karuppur	Tanjore	Tamil Nadu	Southern	11°07′16″N 79°31′45″E	1 x 74.41, 1 x 38.80	113.21	Lanco Infratech	Private
Kovikalpal Gas Turbine Power Station	Thirumakkottai	Thiruvarur	Tamil Nadu	Southern	10°32′29″N 79°27′1″E	1 x 70, 1 x 38.88	108.88	TNEB	State
Kuttalam Gas Turbine Power Station	Maruthur	Nagapattinam	Tamil Nadu	Southern		1 x 64, 1 x 37	101	TNEB	State
PPN Combined Cycle Power Plant	Pillai Perumal Nallur	Nagapattinam district	Tamil Nadu	Southern	11°04′31″N 79°50′43″E	1 x 330.5	330.5		Private
Valantarvy Power Station	Valantarvy		Tamil Nadu	Southern		1 x 52.8	52.8	Pioneer Gas Power Ltd	Private
Karaikal Gas Turbine Power Station	Karaikal	Karaikal	Puducherry	Southern		1 x 22.9, 1 x 9.6	32.5	PPCL	State
Southern				20		61	9,106.77		
Maithan GT	Maithan		West Bengal	Eastern		1 x 90^{$}		DVC	State
Haldia GT	Haldia		West Bengal	Eastern		1 x 40	40		State
Kasba Peak Load Power Generating Station	Kasba	Kolkata	West Bengal	Eastern		2 x 20	40	CESC	Private
Eastern				3		4	170		
Lakwa Thermal Power Station	Maibella	Sivasagar	Assam	North Eastern	26°59′08″N 94°55′42″E	3 x 15^{$}, 3 x 20, 1 x 37.2 (WHRP)	97.2	APGCL	State
Namrup Thermal Power Station		Dibrugarh	Assam	North Eastern	27°11′11″N 95°22′34″E	1 x 20^{$}, 2 x 21, 1 x 11, 1 x 24, 1 x 14	91	APGCL	State
Khathalguri CCPP		Khathalguri	Assam	North Eastern		1 x 291	291	Neepco	State
Agartala GT	Agartala		Tripura	North Eastern		1 x 109.5	109.5	Neepco	State
Monarchak CCPP			Tripura	North Eastern		1 x 65.4	65.4	Neepco	State
ONGC Tripura Power Company CCPP	Palatana-Udaipur		Tripura	North Eastern	22°29′59″N 91°26′22″E	2 x 363.3	726.6	ONGC	Central
Rokia GT	Bhishalgarh	West Tripura	Tripura	North Eastern		1 x 111	111		State
Baramura GT	Baramura		Tripura	North Eastern		1 x 58.5	58.5		State
North Eastern				8		21	1629.3		
Total				65		206	28,096.49		

==== Diesel-based ====
The total installed capacity of major grid connected diesel-based power plants in India is 509.71 MW. The installed capacity of captive power DG sets is estimated to be nearly 90,000 MW. Here is the partial list of grid connected plants.

$ → Retired/scrapped power stations

Power station	Location	District	State	Region	Coordinates	Unit capacities	Capacity (MW)	Operator	Sector
Kozhikode Diesel Power Station	Kozhikode	Kozhikode	Kerala	Southern	11°12′19″N 75°48′25″E	2 x 16^{$}, 6 x 16.00	96	KSEB	State
Yelahanka Diesel Power Station	Yelahanka	Bangalore	Karnataka	Southern		6 x 21.32	127.92	KPCL	State
Belgaum Diesel Power Station	Yelahanka	Belgaum	Karnataka	Southern		5 x 16.26^{$}, 2 x 16.26	32.52		Private
Brahmapuram Diesel Power Plant	Brahmapuram		Kerala	Southern		2 x 21.32^{$}, 3 x 21.32	64	KSEB	State
LVS Power Station	Vishakhapatnam		Andhra Pradesh	Southern		1 x 36.8	36.8	Greenko	Private
Samalpatti Diesel Power Station	Samalpatti		Tamil Nadu	Southern			105.7		Private
Samayanallur Diesel Power Station	Samayanallur		Tamil Nadu	Southern			106		Private
Bellary Power Station	Bellary		Karnataka	Southern			25.2		Private
Southern				9		24	594.14		
Suryachakra Diesel Power Station	A & N		Andaman & Nicobar	Islands			20	SPCL	Private
Islands				1			20		
Bemina Diesel Power Station	Bemina	Srinagar	Jammu and Kashmir	Northern		1 x 5	5	J&K Govt	State
Leh Diesel Power Station	Leh	Leh	Ladakh	Northern		1 x 2.18	2.18	J&K Govt	State
Ambala Diesel Power Station	Ambala	Ambala	Haryana	Northern		1 x 2.18	2.18	Haryana Govt	State
Upper Sindh Diesel Power Station			Jammu and Kashmir	Northern		1 x 1.7	1.70	J&K Govt	State
Keylong Diesel Power Station	Keylong	Lahaul and Spiti	Himachal Pradesh	Northern		1 x 0.13	0.13	HP Govt	State
Kamah Diesel Power Station			Jammu and Kashmir	Northern		1 x 0.06	0.06	J&K Govt	State
Northern				6		6	11.25		
Gangtok Diesel Power Station	Gangtok	East Sikkim	Sikkim	Eastern			4	Sikkim Govt	State
Ranipool Diesel Power Station	Ranipool	East Sikkim	Sikkim	Eastern			1	Sikkim Govt	State
Eastern				2			5		
Leimakhong Diesel Power Station	Leimakhong		Manipur	North Eastern			36		State
North Eastern				1			36		
Total				19			666.39		

== Renewable ==
India was the first country in the world to set up a ministry of non-conventional energy resources, in the early 1980s. India's cumulative grid interactive, or grid tied, renewable energy capacity (excluding large hydro) had reached about 87.38 GW as of 2020.

=== Hydroelectric ===
This is a list of major hydroelectric power plants in India.

^{#} Hydro power units with pumped storage features

Station	District	State	Region	Plant coordinates	Unit capacities	Capacity (MW)	Under construction (MW)	Operator
AD Hydro Power Ltd.	Kullu	Himachal Pradesh	Northern		2 x 96	192	-	ADHPL
Tehri Dam	Tehri Garhwal	Uttarakhand	Northern	30°22′40″N 78°28′50″E	4 x 250, 4 x 250^{#}	1,000	1000^{#}	THDC
Koteshwar Dam		Uttarakhand	Northern	30°22′40″N 78°28′50″E	4 x 100	400		THDC
Baspa-II		Himachal Pradesh	Northern		3 x 100	300	-	JHPL
Karcham Wangtoo Hydroelectric Plant	Kinnaur	Himachal Pradesh	Northern	31°32′35.53″N 78°00′54.80″E	4 x 250	1,000	-	JHPL
Nathpa Jhakri		Himachal Pradesh	Northern	31°33′50″N 77°58′49″E	6 x 250	1,500	-	SJVNL
Dehar Power House	Mandi	Himachal Pradesh	Northern	31°24′47″N 76°52′06″E	6 x 165	990	-	BBMB
Pong		Himachal Pradesh	Northern	31°58′17″N 75°56′48″E	6 x 66	396	-	BBMB
Bhakra Dam		Himachal Pradesh	Northern	31°24′39″N 76°26′0″E	2 x 108, 3 x 126, 5 x 157	1,379	-	BBMB
Chamera Dam	Chamba	Himachal Pradesh	Northern	32°35′50″N 75°59′09″E	3 x 180, 3 x 100, 3 x 77	1,071	-	NHPC
Salal Hydroelectric Power Station	Reasi	Jammu and Kashmir	Northern	33°8′26″N 74°48′27″E	6 x 115	690	-	NHPC
Uri Hydroelectric Project	Baramulla	Jammu and Kashmir	Northern	34°08′40″N 74°11′08″E	4 x 120, 4 x 60	480	240	NHPC
Dulhasti	Kishtwar	Jammu and Kashmir	Northern		3 x 130	390	-	NHPC
Dhauliganga-I	Pithoragarh	Uttarakhand	Northern	29°58′N 80°37′E	4 x 70	280	-	NHPC
Baira Suil	Chamba	Himachal Pradesh	Northern		3 x 60	180	-	NHPC
Tanakpur	Champawat	Uttarakhand	Northern	27°21′N 81°23′E	3 x 40	120	-	NHPC
Sewa	Kathua	Jammu and Kashmir	Northern		3 x 40	120	-	NHPC
Nimmo-Bazgo	Leh	Ladakh	Northern		3 x 15	45	-	NHPC
Chutak	Kargil	Ladakh	Northern		4 x 11	44	-	NHPC
Parbati Hydroelectric Project	Kullu	Himachal Pradesh	Northern		4 x 200, 4 x 130	-	1,320	NHPC
Kishanganga Hydroelectric Project	Baramulla	Jammu and Kashmir	Northern	34°38′51″N 74°45′53″E	3 x 110	330		NHPC
Rana Pratap sagar Dam	Rawatbhata	Rajasthan	Northern		4 x 43	172	-	RRPGCL
Jawahar Sagar Dam	Kota	Rajasthan	Northern		3 x 33	99	-	RRPGCL
Northern			19		106	11,261	2,560	
Srisailam Dam		Andhra Pradesh, Telangana	Southern	16°05′13″N 78°53′50″E	6 x 150^{#}, 7 x 110	1,670	-	APGenco, TSGENCO
Sharavathi		Karnataka	Southern	14°14′06″N 74°46′02″E	10 x 103.5, 2 x 27.5, 4 x 60, 4 x 13.2, 4 x 21.6	1,608.2	-	KPCL
Kalinadi		Karnataka	Southern	14°50′32″N 74°07′23″E	2 x 50, 1 x 135, 5 x 150, 3 x 50, 3 x 40	1,240	-	KPCL
Varahi		Karnataka	Southern	13°42′09″N 74°59′56″E	4 x 115, 2 x 4.5, 5 x 7.5	506.5	-	KPCL
Nagarjuna Sagar		Telangana	Southern	16°36′N 79°20′E	1 x 110, 7 x 100.8^{#}, 2 x 30	875	-	TSGENCO
Nagarjuna Sagar Right Bank PH		Andhra Pradesh	Southern	16°36′N 79°20′E	3 x 30	90	-	APGenco
Nagarjuna Sagar tail pond PH		Andhra Pradesh	Southern	16°37′N 79°29′E	2 x 25	50		APGenco
Idukki		Kerala	Southern	9°51′01″N 76°58′01″E	6 x 130	780	-	KSEB
Mettur Dam		Tamil Nadu	Southern	11°48′00″N 77°48′00″E	4 x 50	240	-	TNEB
Lower Mettur Barrage		Tamil Nadu	Southern		8 x 15	120	-	TNEB
Bhavani Kattalai Barrage		Tamil Nadu	Southern		4 x 15	60	-	TNEB
Linganamakki Dam		Karnataka	Southern	17°7′18″N 74°53′31″E		55	-	
Kadamparai pumped storage	Coimbatore	Tamil Nadu	Southern	10°24′15″N 77°02′37″E	4 x 100^{#}	400	-	TNEB
Aliyar PH	Aliyar	Tamil Nadu	Southern		1 x 60	60	-	TNEB
Kundah	Nilgiris	Tamil Nadu	Southern		1 x 60, 1 x 180, 1 x 175, 1 x 100, 1 x 40, 1 x 30	585	-	TNEB
Pykara PH	Nilgiris	Tamil Nadu	Southern			59.2	-	TNEB
Pykara Ultimate Stage PH	Nilgiris	Tamil Nadu	Southern		3 x 50	150	-	TNEB
Sholayar	Kanyakumari	Tamil Nadu	Southern		1 x 70, 1 x 25	95	-	TNEB
Periyar PH	Theni	Tamil Nadu	Southern		2 x 35, 2 x 42	154	-	TNEB
Jurala Project	Chintharevula	Telangana	Southern	16°20′N 77°42′E	4 x 39	234	-	TSGENCO
Lower Jurala Hydro Electric Project	Atmakur	Telangana	Southern	16°19′N 77°47′E	6 x 40	240	-	TSGENCO
Pulichinthala Project		Telangana	Southern	16°45′N 80°03′E	4 x 30	120		TSGENCO
Upper Sileru		Andhra Pradesh	Southern	18°02′11″N 82°01′09″E	4 x 60	240	-	APGenco
Lower Sileru		Andhra Pradesh	Southern	17°52′11″N 81°39′27″E	4 x 115	460	-	APGenco
Donkarayi		Andhra Pradesh	Southern	17°55′57″N 81°47′49″E	1 x 25	25	-	APGenco
Polavaram		Andhra Pradesh	Southern	17°15′40″N 81°39′23″E	12 x 80	-	960	APGenco
Southern			24		153	9,610.4	960	
Koyna	Satara	Maharashtra	Western	17°24′06″N 73°45′08″E	4 x 70, 4 x 80, 2 x 20, 4 x 80, 4 x 250, 2 x 40^{#}	1,960	80^{#}	MSPGCL (MAHAGENCO)
Sardar Sarovar Dam		Gujarat	Western	21°49′49″N 73°44′50″E	6 x 200^{#}, 5 x 50	1,450	-	Sardar Sarovar Narmada Nigam
Indira Sagar	Khadwa	Madhya Pradesh	Western	22°17′02″N 76°28′17″E	8 x 125	1,000	-	NHPC
Omkareshwar	Khandwa	Madhya Pradesh	Western	22°05′N 74°54′E	8 x 65	520	-	NHPC
Bansagar Dam		Madhya Pradesh	Western	24°11′30″N 81°17′15″E		425	-	
Ukai Dam		Gujarat	Western		4 x 75	300	-	GSECL
Ghatghar Pumped Storage		Maharashtra	Western	19°32′33″N 73°39′53″E	2 x 125^{#}	250	-	MSPGCL (MAHAGENCO)
Mulshi Dam	Pune	Maharashtra	Western	18°31′37″N 73°30′39″E	6 x 25, 1 x 150^{#}	300	-	Tata Power
Bargi Dam		Madhya Pradesh	Western	22°56′30″N 79°55′30″E		105	-	
Madikheda Dam		Madhya Pradesh	Western	25°33′20″N 77°51′10″E		60	-	
Jayakwadi Dam		Maharashtra	Western	19°29′8.7″N 075°22′12″E	1 X 12^{#}	12	-	
Kadana Dam		Gujarat	Western		2 x 60^{#}, 2 x 60	240	-	GSECL
Ujjani Dam	Solapur	Maharashtra	Western	18°04′27″N 75°07′13″E	1 x 12^{#}	12	-	MSPGCL (MAHAGENCO)
Gandhisagar Dam		Madhya Pradesh	Western	24°42′24″N 75°33′12″E	5 x 23	115	-	MPPGCL
Western			10		55	5,932	80	
Upper Indravati Power Station	Kalahandi	Odisha	Eastern	19°28′20″N 82°59′50″E	4 x 150	600	-	Odisha Hydro Power Corporation
Balimela Power Station	Malkangiri	Odisha & Andhra Pradesh	Eastern	18°08′49″N 82°06′55″E	6 x 60, 2 x 75	510	60	Odisha Hydro Power Corporation
Hirakud Dam	Sambalpur	Odisha	Eastern	21°32′58″N 83°52′12″E	2 x 49.5, 2 x 32, 3 x 37.5, 3 x 24	347.5	-	Odisha Hydro Power Corporation
Upper Kolab Power Station	Koraput	Odisha	Eastern	18°47′19″N 82°36′00″E	4 x 80	320	-	Odisha Hydro Power Corporation
Sindol Complex Power Station	Sambalpur	Odisha	Eastern	21°32′58″N 83°49′31″E	5 x 18, 5 x 20, 6 x 20	320	-	Odisha Hydro Power Corporation
Potteru Hydro Electric Project	Koraput	Odisha	Eastern	17°57′31″N 81°41′08″E	2 x 3	6	-	Odisha Hydro Power Corporation
Jalaput Dam	Koraput	Odisha & Andhra Pradesh	Eastern	18°27′17″N 82°32′47″E	3 x 23, 3 x 17	120	-	Odisha Hydro Power Corporation
Rengali Dam	Angul	Odisha	Eastern	21°16′36″N 82°32′54″E	5 x 50	250	-	Odisha Hydro Power Corporation
Teesta-III	North Sikkim	Sikkim	Eastern		6 x 200	1,200		Teesta Urja Ltd
Teesta-V	East Sikkim	Sikkim	Eastern	25°30′50″N 89°39′56″E	3 x 170	510	-	NHPC
Teesta Low Dam	Darjeeling	West Bengal	Eastern		4 x 33, 4 x 40	132	160	NHPC
Purulia pumped storage	Purulia	West Bengal	Eastern		4 x 225^{#}	900		WBSEB
Panchet	Purulia	West Bengal	Eastern		1 x 40, 1 x 40^{#}	80	-	DVC
Maithon Hydel Power Station		West Bengal &Jharkhand	Eastern		3 x 20^{#}	60	-	DVC
Rangit	South Sikkim	Sikkim	Eastern		3 x 20	60	-	NHPC
Chuzachen Hydroelectric Power Plant	East Sikkim	Sikkim	Eastern		2 x 55	110	-	GIPL
Eastern			16		60	3,274.5	160	
Kambang Project		Arunachal Pradesh	North East		3 x 2	6	-	NHPC
Sippi Project		Arunachal Pradesh	North East		2 x 2	4	-	NHPC
Ranganadi		Arunachal Pradesh	North East	27°15′27″N 93°47′32″E	3 x 135	405	-	Neepco
Lower Subansiri Hydroelectric Power Project	Lower Subansiri	Arunachal Pradesh	North East	27°33′13″N 94°15′31″E	8 x 250	-	2,000	NHPC
Khuga Dam		Manipur	North East	24°18′N 93°9′E			-	
Loktak		Manipur	North East	24°33′N 93°47′E	3 x 35	105	-	NHPC
Umiam-Umtru Hydroelectric Power Project	East Khasi Hills	Meghalaya	North East	25.6532°N 91.8843°E	6 x 9, 4 x 30	185	-	MECL
Leshka		Meghalaya	North East			126	-	
Kyrdemkulai		Meghalaya	North East			60	-	
Khondong		Meghalaya	North East			50	-	
Kopili		Assam	North East			225	-	
Karbi Langpi		Assam	North East			100	-	
Doyang		Nagaland	North East			75	-	
North East			13		26	1341	2,000	
Total			82		400	30,908.9	4,050	

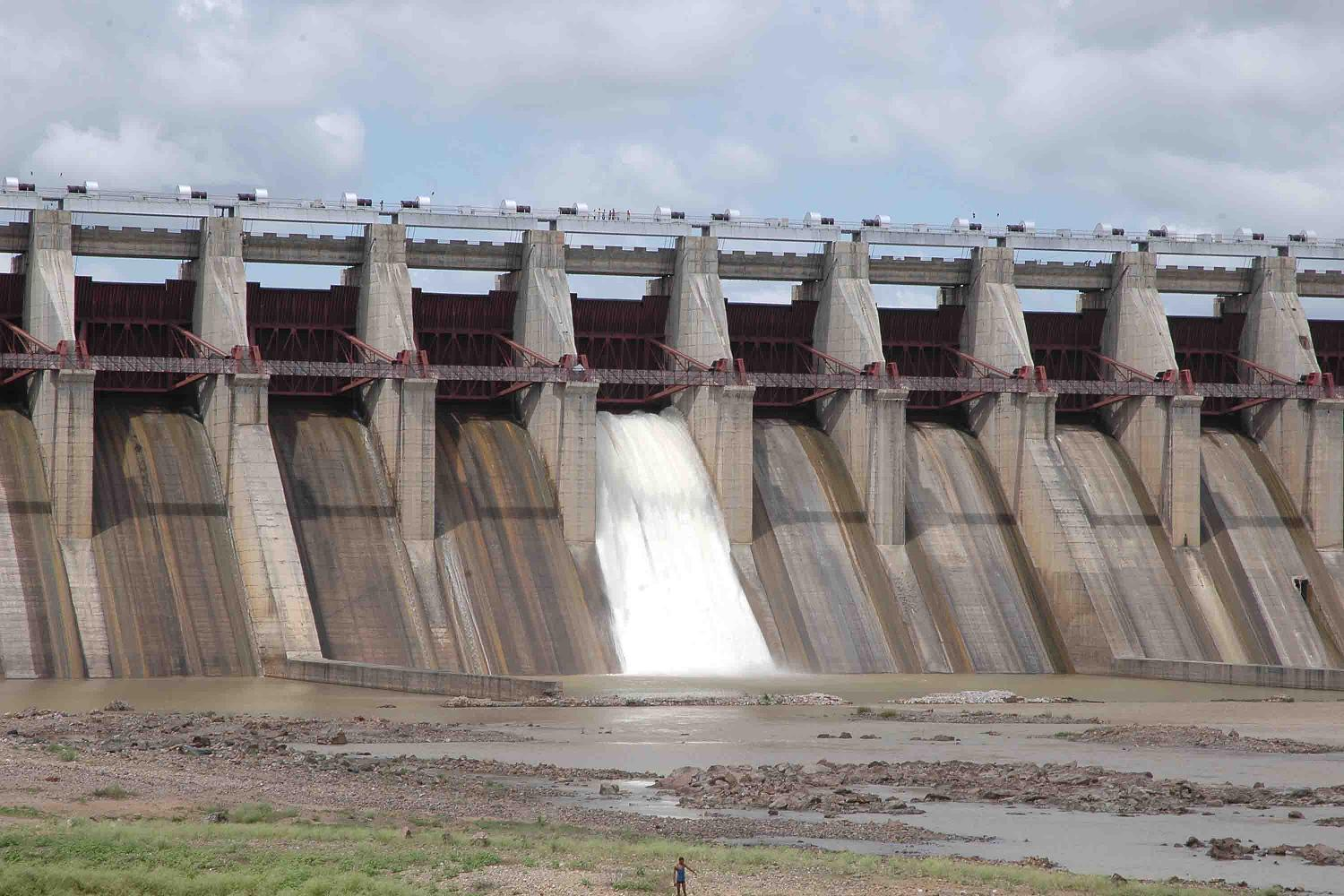
Bansagar Dam

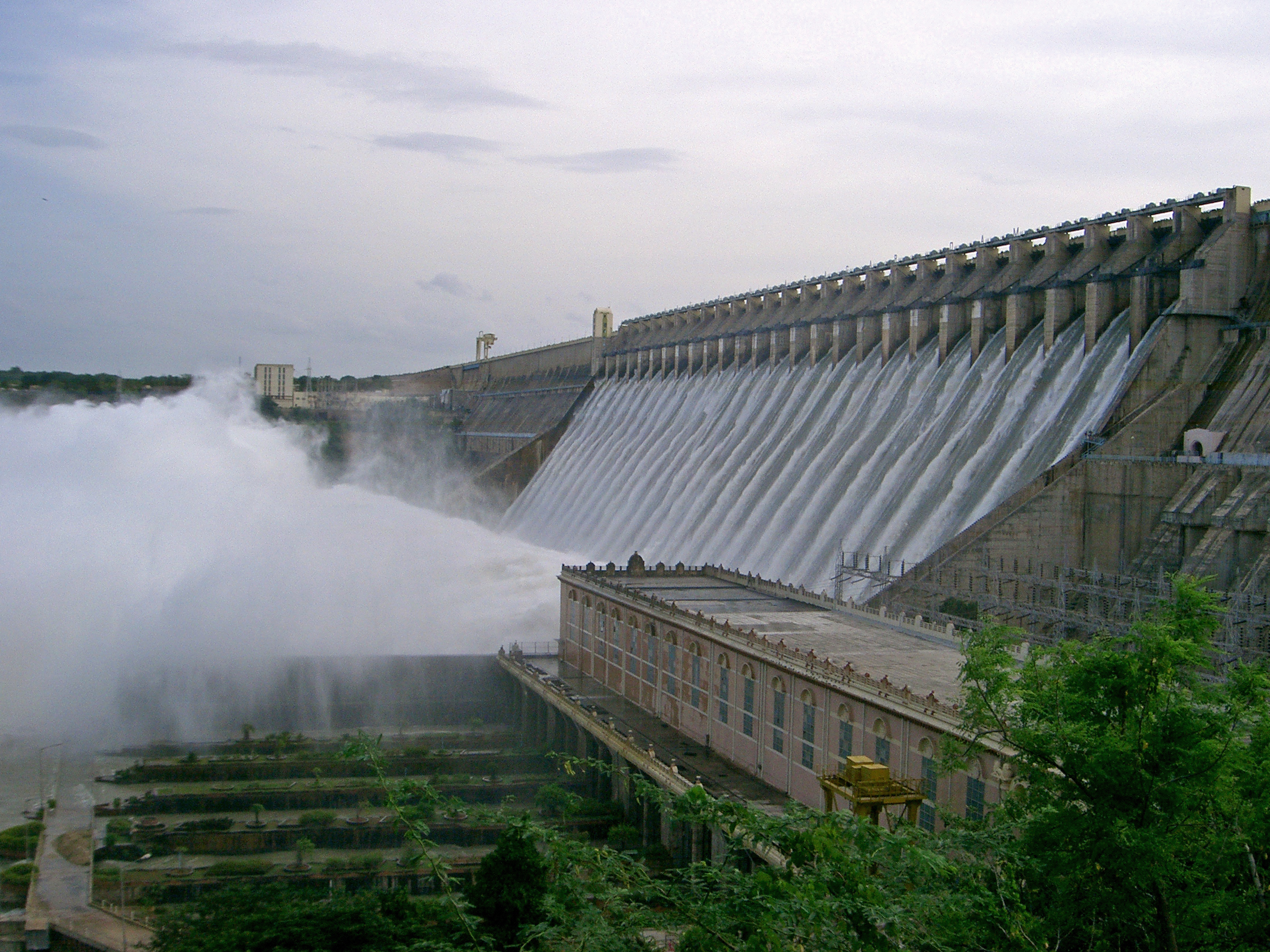
Nagarjuna Sagar Dam across Krishna River

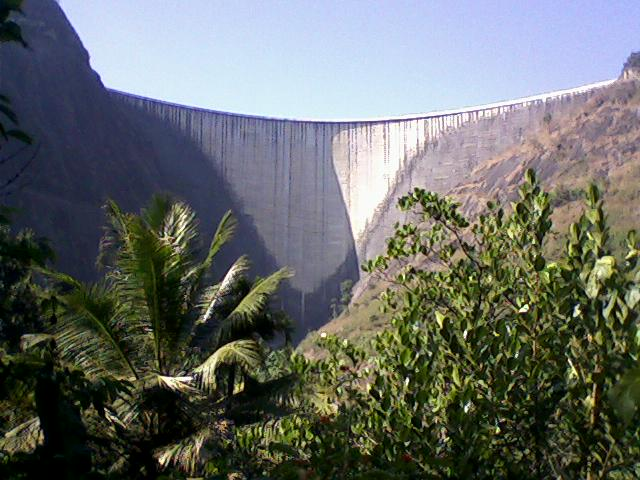
Idukki arch dam on Periyar River

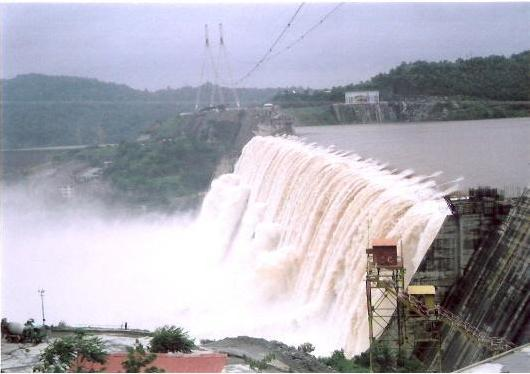
Sardar Sarovar Dam on Narmada River

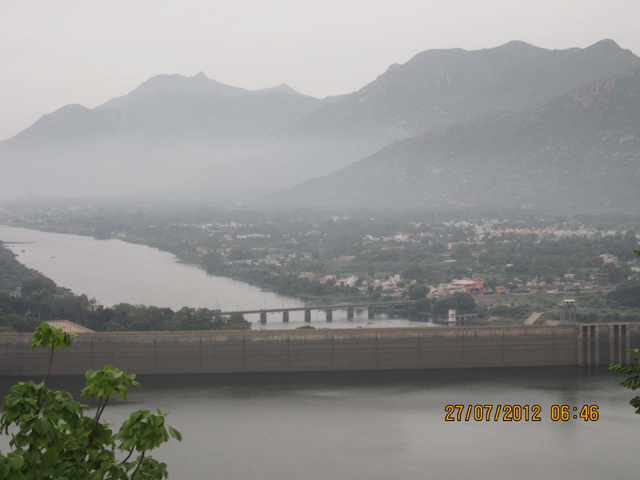
Mettur Dam Stanley Reservoir on Kaveri River

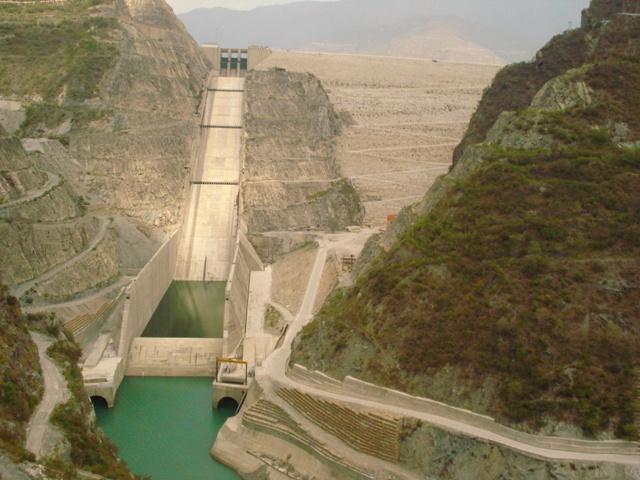
Spillway of Tehri Dam

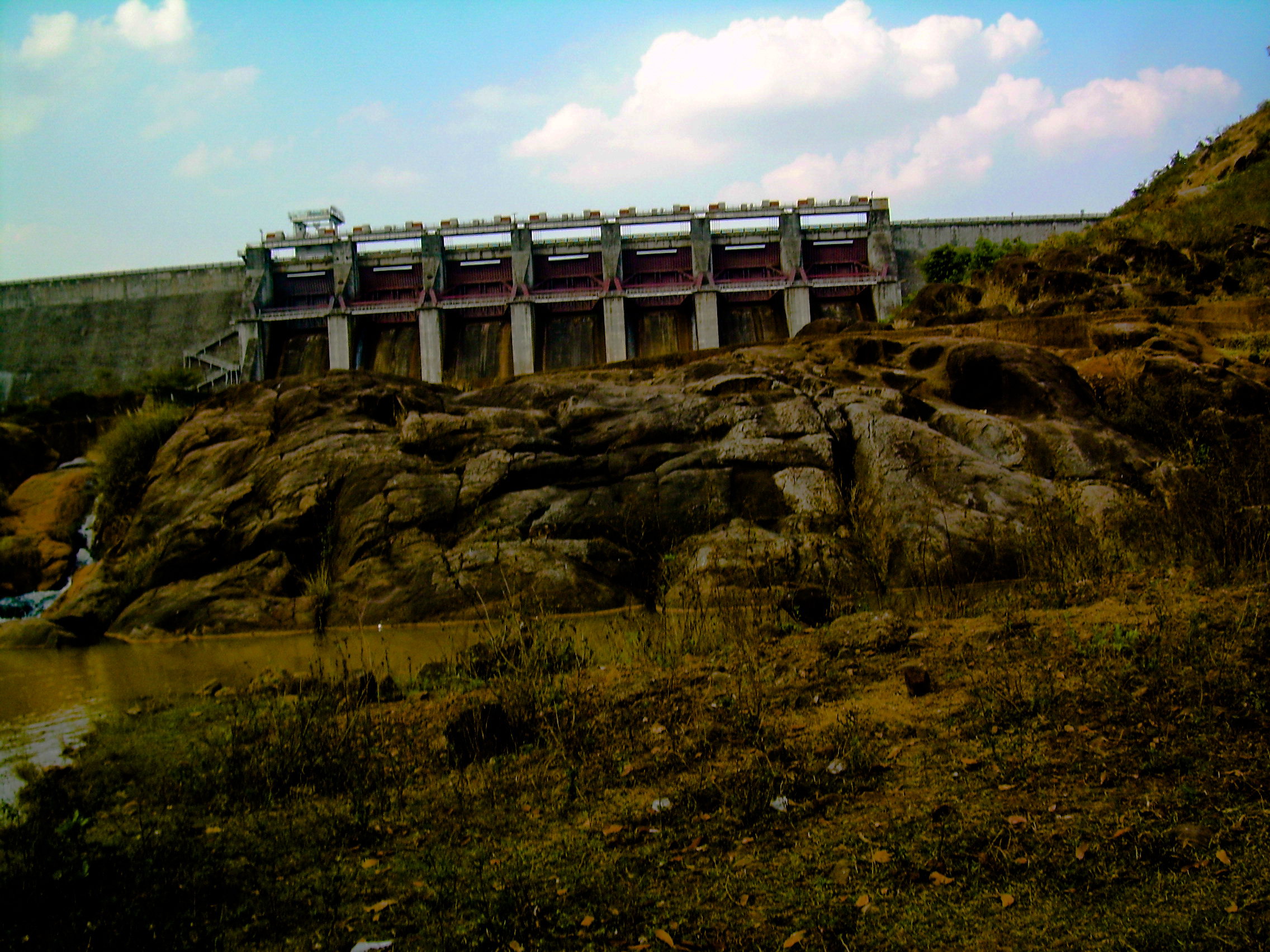
Upper Indravati power house

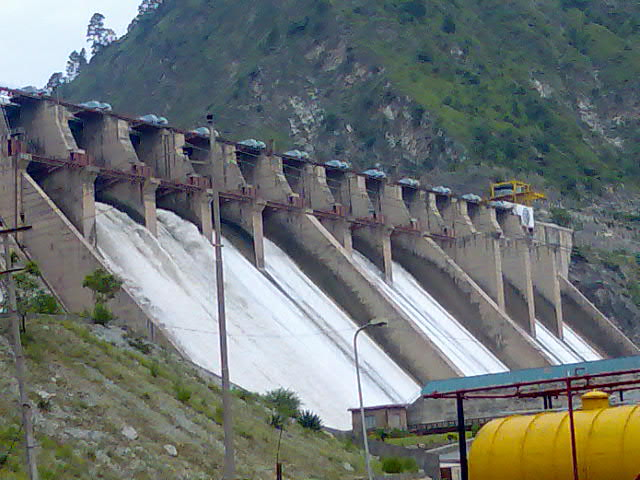
Spil way of Salal HE Station

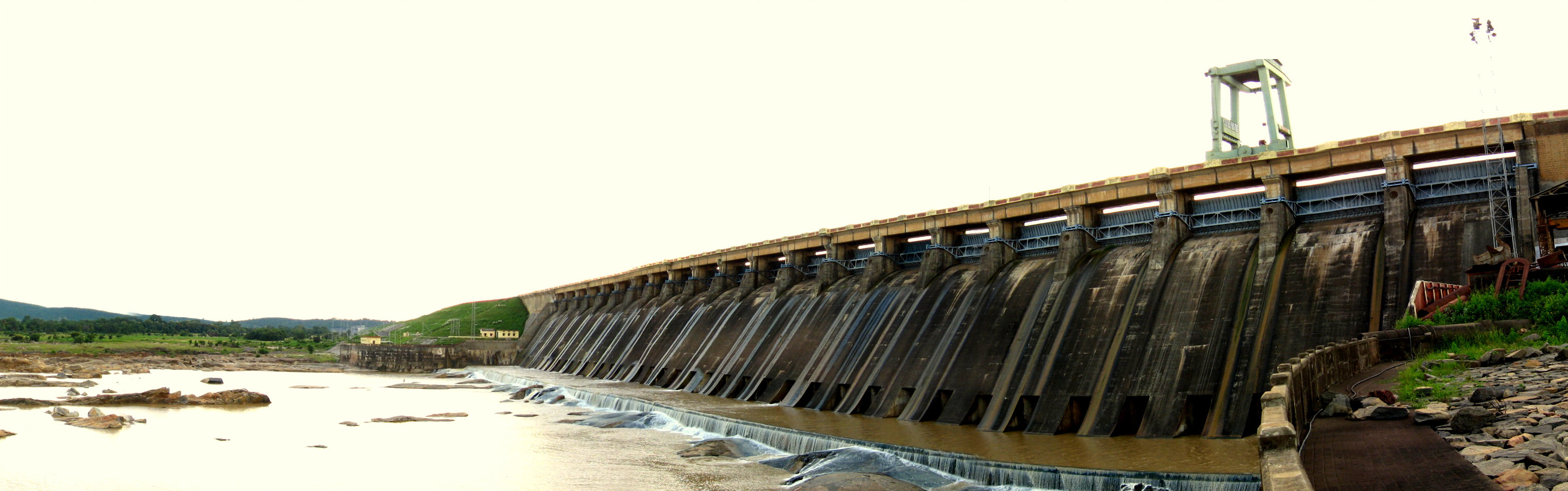
Panoramic view of Hirakud Dam at Sambalpur

=== Solar photovoltaic ===
Below is a list of solar power generation facilities with a capacity of at least 20 MW.

Major photovoltaic (PV) power plants
Plant	State	Coordinates	DC peak power (MW)	Year comm- issioned	Notes	Ref
Adani Green Solar Park	Gujarat	24°10′04.41″N 69°34′09.79″E	2,250	2024		
Bhadla Solar Park	Rajasthan	27°32′22.81″N 71°54′54.91″E	2,245	2020	World's biggest solar park in terms of generation and second largest in terms of area as of March 2020	
Pavagada Solar Park	Karnataka	14°15′7″N 77°26′51″E	2,050	2019	Second biggest solar park in the world and world's largest in terms of area as in March 2020	
Kurnool Ultra Mega Solar Park	Andhra Pradesh	15.681522°N 78.283749°E	1,000	2017		
NP Kunta	Andhra Pradesh	14°01′N 78°26′E	978	2021	In Nambulapulakunta Mandal. Total planned capacity 1500 MW	
Rewa Ultra Mega Solar	Madhya Pradesh	24°28′49″N 81°34′28″E	750	2018		
Charanka Solar Park	Gujarat	23°54′N 71°12′E	690	2012	Situated at Charanka village in Patan district. Capacity expected to go up to 790 MW in 2019.	
Kamuthi Solar Power Project	Tamil Nadu		648	2017	With a generating capacity of 648 MW_{p} at a single location, it is the world's 12th largest solar park based on capacity.	
Gujarat solar park 1	Gujarat		221	2012		
Ananthapuramu – II	Andhra Pradesh	14°58′49″N 78°02′45″E	400	2019	Located at Talaricheruvu village in Tadipatri mandal of Anantapur district. Planned capacity 500 MW	
Galiveedu solar park	Andhra Pradesh	14°6′21″N 78°27′57″E	400	2020	Located at Marrikommadinne village in Galiveedu mandal of kadapa district.	
Mandsaur Solar Farm	Madhya Pradesh	24°5′17″N 75°47′59″E	250	2017		
Kadapa Ultra Mega Solar Park	Andhra Pradesh	14°54′59″N 78°17′31″E	250	2020	Total planned capacity 1000 MW	
Welspun Solar MP project	Madhya Pradesh		151	2014		
ReNew Power, Nizamabad	Telangana		143	2017		
Neyveli Solar Power Project	Tamil Nadu		130	2018	The project is spread over 4 locations within the town.	
Sakri solar plant	Maharashtra		125	2013		
NTPC solar plants NTPC Bhadla Solar Power Plant			110	2015		
Maharashtra I	Maharashtra		67	2017		
Green Energy Development Corporation (GEDCOL)	Odisha		50	2014		
Tata Power Solar (TPS), Rajgarh	Madhya Pradesh		50	2014		
Welspun Energy, Phalodhi	Rajasthan		50	2013		
Jalaun Solar Power Project	Uttar Pradesh		50	2016		
GEDCOL	Odisha		48	2014		
CIAL Solar Power Project	Kerala		40	2013	Powering first fully solar powered airport in the world	
Karnataka I	Karnataka		40	2018		
Bitta Solar Power Plant	Gujarat		40	2012		
Dhirubhai Ambani Solar Park, Pokhran	Rajasthan		40	2012		
Vikram Solar and IL&FS Energy Development Co Ltd	Madhya Pradesh		40	2015		
Rajasthan Photovoltaic Plant	Rajasthan		35	2013		
Welspun, Bathinda	Punjab		34	2015		
Moser Baer, Patan district	Gujarat		30	2011		
Lalitpur Solar Power Project	Uttar Pradesh		30	2015		
Mithapur Solar Power Plant	Gujarat		25	2012		
Vankal Solar Park	Mizoram		20	2023		
GEDCOL	Odisha		20	2014		

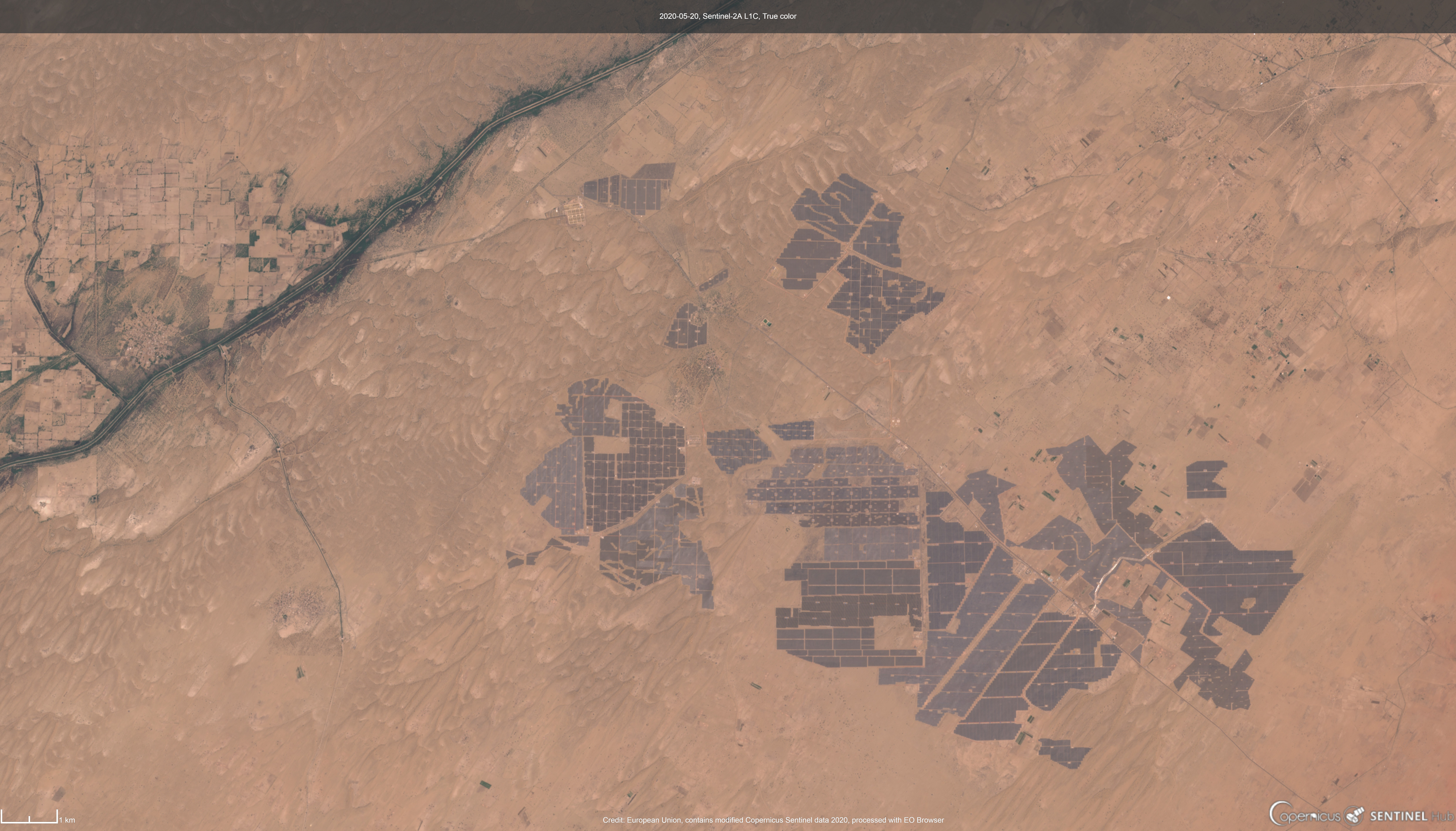
Bhadla Solar Park, Rajasthan 2,245 MW 27°32′22.81″N 71°54′54.91″E

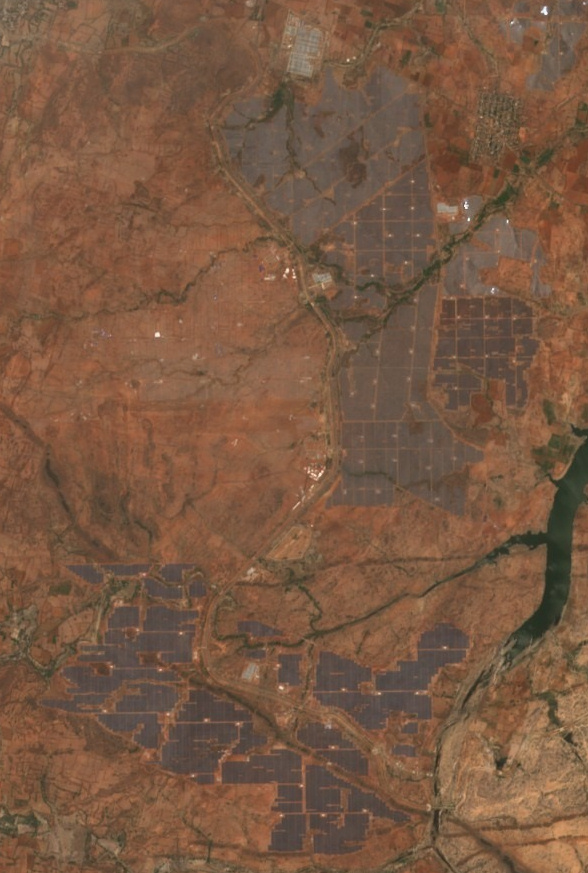
NP Kunta Ultra Mega Solar Park, Andhra Pradesh 978 MW 14°01′N 78°26′E

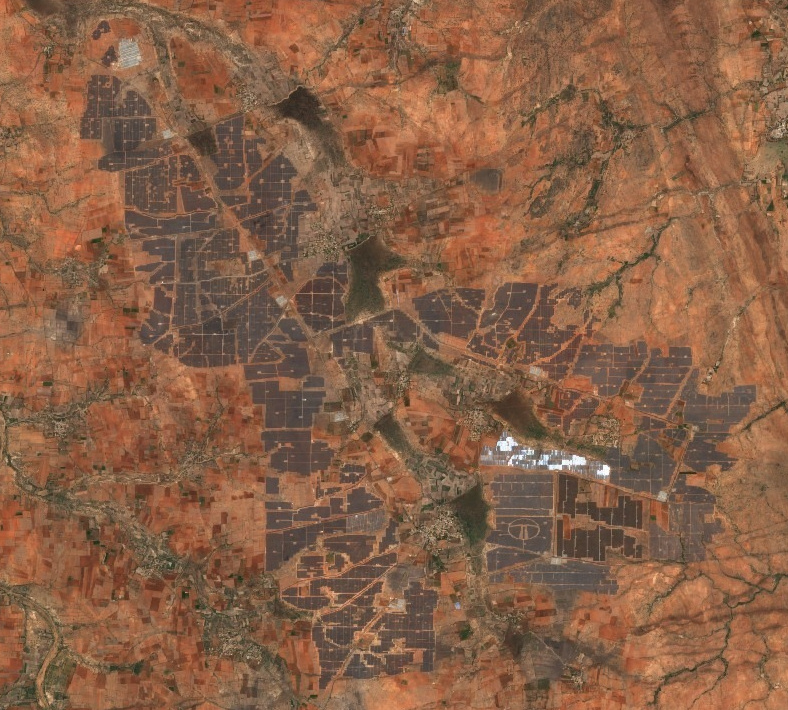
Pavagada Solar Park, Karnataka 2,050 MW 14°15′7″N 77°26′51″E

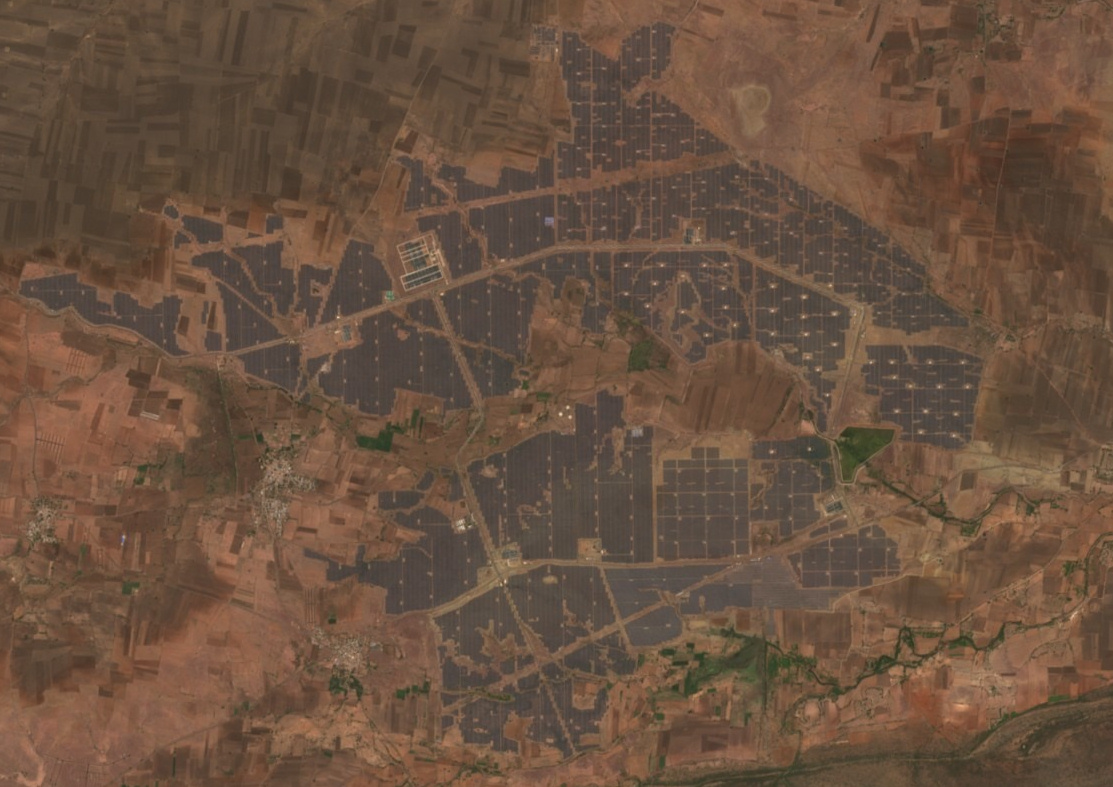
Kurnool Ultra Mega Solar Park, Andhra Pradesh 1,000 MW 15.681522°N 78.283749°E

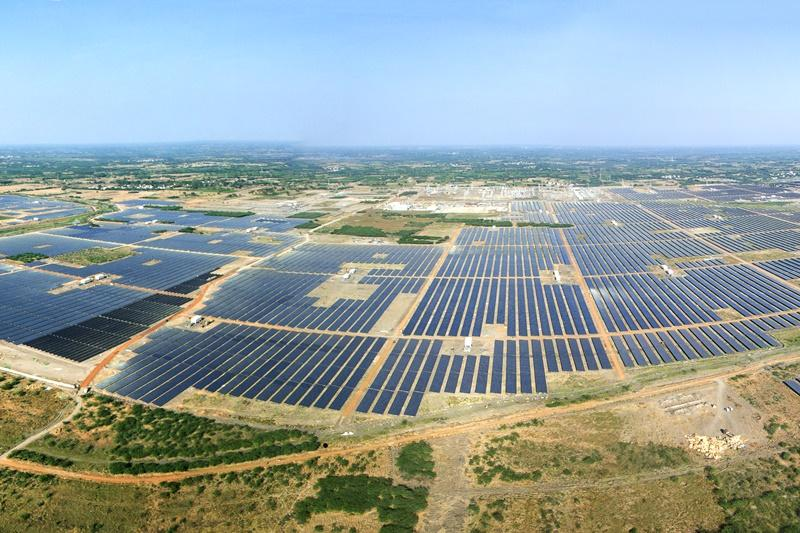
Kamuthi Solar Power Project, Tamil Nadu 648 MW

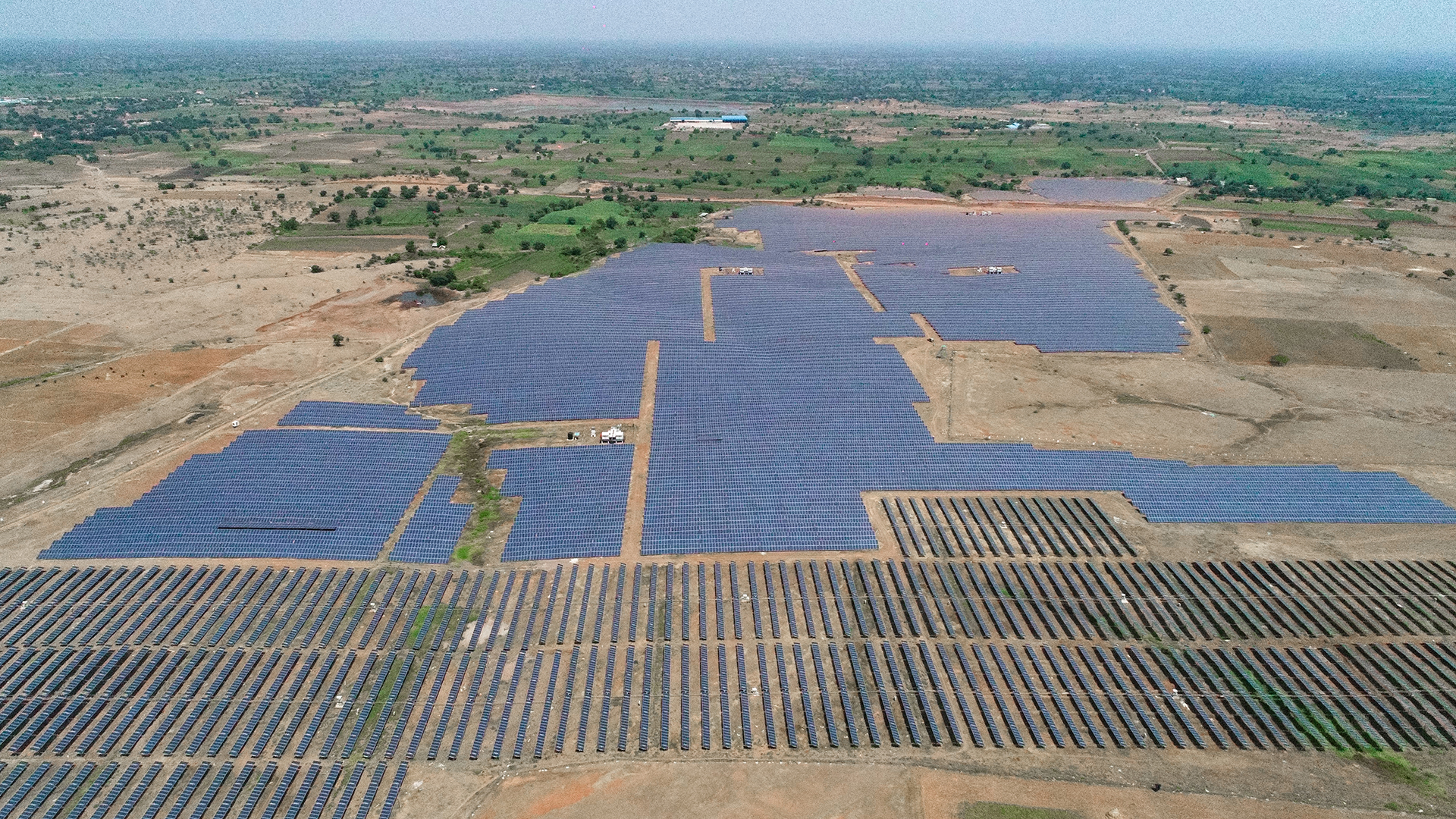
Maharashtra I Solar Power Plant, Maharashtra 67 MW

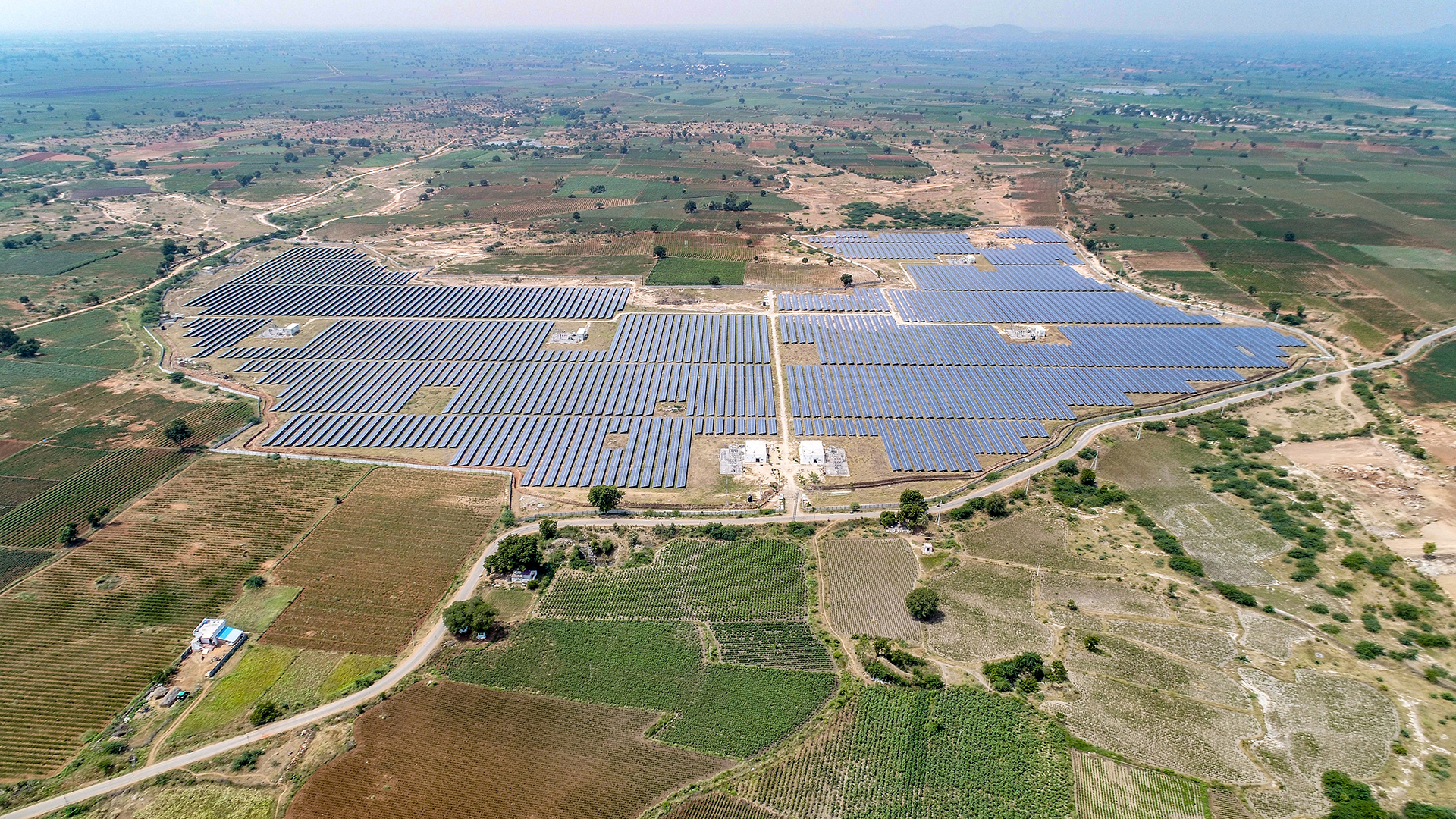
Telangana I Solar Power Plant, Telangana 12 MW

=== Solar thermal ===
Listed are concentrated solar power stations with a capacity of at least 10 MW.

Name	Location	State	Coordinates	Capacity (MW)	Commissioned	Ref
Dhursar Solar Plant	Jaisalmer district	Rajasthan	26°47′09″N 72°00′30″E	125	2016	

=== Wind power ===
India's largest wind power production facilities (20 MW and greater) include:

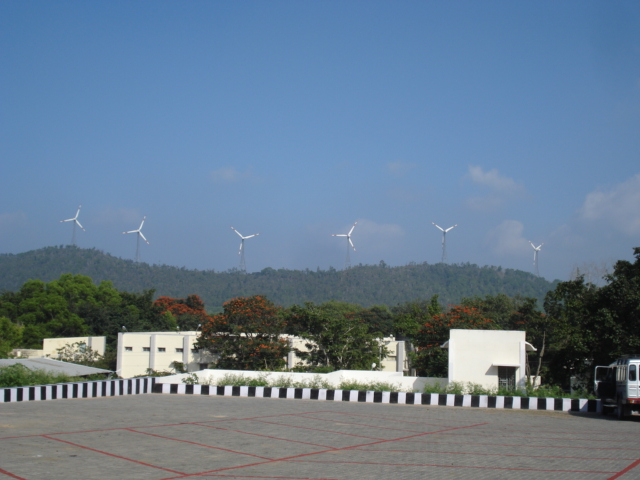
Windmills on the Tirumala hills in Andhra Pradesh

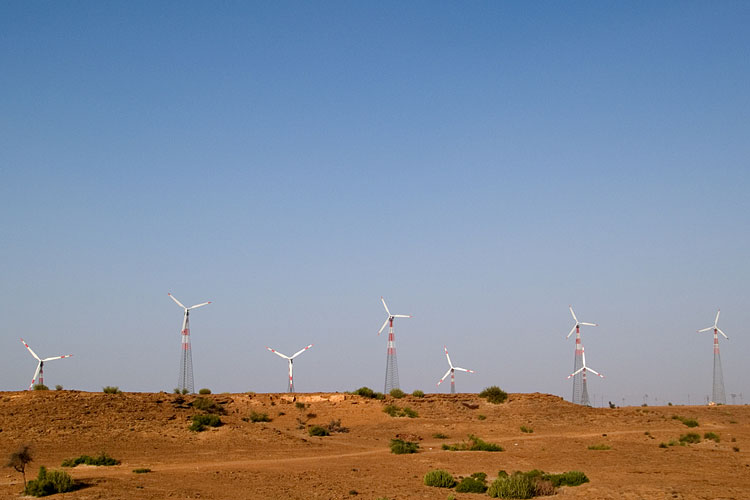
A wind farm in Rajasthan

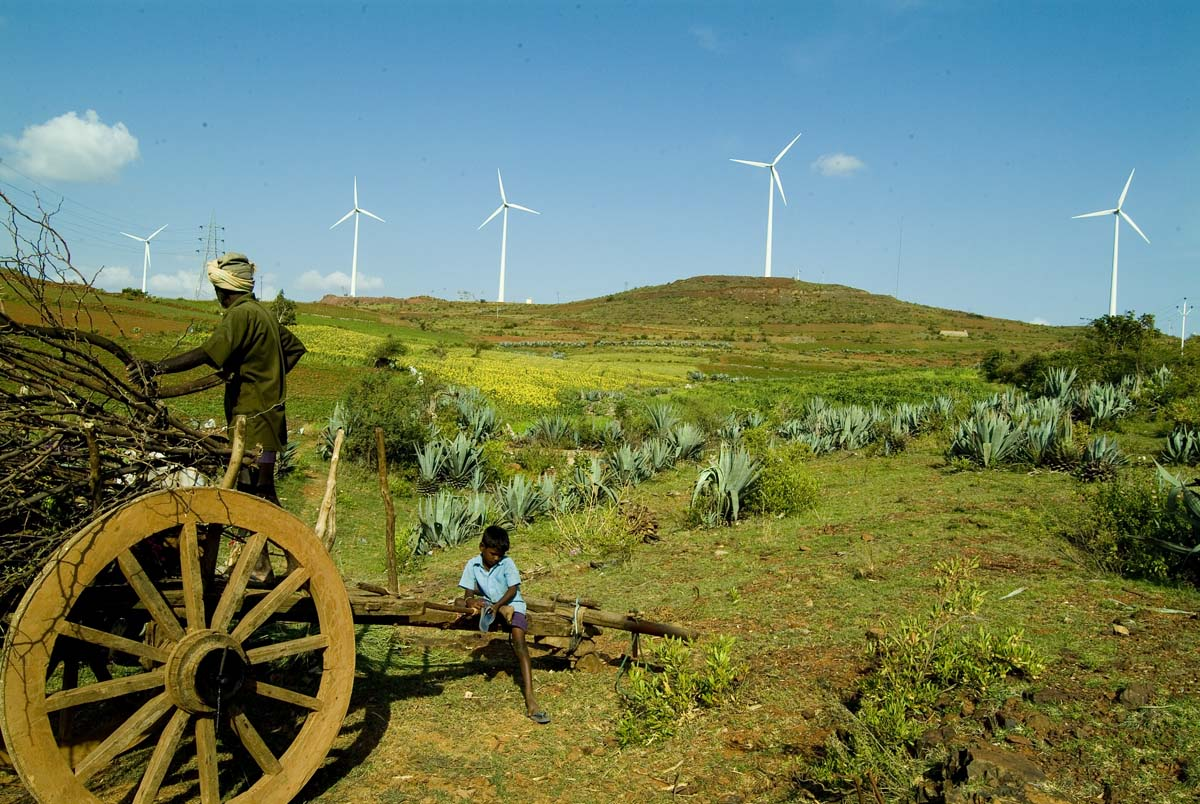
Wind turbines in India's agricultural farms

Power plant	Location	State	MWe	Producer	Ref
Kutch Wind Farm (Gujarat Hybrid Renewable Energy Park)	Kutch	Gujarat	11,500 (wind) + 11,500 (solar + wind)	Adani Group Suzlon	
Muppandal Wind Farm	Kanyakumari	Tamil Nadu	1500	Muppandal Wind	
Jaisalmer Wind Park	Jaisalmer	Rajasthan	1064	Suzlon Energy	
Brahmanvel windfarm	Dhule	Maharashtra	528	Parakh Agro Industries	
Sidhpur-2	Dwarka	Gujarat	250.8	KP Energy	
Kayathar	Thoothukudi	Tamilnadu	300	Siemens Gamesa, ReNew Power	
Dhalgaon windfarm	Sangli	Maharashtra	278	Gadre Marine Exports	
Vankusawade Wind Park	Satara district	Maharashtra	259	Suzlon Energy Ltd.	
Vaspet	Vaspet	Maharashtra	144	ReNew Power	
Tuljapur	Osmanabad	Maharashtra	126	Siemens Gamesa, ReNew Power	
Sipla	Jaisalmer	Rajasthan	102	CLP Wind Farms (India) Private Ltd	
Saeame	Jamnagar	Gujarat	101	CLP Wind Farms (India) Private Ltd	
Beluguppa Wind Park	Beluguppa	Andhra Pradesh	100.8	Orange Renewable	
Mamatkheda Wind Park	Mamatkheda	Madhya Pradesh	100.5	Orange Renewable	
Anantapur Wind Park	Nimbagallu	Andhra Pradesh	100	Orange Renewable	
Damanjodi Wind Power Plant	Damanjodi	Odisha	99	Suzlon Energy Ltd	
Theni		Tamil Nadu	99	CLP Wind Farms (India) Private Ltd	
Saundatti	Belgaum	Karnataka	84	CLP Wind Farms (India) Private Ltd	
Jath	Jath	Maharashtra	84	ReNew Power	
Welturi	Welturi	Maharashtra	75	ReNew Power	
Kuchhdi	Porbandar	Gujarat	69	KP Energy	
Mahuva-1	Mahuva	Gujarat	67.8	KP Energy	
Acciona Tuppadahalli	Chitradurga District	Karnataka	56.1	Tuppadahalli Energy India Pvt Ltd	
Dangiri Wind Farm	Jaiselmer	Rajasthan	54	Oil India	
Nuziveedu Seeds	Bhimasamudra	Karnataka	50.4	NSL Renewable Power Pvt Ltd	
Bhungar	Mahuva	Gujarat	50 (wind) + 35 (solar)	KP Energy	
Khandke	Ahmednagar	Maharashtra	50	CLP Wind Farms (India) Private Ltd	
Narmada	Nallakonda	Andhra Pradesh	50	CLP Wind Farms (India) Private Ltd	
Bercha Wind Park	Ratlam	Madhya Pradesh	50	Orange Renewable	
Harapanahalli	Davanagere	Karnataka	40	CLP Wind Farms (India) Private Ltd	
Matalpar	Mahuva	Gujarat	33.6	KP Energy	
Ratadi	Porbandar	Gujarat	33.6	KP Energy	
Cape Comorin	Kanyakumari	Tamil Nadu	33	Aban Offshore	
Kayathar Subhash	Kayathar	Tamil Nadu	30	Subhash Ltd	
Dedan	Rajula	Gujarat	30	IB Vogt Solar India Pvt Ltd	
Vagra	Bharuch	Gujarat	25.8	KP Energy	
Fulsar	Mahuva	Gujarat	23.1	KP Energy	
Jasdan	Jasdan	Gujarat	25.0	NTPC Limited	
Ramakkalmedu	Ramakkalmedu	Kerala	25	Subhash Ltd	
Gudimangalam	Gudimangalam	Tamil Nadu	21	Gudimangalam Wind Farm	
Shalivahana Wind	Tirupur	Tamil Nadu	20.4	Shalivahana Green Energy Ltd	
Puthlur RCI	Puthlur	Andhra Pradesh	20	Wescare (India) Ltd	
Kora	Bharuch	Gujarat	13	KPI Green Energy	

== See also ==
- Energy policy of India
- Electricity in India
- States of India by installed power capacity
- List of largest power stations in the world
