= Vedanta Jharsuguda Captive Power Plant =

Coal based thermal captive power plant in India

Coordinates: 21.816752°N 84.041825°E

Vedanta Jharsuguda Power Station is a coal based thermal captive power plant located near Jharsuguda town in Jharsuguda district in the Indian state of Odisha. The power plant was commissioned in July 2008, and is operated by Vedanta Resources. It supplies power to aluminum smelter of Vedanta Resources.

The coal for the plant is sourced from Ib Valley Coalfield. Water is sourced from reservoir of Hirakud Dam. The Engineering, procurement and construction contract is given to SEPCO3 of People's Republic of China.

== Capacity ==
The plant's installed capacity is 1,215 MW being 9x135 MW units.
