= Neyveli Thermal Power Station =

Building in India

Neyveli Thermal Power Station-I
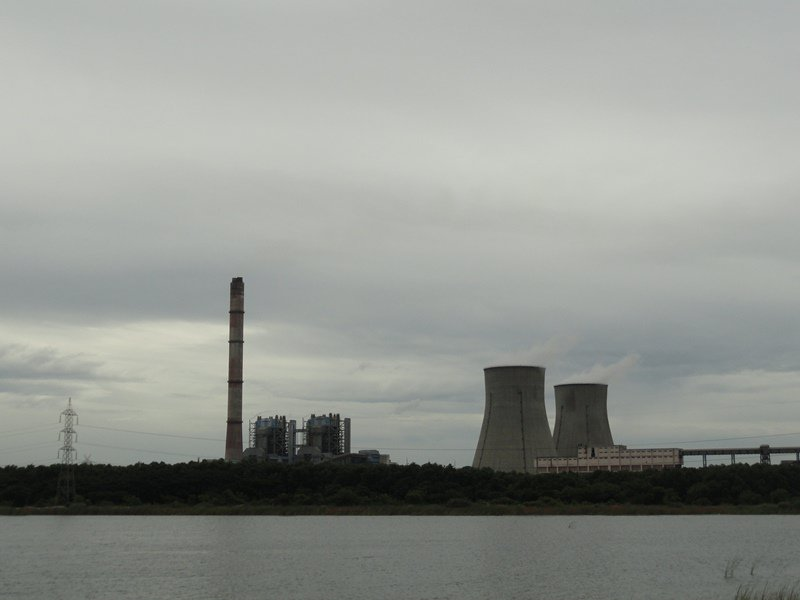
- Neyveli Thermal Power Station-I
- Location of the Neyveli Thermal Power Station-I in Tamil Nadu
- Country: India
- Location: Neyveli, Tamil Nadu
- Coordinates: 11°35′34″N 79°28′17″E
- Status: Operational
- Commission date: Unit 1: July 1962; Unit 2-4 : September 1963; Unit 5 : 1964; Unit 6 : 1965; Unit 7 : 1967; Unit 8 : 1969; Unit 9 : 1970; Unit 10 : 2002; Unit 11 : 2003
- Operator: Neyveli Lignite Corporation

Thermal power station
- Primary fuel: Lignite

Power generation
- Units operational: 2 X 210 MW
- Make and model: LMZ; Electrosila
- Units decommissioned: 6 X 50 MW; 3 X 100 MW
- Nameplate capacity: 420 MW

Neyveli Thermal Power Station-II
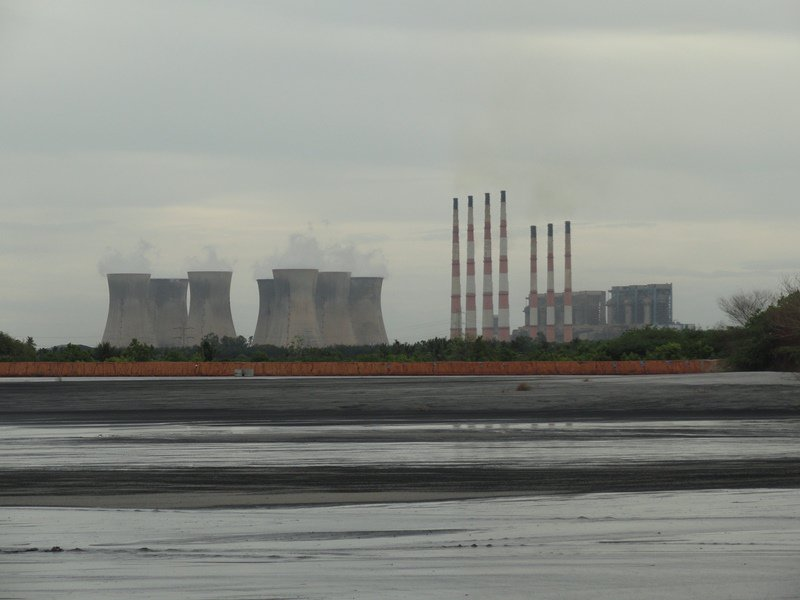
- Neyveli Thermal Power Station-II
- Location of the Neyveli Thermal Power Station-II in Tamil Nadu
- Country: India
- Coordinates: 11°33′29″N 79°26′33″E
- Status: Operational
- Commission date: Unit 1: March 1986; Unit 2: June 1993
- Operator: Neyveli Lignite Corporation

Thermal power station
- Primary fuel: Lignite

Power generation
- Units operational: 7 X 210 MW; 2 X 250 MW
- Make and model: Franco Tosi; BHEL
- Nameplate capacity: 1970 MW

Neyveli New Thermal Power Station
- Location of the Neyveli New Thermal Power Station in Tamil Nadu
- Coordinates: 11°35′28″N 79°27′09″E
- Status: Operational
- Commission date: Unit 1: September 2019; Unit 2: February 2021
- Operator: Neyveli Lignite Corporation

Thermal power station
- Primary fuel: Lignite

Power generation
- Units operational: 2 X 500 MW
- Nameplate capacity: 1000 MW

Neyveli Thermal Power Station is a set of power plants situated near lignite mines of Neyveli. It consists of three distinct units (Neyveli Thermal Power Station I, Neyveli Thermal Power Station II and Neyveli New Thermal Power Station) capable of producing 420 MW, 1,970 MW and 1000 MW respectively including their expansion units. It is operated by NLC. The total installed capacity of this station is 3390 MW as of April 2021.

== Neyveli Thermal Power Station I ==
The Neyveli Thermal Power Station I has configuration of 600 MW (6x50-MW units and 3x100-MW units). All these units were commissioned between May 1962 and September 1970. The plant is equipped with boilers from the Taganrog Metallurgical Plant, turbines from LMZ and generators from Electrosila, imported from the Soviet Union under Indo-Soviet assistance programme. It was planned that the Neyveli Thermal Power Station I will be decommissioned between 2011 and 2014; however, in 2011 the period of operations was extended for five years. On 20 May 2014 a High Pressure steam heater, one of the equipments of turbine package burst in a unit of Thermal Power Station I, killed one engineer and injured 5 others. Two out of the 5 died later in hospital unable to survive the wound. Incidentally, it was Neyveli Lignite Corporation's 58th Raising Day.

Two units of 210 MW capacity each were also added under Stage I expansion which are under commercial operation.

After the construction of Neyveli New Thermal Power Station, the first units were decommissioned and only the two 210 MW units remain in operation.

== Neyveli Thermal Power Station II ==
The 1470 MW (7x210 MW) Neyveli Thermal Power Station II was built in two stages. At the first stage between March 1986 and March 1988 three units with capacity of 210 MW each were commissioned. Boilers were supplied by Ganz-Danubius and generators were supplied by Franco Tosi. At the second stage from March 1991 to June 1993 four units with the same capacity, supplied by Bharat Heavy Electricals Limited, were added.

Under Stage II expansion, two units of 250 MW each were installed by BHEL. These units use circulating fluidised bed combustion (CFBC) boilers.

== Neyveli New Thermal Power Station ==
Neyveli New Thermal Power Station (NNTPS) is a 1,000 MW lignite-fired thermal power plant located at Neyveli in Cuddalore district of Tamil Nadu, India. The power plant is operated by NLC India Limited and comprises two units of 500 MW each. The station was established as part of a replacement programme for the ageing units of Neyveli Thermal Power Station I which were being phased out after completing their service life.

The first unit was commissioned in December 2019 and the second unit in July 2020. The generated power is allocated to the Southern Region states including Tamil Nadu, Kerala, Karnataka, Andhra Pradesh, Telangana and the Union Territory of Puducherry.

== See also ==
- List of power stations in India
