= Cuddalore IL&FS Thermal Power Station =

Power station in Tamil Nadu, India

- Country: India
- Location: Cuddalore, Tamil Nadu
- Coordinates: 11°31′17.8″N 79°45′06.6″E
- Status: Operational
- Commission date: Unit 1: September 2015; Unit 2: March 2016
- Operators: IL&FS Ltd

Thermal power station
- Primary fuel: Coal

Power generation
- Units operational: 2 X 600 MW
- Nameplate capacity: 1200 MW

Cuddalore IL&FS Power Station is a 1,200-megawatt (MW) coal-fired power station in Tamil Nadu, India.

== Background on plant ==
The project received environmental clearance in 2010 as a 3,600 MW thermal power project to be developed in phases, with Phase-I comprising 2 x 600 MW units and Phase-II comprising the remaining 2,400 MW (3X800 MW).

On 13 April 2012, SEPCO3 of China said it had signed a $2.4 billion contract to build the second phase of the coal-fired power complex. IL&FS said it would import coal from Indonesia, Australia and South Africa to fuel the plant. It said it had acquired a mine in Indonesia to supply the generators. IL&FS plans to sell the power from the project to state-run distribution companies on a long-term basis as well as in the open market.

The project faced delays due to an order by National Green Tribunal in June 2012 for a flue gas desulphurisation unit. Due to this, the two units are proposed to come up by December 2014 and February 2015, respectively, at a cost of Rs 9,500 crore.

In February 2014 the project was amended to be 2X600 MW and 3X660 MW.

On 10 November 2014, the National Green Tribunal cancelled the Environmental Clearance for the project, on the grounds that the project had not conducted a proper cumulative impact assessment of the project. It ordered "a fresh review of the environmental clearance on the basis of a fresh cumulative impact assessment study."

Unit 1 was commissioned in September 2015 and unit 2 in March 2016.

With no forward progress more than two years after receiving environmental clearance, Phase II appears to be shelved or abandoned.
