= States of India by installed power capacity =

This is a list of states and territories of India by installed power generation capacity. This is measured in megawatts (MW), one of which is equal to one million watts of electric power. As of 31 July 2026, the installed capacity is around 552 GW. Gujarat (77 GW) leads in power generation capacity, followed by Rajasthan (64 GW) and Maharashtra (61 GW).

== List ==
State-wise all India installed power generation capacity as of 31 July 2026
State/union territory	Fossil (thermal power) (in MW)					Non-fossil (clean power) (in MW)							Total (in MW)	% of national total	% of clean power in capacity
State/union territory	Coal	Lignite	Gas	Diesel	Sub-total thermal	Nuclear	Large hydro	Small hydro	Wind	Biopower	Solar	Sub-total non-fossil	Total (in MW)	% of national total	% of clean power in capacity
Western Region	83271.01	1400.00	9399.39	0.00	94070.40	3240.00	7392.00	730.24	26715.42	3584.89	62928.64	104591.19	198661.59	35.99%	52.65%
Gujarat	14692.00	1400.00	6580.31	-	22672.31	1840.00	1990.00	113.30	16613.06	129.85	33763.96	54450.17	77122.48	13.97%	70.60%
Maharashtra	23316.01	-	2819.08	-	26135.09	1400.00	3047.00	384.28	6415.91	2999.97	20347.66	34594.82	60729.91	11.00%	56.97%
Madhya Pradesh	21170.00	-	-	-	21170.00	-	2235.00	123.71	3686.45	159.46	6544.09	12748.71	33918.71	6.14%	37.59%
Chhattisgarh	24093.00	-	-	-	24093.00	-	120.00	108.90	-	289.92	2033.81	2552.63	26645.63	4.83%	9.58%
Dadra and Nagar Haveli and Daman and Diu	-	-	-	-	-	-	-	-	-	3.75	143.40	147.15	147.15	0.03%	100.00%
Goa	-	-	-	-	-	-	-	0.05	-	1.94	95.71	97.70	97.70	0.02%	100.00%
Southern Region	47342.50	3640.00	3346.11	460.49	54789.10	3320.00	13596.15	1938.48	25880.23	3831.80	41839.89	90406.55	145195.65	26.30%	62.27%
Tamil Nadu	11392.50	3640.00	844.58	211.70	16088.78	2440.00	2203.20	123.05	12303.79	1055.12	14166.47	32291.63	48380.41	8.76%	66.75%
Karnataka	9480.00	-	370.05	25.20	9875.25	880.00	3689.20	1284.73	8915.24	1917.05	11635.52	28321.74	38196.99	6.92%	74.15%
Andhra Pradesh	13890.00	-	1739.40	36.80	15666.20	-	3290.00	164.51	4461.58	615.02	8144.32	16675.43	32341.63	5.86%	51.56%
Telangana	12580.00	-	-	-	12580.00	-	2405.60	89.67	128.10	242.11	5165.10	8030.58	20610.58	3.73%	38.96%
Kerala	-	-	359.58	159.96	519.54	-	2008.15	276.52	71.52	2.50	2626.70	4985.39	5504.93	1.00%	90.56%
Puducherry	-	-	32.50	-	32.50	-	-	-	-	-	92.51	92.51	125.01	0.02%	74.00%
Lakshadweep	-	-	-	26.83	26.83	-	-	-	-	-	9.27	9.27	36.10	0.01%	25.68%
Northern Region	50949.00	1580.00	5711.96	0.00	58240.96	2220.00	22065.76	1807.05	5541.24	3727.64	56623.41	91985.10	150226.06	27.22%	61.23%
Rajasthan	9244.00	1580.00	1022.83	-	11846.83	1780.00	412.50	23.85	5541.24	222.42	44135.33	52115.34	63962.17	11.59%	81.48%
Uttar Pradesh	30695.00	-	1493.14	-	32188.14	440.00	501.60	50.60	-	2329.89	6024.43	9346.52	41534.66	7.52%	22.50%
Himachal Pradesh	-	-	-	-	-	-	11571.01	1013.46	-	10.20	385.29	12979.96	12979.96	2.35%	100.00%
Punjab	5680.00	-	-	-	5680.00	-	1096.30	176.10	-	582.59	1603.19	3458.18	9138.18	1.66%	37.84%
Haryana	5330.00	-	431.59	-	5761.59	-	-	73.50	-	330.88	2856.46	3260.84	9022.43	1.63%	36.14%
Uttarakhand	-	-	664.00	-	664.00	-	5035.35	233.82	-	161.49	891.87	6322.53	6986.53	1.27%	90.49%
Jammu and Kashmir	-	-	-	-	-	-	3360.00	189.93	-	5.00	167.92	3722.85	3722.85	0.67%	100.00%
Delhi	-	-	2100.40	-	2100.40	-	-	-	-	85.17	461.30	546.47	2646.87	0.48%	20.65%
Ladakh	-	-	-	-	-	-	89.00	45.79	-	-	18.75	153.54	153.54	0.03%	100.00%
Chandigarh	-	-	-	-	-	-	-	-	-	-	78.85	78.85	78.85	0.01%	100.00%
Eastern Region	41845.00	0.00	0.00	92.71	41937.71	0.00	5987.75	374.24	0.00	581.44	2347.82	9291.25	51228.96	9.28%	18.14%
West Bengal	13895.00	-	-	-	13895.00	-	1341.20	98.50	-	351.86	363.50	2155.06	16050.06	2.91%	13.43%
Odisha	9950.00	-	-	-	9950.00	-	2154.55	140.63	-	64.22	1132.43	3491.83	13441.83	2.44%	25.98%
Bihar	10170.00	-	-	-	10170.00	-	-	70.70	-	145.22	493.38	709.30	10879.30	1.97%	6.52%
Jharkhand	7830.00	-	-	-	7830.00	-	210.00	4.05	-	20.14	318.12	552.31	8382.31	1.52%	6.59%
Sikkim	-	-	-	-	-	-	2282.00	55.11	-	-	7.56	2344.67	2344.67	0.42%	100.00%
Andaman and Nicobar Islands	-	-	-	92.71	92.71	-	-	5.25	-	-	32.82	38.07	130.78	0.02%	29.11%
North-Eastern Region	750.00	0.00	1664.95	36.00	2450.95	0.00	3023.00	331.75	0.00	21.80	855.01	4231.56	6682.51	1.21%	63.32%
Assam	750.00	-	597.36	-	1347.36	-	346.00	34.11	-	8.00	736.29	1124.40	2471.76	0.45%	45.49%
Arunachal Pradesh	-	-	-	-	-	-	2115.00	140.61	-	-	15.72	2271.33	2271.33	0.41%	100.00%
Tripura	-	-	1067.60	-	1067.60	-	-	16.01	-	-	43.04	59.05	1126.65	0.20%	5.24%
Meghalaya	-	-	-	-	-	-	322.00	55.03	-	13.80	4.28	395.11	395.11	0.07%	100.00%
Manipur	-	-	-	36.00	36.00	-	105.00	5.45	-	-	17.56	128.01	164.01	0.03%	78.05%
Mizoram	-	-	-	-	-	-	60.00	45.47	-	-	34.42	139.89	139.89	0.03%	100.00%
Nagaland	-	-	-	-	-	-	75.00	35.07	-	-	3.68	113.75	113.75	0.02%	100.00%
Total	224157.51	6620.00	20122.41	589.20	251489.12	8780.00	52064.66	5181.76	58136.89	11747.57	164594.77	300505.65	551994.77	100.00%	54.44%

Other renewable energy sources include SHP (small hydro power - plants ≤ 25 MW), biomass power, urban & industrial waste, solar and wind energy.

== See also ==
- List of power stations in India
- Energy policy of India
- Electricity in India
- Solar power in India
- Wind power in India
- Nuclear power in India
