= New Cossipore Thermal Power Station =

New Cossipore Thermal Power Station is a coal-based thermal power plant located at Cossipore in Kolkata city in the Indian state of West Bengal. The power plant is operated by the CESC Limited.

It was previously known as Battery Factory. The power plant had been shut down completely in 2004 due increased cost of operation. Now, it has been converted to a 132kV substation under CESC limited.

== Capacity ==
It has an installed capacity of 100 MW. It became fully operational in 1949.
