= Odisha Hydro Power Corporation =

Indian hydroelectricity company

- Company type: Government
- Industry: Hydro Electricity
- Founded: 1995
- Headquarters: OHPC Corporate Office, Janpath, Bhoinagar, Bhubaneswar, Bhubaneswar, Odisha, India
- Area served: Odisha
- Key people: Sri Vishal Kumar Dev, IAS (Chairman-cum-Managing Director)
- Owner: Government of Odisha
- Website: www.ohpcltd.com

The Odisha Hydro Power Corporation or OHPC is a Public Sector Undertaking of Government of Odisha which was incorporated under the Companies Act, 1956 on 21 April 1995 with the objective of establishing, operating, maintaining, renovating & modernizing hydro, thermal and other forms of power generating station besides owning, developing and operating coal mines for supply of fuel to the thermal power stations.

== Power stations ==
- Hirakud Hydro Electric Project (Burla)
- Chiplima Hydro Electric Project (Chiplima)
- Balimela Hydro Electric Project (Balimela)
- Rengali Hydro Electric Project (Rengali)
- Upper Kolab Hydro Electric Project (Bariniput)
- Upper Indravati Hydro Electric Project (Mukhiguda)
- Machkund Hydro Electric Project, Onukudeli

== Projects under construction or approved ==
- Potteru Small Hydro Electric Project
- Sindol Complex (Deogaon, Kapasira, Godhaneswar)
- Middle Kolab Hydro Electric Project
- Tel Integrated Project
- Lower Vansadhara Project
- Balijori Hydro Electric Project or Bhimkund & Baigundi Cascading Project
- Salki Hydro Electric Project
- Khadago Dam Project
- Uttel & Roul Integrated Project
- Mahanadi-Brahmani River Link
- Barmul Hydro Electric Project
- Pumped Storage Scheme
- Small Hydro Electric Project
- Jambira Dam Toe
- Kanpur Dam Toe
