= Tundri =

- Village
- Location in Chhattisgarh, India Tundri (India)
- Coordinates: 22.65935°N 82.0831°E
- Country: India
- State: Chhattisgarh
- District: Janjgir Champa
- Elevation: 124 m (407 ft)

Population (2001)
  - Total: 2,865

Languages
  - Official: Hindi, Chhattisgarhi
- Time zone: UTC+5:30 (IST)
- PIN: 495695
- Vehicle registration: CG

Tundri is a very big village in the Dabhara tahsil; it is located in the Janjgir Chanpa District in Chhattisgarh, India. According to the 2001 census, 2,865 people lived in the village. The population has now grown to approximately 6,000.

== Geography and Climate ==
It is located 17 km from Dabhara and 70 km from the district capital Janjgir Champa. It lies 178 km away from the state capital of Raipur.

== Education ==
Tundri has seven schools:

- Gov Higher Secondary School Jherabhata (Tundri)
- Sarswti Sishu Mandir
- Saskiya Kanya Shala
- Gov Middle School Jherabhata
- Gov Primary School Beladula
- Gov Primary School Kanchanpur
- Agape Mission School
