= Meenakshi Power Plant Nellore =

A 1000 MW power plant, Meenakshi Energy Pvt. Ltd. is located at Nellore in Andhra Pradesh. The first phase of the Project (300 MW) was configured in a unique “part tolling-part merchant “ configuration with PTC India Limited. The Plant has a Capacity of 1000 MW (Unit I – 2 x 150 MW; Unit II – 2 x 350 MW). It is located adjacent to Krishnapatnam port and near coal basins Units (size in MW) Unit I (150 MW) Unit II (150 MW) Unit III (350 MW) Unit IV (350 MW). Water from the Kandaleru creek Sea is used as source for the plant. Their outstanding debt was over Rs 4,000 crore and was forced to sale, led by REC [Rural Electrification Corporation] and SBI. India Power Corp. Ltd, a SREI Group company acquired this power plant to run on coal imported from Indonesia, which will be directed by Raj Kanoria. The Bench of Judicial Members admitted the insolvency petition as per the provisions code. Meenakshi Pvt. Ltd. availed a term loan and working capital from the lenders leadings to insolvency. As a result, Engie Global purchased the shares and was inducted as the promoter of the corporate debtor.GDF Suez, France acquired 74% stake in Meenakshi thermal power project in Nellore later.
