= Angul Thermal Power Station =

Power station in Odisha, India

Coordinates: 21.137703°N 84.982665°E

Angul Thermal Power Station is a coal based thermal power project located at Derang village in Angul district in Indian state of Odisha. The power plant is one of the coal based power plants of Jindal India Thermal Power Limited.

Coal for the power plant is sourced from Mahanadi Coalfields Limited and water is sourced from Samal Barrage on Brahmani River which is 14 km away.

Bharat Heavy Electricals is the EPC contractor for this project.

== Capacity ==
Its planned capacity is 1200 MW (2x600 MW). There is a plan to add a third unit of 600 MW to this Angul-1 phase. Angul-2 phase having 2x660 MW units is yet to be approved by the Government of India.

State	Unit Number	Capacity (MW)	Date of Commissioning	Status
Angul-1	1	600	2014 May	Running.
Angul-1	2	600	2015 January	Running
