= Neyveli Zero Lignite Power Station =

Coal-fired power station in Tamil Nadu, India

The Neyveli Zero Lignite Power Station is an lignite based power station at Neyveli in Cuddalore district, Tamil Nadu, India. The power station is owned by ST CMS Electric Company India Limited, which is a subsidiary of TAQA (also known as Abu Dhabi National Energy Company) which acquired it from Sharad Tak Power Systems in 2007.

== Capacity ==
The installed capacity of the power plant in 250 MW (1x250 MW). There were allegation of corruption in granting of power plant to Sharad Tak Power Systems.

Unit Number	Capacity (MW)	Status	Date of Commissioning
1	250	Running	2002 October
