= VS Lignite Power Plant =

VS Lignite Power Plant is a lignite-based thermal power plant located in Gurha village in Bikaner district, Rajasthan. The power plant is owned by the Chennai-based Refex Industries group.

== Power plant ==
The thermal power station has an installed capacity of 135 MW. It has a circulating fluidised bed combustion boiler (CFBC), 440T/H, at 13.9 MPa operating pressure, 535 °C operating temperature and a 220 kV switch yard
