= Kamalanga Thermal Power Plant =

Coordinates: 20.863330°N 85.269082°E

Kamalanga Thermal Power Plant is a coal based thermal power project located at Kamalanga in Dhenkanal district in Indian state of Odisha. The power plant is one of the coal based power plants of GMR Kamalanga Energy Limited, a subsidiary of GMR Group.

Coal for the power plant is sourced from Mahanadi Coalfields Limited.

== Capacity ==
Its planned capacity is 1050 MW (3x350 MW). There is plan to add another unit of 350 MW in second phase of the power plant.

Unit Number	Capacity (MW)	Date of Commissioning	Status
1	350	2013 April	Running.
2	350	2013 November	Running.
3	350	2014 March	Running.
