= Maibella =

- village
- Country: India
- State: Assam
- District: Charaideo

Government
  - Body: Gram panchayat

Languages
  - Official: Assamese
- Time zone: UTC+5:30 (IST)
- ISO 3166 code: IN-AS
- Vehicle registration: AS

Maibella is a town located in the east side of Charaideo district, Assam (India). The town is home to APGCL (ASEB) which is a major electricity production unit in the whole North Eastern Region.
