= Maharashtra I Solar Power Plant =

Indian power utility

Maharashtra I
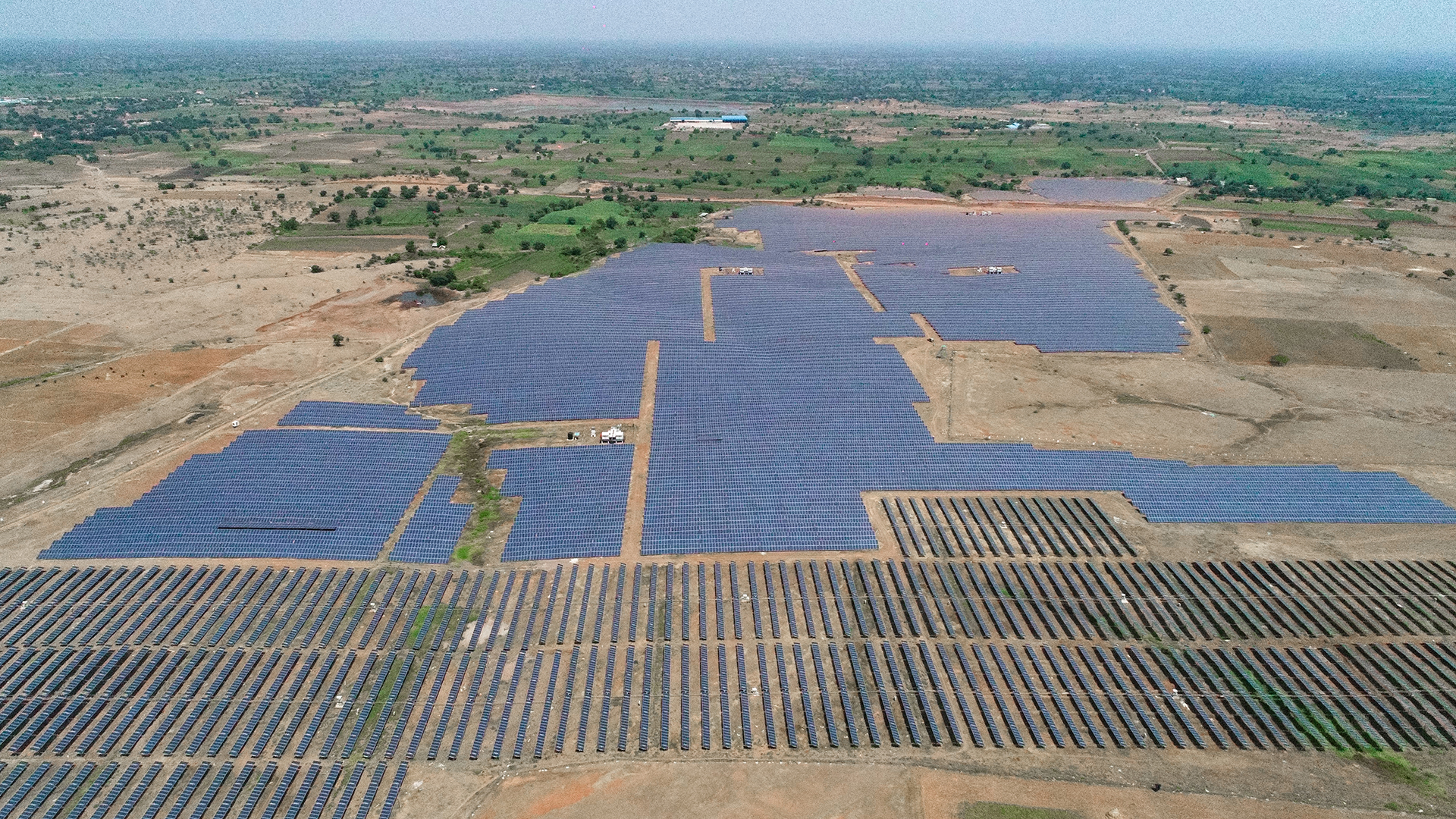
- Country: India
- Location: Chatgaon, Beed District, Maharashtra
- Coordinates: 18°57′42″N 76°12′46″E
- Status: Operational
- Commission date: 1 August 2017; 7 years ago
- Owner: Talettutayi Solar Projects Four Private Limited

Solar farm
- Type: Standard PV
- Collectors: 207,015
- Total collector area: 306 acres

Power generation
- Nameplate capacity: 67.2 MW_{DC}

The Maharashtra I solar park southwest of Chatgaon Village in the Beed district of Maharashtra, India, is a 67.2 megawatt (MWD_{C}) photovoltaic power station, which was commissioned in August 2017.

Location of Power Plant Maharashtra I in the State of Maharashtra

It covers an area of 306 acres (124 hectares) and supplies about 126,000 people with energy. Part of the plant uses a seasonal tracking system with the remaining using a horizontal single axis tracking system, using polycrystalline solar PV technology. The produced electricity is taken by Maharashtra State Electricity Distribution Company Limited and Solar Energy Corporation of India (SECI). The solar park was constructed using 207,015 solar modules. The estimated reduction of CO_{2} is more than 41,000 metric tons per year. Solar Arise currently owns and operates 130 MW of grid-connected solar power projects in India.

India has a target of developing 22,000 MW (75 billion Btu/h) of solar power plants and an additional 8,000 MW (27 billion Btu/h) is expected in local generation, bringing the total to 30,000 MW (100 billion Btu/h) by 2022, which was later increased to 100,000 megawatts.
