= Madikheda Dam =

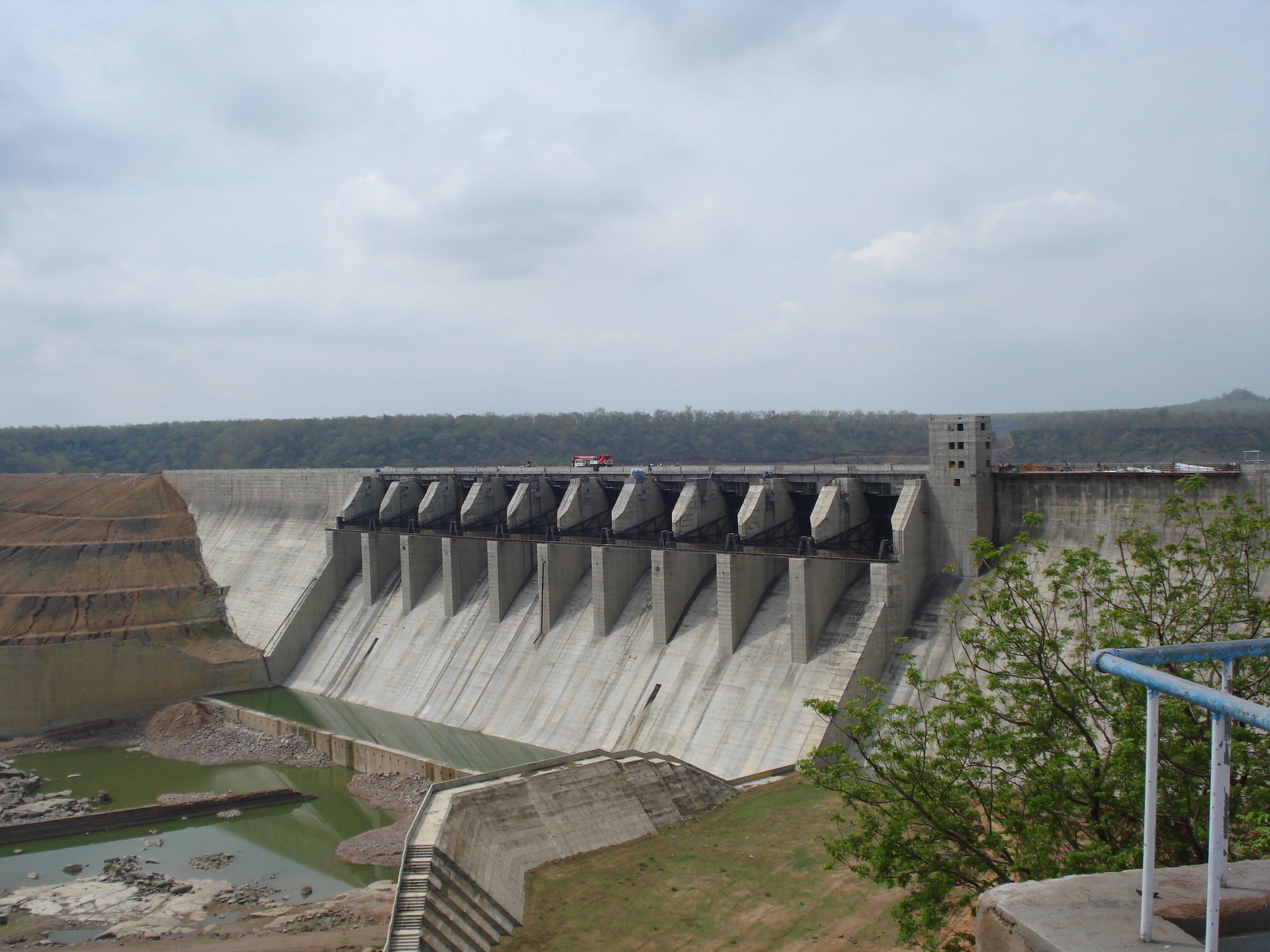
- View of Madikheda Dam from down stream

- Location within India
- Official name: Madikheda (Mohini Sagar) Dam
- Location: Madikheda, Shivpuri District, Madhya Pradesh
- Coordinates: 25°33′20″N 77°51′10″E
- Construction began: 1978
- Opening date: 2008
- Operators: Water Resources Department, Madhya Pradesh

Dam and spillways
- Impounds: Sindh River
- Height: 62 m (203 ft)
- Length: 1,070 m (3,510 ft)

Reservoir
- Creates: Madikheda Reservoir

Madikheda Dam is a multi-purpose dam situated in Shivpuri district in Madhya Pradesh, India. Before independence village of Madikheda was under the chiefs of Raipur Dhamkan a seat of Thakur who comes from Pawaiya Chauhan clan. Chauhans of Raipur were dominating chiefs of former Narwar zila. Thakur sahib Shree Niranjan singhji Pawaiya was the last Chief of Raipur Dhamkan succeeded by his son Shree Parikshit singhji, Later Shree Parikshit singhji settled madikheda and became first chieftain or Pradhan of Madikheda along with some other villages of the Raipur Dhamkan. He issued two sons Shree Pran singhji and Shree Jihan singhji. Thakur sahib Lambardar Shree Jihan singhji Pawaiya was the last pradhan or chieftain of Madikheda. the former village of Madikheda was affected by dam project on Sindh river with 12 other villages on the bank of river in 1975 -1977.

== Specification ==
- Length of Dam - 1070 meter
- Length of spillway - 176.50 meter
- Full Reservoir Level - 346.25 meter
- Maximum Water Level - 346.85 meter
- Catchment area - 5540 km^{2}
- Submergence area - 5672.91 ha
- Villages affected - 13
- Dam height - 62 m
- No. of gates - 10
- Year of start - 1978
- Project benefits
  - Culturable command area - 98.25 th.ha
  - Ultimate potential - 162.0 th. ha
  - Districts benefitted - Gwalior, Shivpuri, Datia, Bhind
- Hydro power - 60 MW (20x3)
- Year of completion - 2008

== See also ==
- River Basins in Madhya Pradesh
- Category:Dams in Madhya Pradesh
