= SEPCO3 =

Shandong Electric Power Construction Corporation III
- Industry: Construction and engineering
- Founded: 1985; 41 years ago
- Headquarters: Qingdao, Shandong, China
- Website: www.sepco3.com

SEPCO3, stylized as sepcoIII, (Shandong Electric Power Construction Corporation III or SEPCO III) (Chinese: 山东电力建设第三工程公司) is a Chinese construction and engineering company that designs, builds, operates and owns power plants.

SEPCO3 offers the construction of power plants via the EPC method (Engineering, Procurement, Construction) on a turnkey lump sum basis. Moreover, SEPCO3 also offers the development of power plant projects through BOT (Build-Operate-Transfer) and BOO(T) Build-Operate-Own(-Transfer) methods. The technologies engineered by the company include Thermal power plants, nuclear power plants, gas fired simple and combined cycle plants, wind power, biomass power, solar power and hydro power as well as substations. As a large company, vertically integrated parts like logistics and shipping, operation, maintenance, design and financing are also handled internally.

The company has gone on the path of international expansion and has carried out construction in Egypt, India, Indonesia, Jordan, Nigeria, Oman, Saudi Arabia, and Singapore. In overseas work, SEPCO3 has had particular success in India where it held 20% of the market for power generation construction in 2011 which compares well to the market share of about 50% in India held by all Chinese power construction companies. From the period of 2005-2011, SEPCO3 has taken US$9 billion worth of projects in India. The subsidiary in India has become a substantial operation in its own right employing 7,000 Indian workers directly and more than 50,000 local people engaged with its subcontractors. The management has stated plans to increase localization by increasing the numbers of Indians among management personnel with the number of local nationals holding managerial positions being about 50% in 2011.
