= Super thermal power station =

Super Thermal Power Stations or Super Power Station are a series of ambitious power projects planned by the Government of India. With India being a country of chronic power deficits, the Government of India has planned to provide 'power for all' by the end of the Eleventh Plan. The capacity of thermal power is 1000 MW and above. This would entail the creation of an additional capacity of at least 100,000 Megawatts by 2012. The Ultra Mega Power Projects, each with a capacity of 4000 megawatts or above, are being developed with the aim of bridging this gap.

The Super Thermal Power Stations were started by Government of India in the 1990s. The Ministry of Power, in association with the Central Electricity Authority and Power Finance Corporation Ltd., has launched an initiative for the development of coal-based Super Thermal Power Stations in India. These projects will be awarded to developers on the basis of competitive bidding.

Ramagundam Super Thermal power station, one of the biggest thermal power stations in India, is a coal based power station situated at Ramagundam Karimnagar District.

The station started power generation in 1983. The station generates about 2600 MW of power annually. The fuel for the power generation is taken from the South Godavari Coal Fields and water is taken from Pochampad Dam. The power generated from the power plant is shared by the south Indian states of Andhra Pradesh, Karnataka, Tamil Nadu, Kerala and Pondicherry.

== Thermal Power Station ==
Following are some of the super thermal power station in India having capacity greater than 1000 MW:

Sr. No.	Power Plant	State	Operator	Capacity
1	Vedanta Jharsuguda Captive Power Plant	Odisha	Vedanta Resources	1,215 MW
2	Sterlite Jharsuguda Power Station	Odisha	Sterlite Energy	2,400 MW
3	KSK Mahanadi Power Project	Chhattisgarh	KSK Energy Ventures Pvt Limited	1,800MW
4	Jindal Tamnar Thermal Power Plant	Chhattisgarh	Jindal Power Limited	3,400 MW
5	Sipat Thermal Power Plant	Chhattisgarh	NTPC	2,980 MW
6	Talcher Super Thermal Power Station	Odisha	NTPC	3,000 MW
7	Satpura Thermal Power Station	Madhya Pradesh	Madhya Pradesh Power Generation Company Limited	1,392.5 MW
8	Rihand Thermal Power Station	Uttar Pradesh	NTPC	3,000 MW
9	Singrauli Super Thermal Power Station	Uttar Pradesh	NTPC	2,050 MW
10	Rosa Thermal Power Plant	Uttar Pradesh	Reliance Power Limited	1,200 MW
11	Vindhyachal Thermal Power Station	Madhya Pradesh	NTPC	4,760 MW
12	JSW Barmer Power Station	Rajasthan	JSW Energy Limited	1,080 MW
13	Kota Super Thermal Power Plant	Rajasthan	Rajasthan Rajya Vidyut Utpadan Nigam Limited	1,240 MW
14	Suratgarh Super Thermal Power Plant	Rajasthan	Rajasthan Rajya Vidyut Utpadan Nigam Limited	2,820 MW
15	Neyveli Thermal Power Station II	Tamil Nadu	Neyevelli Lignite Corp. Limited	1,470 MW
16	Vallur Thermal Power Project	Tamil Nadu	NTPC Tamil Nadu Energy	1,500 MW
17	Kahalgaon Super Thermal Power Station	Bihar	NTPC	2,340 MW
18	Dr Narla Tata Rao Thermal Power Station	Andhra Pradesh	Andhra Pradesh Power Generation Corporation	1,760 MW
19	NTPC Ramagundam	Telangana	NTPC	2,600 MW
20	Simhadri Super Thermal Power Plant	Andhra Pradesh	NTPC	2,000 MW
21	Essar Salaya Power Plant	Gujarat	Essar Power Limited	1,200 MW
22	Wanakbori Thermal Power Station	Gujarat	Gujarat Urja Vikas Nigam Limited	1,470 MW
23	Raichur Thermal Power Station	Karnataka	Karnataka Power Corporation Limited	1,470 MW
24	JSW Ratnagiri Power Station	Maharashtra	JSW Energy Limited	1,200 MW
25	Udupi Power Plant	Karnataka	Adani Power Limited	1,200 MW
26	Bakreshwar Thermal Power Station	West Bengal	West Bengal Power Development Corporation Limited	1,050 MW
27	Kolaghat Thermal Power Station	West bengal	West Bengal Power Development Corporation Limited	1,260 MW
28	Mejia Thermal Power Station	West Bengal	Damodar Valley Corporation	2,340 MW
31	Indiabulls Amravati Thermal Power Project	Maharashtra	Indiabulls Power Limited	1,350 MW
32	Chandrapur Super Thermal Power Station	Maharashtra	Maharashtra State Power Generation Limited	3,340 MW
33	Indiabulls Nashik Thermal Power Station	Maharashtra	Indiabulls Power Limited	1,350 MW
34	Tiroda Thermal Power Station	Maharashtra	Adani Power Limited	3,300 MW
35	Indira Gandhi Super Thermal Power Project	Haryana	Aravali Power Company Private Limited	1,500 MW
36	Mahatma Gandhi Super Thermal Power Project	Haryana	CLP Power India Limited	1,320 MW
37	Essar Mahan Power Plant	Madhya Pradesh	Essar Power Limited	1,200 MW
38	Rajiv Gandhi TPS Hissar	Haryana	Haryana Power Generation Corporation	1,200 MW
38	Panipat Thermal Power Station	Haryana	Haryana Power Generation Corporation	1,367.8 MW
40	Mundra Thermal Power Station	Gujarat	Adani Power Limited	4,620 MW
41	Mundra Ultra Mega Power Plant	Gujarat	Tata Power Corporation Limited	4,150 MW
42	Barh Super Thermal Power Station	Bihar	NTPC	1,320 MW
43	Kothagudem Thermal Power Station	Telangana	Telangana Power Generation Corporation	1,720 MW
44	Korba Super Thermal Power Plant	Chhattisgarh	NTPC	2,600 MW
45	Sanjay Gandhi TPS Birsinghpur	Madhya Pradesh	Madhya Pradesh Power Generation Company Limited	1,340 MW
46	Koradi Thermal Power Station	Maharashtra	Maharashtra State Power Generation Limited	1,080 MW
47	Mauda Super Thermal Power Station	Maharashtra	NTPC	1,000 MW
48	Khaparkheda Thermal Power Station	Maharashtra	Maharashtra State Power Generation Limited	1,340 MW
49	Bhusawal Thermal Power Station	Maharashtra	Maharashtra State Power Generation Limited	1,420 MW
50	Parli Thermal Power Station	Maharashtra	Maharashtra State Power Generation Limited	1,130 MW
51	Mettur Thermal Power Station	Tamil Nadu	TNPGCL	1,440 MW
52	Tuticorin Thermal Power Station	Tamil Nadu	TNPGCL	1,050 MW
53	North Chennai Thermal Power Station	Tamil Nadu	TNPGCL	1,830 MW
54	Feroze Gandhi Unchahar Thermal Power Plant	Uttar Pradesh	NTPC	1,050 MW
55	NTPC Dadri	Uttar Pradesh	NTPC	2,637 MW
56	Anpara Thermal Power Station	Uttar Pradesh	Uttar Pradesh Rajya Vidyut Utpadan Nigam Limited	1,630 MW
57	Obra Thermal Power Station	Uttar Pradesh	Uttar Pradesh Rajya Vidyut Utpadan Nigam Limited	1,382 MW
58	Parichha Thermal Power Station	Uttar Pradesh	Uttar Pradesh Rajya Vidyut Utpadan Nigam Limited	1,140 MW
59	Koderma Thermal Power Station	Jharkhand	Damodar Valley Corporation	1,000 MW
60	Durgapur Steel Thermal Power Station	West Bengal	Damodar Valley Corporation	1,000 MW
61	Guru Gobind Singh Super Thermal Power Plant	Punjab	Punjab State Power Corporation	1,260 MW
62	Maithon Power Plant	Jharkhand	Maithon Power Limited	1,050 MW
63	Trombay Thermal Power Station	Maharashtra	Tata Power	1,580 MW
64	Angul Thermal Power Station	Odisha	Jindal Steel and Power	1,200 MW
65	Shree Singaji Thermal Power Station	Madhya Pradesh	Madhya Pradesh Power Generating Company Limited	2,520 MW
66	Kamalanga Thermal Power Plant	Odisha	GMR Group	1,050 MW
67	Farakka Super Thermal Power Station	West Bengal	NTPC	2,100 MW

== See also ==
- Energy policy of India
