= Department of Energy (Tamil Nadu) =

Indian state government department

Agency overview
- Formed: 1993
- Jurisdiction: Tamil Nadu
- Headquarters: Chennai
- Minister responsible: CTR Nirmal Kumar, Minister for Energy Department
- Agency executive: Dr. P. Senthil Kumar, IAS, Principal Secretary to Government
- Parent agency: Government of Tamil Nadu
- Child agencies: Tamil Nadu Electricity Board; Tamil Nadu Power Distribution Corporation Limited; Tamil Nadu Power Generation Corporation Limited; Tamil Nadu Green Energy Corporation Limited
- Website: Energy Department

The Department of Energy of state of Tamil Naduis one of the departments of Government of Tamil Nadu. The department was established in 1993 and is responsible for the production and distribution of energy.

== Objective ==
The department is responsible for the production and distribution of power. It enables power production from various resources and distribution of the same through various agencies and undertakings.

== Power production, distribution and transmission ==
Tamil Nadu Electricity Board (TNEB) is the nodal agency for power generation, transmission and distribution in Tamil Nadu. It functions through its subsidiaries: Tamil Nadu Power Generation Corporation Limited (TNPGCL) for power generation, Tamil Nadu Transmission Corporation Limited (TANTRANSCO) for transmission, Tamil Nadu Power Distribution Corporation Limited (TNPDCL) for power distribution, and Tamil Nadu Green Energy Corporation Limited (TNGECL) for renewable energy. As of 2023, the average daily consumption is 15,000 MW with 40% of the power generated locally with the remaining 60% met through purchases. As of 2022, the state was the fourth largest power consumer with a per capita availability of 1588.7 Kwh. As of 2023, the state has the third highest installed power capacity of 38,248 MW with thermal power being the largest contributor with more than 10,000 MW.

== New and renewable resources ==
As of 2023, 54.6% of power is generated from renewable resources. Tamil Nadu is the only state with two operational nuclear power plants at Kalpakkam, the first fully indigenous nuclear power station in India and Kudankulam, the largest nuclear power station in India and generates nearly one-third of the total nuclear power generated in the country. Tamil Nadu has the largest established wind power capacity with over 8,000 MW mostly based out of two regions, Palghat Gap and Muppandal, one of the largest operational onshore wind farms in the world. Tamil Nadu Energy Development Agency is the nodal agency for power generation from new and renewable resources and facilitates power generation from such sources in house-holds and small scale industries.

== Safety and inspection ==
The department of electrical inspection was established in 1903 as a part of Tamil Nadu Public Works Department and was formulated as a separate department in 1993. It is responsible for the ensuring the safety of electrical installations and infrastructure across the state.

== Financing ==
Tamil Nadu Power Finance and Infrastructure Development Corporation is the nodal agency responsible for managing the funds for facilitating the construction and maintenance of electrical infrastructure.

== See also ==
- Government of Tamil Nadu
- Tamil Nadu Government's Departments
- Ministry of Power (India)
- Ministry of New and Renewable Energy (India)
