= Tamil Nadu Green Energy Corporation Limited =

State-owned renewable energy company in India

- Type: State-owned enterprise
- Industry: Electric power generation
- Predecessor: Tamil Nadu Generation and Distribution Corporation; Tamil Nadu Energy Development Agency
- Founded: 2024
- Headquarters: Chennai, Tamil Nadu, India
- Area served: Tamil Nadu
- Key people: Dr. J Radhakrishnan IAS Chairman; Dr. Aneesh Sekhar IAS MD
- Products: Electricity
- Services: Power generation (renewable), hydro generation, solar, wind, energy storage
- Revenue: ▲₹1,607.11 crore (US$170 million) (2024–25)
- Operating income: ▲₹588.22 crore (US$61 million) (2024–25)
- Net income: ▲₹242.27 crore (US$25 million) (2024–25)
- Total assets: ▲₹81,526.69 crore (US$8.5 billion) (2024–25)
- Total equity: ▲₹−1,125.31 crore (US$−120 million) (2024–25)
- Parent: TNEB Limited
- Website: www.tngecl.org

Tamil Nadu Green Energy Corporation Limited (TNGECL) is a state-owned renewable energy company of the Government of Tamil Nadu. It was established in 2024 following the restructuring of Tamil Nadu Generation and Distribution Corporation Limited (TANGEDCO) to focus exclusively on renewable energy development including hydro, solar, wind and energy storage projects.

The company was formed by transferring the renewable energy activities of TANGEDCO and merging the Tamil Nadu Energy Development Agency (TEDA) into the new corporation.

TNGECL operates as a subsidiary of Tamil Nadu Electricity Board (TNEB) and is responsible for expanding renewable energy capacity as part of Tamil Nadu's clean energy transition.

== History ==
Electricity generation in Tamil Nadu was historically managed by the Tamil Nadu Electricity Board. In 2010, the board was reorganised into TNEB Limited with operational subsidiaries. In January 2024, the Government of Tamil Nadu approved further restructuring of TANGEDCO into separate generation, distribution and renewable energy companies to improve operational efficiency and accelerate renewable energy adoption. As part of this reform Renewable energy activities were transferred to TNGECL TNGECL also absorbed the functions of TEDA, which had previously served as the nodal renewable energy promotion agency of the state.

== Operations ==
TNGECL is responsible for development and management of renewable energy projects including hydroelectric stations, solar parks, wind farms and storage systems. The company also implements decentralised solar programmes and supports renewable energy procurement initiatives.

== Renewable Energy Installed Capacity ==
As of 2024, Renewable Energy Installed Capacity is 25,269.35 MW

Renewable energy installed capacity
Source	Installed capacity (MW)
Wind	11,398.31
Solar	10,655.95
Biomass	206.79
Co-generation (Bagasse)	684.40
Hydro	2,323.90
Total renewable energy	25,269.35

== Hydroelectric power stations ==
As of 2024, Tamil Nadu Green Energy Corporation Limited operates 47 hydroelectric power stations with a total installed capacity of 2,321.90 MW.

Hydroelectric power stations operated by TNGECL
Sl. No	Power station	District	Type	Units	Unit configuration	Installed capacity (MW)	Status
1	Mettur Dam PH	Salem	Irrigation hydro	4	4×12.5 MW	50	Operational
2	Mettur Tunnel PH	Salem	Irrigation hydro	4	4×50 MW	200	Operational
3	Lower Mettur Barrage PH-I	Salem	Irrigation hydro	2	2×15 MW	30	Operational
4	Lower Mettur Barrage PH-II	Erode	Irrigation hydro	2	2×15 MW	30	Operational
5	Lower Mettur Barrage PH-III	Erode	Irrigation hydro	2	2×15 MW	30	Operational
6	Lower Mettur Barrage PH-IV	Erode	Irrigation hydro	2	2×15 MW	30	Operational
7	Lower Bhavani Micro Hydel PH	Erode	Irrigation hydro	4	4×2 MW	8	Operational
8	Lower Bhavani Right Bank Canal PH	Erode	Irrigation hydro	2	2×4 MW	8	Operational
9	Bhavani Kattalai Barrage PH-I	Namakkal	Irrigation hydro	2	2×15 MW	30	Operational
10	Bhavani Kattalai Barrage PH-II	Erode	Irrigation hydro	2	2×15 MW	30	Operational
11	Bhavani Kattalai Barrage PH-III	Namakkal	Irrigation hydro	2	2×15 MW	30	Operational
12	Sathanur Dam PH	Tiruvannamalai	Irrigation hydro	1	1×7.5 MW	7.5	Operational
13	Bhavani Barrage PH-I	Coimbatore	Irrigation hydro	2	2×5 MW	10	Operational
14	Bhavani Barrage PH-II	Coimbatore	Irrigation hydro	2	2×5 MW	10	Operational
15	Sarkarpathy PH	Coimbatore	Irrigation hydro	1	1×30 MW	30	Operational
16	Sholayar PH-I	Coimbatore	Irrigation hydro	2	2×42 MW	84	Operational
17	Sholayar PH-II	Coimbatore	Irrigation hydro	1	1×25 MW	25	Operational
18	Kadamparai Pumped Storage PH	Coimbatore	Pumped storage hydro	4	4×100 MW	400	Operational
19	Aliyar Mini PH	Coimbatore	Irrigation hydro	2	2×1.25 MW	2.5	Operational
20	Aliyar PH	Coimbatore	Non-irrigation hydro	1	1×60 MW	60	Operational
21	Thirumurthy Mini PH	Tiruppur	Irrigation hydro	3	3×0.65 MW	1.95	Operational
22	Amaravathi PH	Tiruppur	Irrigation hydro	2	2×2 MW	4	Operational
23	Poonachi Mini PH	Coimbatore	Non-irrigation hydro	2	2×1 MW	2	Operational
24	Periyar PH	Theni	Irrigation hydro	4	4×42 MW	168	Operational
25	Papanasam PH	Tirunelveli	Irrigation hydro	4	4×8 MW	32	Operational
26	Servalar PH	Tirunelveli	Irrigation hydro	1	1×20 MW	20	Operational
27	Vaigai Small PH	Theni	Irrigation hydro	2	2×3 MW	6	Operational
28	Periyar-Vaigai Mini PH-I	Theni	Irrigation hydro	2	2×2 MW	4	Operational
29	Periyar-Vaigai Mini PH-II	Theni	Irrigation hydro	2	2×1.25 MW	2.5	Operational
30	Periyar-Vaigai Mini PH-III	Theni	Irrigation hydro	2	2×2 MW	4	Operational
31	Periyar-Vaigai Mini PH-IV	Theni	Irrigation hydro	2	2×1.25 MW	2.5	Operational
32	Suruliyar PH	Theni	Non-irrigation hydro	1	1×35 MW	35	Operational
33	Kundah PH-I	Nilgiris	Non-irrigation hydro	3	3×20 MW	60	Operational
34	Kundah PH-II	Nilgiris	Non-irrigation hydro	5	5×35 MW	175	Operational
35	Kundah PH-III	Coimbatore	Non-irrigation hydro	3	3×60 MW	180	Operational
36	Kundah PH-IV	Coimbatore	Non-irrigation hydro	2	2×50 MW	100	Operational
37	Kundah PH-V	Nilgiris	Non-irrigation hydro	2	2×20 MW	40	Operational
38	Kundah PH-VI	Nilgiris	Non-irrigation hydro	1	1×30 MW	30	Operational
39	Pykara PH	Nilgiris	Non-irrigation hydro	6	3x7 MW 1x11 MW 2x13.6 MW	59.2	Operational
40	PUSHEP	Nilgiris	Non-irrigation hydro	3	3×50 MW	150	Operational
41	Moyar PH	Nilgiris	Non-irrigation hydro	3	3×12 MW	36	Operational
42	Mukurthy Mini PH	Nilgiris	Non-irrigation hydro	2	2×0.35 MW	0.7	Operational
43	Pykara Micro PH	Nilgiris	Non-irrigation hydro	1	1×2 MW	2	Operational
44	Maravakandy Mini PH	Nilgiris	Non-irrigation hydro	1	1×0.75 MW	0.75	Operational
45	Perunchani PH	Kanyakumari	Irrigation hydro	2	2×0.65 MW	1.3	Operational
46	Kodayar PH-I	Kanyakumari	Non-irrigation hydro	1	1×60 MW	60	Operational
47	Kodayar PH-II	Kanyakumari	Non-irrigation hydro	1	1×40 MW	40	Operational

== Upcoming hydroelectric projects ==
Upcoming hydroelectric and pumped storage projects of Tamil Nadu Green Energy Corporation Limited
Sl. No	Project	District	Type	Unit configuration	Installed capacity (MW)	Estimated cost (₹ crore)	Development mode	Status	Expected commissioning
1	Kollimalai Hydroelectric Project	Namakkal	Conventional hydro	1 × 20 MW	20	591.20	State sector	Under construction (67% progress)	2025–26
2	Kundah Pumped Storage Project	Nilgiris	Pumped storage hydro	4 × 125 MW	500	3,523.37	State sector	Under construction	2025–26
3	Upper Bhavani Pumped Storage Project	Nilgiris	Pumped storage hydro	4 × 250 MW	1000	3,905	Joint venture (NTECL)	Planned	TBA
4	Sandy Nalla Pumped Storage Project	Nilgiris	Pumped storage hydro	4 × 300 MW	1200	—	PPP mode	Proposed	TBA
5	Sigur Pumped Storage Project	Nilgiris	Pumped storage hydro	4 × 200 MW	800	—	PPP mode	Proposed	TBA
6	Vellimalai Pumped Storage Project	Kanyakumari	Pumped storage hydro	4 × 275 MW	1100	—	PPP mode	Proposed	TBA
7	Kodayar Pumped Storage Project	Kanyakumari	Pumped storage hydro	6 × 250 MW	1500	10,838	PPP mode	DPR preparation	TBA
8	Manalar Pumped Storage Project	Theni	Pumped storage hydro	6 × 200 MW	1200	9,887	PPP mode	DPR preparation	TBA
9	Aliyar Pumped Storage Project	Coimbatore	Pumped storage hydro	4 × 175 MW	700	2,504	PPP mode	DPR preparation	TBA
10	Palar–Porathalar Pumped Storage Project	Dindigul	Pumped storage hydro	4 × 275 MW	1100	4,254	PPP mode	DPR preparation	TBA
11	Manjalar Pumped Storage Project	Theni	Pumped storage hydro	2 × 250 MW	500	2,464	PPP mode	DPR preparation	TBA
12	Sillahalla Stage-II Pumped Storage Project	Nilgiris	Pumped storage hydro	4 × 250 MW	1000	4,918	PPP mode	DPR preparation	TBA
13	Chattar Pumped Storage Project	Kanyakumari	Pumped storage hydro	4 × 275 MW	1100	4,707	PPP mode	DPR preparation	TBA
14	Karaiyar Pumped Storage Project	Tirunelveli	Pumped storage hydro	4 × 250 MW	1000	4,589	PPP mode	DPR preparation	TBA
15	Mettur Pumped Storage Project	Salem	Pumped storage hydro	4 × 250 MW	1000	4,434	PPP mode	DPR preparation	TBA
16	Athur Pumped Storage Project	Dindigul	Pumped storage hydro	2 × 150 MW	300	1,718	PPP mode	DPR preparation	TBA
17	Sillahalla Stage-I Pumped Storage Project	Nilgiris	Pumped storage hydro	4 × 250 MW	1000	4,952	State sector	DPR preparation	TBA

== See also ==
- Tamil Nadu Electricity Board
- Tamil Nadu Power Generation Corporation Limited
- Tamil Nadu Power Distribution Corporation Limited
- Tamil Nadu Transmission Corporation Limited
- Renewable energy in India
