= Udangudi Super Critical Thermal Power Station =

Coal-fired thermal power station in Tamil Nadu, India

- Country: India
- Location: Udangudi, Thoothukudi district, Tamil Nadu
- Coordinates: 8.44315635°N 78.06960678°E
- Status: Operational
- Construction began: 2017
- Commission date: 13 March 2026 (Unit 1)
- Construction cost: Units 1 ₹13,077 crore (US$1.4 billion)
- Owner: Tamil Nadu Power Generation Corporation Limited (TNPGCL)
- Operator: TNPGCL

Thermal power station
- Primary fuel: Bituminous coal

Power generation
- Units operational: 2
- Units planned: 4
- Nameplate capacity: 1,320 MW

The Udangudi Super Critical Thermal Power Station is a 1,320 MW coal-fired thermal power plant under construction at Udangudi in Thoothukudi district of Tamil Nadu State. The project is being developed by the Tamil Nadu Power Generation Corporation Limited, formerly part of Tamil Nadu Generation and Distribution Corporation. The first unit was commissioned on 13 March 2025.

== Location ==
The power station is located near the coastal town of Udangudi close to Tiruchendur in Thoothukudi district. The coastal location allows transportation of coal through dedicated port and jetty infrastructure.

== Technical specifications ==
Unit I of the project consists of two supercritical generating units of 660 MW each with a total installed capacity of 1,320 MW.

Supercritical technology operates at higher temperature and pressure compared to conventional thermal plants, resulting in improved efficiency and lower coal consumption per unit of electricity generated.

Major infrastructure of the project includes:

- Boiler, turbine and generator systems
- Coal handling plant
- Cooling towers
- Ash handling systems
- Switchyard facilities
- Seawater intake systems

== History ==
The Udangudi thermal power project was initially conceived as a joint venture involving Bharat Heavy Electricals Limited and Tamil Nadu Electricity Board. Later the project was taken up by TANGEDCO and subsequently transferred to TNPGCL after restructuring of the state power utilities.

Construction began around 2017–2018. The project experienced delays due to contractual disputes and the COVID-19 pandemic.

The first generating unit achieved grid synchronisation during the March 2026 as part of the commissioning process.

== Coal jetty and fuel logistics ==
A dedicated coal jetty has been developed as part of the Udangudi project to facilitate the import of coal required for power generation. The jetty infrastructure includes a marine unloading facility, conveyor systems and coal handling arrangements connecting the jetty directly to the power plant.

== Cost ==
The estimated cost of Unit I of the project is approximately ₹13,000 crore.

== Future expansion ==
The Power Station has been planned in multiple phases to meet the growing electricity demand of Tamil Nadu. The project is being implemented in three Unit of 2x660 MW supercritical units, with additional phases proposed to utilise common infrastructure and expand the total generating capacity.

Phase	Units	Capacity (MW)	Total capacity (MW)	Status
Phase I	2 × 660 MW	1,320 MW	1,320 MW	Commissioning
Phase II	2 × 660 MW	1,320 MW	1,320 MW	Planned
Phase III	2 × 660 MW	1,320 MW	1,320 MW	Planned

== See also ==
- List of power stations in India
- Tamil Nadu Electricity Board
- Tamil Nadu Generation and Distribution Corporation
