= Kamarajar Port =

- Interactive map of Kamarajar Port

Location
- Country: India
- Location: Athipattu Pudunagar, Ennore, Chennai
- Coordinates: 13.25164°N 80.32683°E
- UN/LOCODE: IN ENR

Details
- Opened: 2001
- Operated by: Kamarajar Port Limited
- Owned by: Kamarajar Port Limited
- Type of Harbor: Seaport (Artificial)
- No. of berths: 8
- Employees: 96 (2023–24)
- Chairman and Managing Director: Sunil Paliwal, IAS
- Main trades: Thermal Coal, Automobiles, Project Cargo, LPG, POL, Chemical, other liquids, other bulk and rock mineral products
- UN/LOCODE: INENR

Statistics
- Annual cargo tonnage: ▲45.28 million (2023–24)
- Annual container volume: ▲671,393 TEU (2023–24)
- Annual revenue: ▲₹1,081.44 crore (US$120 million) (2023–24)
- Net income: ▲₹495.68 crore (US$53 million) (2023–24)
- Vessels handled: 967 (2023–24)
- Website http://www.kamarajarport.in/

Kamarajar Port, also known as Ennore Port, is located on the Coromandel Coast, Chennai about 18 km north of Chennai Port. It is the 12th major port of India, and the first port in India which is a public company. The Kamarajar Port Limited is the only corporatised major port and is registered as a company. Chennai Port Trust acquired around 67% stake of Centre in the Kamarajar Port Limited on 27 March 2020. The remaining 23 percent was already held by the Chennai Port Trust.

The port has been able to attract an investment of ₹26,000 million by private entrepreneurs on various terminals and harbour craft. Kamarajar Port Limited, designed as Asia's energy port, is the first corporatised port in India and has only 86 employees. Envisaged being a satellite port to decongest and improve the environmental quality at the bustling Chennai Port, Kamarajar Port Limited is evolving itself into a full-fledged port with the capacity to handle a wide range of products. With a permissible draught of 13.5 m, the port handled a total volume of 11.01 million tonnes in 2010–11, up by 2.86 per cent from the previous year.

== History ==
Ennore Port was originally conceived as a satellite port to the Chennai Port, primarily to handle thermal coal to meet the requirement of Tamil Nadu Electricity Board (TNEB), and was endowed with large chunks of land (about 2,000 acres). The scope was expanded taking into account subsequent developments such as the plan of Government of Tamil Nadu to set up a 1,880 mW LNG power project in association with a private consortium, a large petrochemical park and a naphtha cracker plant. Ennore Port was commissioned by the then Prime Minister of India Atal Bihari Vajpayee on 1 February 2001. The port was set up under the Companies Act, keeping it outside the scope of the Tariff Authority for Major Ports, the tariff regulator for 11 of the 12 ports owned by the Indian government. The port was declared as a major port under the Indian Ports Act, 1908 in March 1999 and incorporated as the Ennore Port Limited under the Companies Act, 1956 in October 1999. Commercial operations commenced with Handymax geared vessels for unloading of thermal coal on 22 June 2001. With the deployment of self-unloading and gearless vessels of 65,000/77,000 dead weight tonnage (DWT), full-fledged operations were started in December 2002.

With the acquisition of about 440 hectares of land, the first phase of the port consisted of the construction of a coal jetty, a wharf and an entrance channel and related dredging operations. The main construction work included two berths for handling coal vessels up to 65,000 DWT, dredging for the approach channel and harbour basin, onshore civil works, navigational aids, and two breakwaters—4 km in the north side and 1 km in the south—close to the NCTPS and the Ennore Creek. In 2014, the port was officially renamed as Kamarajar Port.

== Location and geography ==
Ennore Port lies on the northeastern corner of the Chennai City of Tamil Nadu State on a flat coastal plain known as the Eastern Coastal Plains. It is located on the east coast of the Indian peninsula known as the Coromandel Coast in the Bay of Bengal and is situated 2.6 km north of the Ennore Creek. Nearby railway station is Athipattu Pudunagar. Being coastal and situated on the thermal equator zone, the port experiences minimal variations in seasonal temperature ranging from a maximum of 38–42 °C in summer to a minimum of 18–20 °C in winter. The weather is hot and humid for most of the year, and the region features a tropical wet and dry climate. The northeast monsoon winds brings seasonal rainfall in the region from September to December, and occasionally cyclones. The annual rainfall in the region is about 1400 mm (55 in). The most prevailing winds are the southwesterly between April and October and the northeasterly during the rest of the year. The port is located on a region that falls under Seismic Zone III indicating a moderate risk of earthquake. The Ennore Creek in the south separates the port from the town of Ennore.

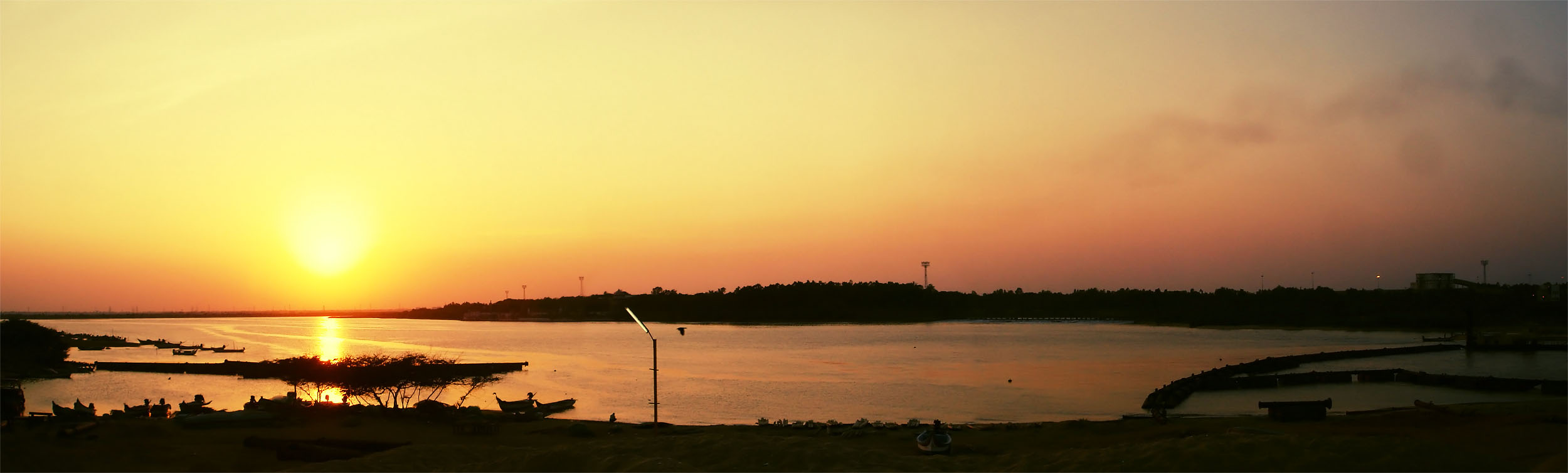
Ennore Creek

== Operations ==
	Nos.
Port crafts
Tugs (40 tonne Bollard pull)	3 nos.
Pilot launches	2 nos.
Mooring launches	3 nos.
High-speed patrol boat	1 no.
Navigational aids
Fairway buoy	1 no.
Channel-marking buoy	6 nos.
Transit light towers	2 nos.
Equipment profile (installed by TNEB over coal wharf)
Conveyors (4000 TPH each)	2 nos.
Unloading equipments: Shore-based gantry-type grab (2000 TPH each)	2 nos.
Mobile Hopper (to receive coal from crane hopper self-unloading ship at the rate of 4000 TPH)	1 no.
Temporary hoppers (to receive coal from Handymax geared vessels)	6 nos.

Commissioned in 2001 and operating on a landlord port concept, it is outsourcing all services required for operation and maintenance, and new terminals are being developed with the participation of the private sector. During the year of 2010–11, it handled a total cargo of 11.01 million tons. The port has effectively taken over all the ore movement from the Chennai Port. By 2016, the port is expected to have the capacity to handle over 80 million tons of cargo and its coal-handling capacity is expected to be about 43 million tons. The port is equipped to handle 16 million tonnes of coal per year from its two dedicated coal berths with 15 m alongside depth and staffed by TNEB, while its third berth promoted by Chettinad International Coal Terminal, is a common user facility that can handle 8 million tonnes per annum.

Year	Cargo (in million tonnes)
2001–02	3.401 (from June 2001)
2002–03	8.485
2003–04	9.277
2004–05	9.479
2005–06	9.168
2006–07	10.71
2007–08	11.56
2008–09	11.50
2009–10	10.703
2010–11	11.01
2015–16	32.21
2016–17	30.02
2017–18	30.45
2018–19	34.50

The approach channel to the port is 3,775 m long. The minimum depth of the entrance channel is 16 m below chart datum (BCD) and the minimum width is 250 m. The turning basin is 600 m in diameter with a minimum depth of 15.5 m BCD. The breakwaters in the port are of rubble-mound type with accropode armour protection. The northern breakwater measures 3,080 m and the southern breakwater measures 1,070 m.

The port has adequate road and rail links. The Port has obtained an in-principle approval from Southern Railways for providing rail connectivity to coal and iron ore stackyards. Ennore Port Limited (EPL) is also developing an 8-lane Northern Express Road, which would link the port with the National Highway No. 5. It has a 560-metre (1,840 ft)-long coal wharf for berthing two Panamax-size vessels and fully mechanised systems for handling 16 million tons of cargo a year. Designed as a world-class port, with two breakwaters—one in the north measuring 3,080 m (10,100 ft) and the other in the south measuring 1,070 m (3,510 ft) with a depth of 15 m (49 ft)—it has the capacity to develop 22 berths for handling a variety of bulk, liquid, and container cargo. The port is an artificial port with features including all-weather, round-the-clock operations and transport interface.

According to the Maritime Agenda 2010–20, the port traffic is projected to increase to 67.44 million tonnes in 2016–17 and 71.54 million tonnes in 2019–20. Against this projected traffic growth, the port's capacity is expected to increase from the existing 16 million tonnes (as on 31 March 2010) to 73 million tonnes in 2016–17. The major economic activities through which traffic and capacity will rise are development of LNG and coal terminals and expansion of outer harbour stage II and development of container terminal, respectively. The target set for the port for 2010–11 is 13.20 million tonnes against a target of 12.45 million tonnes during the previous fiscal.

During 2010–11, the port handled a total of 294 vessels, including 184 dry bulk, 87 liquid bulk, 22 break bulk and 1 container vessels against 273 vessels in 2009–10, registering a 7.69% increase.

Car exports took place through the port for the first time in 2010–11. A total of 54,264 cars were exported through the port by Renault-Nissan Automotive India Pvt. Ltd.

The Marine Liquid Terminal constructed at a cost of ₹ 2,500 million is already operational since January 2009.

Being a corporate port, Ennore Port is the only major port in the country paying dividend to the government. During the year 2010–11, the port reported a post-tax profit of ₹ 555.8 million as against ₹ 486.6 million in the previous year. The operating ratio of the port is the lowest among all the major ports in India at 33.56 per cent during 2010–11.

Cargo handled by Ennore Port (in million tonnes):

Commodity	2007–08	2008–09
Thermal coal	9.05	9.71
Iron ore	2.19	1.11
Petroleum, oil and lubricants (POL) (including STS)	0.32	0.68
Total	11.56	11.50

As of 2017, the port handled more than 200,000 cars, chiefly by Nissan and Ford, outnumbering the neighbouring Chennai Port.

== Terminals ==
The Chettinad International Coal Terminal (CICTL), the private terminal at the port capable of handling Panamax ships, commenced operations in January 2011 and is targeting to handle nearly 5 million tonnes of coal/coke by current financial year ending 31 March 2012. The terminal was completed with equipments and conveyor systems, yard and evacuations systems with capacity to handle 8 million tonnes of coal/coke annually at project outlay of about ₹ 4,000 million.

The Ennore Container Terminal (ECT), also known as the Bay of Bengal Gateway Terminal, will have an eventual planned annual capacity of 2.4 million TEUs and will be capable of handling three mainline vessels simultaneously. The construction is expected to begin by end of 2011 at a cost of £207 million, allowing the first ships to be handled in 2013. The terminal for 6,000-to-8,000 TEU vessels will have a quay length of 1,000 m with 15 m water depth at the berths and will be able to handle three container vessels of up to 8,000 TEUs simultaneously.

Berth	Capacity (MTPA)	Max permissible length (m)	Max permissible draught (m)	Type of cargo	Size (DWT)	Type of vessels
Coal Berth 1 (CB1)	8	240	13.5	Thermal coal	65,000–77,000	Handymax and Panamax size vessels (both geared & gearless)
Coal Berth 2 (CB2)	4	240	13.5	Thermal coal	65,000–77,000	Handymax and Panamax size vessels (geared vessels only)
Marine Liquid Terminal 1 (MLT1)	3	260	13.5	POL/chemicals	Up to 1,50,000	
Chettinad International Coal Terminal (CICT)	8	260	13.5	Coal (other than TNEB)	Up to 1,50,000	

The Indian Oil Corporation Ltd's (IOC) Liquid Natural Gas (LNG) import terminal at the port, which began in November 2015, is scheduled to open in October 2018. Built at a cost of ₹ 51,510 million, it has a capacity of 5 million tonnes per annum, with provisions to increase it to 6 million tonnes without any addition and to 10 million tonnes by the addition of two more tanks. At the initial stages, the plant would function at 20 to 25 percent of its capacity, supplying natural gas to industries in the Manali industrial area, including Madras Fertilizers Ltd., Chennai Petroleum Corporation and Tamil Nadu Petroproducts. Gas will reach the terminal in liquid form in order to ease transportation and it will be re-gassified before supplying it through pipelines to fertilizer industries to be used as gas-based feedstock, replacing naphtha. In would also be used to generate power or run furnace in other industries.

== Connectivity ==
=== Road link ===
The highway authority is implementing a project for construction of 30.1 km (18.7 mi) segment of Chennai-Ennore Port connectivity. Announced by the Tamil Nadu Government in 1998, the cost of the Chennai-Ennore Port Road Connectivity project, earlier called Ennore-Manali Road Improvement Project, has escalated by four times to ₹ 6,000 million. The project is to enable free flow of truck traffic from and to the Chennai port in North Chennai. The Ennore Port handles over 5,000 containers a day and trucks need to take this Ennore-Manali road for entry and exit to the port. The project is still in the "tendering" stage—previous tenders were cancelled for various reasons.

The project will commence in January 2011 and will be completed in 2 years.

The Union Government has decided to lay a 21.1-kilometre (13.1 mi)-long 4-laned national highway (port corridor) connecting Ennore with Thacchur at a cost of ₹ 3,740 million. The road runs from the northern gate of Ennore port to Panchetti near Thatchur on National Highway 5. The proposed road would provide direct access to NH 5 from the Ennore port and the upcoming port of L&T. The road between the Ennore port and Panchetti would have its alignment along nine villages, including Kattupalli, Ariyanvoyal, Nallur, Vellampakkam and Vannivakkam. Tiruvottiyur-Ponneri-Panchetti link road to be created would cover the villages of Kollatur, Nandiambakkam and Vallur.

L&T Ship Building Ltd is likely to form a joint venture with Ennore Port and the Tamil Nadu Industrial Development Corporation (TIDCO), to build a 25.5-km road that would connect Ennore and Kattupalli ports. The road project is estimated to cost ₹ 3,600 million. To implement the road project some 400 acres would need to be acquired.

=== Rail link ===
The port has 6-km-long rail link connecting the coal and iron ore stack yards and the North Chennai Thermal Power Station with Athipattu and Athipattu-Pudhunagar railway stations. A 26 km Y-shaped single-track northern link from the port to the Anuppampattu railway station, connecting the port with the Chennai-Gudur mainline, was proposed in 2012 at an estimated cost of ₹ 1,700 million. The link will have two arms at the port end, with one arm culminating at coal and iron ore stack yards and the other culminating at the upcoming container terminals. The link would eventually upgraded to a dual-track one. In-principle approval from the Indian Railways was obtained in September 2013.

Rail connectivity project works to link coal and iron ore stackyards with Athipattu station on the Chennai–Vijayawada mainline are under the implementation at a cost of ₹ 516 million. Meanwhile, the coal and iron ore stackyards are being serviced through a new-line operationalised in November 2010.

== Awards ==
Ennore Port has been conferred with the "memorandum of excellence certificate" by the Government of India for 2008–09. It is the second consecutive year that the port has been selected for the honour. The union ministry of heavy industries and public enterprises had granted MoU excellence awards and certificates for achieving "excellent" MoU rating.

Government of India has accorded Category-I Mini Ratna status to Ennore Port Limited.

== The future ==
The Planning Commission has approved a rail connectivity for Ennore Port to the coal, iron and container terminals. There is a US$230-million expansion for the port in progress. An iron ore terminal is currently in the process of construction by PSA Sical. The terminal will have a capacity for 12 million tonnes of cargo per year, expandable to 15/20 million tonnes per year. Facilities include a jetty, ship loader, mechanised handling system with conveyor, storage, and a wagon unloading system. The port is expanding its cargo handling capacity to 87 million tonnes a year in the next 5 years as mandated by the Union Government, according to a press release from Ennore Port Ltd.

Terminal	Capacity (million tonnes per annum)	Estimated cost (in million)	Alongside depth	Jetty length	Development & operation	Date of commissioning	Status
Iron ore terminal	12.0 (6.0 in Phase I and 6.0 in Phase II)	₹ 4,800 (₹ 3,600 in Phase I and ₹ 1,200 in Phase II)	15 m BCD (Phase I) (18 m depth deepening in progress)	347.5 m	M/s SICAL Iron ore Terminals Ltd (Consortium of SICAL Logistics Ltd., MMTC Ltd. and L&T IDP Ltd.)	28 January 2011	Completed
Coal terminal	8.0	₹ 3,991.3	15 m BCD	325 m	M/s Chettinad International Coal Terminal (P) Ltd. (Consortium of SICL, Portia Management Services Ltd. and Navayuga Engineering Ltd.)	28 January 2011	Completed
General cargo berth	0.5 (plus 200,000 cars per annum)	₹ 1,100	12 m BCD	250 m		28 January 2011	Completed
Marine liquid terminal	3.0	₹ 2,500	15 m BCD	360 m	Ennore Tank Terminal Pvt. Ltd.(Consortium of IMC Pvt. Ltd. and L&T Ltd.)	January 2009	Completed
Container terminal (Phase I)	18.0 (1.5 million TEUs)	₹ 14,070	15 m BCD	1,000 m	Bay of Bengal Gateway Terminal Pvt. Ltd.	2013–2014	Ongoing
LNG terminal	5.0	Approx. ₹ 27,000 (including regassification plant)	15 m BCD	300 m	IOCL		Planned
Coal berth III for TNEB	9.0		15 m BCD	290 m	Developed by Ennore Port and operated by TNEB		Planned

Though the port started as a dirty port to take over the coal and ore handling from the Chennai Port, it has suggested a proposal for a modern container terminal. The facility would have a capacity to handle 1.5 million TEUs (18 million tonnes). The port has started competing with the Chennai Port on handling of container traffic. Recently, the Nissan-Renault car manufacturing company picked it over the Chennai Port for the car exports. To facilitate this, a US$320-million expansion has been approved and will commence by March 2009. The port also won Toyota for its exports of cars manufactured near Bangalore. Mitsui is working on creating an auto yard in the port to facilitate the exports. The port is also planning to build a four-lane road linking the new terminal with the national highway (NH-5).

Construction of a car export terminal with a capacity of handling 400,000 cars annually at the port has been completed, which Japanese car-maker Nissan Motors will use to export 180,000 cars per year once fully executed, though exports are expected to commence from 28 January 2011. Construction of the terminal has cost ₹ 1,200 million and the facilities will include a berth, a 12-m draft after dredging of the basin and a parking yard of 175,000 sq.m. A coal terminal and iron ore terminal are also being developed at a total investment of ₹ 8,800 million. The coal terminal, constructed at a cost of ₹ 4,000 million with a capacity to handle 8 million tonnes of coal, is expected to commence on 28 January 2011. The iron ore terminal was constructed at a cost of ₹ 4,800 million with a capacity to handle 12 million tonnes annually and was opened in January 2011 but is yet to start commercial operations. However, since the Supreme Court put a blanket ban in July 2011 on mining in the mineral-rich Bellary-Hospet belt in Karnataka, on which the terminal is totally dependent on, to check environmental damage arising from rampant illegal mining, Sical Logistics is seeking to handle diversified cargo. The container terminal will be built at a cost of ₹ 14,070 million (US$312 million) with an annual capacity of 1.5 million TEU. Work on the new Ennore Container Terminal is scheduled to take 33 months and it is expected to be operational by the end of 2013. The concession will be awarded on a build, operate and transfer (BOT) basis for a period of 30 years. The terminal will have a quay length of 1,000 m and an estimated throughput of 1.5 million TEUs annually. The terminal will provide 15-m water depth at the berths and will be able to handle three container vessels of up to 8,000 TEUs simultaneously.

The port is awaiting the Central Government's permission to start a capital dredging work. There is a special economic zone (SEZ) coming up near the port covering 3,000 acres (12 km^{2}) to take advantage of the proximity to the port. It is for engineering, information technology, auto components, garments and leather products. It would have container freight station facilities and free trade warehousing zone.

With the inauguration of three new terminals to handle non-TNEB coal, iron ore and cars in 2010, the installed capacity of the port had doubled from 15 million tonnes to 30 million tonnes.

A ₹ 1,700-million capital dredging project to create necessary depths to handle larger vessels was commenced at the port on 26 February 2011. With this, the port's channel depth has been increased from 16 m CD to 18 m CD.

In December 2011, Manali Petrochemicals Ltd entered into an agreement to set up storage and handling facility at the port for bulk import of propylene oxide, a major input for the derivative plants of the company. The facility is expected to be ready in about a year.

As of 2013, Chennai Petroleum Corporation Limited (CPCL) is considering setting up a single buoy mooring (SBM) at the Port, estimated to cost in excess of ₹ 12,000 million, as one of the options available for transporting crude, which would help the company bring in very large crude carriers.

== Environmental threats and illegal actions ==
Ennore Creek is located adjacent to the Ennore Port. It is part of a lagoon ecosystem that plays a vital role in balancing the coastal ecosystem in the area. Ennore Creek drains two important rivers, Kosasthalaiyar in the South and Aranaiyar in the North into the Bay of Bengal through the Ennore Estuary. The creek prevents floods and storm surges and is essential to secure ground water reservoirs from saltwater intrusion. The port poses a huge threat to the creek. Shorelines changes have led to the closure of one of the two creek mouths and are assumed to have taken place due to the construction of the port. This makes it more difficult for water to drain from the creek into the Bay of Bengal and increases the risk of flooding in the area. Additionally the Kamarajar Port Limited is dumping dredged material into the Ennore Creek, a violation of the Coastal Regulation Zone Rules and the Water Act. The dumped material hinders and blocks the water flow of the creek, which is crucial to be free of encroachments in case of floods. Recently the Tamil Nadu Pollution Control Board issued a notice to Kamarajar port instructing the port to remove the illegally dumped materials.

== See also ==
- Chennai Port
- Kattupalli Shipyard
- Ports in India
- 2017 Ennore oil spill
