= Vallur Thermal Power Station =

Coal-fired power station in Tamil Nadu

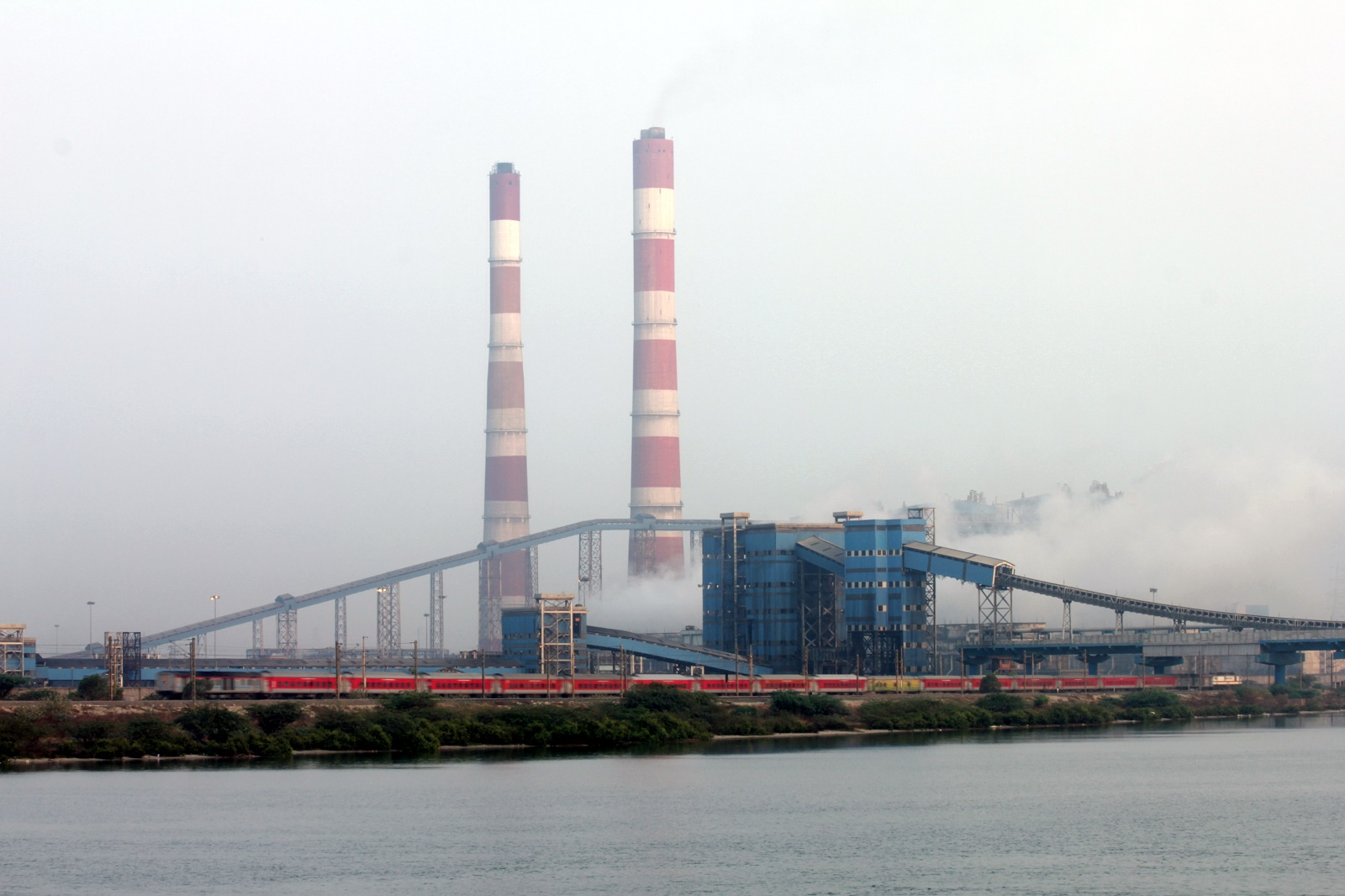
- Vallur Thermal Power Plant as viewed from new Ennore Creek road bridge
- Country: India
- Location: Vallur, Chennai
- Coordinates: 13°14′2″N 80°18′21″E
- Status: Operational
- Construction began: September 2007
- Commission date: Unit 1: March 2012; Unit 2: February 2013; Unit 3: February 2014
- Construction cost: ₹91.93 billion
- Owners: NTPC Limited and TNPGCL
- Operator: NTPC Tamil Nadu Energy Company Limited

Thermal power station
- Primary fuel: Coal

Power generation
- Units operational: 3 x 500 megawatts (670,000 hp)
- Nameplate capacity: 1,500 megawatts (2,000,000 hp)

External links
- Commons: Related media on Commons

Vallur Thermal Power Station is a power plant located in Vallur, Chennai, Thiruvallur district, India. The power plant is operated by NTPC Tamil Nadu Energy Company Limited, a joint venture between NTPC Limited and Tamil Nadu Power Generation Corporation Limited and has three units with 500 MW each.

In January 2014, the units in the power plant achieved a record generation of 24.09 million units (kWh) of electricity. The project adds nearly 24 million units a day to the grid. Tamil Nadu is the major beneficiary of power generated from this facility (about 750 MW), while some of it is supplied to Andhra Pradesh, Karnataka, Kerala, and Puducherry.

The plant will consume 4.62 megatonnes (4,550,000 long tons; 5,090,000 short tons) of coal a year. Coal for the plant will be brought from Orissa through ship to Ennore Port, from where it will be transported by pipe conveyor crossing Ennore Creek.

== Location ==
The power plant is located on a triangular tract of land between Ennore Creek and Athipattu Pudhunagar railway station, southwest of Ennore Port, Chennai.

== Construction ==
The plant was established under the mega power project policy. The erstwhile Tamil Nadu Electricity Board (TNEB) and the NTPC, in a joint venture, formed the NTPC Tamil Nadu Energy Company Limited. The foundation stone for the Vallur thermal plant was laid on 5 September 2007, with an estimated cost of ₹80 billion (€100 million), and the ₹19,900-million main plant package to supply steam generators and turbine for stage I was awarded to Bharat Heavy Electricals Limited (BHEL), a state-run power equipments manufacturer, on 13 August 2007. The projected was constructed in two phases: phase I with two 500 MW units at a cost of ₹54 billion and phase II with one 500 MW unit at a cost of ₹30 billion. Initially expected to be operational by 2010, the project was delayed due to the late implementation of the coal-handling facility established by the BHEL. Erection of the boiler column began on 5 January 2009.

In September 2009, the ₹130 million contract to supply units for Vallur was given to BHEL, which supplied and installed steam generator and steam turbine packages. BHEL was responsible for the design, engineering manufacture, supply, erection and commissioning of the steam generators, turbine generators, electrostatic precipitators and associated auxiliaries, and controls and instrumentation systems in the plant.

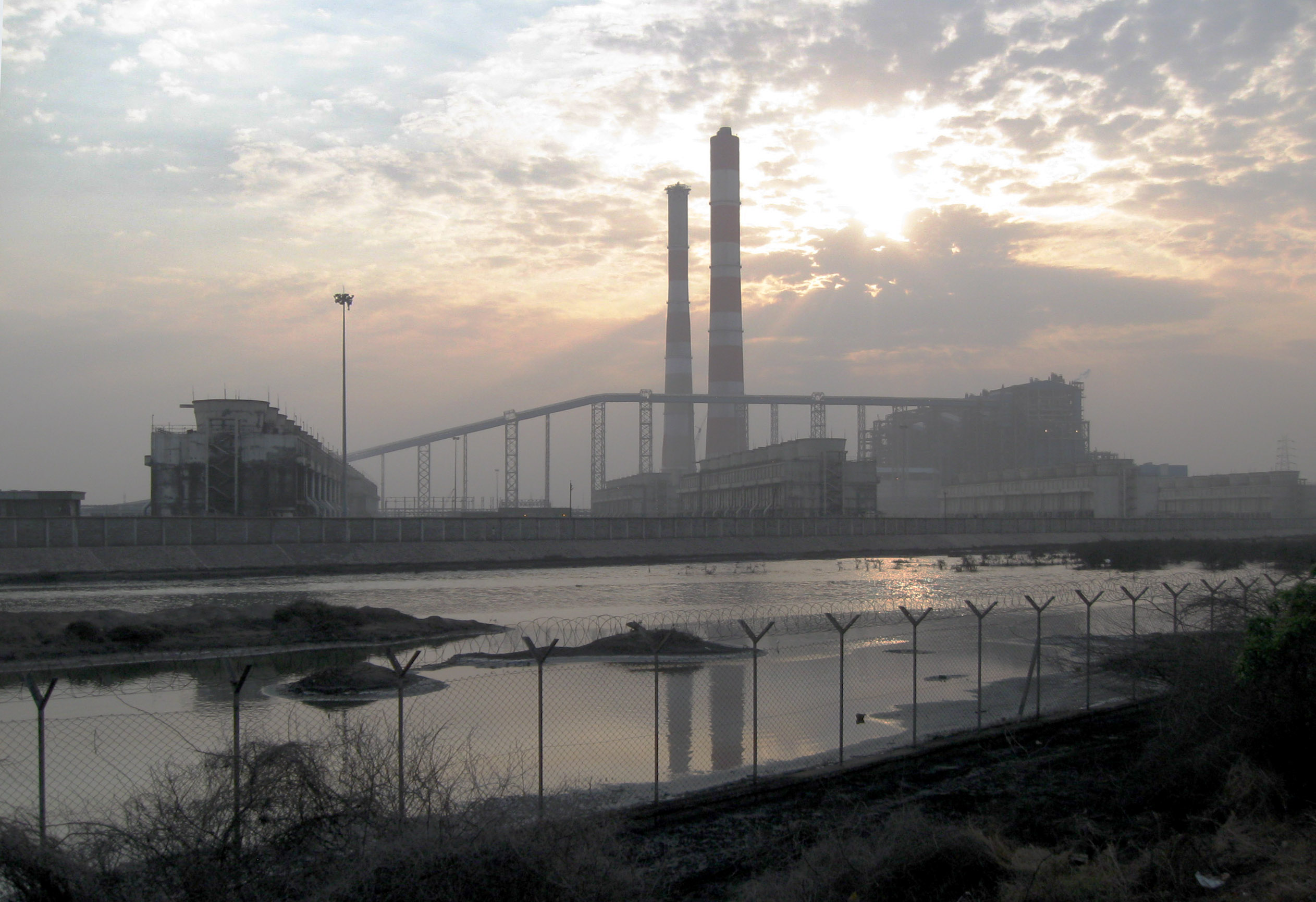
NTECL Power Plant in Vallur

The 216-tonne (213-long-ton; 238-short-ton) boiler drum of Unit I was erected in June 2010. Unit I was commissioned in March 2012 but operating at full capacity was delayed further due to problems with coal-handling facilities. Independent works on phase II began in 2010.

The first, second and third units were synchronised with the grid on 9 March 2012, 26 February 2013 and 28 February 2014, respectively. The total cost of the project without IDC was ₹91,930 million. The plant commenced its commercial operation on 29 November 2012, with the operation of its first unit. The second unit commenced its commercial operations on 25 August 2013, while that of the third unit was commenced on 28 February 2014.

== Cost and Finance ==
The cost of phase I was ₹54 billion ($1.15 billion) and that of phase II was ₹30 billion ($639 million). The debt equity ratio of the project is 7:3. The Rural Electrification Corporation (REC) sanctioned ₹38 billion ($809 million) to meet the entire debt portion of the project. REC advanced a loan of ₹21 billion ($447 million) for the second phase in April 2010.

== Technology and operations ==
The boiler systems at the plant consists of single- or two-pass type, with front/rear/side mill layout, which can have single/bi-drum arrangement with natural or controlled circulation. There is constant or sliding pressure operation, and hot or cold primary air systems. Steam turbine operates at a speeds of 3,000 rpm. The main steam is at 130–250 bars (13,000–25,000 kPa) at 500–540 °C (930–1,000 °F). Steam reheat is at 30–70 bars (3,000–7,000 kPa) and 500–600 °C (930–1,100 °F). The back pressure is between 20 and 300 millibars (20 and 300 hPa).

The plant has six induced draft cooling towers (IDCTs), which have a capacity of 30,000 cubic metres per hour (1,100,000 cu ft/h) with nine cells of 14 by 21 metres (46 ft × 69 ft) each. The IDCTs use seawater, which is drawn from the intake channel of North Chennai Thermal Power Station, and fresh water requirement is met from a desalination plant. The plant has adopted closed cycle re-circulating type cooling water system for its operations.

The coal conveyor system in the plant includes a 4.4-kilometre (2.7 mi)-long pipe conveyor with a capacity of 4,000 tonnes per hour (150,000 lb/min), which is the world's largest pipe conveyor.

The plant requires 13,400 tonnes (13,200 long tons; 14,800 short tons) of coal per day. Domestic coalfields supply 53 percent of the need, and the remainder through coal imports.

=== Installed capacity ===
Following is the unit-wise capacity of the 1,500 megawatts (2,000,000 hp) plant.

Stage	Unit number	Installed capacity (MW)	Date of commissioning	Status
Stage I	1	500	29 November 2012	Running
Stage I	2	500	25 August 2013	Running
Stage I	3	500	28 February 2014	Running

The share of Tamil Nadu would be 375 megawatts (503,000 hp) from each of the three units in the plant.

== Environmental impact ==
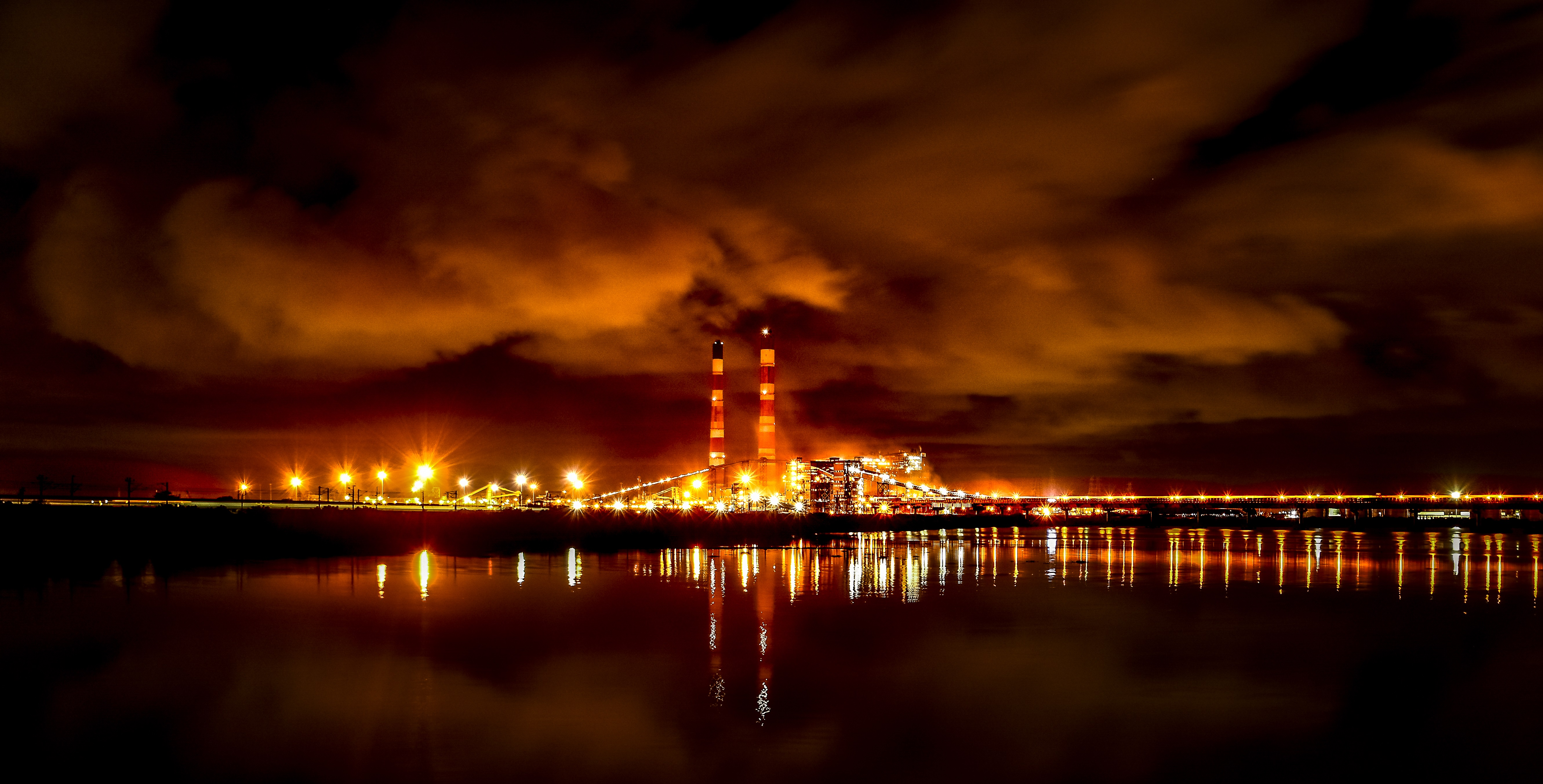
NTPC Tamil Nadu Energy Station at night

The Vallur Thermal Power Station is an environmentally friendly and non-polluting plant.

== See also ==
- List of power stations in India
