= Mettur Thermal Power Station =

Power station in Tamil Nadu, India

Mettur Thermal Power system
- Location of the Mettur Thermal Power Station in Tamil Nadu
- Country: India
- Location: Salem, Tamil Nadu
- Coordinates: 11°46′19″N 77°48′49″E
- Status: Operational
- Commission date: Unit 1: 7 January 1987; Unit 2: 1 December 1987; Unit 3: 22 March 1989; Unit 4: 27 March 1990; Unit 5: 12 October 2013
- Operator: Tamil Nadu Power Generation Corporation Limited

Thermal power station
- Primary fuel: Bituminous coal

Power generation
- Units operational: 4 x 210 MW, 1 x 600 MW
- Nameplate capacity: 1,440 MW

The Mettur Thermal Power Station is a coal-fired electric power station located in [Thoppur-Mettur Dam-Bhavani-Erode Rd, Mettur, Tamil Nadu 636406] Salem district of Tamil Nadu. It is operated by Tamil Nadu Power Generation Corporation Limited. The power station was commissioned during various periods from 1987 and this is the first inland thermal Power Station of Tamil Nadu Power Generation Corporation Limited.The coal from Mahanadi Coalfields Limited (Talcher and Ib Valley) and Eastern Coalfields Limited (Raniganj and Mugma) are transported to the load ports of Paradip (Orissa), Vizag (Andhra Pradesh) and Haldia (West Bengal). Thereafter the coal is transported to the discharge ports of Ennore and Tuticorin by ships. From Ennore Port the coal is transported again through rail to Ennore Thermal Power Station and Mettur Thermal Power Station.

BGR Energy Systems Ltd was the EPC contractor for 600 MW unit 5 of the power plant.

== Plants ==
| Unit | cost in Crores Rs | Continuous running in days | Capacity(M.W) | Date of Commissioning |
|---|---|---|---|---|
| I | 384.30 | 227 days | 210 | 7 January 1987 |
| II | 384.30 | 205 days | 210 | 12 January 1987 |
| III | 351.76 | 272 days | 210 | 22 March 1989 |
| IV | 351.76 | 311 days | 210 | 27 March 1990 |
| V | 398.00 | 193 days | 600 | 12 October 2013 |
