= 2017 Ennore oil spill =

Oil spill in India

2017 Ennore oil spill or the Chennai oil spill
- Interactive map of 2017 Ennore oil spill or the Chennai oil spill
- Location: Ennore, Chennai
- Coordinates: 13.228166°N 80.363333°E
- Date: 28 January 2017

Cause
- Cause: Collision between the LPG tanker and oil tanker
- Casualties: None

Spill characteristics
- Shoreline impacted: Coromandel Coast

The 2017 Ennore oil spill occurred outside the Kamarajar Port in Ennore near Chennai in Tamil Nadu, India. The spill occurred on 28 January 2017 when an outbound empty tanker BW Maple collided with an inbound loaded oil tanker Dawn Kanchipuram at 04:00 local time.

== Location ==
The collision occurred two nautical miles off Kamarajar Port in Ennore, a natural harbour about 20 km north of Chennai on the Coromandel Coast. The Ennore Creek (swampy backwater traversing over 13 km between Pulicat Lake in the north and Kosasthalaiyar River in the south and emptying into the Bay of Bengal) separates the town of Ennore from the Government held public company Kamarajar Port.

== Timeline ==
The two ships collided at 4 am on 27 January 2017. In the morning, the Kamarajar port authority released a press statement that there is no damage to the environment and no casualty or injury to persons. It also indicated that both vessels are safely anchored and the extents of damage to the vessels are under assessment. By afternoon, oil spill sheen was visible with dead turtles being washed ashore and residents of nearby coastal areas reporting a strong smell of oil. The Indian Coast Guard confirmed they were assessing the situation and providing assistance required. The Coast Guard also said that the spill would be contained in less than 24 hours.

Investigation into the cause of the collision began on 29 January 2017. On 30 January 2017, the Kamarajar Port released a note claiming that there is no major damage to the environment or injury to persons and some sheens of oil traces were observed. It also stated that oil booms was deployed as a precautionary measure around the vessel Dawn Kanchipuram to contain seepage if any. The ship was subsequently brought into the port and berthed it after its cargo was discharged and vehicle inspections for damage assessment did not yield any evidence of an oil spill barring 'some sheens of oil traces', the press note said. The fishing community claimed that hundreds of fish had died and that they were unable to go for fishing because the spillage had come up to the shore.

== Containment and cleanup ==
On 31 January 2017, the district collector of Thiruvallur confirmed in a press meet that an oil spill took place after the incident on 28 January with Tamil Nadu Pollution Control Board and the Fisheries Department being deployed to look into the situation. Manual efforts to remove the oil spill were made by the Coast Guard, in addition to helicopter sorties to monitor the spread and assist in its removal. Three heavy buckets were used for removing the oil spill by Chennai Corporation. On 5 February, the then Chief Minister of Tamil Nadu O. Panneerselvam visited the site and declared that 90% of the clean up work was over with the remainder expected to be completed in a couple of days. He claimed tests had shown that the spill had not affected marine life, with fish safe for consumption, and also promised livelihood relief to the local fishing community. On 6 February, it was revealed that the viscous heavy oil being cleaned was heavy bunker fuel caused by a rupture in the fuel tanks of the oil tanker Dawn Kanchipuram and not from its cargo.

As on 7 February, the efforts to manage the oil spill had yielded approximately 160 metric tonnes of sludge, removed by over 5700 people.

In February 2017, the Indian Coast Guard said that approximately an area of 34,000 square metres (370,000 sq ft) was affected. He stated that 95 per cent of the spill was towards north of the Chennai Port with sludge accumulating over a length of 800 metres (2,600 ft) spread across 11 spots. He added that the shores of the city's Marina Beach suffered minimum impact and that the shoreline of the suburb Tiruvallur had oil accumulation over a 3 kilometres (1.9 mi) stretch. The volume of the spill was estimated at 9.9 million US gallons (37,000 m^{3}).

== Criticism ==
The Government of Tamil Nadu was criticized for its failures in crisis communication and contingency response.
