= Lower Mettur Hydroelectric Project =

- Location within Tamil Nadu
- Official name: Lower Mettur Hydroelectric Power Generation Project
- Coordinates: 11°44′50.3″N 77°47′18.8″E
- Purpose: Power
- Status: Operational
- Opening date: 1988
- Owner: Government of Tamil Nadu

Dam and spillways
- Type of dam: Barrage
- Impounds: Cauvery River

Power Station
- Commission date: 1988
- Turbines: 4 x 30 MW
- Installed capacity: 120 MW

Lower Mettur Hydroelectric Project is a hydropower generation project in the South Indian state of Tamil Nadu. It is a 120MW power generation project constructed across the Kaveri River. The project area is in the downstream of Mettur Dam, hence it derives the name. This project consists of four power plants which are located between Mettur in Salem district and Bhavani, Erode. This power generation project is owned by Government of Tamil Nadu and operated by Tamil Nadu Green Energy Corporation Limited.

== Power Plants ==
This project involves a series of power plants each with Barrage type Dam, constructed across the River Kaveri to divert the stream to where the power house is located. It consists of four Barrages each of which receives water current in a serial manner.

- Power Plant-I : Named as Chekkanur Barrage with Hydroelectric power generation capacity of 30MW. This Barrage has one powerhouse and two turbine units, each of 15MW production capacity.
- Power Plant-II : Named as Nerinjipettai Barrage with Hydroelectric power generation capacity of 30MW. This Barrage has one powerhouse on the western banks of the river and two turbines, each of 15MW Capacity.
- Power Plant-III : Named as Kuthiraikkalmedu Barrage with Hydroelectric power generation capacity of 30MW. This Barrage has one powerhouse on the western banks of the river and two turbines, each of 15MW Capacity.
- Power Plant-IV : Named as Urachikottai Barrage with Hydroelectric power generation capacity of 30MW. This Barrage has one powerhouse on the western banks of the river and two turbines, each of 15MW Capacity.
