= Uppur Thermal Power Project =

Uppur Superctical Thermal Power Project
- Uppur Supercritical Thermal Power Project
- Country: India
- Location: Ramanathapuram, Tamil Nadu
- Coordinates: 9°35′05.4″N 78°54′31.0″E
- Status: Under Construction
- Construction began: March 2016
- Construction cost: Rs 12,655 crores
- Operator: Tamil Nadu Power Generation Corporation Limited

Thermal power station
- Primary fuel: Coal

Power generation
- Nameplate capacity: 1,600 MW

Uppur Supercritical Thermal Power Project is located in Uppur and near Tiruvadanai, Ramanathapuram District in Tamil Nadu. The power plant is one of the coal based power plants of Tamil Nadu Power Generation Corporation Limited. This project is being constructed by BHEL, L&T and Reliance Infrastructure.

== Construction ==
RIL was awarded the engineering, procurement and construction contract in the BoP package and allied civil works, BHEL was awarded the boiler, turbine and generator contract and L&T was awarded the seawater intake and outfall system contract.

Materials for erection brought to the site and foundation process under progress. Foundation for two units of plant under Bharat Heavy Electricals Limited has already been completed. ESP 1 & ESP 2 foundation completed. The project is on hold at present.

== Installed Capacity ==
| Stage | Unit Number | Installed Capacity (MW) | Date of Commissioning | Status |
|---|---|---|---|---|
| Stage I | 2x800 MW | 1600 MW | 2021-22 | Under Constructions |
