= Tamil Nadu Power Generation Corporation Limited =

State-owned electric power generation company in India

- Type: State-owned enterprise
- Industry: Electric power generation
- Predecessor: Tamil Nadu Generation and Distribution Corporation
- Founded: 2024
- Headquarters: Chennai, Tamil Nadu, India
- Area served: Tamil Nadu
- Key people: Dr. J Radhakrishnan IAS Chairman; M Govinda Rao IAS MD
- Products: Electricity
- Services: Power generation
- Revenue: ▲₹17,292.57 crore (US$1.8 billion) (2024–25)
- Operating income: ▲₹4,367.33 crore (US$450 million) (2024–25)
- Net income: ▲₹−2,228.92 crore (US$−230 million) (2024–25)
- Total assets: ▲₹82,907.49 crore (US$8.6 billion) (2024–25)
- Total equity: ▲₹−40,719.30 crore (US$−4.2 billion) (2024–25)
- Parent: TNEB Limited
- Website: www.tnpgcl.org

Tamil Nadu Power Generation Corporation Limited (TNPGCL) is a state-owned electric power generation company headquartered in Chennai, Tamil Nadu, India. The corporation is responsible for operating thermal and gas-based power plants in the state and generating electricity for the Tamil Nadu power grid. It functions as a subsidiary of TNEB Limited and operates under the administrative control of the Government of Tamil Nadu.

The company was formed in 2024 following the restructuring of the Tamil Nadu Generation and Distribution Corporation (TANGEDCO), under which the power generation, power distribution and renewable energy operations were separated into independent companies.

== History ==
Electricity generation and distribution in Tamil Nadu were historically managed by the Tamil Nadu Electricity Board (TNEB). In 2010, the board was reorganised into a holding company called TNEB Limited, with separate subsidiaries for transmission and generation-distribution activities.

In 2024, the Government of Tamil Nadu further restructured TANGEDCO to improve operational efficiency and financial management. The restructuring created three new companies:

- Tamil Nadu Power Generation Corporation Limited (TNPGCL) – thermal and gas-based electricity generation
- Tamil Nadu Power Distribution Corporation Limited (TNPDCL) – electricity distribution
- Tamil Nadu Green Energy Corporation Limited (TNGECL) – renewable energy projects

Following this reorganisation, thermal power stations and gas turbine plants previously managed by TANGEDCO were transferred to TNPGCL.

== Operations ==
TNPGCL operates coal-based thermal power stations and gas turbine power plants across Tamil Nadu. These facilities form an important component of the state's electricity supply and help meet peak power demand.

== Installed capacity ==
Source	Installed capacity
Coal-based thermal power	~8,640 MW
Gas turbine power	~515 MW
Total installed capacity	~9,155 MW

== Operational power stations ==
Power station	Location	District	Fuel type	Units	Capacity (MW)	Commissioned	Ownership
North Chennai Thermal Power Station	Athipattu Pudunagar	Chennai	Coal	3 × 210 MW, 2 × 600 MW, 1 x 800 MW	2,630 MW	1995–2019	Tamil Nadu Power Generation Corporation Limited
Vallur Thermal Power Station	Vallur	Thiruvallur	Coal	3 × 500 MW	1,500 MW	2012–2015	Joint venture (NTPC-TNEB Energy Co. Ltd)
Mettur Thermal Power Station	Mettur	Salem	Coal	4 × 210 MW, 1 x 600 MW	1140 MW	1987–2012	Tamil Nadu Power Generation Corporation Limited
Tuticorin Thermal Power Station	Thoothukudi	Thoothukudi	Coal	5 × 210 MW	1,050 MW	1979–1993	Tamil Nadu Power Generation Corporation Limited
NTPL Thermal Power Station	Thoothukudi	Thoothukudi	Coal	2×500 MW	1,000 MW	2015	Joint venture (NLC Tamil Nadu Power Ltd)
Udangudi Super Critical Thermal Power Station	Udangudi	Thoothukudi	Coal	2×660 MW	1,320 MW	2026	Tamil Nadu Power Generation Corporation Limited
Basin Bridge Gas Turbine Power Station	Basin bridge	Chennai	Natural gas	4 × 30 MW	120 MW	1996	Tamil Nadu Power Generation Corporation Limited
Valuthur Gas Turbine Power Station	Valuthur	Ramanathapuram	Natural gas	Combined cycle	187 MW	2003	Tamil Nadu Power Generation Corporation Limited
Thirumakottai Gas Turbine Power Station	Thirumakkottai	Thiruvarur	Natural gas	Combined cycle	107.88 MW	2001	Tamil Nadu Power Generation Corporation Limited
Kuthalam Gas Turbine Power Station	Kuthalam	Mayiladuthurai	Natural gas	Combined cycle	101 MW	2003 - 2004	Tamil Nadu Power Generation Corporation Limited

== Power stations under construction ==
Power station	Location	District	Fuel type	Units	Capacity (MW)	Status
Ennore Thermal Power Station (Replacement Project)	Ennore	Chennai	Coal	1 × 660 MW	660	Under construction
Ennore SEZ Supercritical Thermal Power Project	Ennore	Chennai	Coal	2 × 660 MW	1,320	Under construction
Uppur Thermal Power Project	Uppur	Ramanathapuram	Coal	2 × 800 MW	1,600	Construction stalled

== Decommissioned power stations ==
Power station	Location	District	Fuel type	Units	Capacity (MW)	Year retired
Ennore Thermal Power Station (Old units)	Ennore	Chennai	Coal	2 × 60 MW, 3 x 110 MW	450 MW	2017

== See also ==
- Tamil Nadu Electricity Board
- Tamil Nadu Generation and Distribution Corporation
- Tamil Nadu Power Distribution Corporation Limited
- Tamil Nadu Green Energy Corporation Limited
- Energy in Tamil Nadu
