= Anuppampattu railway station =

Railway station in Tamil Nadu, India

Anuppampattu

General information
- Location: Anuppampattu, Chennai, Tamil Nadu, India
- Coordinates: 13.3043°N 80.2310°E
- System: Indian Railways and Chennai Suburban Railway station
- Owner: Ministry of Railways, Indian Railways
- Line: North line of Chennai Suburban Railway

Construction
- Structure type: Standard on-ground station
- Parking: Available

Other information
- Station code: APB
- Fare zone: Southern Railways

History
- Electrified: 13 April 1979
- Former names: South Indian Railway
Location
- Location within India Location within Tamil Nadu

Anuppampattu railway station is one of the railway stations of the Chennai Central–Gummidipoondi section of the Chennai Suburban Railway Network. It serves the neighbourhood of Anuppampattu, a suburb of Chennai, and is located 30 km north of Chennai Central railway station. It has an elevation of 12 m above sea level.

== History ==
The lines at the station were electrified on 13 April 1979, with the electrification of the Chennai Central–Gummidipoondi section.

== See also ==
- Chennai Suburban Railway
