= NTPL Thermal Power Station =

- Location of the NTPL Thermal Power Station
- Country: India
- Location: Harbour Estate, Thoothukudi, Tamil Nadu
- Coordinates: 8°45′32″N 78°10′54.8″E
- Status: Operational
- Commission date: Unit 1: March 2012; Unit 2: August 2012
- Owners: TNPGCL, NLC India Limited
- Operators: TNPGCL; NLC

Thermal power station
- Primary fuel: Coal

Power generation
- Units operational: 2 X 500 MW
- Nameplate capacity: 1000 MW

External links
- Website: www.ntplpower.com

NTPL Thermal Power Station is a 1000 MW (2×500 MW) coal-based thermal plant in the Tuticorin District of Tamil Nadu. The project is a joint venture of TNPGCL and NLC India Limited. The units were commissioned in March and April 2015, respectively.
