= North Chennai Thermal Power Station =

Thermal power station in India

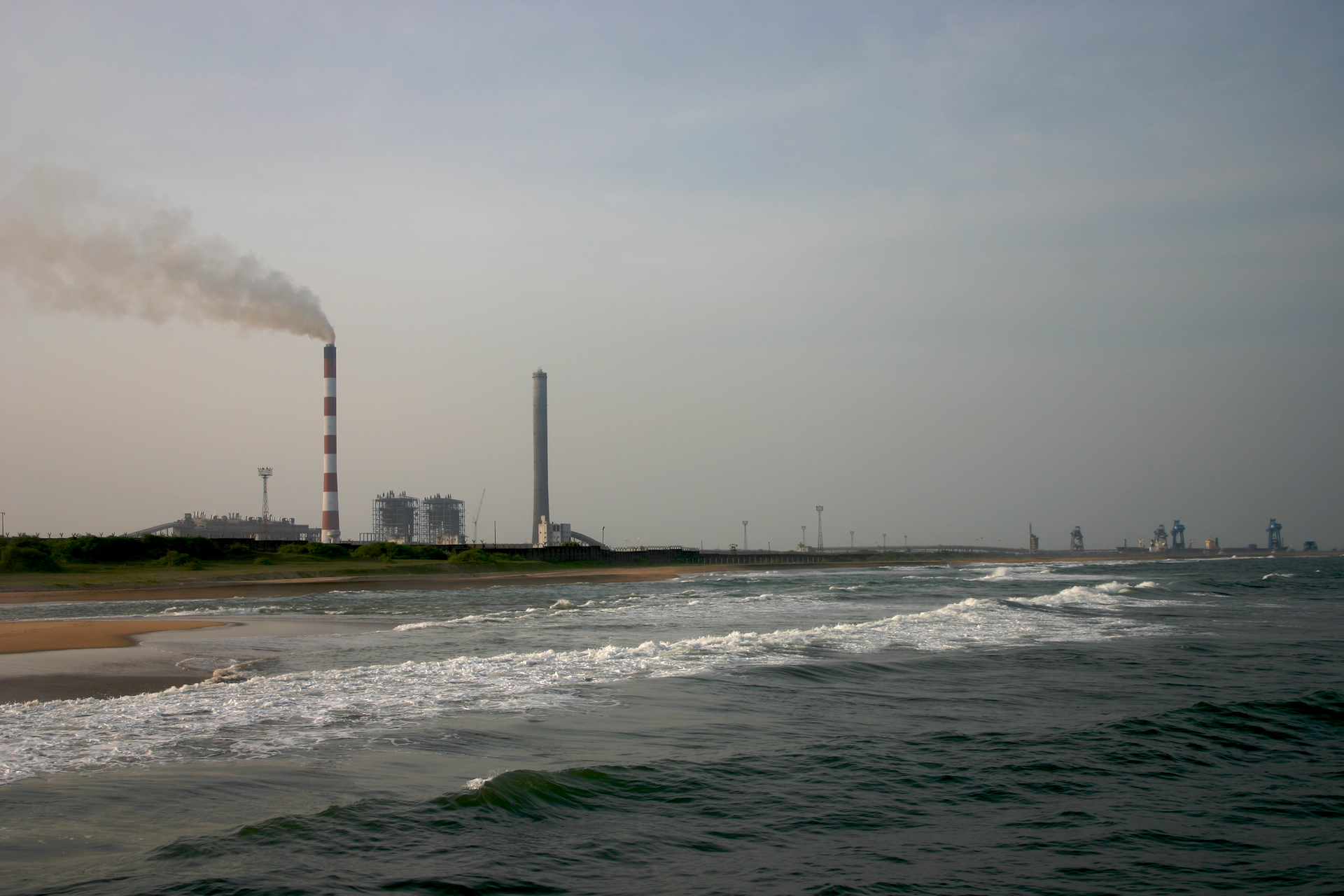
- North Chennai Thermal Power Station
- Location of the North Chennai Thermal Power Station
- Country: India
- Location: Athipattu Pudunagar, Chennai, Tamil Nadu
- Coordinates: 13°14′51″N 80°19′36″E
- Status: Operational
- Commission date: Unit 1: 25 October 1994; Unit 2: 27 March 1995; Unit 3: 24 February 1996; Unit 4: 3 March 2014; Unit 5: 8 May 2014; Unit 6: March 2024
- Operator: Tamil Nadu Power Generation Corporation Limited

Thermal power station
- Primary fuel: Bituminous coal

Power generation
- Units operational: 3 x 210 MW; 2 x 600 MW 1x800 MW
- Nameplate capacity: 2,630 MW

The North Chennai Thermal Power Station is a power station situated about 25 kilometres (16 mi) from Chennai city. It is one of the major power plants of Tamil Nadu and has a total installed capacity of 1,830 MW (2,450,000 hp).

== History ==
The North Chennai Thermal Power Station was commissioned in 1994 in the Thiruvallur district. It was built there due to its proximity to the Ennore Port, which also supplies Ennore Thermal Power Station. It has won various awards for productivity and reduction in auxiliary consumption. The coal necessary for the power station arrives from the Ennore Port. Recently a stator was brought to the station via the sea. In recent years, due to a shortage of coal in the state, coal has been imported to operate the power plant.

== Capacity ==
Stage	Unit Number	Installed Capacity (MW)	Date of Commissioning	Status
1st	1	210	1994 October	Running
1st	2	210	1995 March	Running
1st	3	210	1996 February	Running
2nd	4	600	2014 March	Running
2nd	5	600	2014 May	Running
3rd	6	800	2024 Mar	Running

== Pollution and threats ==
A 2014 study of coal plants in Southeast India documented extensive environmental impacts from the North Chennai Thermal Power Station, including dumping of large quantities of coal combustion waste into the Buckingham Canal and in nearby marshlands, leaking ash ponds, and discharge of hot water into Ennore Creek. The impacts have been especially felt by local fishing communities, which have protested the expansion of the plant. Additional impacts have been caused by dredging associated with Ennore Port, which supplies coal to the plant. Environmental activists are demanding that construction on the third phase of the North Chennai Thermal Power Station in Ennore be halted since there is a wide variety of wildlife within the area of the plant that is at risk from continued construction. It is planned for 2019–2020.

The North Chennai Thermal Power Station is polluting the area in Athipattu Pudunagar, Ennore and thus has taken away the livelihood of many residents. Air pollution is one part of it, as toxic gases get free when coal is burned and the dust of the coal that is stored around the plants accesses the lungs while breathing. Data of the Central Pollution Control Board proves that the air in Ennore is unhealthy to breathe. A huge threat to the environment in Athipattu Pudunagar and Ennore is the illegal dumping of fly ash by the Tamil Nadu Power Generation Corporation Limited, which is running the North Chennai Thermal Power Plant. Fly ash from the ash pond of the plant in leaking into the Ennore Creek. Ennore Creek plays a vital role in balancing the coastal ecosystem in the area. Fly ash is a by-product when coal gets burned and is toxic; it contains heavy metals such as arsenic, boron, cadmium, chromium, mercury and selenium. Heavy metals such as selenium bioaccumulate in fish and harm their ability to reproduce. This affects fish resources and in turn, livelihood of fishermen. In some areas the dumped ash has reduced the depth of the creek from 14 feet below sea level to 2 to 4 feet. This reduces the creek´s ability to carry water, which is crucial, especially in times of flooding and in some areas makes it nearly impossible for fishermen to use their boats on the water. In a recent order the southern bench of the National Green Tribunal forces TANGEDCO to remove the illegally dumped fly ash from the Ennore Creek. If TANGEDCO fails to do this within one week the two units from it will be shut down at the next hearing. Additionally, TANGEDCO has to repair leaking pipes and come up with a plan how to replace the old ones.

== See also ==
- List of power stations in India
