= Ennore =

Neighbourhood in Chennai district, Tamil Nadu, India

Ennore Kathivakkam
- Neighbourhood
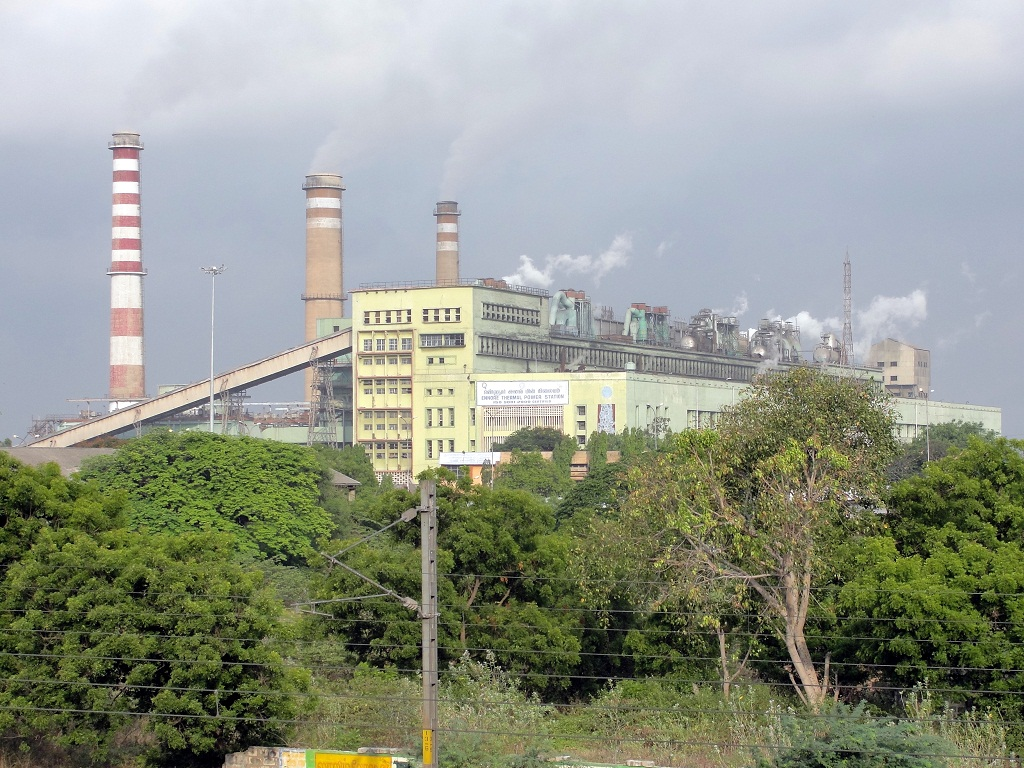

- Location in Chennai, India Ennore (Tamil Nadu) Ennore (India)
- Coordinates: 13.2175°N 80.32155°E
- Country: India
- State: Tamil Nadu
- District: Chennai & Tiruvallur districts
- Taluk: Tiruvottiyur & Ponneri taluks
- Local body: Ward 1 of Greater Chennai Corporation & Athipattu village panchayat
- Metro: Chennai
- Other neighbourhoods: Periya Kuppam, Kathivakkam

Government
  - Body: CMDA

Languages
  - Official: Tamil
- Time zone: UTC+5:30 (IST)
- PIN: 600057 & 600120
- Vehicle registration: TN-18
- Lok Sabha constituency: north Chennai
- Planning agency: CMDA

Ennore, also spelt Eṇṇūr, is a neighbourhood in Chennai, India. Ennore is situated on a peninsula and is bounded by the Korttalaiyar River, Ennore Creek and the Bay of Bengal. The creek separates south Ennore from the north Ennore which covers major portions of North Chennai Thermal Power Station and Ennore Port. The neighbourhood is served by Ennore railway station. Over the years Ennore has become the hub of a range of industrial projects, mainly thermal power stations, fertilizer factories, industrial ports and coal yards.

== History ==
The neighbourhood is part of the Avadi–Ambattur–Sembium–Tiruvottriyur–Ennore "auto belt" in the city's industrial north and west regions that developed when the automobile industry developed in Madras, in the early post-World War II years. Ennore was one of the "five 'new villages' " that were annexed with the then new British town of Madras in 1708.

== Administration ==
Administratively Ennore is divided into South and North regions. The mostly residential south region is governed by Greater Chennai Corporation as ward 1 in zone 1. The south region is a part of Kathivakkam revenue village in Tiruvottiyur taluk of Chennai district. The completely industrialized north region is governed by Athipattu village panchayat in Minjur revenue block. The north region is administered by Ennore revenue village in Athipattu Town Panchayat of Ponneri taluk of Tiruvallur district. The north region is completely occupied by North Chennai Thermal Power Station and Ennore Port.

== Ennore Creek ==
Ennore Creek is a backwater located in Tiruvallur district, Tamil Nadu. The Ennore Creek is bound on the north by the Pulicat Lake and to the south by the Manali marshlands. The Arani River enters the creek's northern edge below Lake Pulicat. To the south, Kosasthalaiyar River and the surplus course of the Puzhal Lake enter the creek. The estuary at Mugatwarakuppam drains all of these waters into the Bay of Bengal. Six revenue villages, namely Kathivakkam, Ennore, Puzhudhivakkam, Athipattu Pudunagar, Kattupalli and Kalanji are located around the Creek.

=== Environmental and economic significance ===
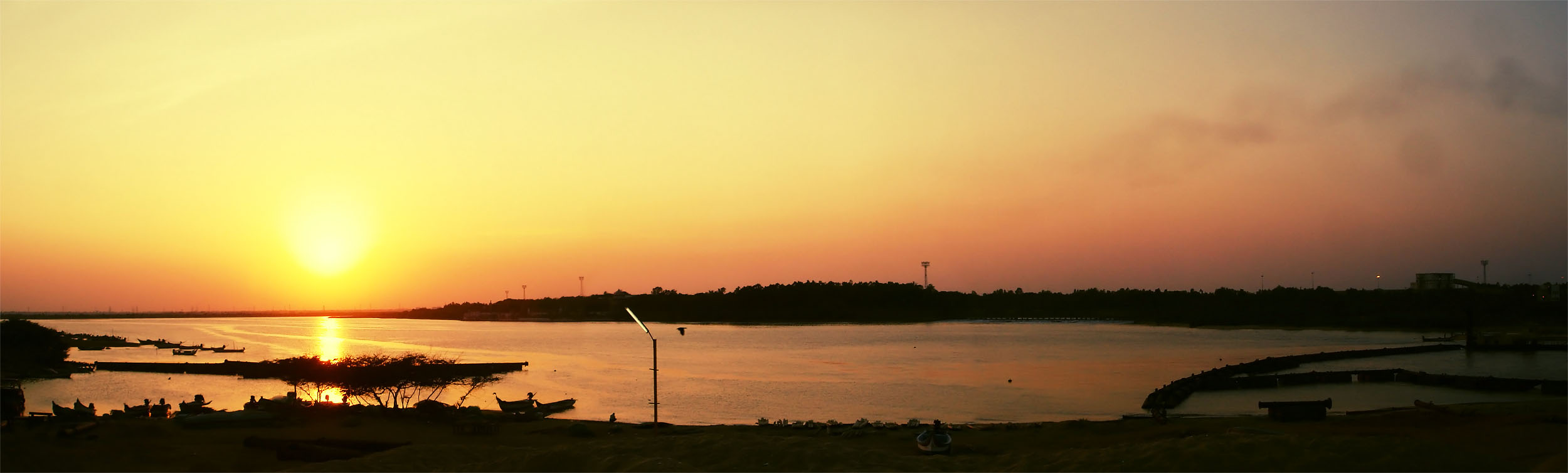
Sunset over the Ennore creek

Ennore Creek, along with the Buckingham Canal and the rest of the Pulicat water system has vast importance for the environment and for the local fisher folk. Ennore Creek nurtures a healthy aquatic ecosystem which was once famous for its rich biodiversity. This creek is part of a lagoon ecosystem that plays a vital role in balancing the coastal ecosystem in the area. The ecologically sensitive ecosystem was home to large swamps of mangroves that not only ensured a sustainable regeneration of fish resources, but also help mitigate flooding in times of strong rainfall, high tides and cyclones. Kuppam and Sivanpadaiveethi Kuppam rely wholly and perennially on the river and creek.

For decades, this creek sustained the livelihoods of the residents in the surrounding villages and has been demarcated as CRZ I (ecologically sensitive area in the coastal zone management plan by the Tamil Nadu State Coastal Zone Management Authority). Undertaking any reclamation, bunding, construction or altering the natural courses of such water bodies is illegal under the CRZ Notification 2011, Water (Prevention and Control of Pollution) Act 1974 and the Environment Protection Act, 1986.

== Threats and issues ==
Despite being protected under such regulations, the unplanned industrial development of this area over the last few decades have had devastating effects on the whole ecosystem, resulting in loss of ecology and livelihoods of the fishing communities. The creek is encroached by industries in several locations, which led to a reduction of the water covered area. Already 1090 acres of the total 8000 acres of the Creek are encroached. Of the area that is still water covered the depth of the water is reduced by fly ash from the North Chennai Thermal Power Station. In some areas the ash has reduced the depth of the creek from 14 feet below sea level to 2 to 4 feet. This reduces the creek's ability to carry water, which is crucial, especially in times of flooding.

=== Flooding ===
In December 2015, areas like Kuruvimedu, Athipattu, Athipattu Pudunagar, Ernavur, Manali New Town etc. were badly affected by floodwaters that did not recede as expected. The drastic reduction in the wetland area, and the depth of what remained has reduced the Creek's ability to evacuate floodwaters from Kosasthalaiyar, Puzhal surplus, Buckingham Canal and the Araniyar.

=== Storm surges ===
In December 2016, Cyclone Vardah made landfall in Pulicat, in the Ennore region. The resultant storm surge of more than 1 metre above the astronomic tide had reportedly inundated low-lying areas in the region. Normally, the Creek is the first shock absorber to deter the storm surge. But with its water carrying capacity vastly reduced, the Creek's ability to absorb storm shocks has also declined. As the encroachment continues, storm surges will send seawater deep into the hinterland through the rivers, streams and channels and inundate areas that have never before experienced flooding due to tidal surges.

=== Salinity intrusion ===
The AK-basin, or the area between Araniyar and Kosasthalaiyar, has an important place in Chennai's water security map. The groundwater rich basin has six well-fields – Minjur, Panjeti, Thamaraipakkam, Poondi, Kannagiper and Floodplains—that yields up to 100 mld water for Chennai during stressed times. The AK-basin is also witnessing aggressive salinity intrusion due to a number of factors. To combat it, the state has invested money and fresh water in constructing injection wells and tidal regulators. The Creek maintains a salinity gradient, and prevents seawater from entering too deep into the hinterland through the rivers, streams and channels. However, as the waterspread and Creek depth decline, tidal influence will begin to be felt further inland.

The Ennore Creek's western edges – which are the areas that have been and are currently being encroached – are salt marshes and abandoned salt pans. Both are wetlands as defined under the National Wetland Rules, and have been demarcated as such by the Government of Tamil Nadu under the Rules. By storing rainwater or lower salinity water, especially in the weeks and months after monsoons, the Ennore Creek's western edges already help offer some defence against salinity intrusion. Currently the salt pans and salt marshes are being converted to industrial establishments by altering the contours.

=== Economically impact on the residents ===
The fishing villages located in and around Ennore have for many years depended on the Creek as a source of livelihood and sustenance. Owing to the excessive industrial takeover in the region for many years now the number of fish in the creek declined significantly due to the leakage of toxic waste water from factories and the dumping of toxic fly ash. A study by the Aquaculture Foundation of India and three institutions including Anna University, found high concentrations of heavy metals in the water and marine organisms in and around Ennore creek due to pollution from industries and domestic sources. This study found high levels of heavy metals such as mercury, cadmium and chromium. Species such as flathead grey mullet, a widely eaten fish had levels that hovered close to dangerous limits. Over the years, several commercially valuable fish – including tiger prawn, mud crab, striped crab, sand whiting, silver biddy, cat fish, mackerel, grey eel catfish, croaker and white prawn – have disappeared from the creek. In some areas the depth of the river has become so low, that is it impossible for a small fishing boat to move on it. Fishermen have lost their primary source of income and their lives been reduced to poverty.

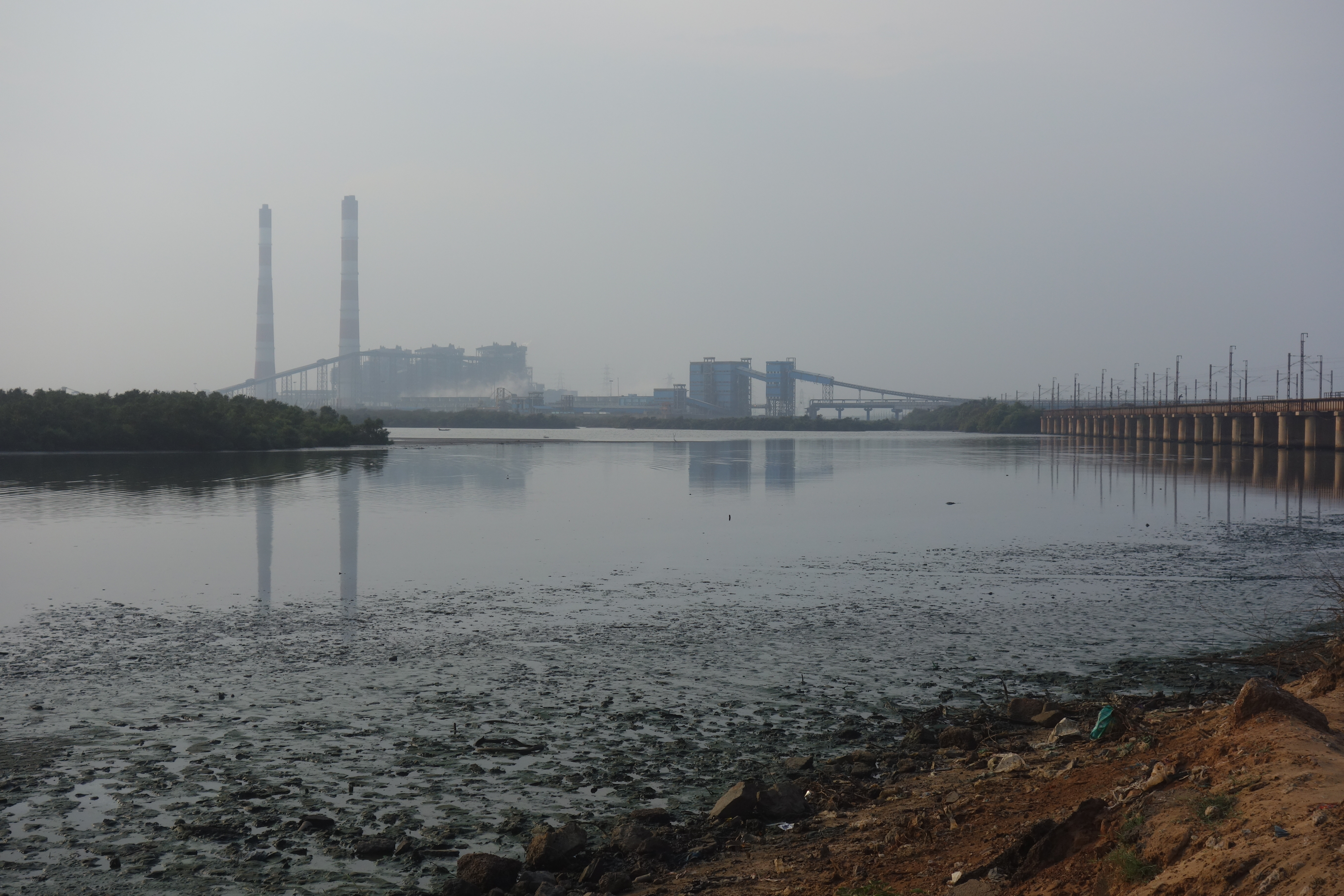
Due to siltation the creek has become very shallow, which makes fishing more difficult.

=== Air pollution and health problems of residents ===
Many of the industries in Ennore pollute the air, especially the Thermal Power Plants. Data from the Central Pollution Control Board and from independent bodies show that the air quality is clearly worse than the limits and can only be prescribed as "unhealthy" or "very unhealthy". For PM 2.5 (Particulate Matter or dust less than 2.5 micrometers in size) the air pollution is up to 3.7 times higher than standards prescribed by the Ministry of Environment, Forests and Climate Change (MoEFCC). Data from the CPCB for the region shows that from 01.06.2017 to 22.06.2017 the level of PM 2.5 was 88 μg/m^{3}, which is clearly higher than the prescribed standard (60 μg/m^{3}). PM 2.5 can lead to asthma, lung cancer and even heart attacks. Many residents in Ennore suffer from health problems. Old residents tell that those problems were absent decades ago and started with the industrialisation of the area. Public health specialists confirm that air pollution in Ennore can affect the health of the residents negatively.

== Industries and developmental projects ==
Over the years Ennore has become the hub of a range of industrial projects, mainly thermal power stations, fertilizer factories, industrial ports and coal yards. Many of them let their untreated wastewater flow into the Ennore Creek; others amount to the air pollution in Ennore. The Ennore Creek is surrounded by multiple industrial projects namely-

- North
1. North Chennai Thermal Power Station (NCTPS) 3×210 MW; 2x 600 MW
2. Kamaraj Port Limited (KPL; formerly known as Ennore Port)
3. L&T Ship Building Yard
- West
1. Chettinad International Coal Terminal
2. NTECL's Vallur Thermal Power Station 3×500 MW
3. HPCL – Hindustan Petroleum Corporation Limited
- South
1. Ennore Thermal Power Plant (Oldest operational power plant in the region) 2 x 60 MW; 3 x 110 MW
2. Coromandel Fertilizer
3. Kothari Fertilizer
4. Ashok Leyland
5. Hinduja Foundries
6. EID Parry
- Within a 5 km radius:
1. Manali Industrial Area
2. Madras Fertilizers Limited
- New proposals for thermal power projects in the region include:
1. 800 MW NCTPS Stage III, on the green belt of the current NCTPS, Ennore
2. 1600 MW Ennore SEZ, on the ash pond of NCTPS
3. 1200 MW North Chennai Power Company, at Katupalli
4. 1030 MW Chennai Power Generation Ltd, Katupalli and Kalanji village

== Oil spill ==
The 2017 Ennore oil spill was an oil spill that occurred outside the Kamarajar Port in Ernavoor, Tamil Nadu, India, on 28 January 2017. The spill occurred when the outbound empty LPG tanker M. T. BW Maple collided with the inbound fully loaded oil tanker M.T. Dawn Kanchipuram around 04:00 local time. In total around 196 tonnes of bunker fuel oil spilled into the sea. The coastline from Ennore southwards until Pondicherry (a stretch of 180 km) was in different severity affected by the spill, with the shore of Ennore most severely hit. There were reports of dead fish and dead olive ridley turtle along the coast on different beaches in Chennai and around. The impact of the spill has directly affected the local fishing community as there was a sharp fall in fish sale due to the existing notion amongst public that fishes are contaminated with oil and not fit to consume. Workers had to clean the oil on the shore without adequate protection which lead to skin irritation, throat irritation and breathing problems.

== Schools ==
Ennore has got good number of Government schools. Government High School, Kathivakkam Elementary School. The Leading Private schools are Sri SSM Group of Schools, Parthasarathy Matriculation School, St. Joseph Matriculation School, V.O.C. Matriculation School, Child park school and Annamalai Matriculation Schools.

== Transportation ==
Metropolitan Transport Corporation runs passenger buses to Ennore from other major parts of Chennai city.

Route number 4, 4M (Minjur-Ennore- Broadway),56F is available frequently from Broadway Bus Terminus (Parrys), 56, 56A from Vallalar Nagar (Mint), 159E, 121C from CMBT, 1C, 1D from Thiruvanmiyur, 28B from Egmore Railway Station. 4C from Chennai central, 157E from redhills.

== Films and music ==
Ennore has been featured in many of the Tamil and other language movies. The climax fight in the popular Tamil movie "Kaaka Kaaka" was filmed in a place called Sandbar in Ennore. Some scenes from the 2023 film Maaveeran were also canned here. Environmental activist Nityanand Jayaraman produced the ‘Chennai Poromboke Paadal’, featuring T.M. Krishna, as part of a campaign to raise awareness about the encroachment on Chennai's Ennore Creek.
