= Ennore Thermal Power Station =

Building in India

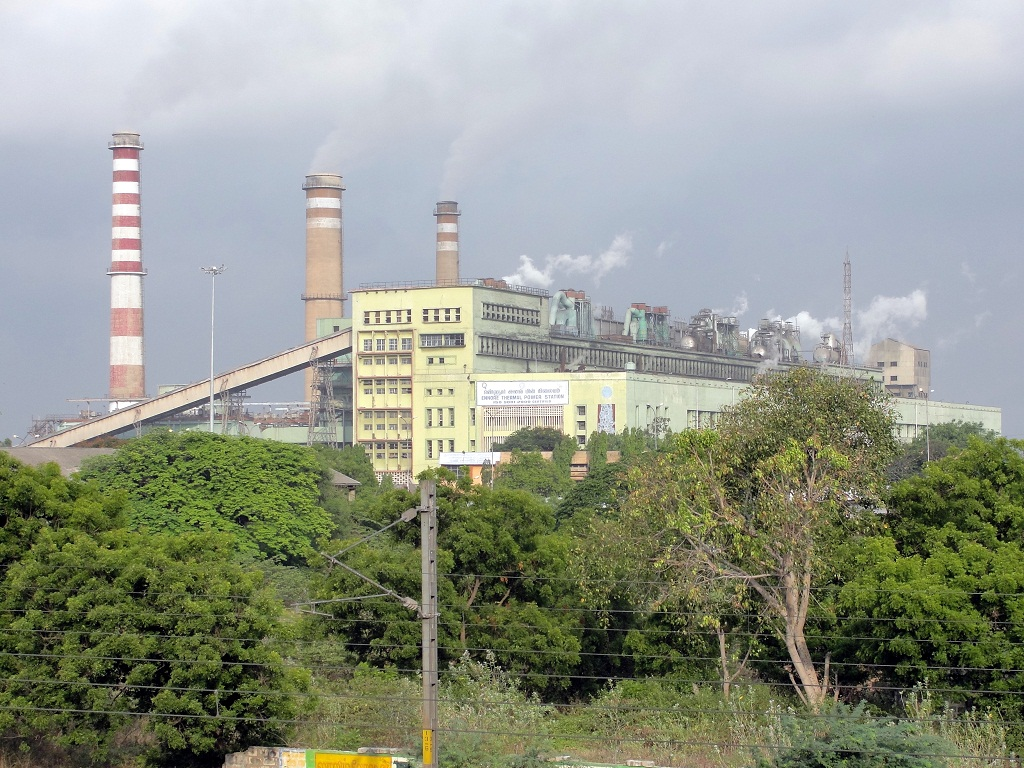
- The Ennore Thermal Power Station in Tamil Nadu
- Country: India
- Location: Ennore, Chennai, Tamil Nadu
- Coordinates: 13°12′5″N 80°18′42″E
- Status: Decommissioned, new unit under construction
- Commission date: Unit 1: 31 March 1970; Unit 2: 14 February 1971; Unit 3: 17 May 1972; Unit 4: 26 May 1973; Unit 5: 2 December 1975; New Unit: 2022-23
- Decommission date: All old Units March 31, 2017
- Operator: Tamil Nadu Power Generation Corporation Limited

Thermal power station
- Primary fuel: Bituminous coal

Power generation
- Units operational: 2 x 60 MW; 3 x 110 MW
- Nameplate capacity: 450 MW

The Ennore Thermal Power Station is a coal based power plant located in Chennai Ennore, Tamil Nadu.

== History ==
Ennore Thermal Power Station was constructed to serve the purpose of energy generation in the year 1970. It is one of the four major thermal power plants of Tamil Nadu established by the Tamil Nadu Power Generation Corporation Limited. Presently it has an installed capacity of 450 MW (600,000 hp). The necessary coal arrives through ship to the Ennore Port. However, the construction of the 1,000 MW plants (1,300,000 hp) in the premise began in the year 2007. The Station presently consists of two 60-MW and three 110-MW units. A 500-MW coal-based unit was proposed, and its development started in the month of November 2007. The total cost of the venture was 270 crores. The plant was shut down on 31.03.2017 and will be replaced.

== Features ==
The Power Station has been a major provider of electricity in the state and its production capacity has been improved over the years. The Ennore Power Station has also garnered various awards from the Tamil Nadu Power Generation Corporation Limited. However power deficit seems to be playing an important role for the recent decision. It also has a special treatment plant to dispose the ash slurry in a proper way.

Coal for ETPS is received from MCL (Talchar and Ib Valley), Orissa and ECL, Raniganj, West Bengal. The plant load factor (PLF) for the year 2008–2009 was 49.17 percent.

=== Capacity ===
Unit Number	Installed Capacity (MW)	Date of Commissioning	Date of Decommissioning	Status
1	60	31 March 1970	March 31, 2017	Decommissioned
2	60	14 February 1971	March 31, 2017	Decommissioned
3	110	17 May 1972	March 31, 2017	Decommissioned
4	110	26 May 1973	March 31, 2017	Decommissioned
5	110	2 December 1975	March 31, 2017	Decommissioned
6	660	2022-23	N/A	Under Construction

== Shut down and Proposed Replacement ==
After more than forty years the Power Plant was shut down permanently on March 31, 2017. It will be replaced with a single Supercritical unit of 660 MW, also run by the Tamil Nadu Power Generation Corporation Limited. The replacement does not have clearance yet. The plant is opposed by the residents who fear that the new plant will degrade the air quality and lead to a loss of fishing livelihoods.

== See also ==
- List of power stations in India
