= Tamil Nadu Generation and Distribution Corporation =

Public sector undertaking of Tamil Nadu, India

Tamil Nadu Generation and Distribution Corporation Limited
- Company type: Public Sector Undertaking
- Industry: Electric utility
- Predecessor: Tamil Nadu Electricity Board
- Founded: 1 November 2010 (15 years ago)
- Defunct: 2024
- Fate: Fate: Split into TNPGCL (fossil fuel generation), TNPDCL (distribution) and TNGECL (renewable energy).
- Successors: Tamil Nadu Power Generation Corporation Limited; Tamil Nadu Power Distribution Corporation Limited; Tamil Nadu Green Energy Corporation Limited
- Headquarters: Chennai, Tamil Nadu, India
- Area served: Tamil Nadu
- Key people: Rajesh Lakhoni, IAS (Chairman & MD)
- Products: Electric power
- Services: Electricity generation Electricity distribution
- Revenue: ▲₹65,177.10 crore (equivalent to ₹770 billion or US$8.0 billion in 2023) (2019–20)
- Operating income: ▲₹56,295.39 crore (equivalent to ₹660 billion or US$6.9 billion in 2023) (2019–20)
- Net income: ▲₹−11,964.93 crore (equivalent to ₹−140 billion or US$−1.5 billion in 2023) (2019–20)
- Total assets: ▲₹146,429.12 crore (equivalent to ₹1.7 trillion or US$18 billion in 2023) (2019–20)
- Owner: Government of Tamil Nadu
- Parent: TNEB Limited
- Divisions: Electricity Generation Wing; Electricity Distribution Wing
- Website: www.tangedco.gov.in

The Tamil Nadu Generation and Distribution Corporation Limited (TANGEDCO) is an electrical power generation and distribution public sector undertaking owned by the Government of Tamil Nadu. It was formed on 1 November 2010 under section 131 of the Electricity Act of 2003, and is the successor to the erstwhile Tamil Nadu Electricity Board. The electricity board's generation and distribution wings are its nucleus. TANGEDCO is a subsidiary of TNEB Limited. From July 13 2024, TANGEDCO has been trifurcated into 3 organizations namely Tamil Nadu Power Generation Corporation Limited (TNPGCL), Tamil Nadu Power Distribution Corporation Limited (TNPDCL), Tamil Nadu Green Energy Corporation Limited (TNGECL).

== History ==
Tamil Nadu Generation and Distribution Corporation Limited (TANGEDCO) was incorporated on 1 November 2010 as part of the restructuring of the Tamil Nadu Electricity Board (TNEB) under the Electricity Act, 2003. Under this restructuring, TNEB was converted into a holding company (TNEB Limited) with Tamil Nadu Transmission Corporation Limited (TANTRANSCO) and TANGEDCO as subsidiary companies.

TANGEDCO was entrusted with the responsibility of electricity generation and distribution in Tamil Nadu and operated thermal, hydroelectric, gas turbine and renewable energy power stations across the state.

== Restructuring ==
In 2024, the Government of Tamil Nadu approved the further restructuring of TANGEDCO under the THE TAMIL NADU ELECTRICITY RESTRUCTURING AND TRANSFER SCHEME, 2024 to improve efficiency and financial sustainability of the state power sector.

As part of the restructuring, the generation activities were transferred to Tamil Nadu Power Generation Corporation Limited (TNPGCL), distribution operations to Tamil Nadu Power Distribution Corporation Limited (TNPDCL), and renewable energy assets to Tamil Nadu Green Energy Corporation Limited (TNGECL).

Following the reorganisation, TANGEDCO ceased to operate as an integrated generation and distribution utility, with its functions assumed by the successor entities.
