= Anuppampattu =

Village in Tamil Nadu, India

- Village
- Interactive map of Anuppampattu
- Coordinates: 13.3043°N 80.2310°E
- Country: India
- State: Tamil Nadu
- District: Tiruvallur district
- Taluk: Ponneri taluk

Area
  - Total: 961.57 ha (2,376.1 acres)

Population
  - Total: 8,719

Anuppampattu is a village situated in the Ponneri Taluk of the Tiruvallur district in the Indian state of Tamil Nadu. The village falls under the administrative jurisdiction of Siruvakkam gram panchayat. Thiruvallur and Ponneri serve as the district and sub-district headquarters for Anuppampattu, respectively.

== Geography ==
Anuppampattu spans a total geographical area of 961.57 hectares.

== Demographics ==
According to the 2011 Census of India, Anuppampattu has a total population of 8,719 individuals. The population is almost evenly split between men and women, with 4,370 men and 4,349 women. The village has a literacy rate of 77.69%, with male literacy at 85.44% and female literacy at 70.00%. There are around 2,350 houses in Anuppampattu.

== Economy ==
Ponneri, being the nearest town to Anuppampattu (about 4km away), serves as the hub for major economic activities for the residents of the village. Its proximity to Ponneri facilitates easy access to markets, healthcare, and other essential services.

As of 2011, out of the 4119 people working more than six months of the year, 1384 (37%) were either farm owners, co-owners, or agricultural laborers.
