= Sterlite Energy =

Indian energy company

Sterlite Energy Limited
- Company type: Public
- Industry: Energy
- Founded: 2006; 20 years ago, in New Delhi, India
- Headquarters: New Delhi, India
- Area served: India
- Parent: Vedanta Limited
- Website: www.sterliteenergy.co.in

Sterlite Energy Limited (SEL) is an energy company focused on development and operation of power plants in India. SEL is a subsidiary of Vedanta Resources PLC.

== Projects ==
=== Jharsuguda, Odisha ===
Sterlite Energy Limited is developing Sterlite Jharsuguda Power Station 2400 MW coal-fired thermal power project in Jharsuguda, Odisha. The project will develop 4 units of 600MW each.

=== Talwandi Sabo Power Project ===
SEL is developing the 1980 MW Talwandi Sabo Power Project at village Banawala, Mansa-Talwandi Sabo in District Mansa. Punjab. This is also a coal-fired thermal power production project with 3 units of 660 MW each. Now as per the new agreement between Punjab State Electricity Board (PSEB) and Sterlite Energy Limited (SEL), SEL is to add one more unit of 660 MW to the upcoming thermal project of 1980 (3x660) MW at Talwandi Sabo in Mansa district. Talwandi Sabo Power Ltd (TSPL) will make the first unit of 660 MW to be operational by the end of 2012 and other two units 2x660 by the end of 2013. Sterlite Energy Ltd (SEL) was selected as the developer of the project based on the Tariff Based International Competitive Bidding Process (Case-2) on BOO basis for supply of 100 per cent power to Punjab State Electricity Board (PSEB) for 25 years as per the guidelines of Government of India. Power Purchase Agreement and other related agreements were signed between TSPL and PSEB on 1 September 2008 and the ownership of Talwandi Sabo Power Limited was transferred to Sterlite Energy Limited (SEL) on that date.
