= Tamil Nadu Power Distribution Corporation Limited =

Electricity company in Tamil Nadu, India

- Company type: State-owned enterprise
- Industry: Electric power distribution
- Predecessor: Tamil Nadu Generation and Distribution Corporation
- Founded: 2024
- Headquarters: Chennai, Tamil Nadu, India
- Area served: Tamil Nadu
- Key people: Dr. J Radhakrishnan IAS (Chairman &MD)
- Products: Electricity
- Services: Power distribution
- Revenue: ▲₹100,417 crore (US$10 billion) (2024–25)
- Operating income: ▲₹2,073 crore (US$220 million) (2024–25)
- Net income: ▲₹2,073 crore (US$220 million) (2024–25)
- Total assets: ₹90,658 crore (US$9.5 billion) (2024–25)
- Total equity: ₹−107,957 crore (US$−11 billion) (2024–25)
- Parent: TNEB Limited
- Website: www.tnpdcl.org

The Tamil Nadu Power Distribution Corporation Limited (TNPDCL) is a state-owned electric power distribution company responsible for distribution and retail supply of electricity in the Indian state of Tamil Nadu. The company was formed in 2024 following the restructuring of the Tamil Nadu Generation and Distribution Corporation (TANGEDCO) into separate generation, distribution and renewable energy companies.

== History ==
TNPDCL was created under the Tamil Nadu Electricity Restructuring and Transfer Scheme, 2024, which reorganized TANGEDCO into three separate companies:

- Tamil Nadu Power Generation Corporation Limited (TNPGCL)
- Tamil Nadu Power Distribution Corporation Limited (TNPDCL)
- Tamil Nadu Green Energy Corporation Limited (TNGECL)

As part of the restructuring, TNPDCL took over the electricity distribution operations of TANGEDCO, while TNPGCL assumed responsibility for thermal generation assets.

== Operations ==
TNPDCL is responsible for electricity distribution to domestic, commercial, industrial and agricultural consumers across Tamil Nadu through a network of substations, feeders and distribution transformers.

The corporation also undertakes power procurement through long-term and medium-term power purchase agreements to meet electricity demand.

TNPDCL also manages consumer services including billing, new service connections and grievance redressal mechanisms.

== Financials ==
Following restructuring, TNPDCL inherited a significant portion of the liabilities of the former TANGEDCO. Financial restructuring measures and state government support have been implemented to improve its financial sustainability.

The company's financial profile has also been evaluated by credit rating agencies in connection with borrowing programmes.

== Organisation ==
TNPDCL operates under Tamil Nadu Electricity Board Limited, which acts as the holding company for the restructured electricity utilities of Tamil Nadu. Electricity transmission is handled by Tamil Nadu Transmission Corporation Limited (TANTRANSCO), while electricity generation is handled by Tamil Nadu Power Generation Corporation Limited (TNPGCL).Tamil Nadu Green Energy Corporation Limited (TNGECL) is responsible for managing the existing hydroelectric power stations, pumped storage hydroelectric stations, and renewable energy projects in Tamil Nadu.

== See also ==
- Tamil Nadu Electricity Board
- Energy in Tamil Nadu
- Electric power distribution
- Electricity sector in India
- State-owned enterprise
