= Tuticorin Thermal Power Station =

Power station in Tamil Nadu, India

Thoothukudi Thermal Power Station
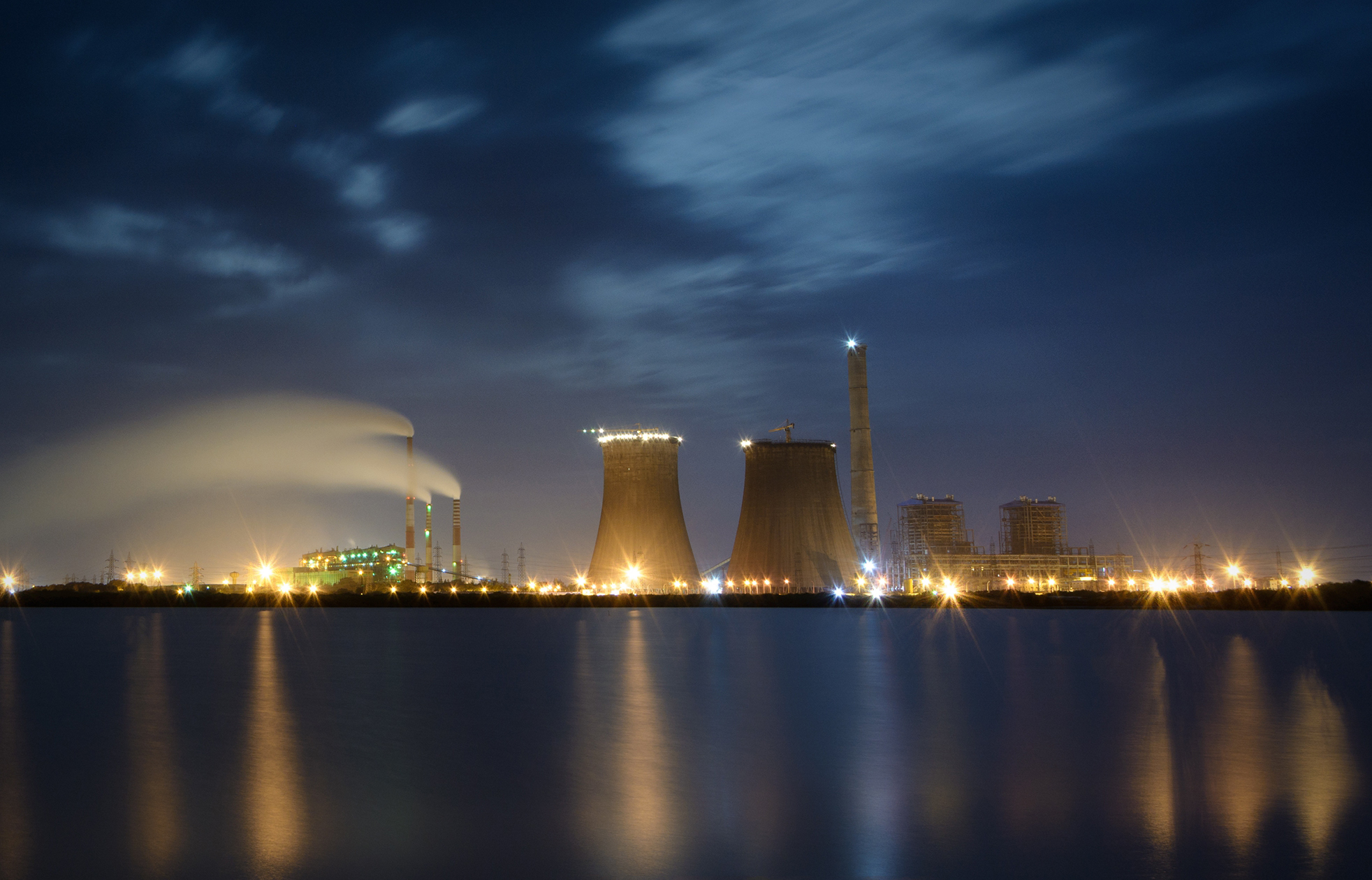
- Thoothukudi Thermal Power Station
- Location of the Thoothukudi Thermal Power Station
- Country: India
- Location: Thoothukudi, Tamil Nadu
- Coordinates: 8°45′51″N 78°10′36″E
- Status: Operational
- Commission date: Unit 1: 9 July 1979; Unit 2: 17 December 1980; Unit 3: 16 April 1982; Unit 4: 11 February 1992; Unit 5: 31 March 1991
- Owner: Tamil Nadu Power Generation Corporation Limited
- Operator: Tamil Nadu Power Generation Corporation Limited

Thermal power station
- Primary fuel: Bituminous coal

Power generation
- Units operational: 5 × 210 MW
- Nameplate capacity: 1,050 MW

External links
- Commons: Related media on Commons

Thoothukudi Thermal Power Station (Tamil: தூத்துக்குடி அனல் மின் நிலையம்) is a power plant situated near newport of Thoothukudi in Tamil Nadu, India, on the sea shore of Bay of Bengal.

It has 5 units with a total installed capacity of 1,050 MW and spread over 160 hectares (400 acres). All the unit are coal based. Coal is transported by sea through ship from Haldia, Paradeep, Vizag Port to TTPS. Coal transported by ship is given to crushers which crush the coal particles to 10-20mm in diameter. The crushed coal is fed to coal grinding mills with bowl roller via coal bunkers. The powdered coal is given to pulverisers and to furnace through forced draft fans. There are four mills around the furnace as well as oil injecting nozzles from oil storage for tangential firing.

Smoke from the Tuticorin Thermal Power Station, India, as seen from an aircraft.

== See also ==
- Energy in India
