= Sterlite Jharsuguda Power Station =

Coal power plant in Odisha, India

Coordinates: 21.788396°N 84.055109°E

Jharsuguda Power Station is a coal-based thermal power plant located at Burkhamunda near Jharsuguda town in Jharsuguda district in the Indian state of Odisha. The power plant is operated by the Sterlite Energy.

The coal for the plant is sourced from Ib Valley Coalfield. Water is sourced from the reservoir of Hirakud Dam. The Engineering, procurement and construction contract is given to SEPCO3 of People's Republic of China.

== Capacity ==
It is a 2400 MW (4×600 MW) project.

Unit No.	Capacity (MW)	Commissioned on	Status
1	600	2010 August	Running
2	600	2011 January	Running
3	600	2011	Running
4	600	2012	Running
