= Tamil Nadu Energy Development Agency =

State agency in India

- Type: Government of Tamil Nadu's Nodal Agencies
- Industry: Energy Development
- Founded: 29 November 1984; 41 years ago
- Defunct: 2024
- Fate: Merged With Tamil Nadu Green Energy Corporation Limited (TNGECL)
- Headquarters: Chennai, Tamil Nadu, India
- Website: www.teda.in

Tamil Nadu Energy Development Agency (TEDA) (Tamil: தமிழ்நாடு எரிசக்தி வளர்ச்சி முகமை) is a state government owned agency in the Indian state of Tamil Nadu. Established in 1984, the agency's task is promoting and increasing the New and Renewable energy sources in this state. This government undertaking is also the Nodal agency for Renewable energy related interests in this state. From July 2024, TEDA is merged with Tamilnadu Green Energy Corporation Limited (abbreviated as TNGECL) along with the Renewable Energy wing of TANGEDCO.

== Overview ==
TEDA was established as a society under the Societies Registration Act in 1984 with the objective of promoting renewable energy in all its aspects like Identification, Trapping, Research and Development and conservation. The Government of Tamil Nadu is giving emphasis on the development of renewable energy through this agency by implementation of various schemes like providing technical expertise, financial assistance to individuals, non-profit organisations etc. who wish to participate in this greener initiative. It is very necessary to get registered in order to be a system integrator in Tamil Nadu.
