= Athipattu Pudhunagar railway station =

Railway station in Chennai, India

Athipattu Pudhunagar
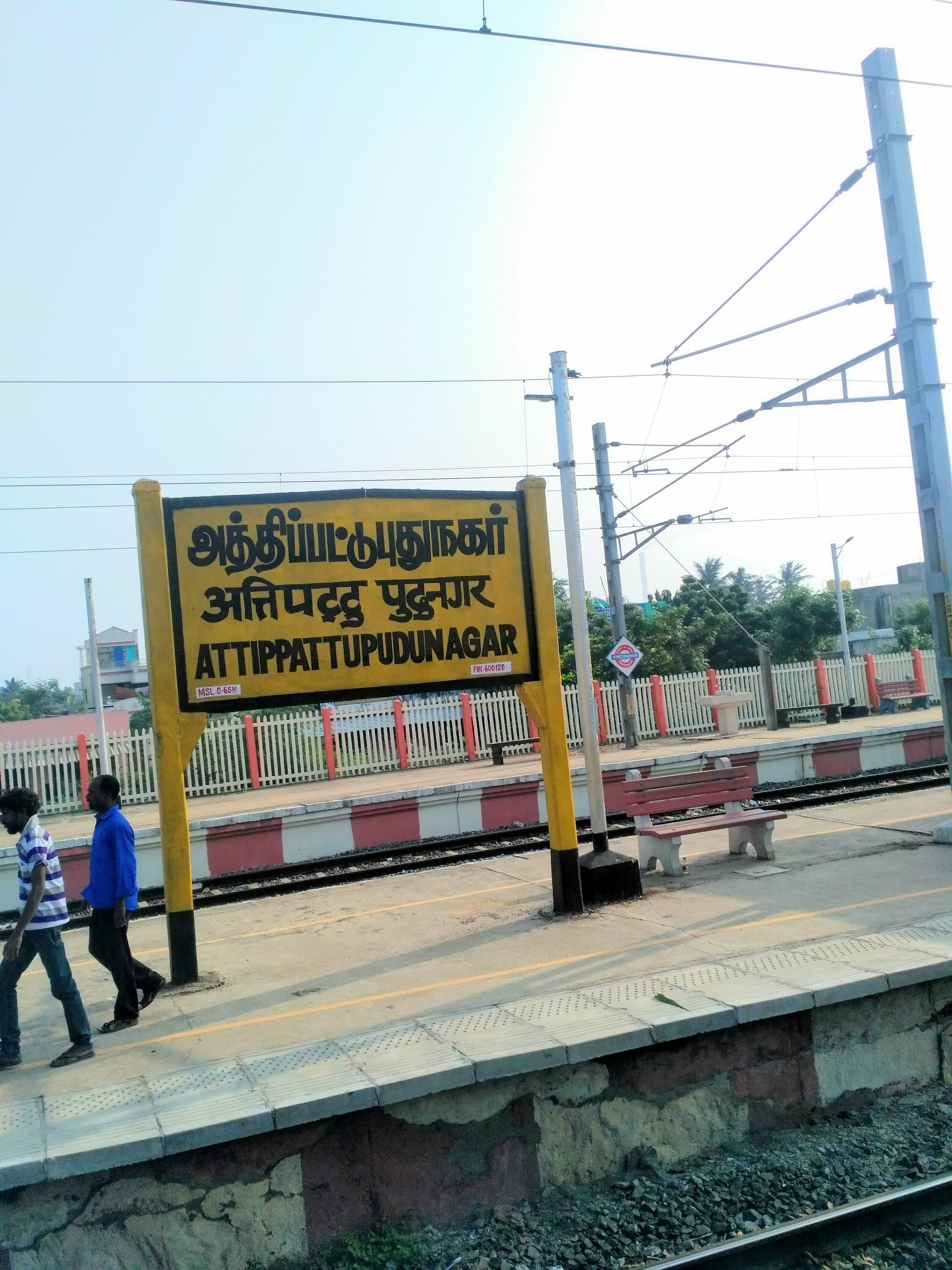

General information
- Location: Athipattu Pudhunagar, Chennai, Tamil Nadu, India
- Coordinates: 13°15′0″N 80°17′56″E
- System: Indian Railways and Chennai Suburban Railway station
- Owner: Ministry of Railways, Indian Railways
- Line: North line of Chennai Suburban Railway

Construction
- Structure type: Standard on-ground station
- Parking: Available

Other information
- Status: Active
- Station code: AIPP
- Fare zone: Southern Railways

History
- Electrified: 13 April 1979
- Former names: South Indian Railway
Location
- Location within India Location within Tamil Nadu

Athipattu Pudhunagar railway station is one of the railway station of the Chennai Central–Gummidipoondi section of the Chennai Suburban Railway Network. It serves the neighbourhood of Athipattu Pudhunagar, a suburb of Chennai, and is located 20 km north of Chennai Central railway station. It has an elevation of 4 m above sea level.

== History ==
The lines at the station were electrified on 13 April 1979, with the electrification of the Chennai Central–Gummidipoondi section.

== See also ==
- Chennai Suburban Railway
- Railway stations in Chennai
