= TNEB =

Electricity board of Tamil Nadu, India

Tamil Nadu Electricity Board (TNEB)
- Native name: EB
- Type: Public sector undertaking
- Traded as: TNEB
- Industry: Electric utility
- Predecessor: The Madras State Electricity Board; The Tamil Nadu Electricity Board
- Founded: 1 July 1957 as the Madras State Electricity Board; 1 November 2010 as TNEB Limited
- Founder: Government of Tamil Nadu
- Headquarters: Chennai, Tamil Nadu, India
- Area served: Tamil Nadu and Puducherry, India
- Products: Electricity
- Services: Utility and Power Distribution
- Revenue: ₹0 crore (US$0.00) (2016)
- Operating income: ▼₹−3.33 crore (US$−350,000) (2016)
- Net income: ▼₹−3.33 crore (US$−350,000) (2016)
- Total assets: ▲₹18,455.34 crore (US$1.9 billion) (2016)
- Owner: Department of Energy (Tamil Nadu), Government of Tamil Nadu
- Parent: Department of Energy (Tamil Nadu)
- Subsidiaries: TANTRANSCO; Tamil Nadu Power Generation Corporation Limited (TNPGCL); Tamil Nadu Power Distribution Corporation Limited (TNPDCL); Tamil Nadu Green Energy Corporation Limited (TNGECL)
- Website: www.tnebltd.org

Tamil Nadu Electricity Board (abbreviated as TNEB) is a power generation and distribution company owned by Government of Tamil Nadu, India. It was created as a regulated monopoly under section 131 of the Electricity Act (2003) as a successor of the erstwhile Tamil Nadu Electricity Board. It is the largest State Electricity Board (SEB) in the country in terms of number of consumers (30.75 million as of 31 March 2020).

== History ==
TNEB was formed on 1 July 1957 as the Madras State Electricity Board according to the Electricity Supply Act of 1948 as a successor to the erstwhile Electricity Department of the Government of Madras under the authority of the Department of Power. It was responsible for electricity generation, distribution and transmission, and it regulated the electricity supply in the state. Later it was renamed Tamil Nadu Electricity Board.

In October 2008, the Government of Tamil Nadu decided to divide TNEB into two subsidiaries. On 1 November 2010, TNEB Limited became a holding company with two subsidiaries, Tamil Nadu Generation and Distribution Corporation Limited (TANGEDCO), responsible for power generation, and Tamil Nadu Transmission Corporation Limited (TANTRANSCO), responsible for power transmission.
