= Ennore Creek =

Backwater in Chennai, India

Coordinates: 13°14′10″N 80°19′00″E

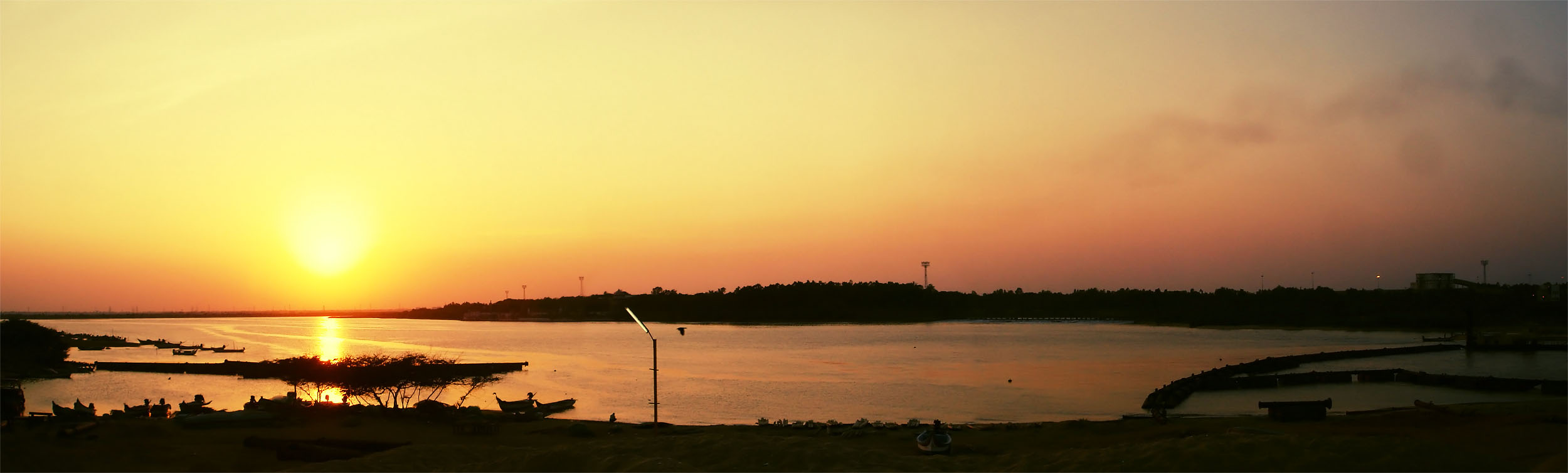
Sunset over the Ennore creek

Ennore Creek is a backwater located in Ennore, Chennai along the Coromandel Coast of the Bay of Bengal. It is located in the zone comprising lagoons with salt marshes and backwaters, submerged under water during high tide and forming an arm of the sea with the opening to the Bay of Bengal at the creek. The zone is spread over 4 km^{2}, and the creek covers an area of 2.25 km^{2}.

It is located 20 km north of the city centre and 2.6 km south of the Ennore Port; the creek area stretches 3 km into the sea and 5 km along the coast. The creek is nearly 400 m wide, elongated in northeast–southwest direction and merges with the backwater bodies. Once a flourishing mangrove swamp, the creek has been degraded to patches in the fringes mainly due to human activities in the region. The depth of the creek varies between 1 and 2 m and is shallow near the mouth. The north–south trending channels of the creek connect it with the Pulicat Lake to the north and with the distributaries of the Kosasthalaiyar River in the south. The northwestern part of the creek merges with the tidal flats. The soil in the region is loamy and alluvial. Most of the area consists of tracts of alluvial soil and the eastern region comprises beach dunes, tidal flats and creek. The creek is oriented from west to east and opens into the Bay of Bengal to the east at Ennore. The creek acts as an outlet for the excess water from the Poondi reservoir. The creek separates the town of Ennore from the Ennore Port located in the north and the Kattupalli Shipyard located further north.

The North Chennai Thermal Power Station is located to the north of the creek and the Ennore Thermal Power Station is located to the south. The creek is part of the Pulicat water system, including the Pulicat lagoon and the Buckingham Canal. As per the 1991 Coastal Regulation Zone notification, the entire Pulicat water system is designated CRZ I. The creek is experiencing siltation due to emergence of the Ennore Port.

== Ecology and drainage ==
According to the Department of Environment, the zone covers an area of 6,469 acres of the creek identified as a tidal waterbody protected as a No-Development zone under CRZ-I regulations.

The region is drained by a couple of seasonal rivers, namely, Araniar River flowing in the north and Kosasthalaiyar River passing through the creek, fed chiefly by the northeast monsoon and the cyclonic storms of the eastern coast between October and December and, to a lesser extent, by the southwest monsoon. The annual rainfall is about 1200 mm per annum and the temperature ranges from 25 °C to 40 °C. The water flow is scanty during most part of the year with occasional floods in the event of cyclonic storms. These rivers, which are source for groundwater recharge in the region, support several lakes found in the area.

Both the rivers do not reach the sea directly but confluence in the brackish water bodies, mangroves situated at the fringes of the creek and the Buckingham Canal. The Kosasthalaiyar River drains into the Ennore backwaters reaching the sea through the creek. The littoral currents moving in a northerly direction for 9 months from February till October transport the sediments and deposit them few kilometres off shore and, in an area of emergence, these strands form strand plains.

The mean wind speed in the region is about 4.7 m/s. The flux-level changes vary from 0.4 to 6 m^{3}/s/m^{2}. Surface elevation ranges from 0.2 to 0.6 m. The current velocity at the creek varies from 0.08 to 0.16 m/s during flood tides and from 0.2 to 0.15 m/s during ebb tides. At the mouth, the current velocity towards the east reaches a maximum of 0.5 m/s during flooding and 0.3 m/s during ebbing conditions.

The mangrove region found in the estuarine area supports a number of wildlife. The creek is surrounded by fishing villages, croplands and aquaculture ponds. Salt manufacturing, lime shell quarrying and fishing remains the chief occupations of the region. The northern part of the creek is connected to the biodiversity-rich Pulicat lagoon through the Buckingham Canal.

== Pollution ==
The creek receives wastewater from numerous sources including untreated wastewater and treated effluents from industrial sources in the surrounding area. Studies reveal that permitted discharges account for less than 40% of the total BOD load measured in the creek. Heavy metal concentrations are found to be higher near the creek mouth compared with the nearshore waters. Majority of heavy metal pollutants are likely to be present in a close proximity range of 0.5 km from the creek mouth after which there is a steady decline in their concentration up to 1.5 km.

In January 2017, a collision of two ships, Dawn Kanchipuram and BW Maple, at the Ennore Port resulted in an estimated 251.46 tonnes of oil spill.

== Developments ==
In 2000, an artificial beach nourishment (to prevent downdrift erosion) was taken up by placing 3.5 million m^{3} of sand dredged from the Ennore harbour basin and the approach channel through capital dredging.

A 670-m-long two-lane bridge is constructed on the creek by the Highway Department at a cost of ₹ 560 million, connecting Ennore High Road off the coastline with North Chennai Thermal Power Station at the northern end of the creek, with approach roads for about 1.7 km on either side of the Ennore High Road and near the thermal power station. The project, however, was proposed way back in 1997.

== See also ==
- Adyar Creek
- Birding in Chennai
- Kosasthalaiyar River
- Pallikaranai wetland
- Water management in Chennai
