= Tamil Nadu Transmission Corporation =

Government owned electric power transmission system

Tamil Nadu Transmission Corporation Limited (TANTRANSCO)
- Native name: தமிழ்நாடு மின் தொடரமைப்புக் கழகம் (வரையறுக்கப்பட்டது)
- Company type: Government-owned corporation
- Industry: Electric utility
- Predecessor: Tamil Nadu Electricity Board Electricity Transmission Wing
- Founded: October 1, 2010
- Headquarters: Chennai, Tamil Nadu, India
- Area served: Tamil Nadu, India
- Key people: Dr. J Radhakrishnan IAS Chairman; T.Sivakumar MD
- Services: Electric power transmission
- Revenue: ▲₹3,224.63 crore (US$340 million) (2018–19)
- Operating income: ▲₹626.65 crore (US$65 million) (2018–19)
- Net income: ▲₹−634.91 crore (US$−66 million) (2018–19)
- Total assets: ▲₹47,912.64 crore (US$5.0 billion) (2018–19)
- Total equity: ▲₹4,981.80 crore (US$520 million) (2018–19)
- Parent: TNEB Limited
- Website: www.tantransco.org

The Tamil Nadu Transmission Corporation Limited (TANTRANSCO) (Tamil: தமிழ்நாடு மின் தொடரமைப்புக் கழகம் (வரையறுக்கப்பட்டது)) is an electric power transmission system operator owned by Government of Tamil Nadu. It was established in November 2010, as a result of restructuring the Tamil Nadu Electricity Board. It is a subsidiary of TNEB Limited.

== Substations ==
The TANTRANSCO maintains all the substations in Tamil Nadu apart from the Power Grid Corporation of India Limited (PGCIL). These substations fall under one of the following categories:

- 400/230 kV substations.
- 230/110 kV substations.
- 110 kV substations.
- 33 kV substations.

less than this kV transmissions as 22 kV and 11 kV are used for distribution.

66/11 kV substations were in use earlier. This is no longer the case anymore.
