= Athipattu Pudunagar =

Athipattu Pudunagar, Chennai அத்திப்பட்டு புது நகர், சென்னை Athipattu Pudhu Nagar
- town
- Location within Chennai Location within Tamil Nadu Location within India
- Coordinates: 13.249721°N 80.299402°E
- Country: India
- State: Tamil Nadu
- District: Tiruvallur
- Elevation: 7 m (23 ft)

Languages
  - Official: Tamil
- Time zone: UTC+5:30 (IST)
- PIN: 600120
- Telephone code: 044
- Vehicle registration: TN 18
- Planning agency: CMDA
- City: Chennai
- Lok Sabha constituency: Thiruvallur
- Vidhan Sabha constituency: Ponneri

Athipattu Pudunagar [Acronym: ANT] (Tamil: அத்திப்பட்டு புது நகர் / அத்திப்பட்டு நியூ டவுன்) is a census town in Chennai at Thiruvallur district in the state of Tamil Nadu, India. It is to the north of Chennai city. The town is served by Athipattu Pudhunagar railway station of the Chennai Suburban Railway network. Special Industrial area of Tamil Nadu. Surrounded by Kamarajar Port, North Chennai Thermal Power Station, NTECL, India Cement, Zuari Cement, L&T Shipbuild, IOCL, HPCL, BPCL & more Container yard terminals.
