= Kutch Thermal Power Station =

Lignite based power plant in Gujarat

- Country: India
- Location: Panadhro, Kutch, Gujarat, India
- Coordinates: 23°39′45″N 68°47′02″E
- Status: Operational
- Commission date: 1990
- Operator: GSECL

Thermal power station
- Primary fuel: Lignite-Based

Power generation
- Units operational: 4
- Nameplate capacity: 290.00 MW

Kutch Lignite Thermal Power Station is Gujarat State Electricity Corporation Limited's only lignite based power plant.

== Power plant ==
Kachchh Lignite Thermal Power Station is located near Panadhro village in Lakhpat Taluka, Kutch district, Gujarat, India. The plant is adjacent to lignite mines (operated by Gujarat Mineral Development Corporation) and receives lignite directly from the mines. There are four units presently in operation.

KLTPS Unit-4 has the CFBC boiler which is first time introduced in GSECL.

== Installed capacity ==
| Stage | Unit number | Installed capacity (MW) | Date of commissioning | Status |
|---|---|---|---|---|
| Stage I | 1 | 70 | March 1990 | Decommission |
| Stage I | 2 | 70 | March, 1991 | Decommission |
| Stage I | 3 | 75 | March, 1997 | Running |
| Stage II | 4 | 75 | October, 2008 | Running |

== See also ==
- Gandhinagar Thermal Power Station
- Ukai Thermal Power Station
- Sikka Thermal Power Station
- Dhuvaran Thermal Power Station
- Wanakbori Thermal Power Station
