= List of shipwrecks in 1998 =

The list of shipwrecks in 1998 includes ships sunk, foundered, grounded, or otherwise lost during 1998.

table of contents
1998
Jan	Feb	Mar	Apr
May	Jun	Jul	Aug
Sep	Oct	Nov	Dec
Unknown date

== January ==
=== 1 January ===
List of shipwrecks: 1 January 1998
Ship	State	Description
Santa Anna	Panama	The tanker ran aground on Thatcher Rock, Torquay, Devon, United Kingdom.

=== 2 January ===
List of shipwrecks: 2 January 1998
Ship	State	Description
Fletwood Lady	Ireland	The fishing vessel capsized and sank at Howth, County Dublin. She was refloated on 10 January. Declared a constructive total loss, she was scrapped.

=== 3 January ===
List of shipwrecks: 3 January 1998
Ship	State	Description
Legasea	United States	A large catch of herring in the 51-foot (15.5 m) seiner′s nets sank, breaking her boom and causing her to capsize and sink in Eastern Channel near Sitka, Alaska. Her crew of five survived.

=== 4 January ===
List of shipwrecks: 4 January 1998
Ship	State	Description
Amanah	Malaysia	The cargo ship ran aground off Keelung, Taiwan. She subsequently broke in two and was a total loss.

=== 10 January ===
List of shipwrecks: 10 January 1998
Ship	State	Description
Orense	Argentina	The fishing vessel foundered.
Shinryo Maru No.75	Japan	The fishing vessel capsized and sank in the Pacific Ocean 150 nautical miles (280 km) north east of Nemuro. Two of her fifteen crew were reported missing.

=== 13 January ===
List of shipwrecks: 13 January 1998
Ship	State	Description
Altnes	Saint Vincent and the Grenadines	The bulk carrier collided with Shannon (Flag unknown) in the Kattegat (56°44′N 11°52′E). She capsized, sinking on 15 January. Her seventeen crew were rescued.

=== 15 January ===
List of shipwrecks: 15 January 1998
Ship	State	Description
New Baron	Panama	The cargo ship ran aground and sank off Ulsan, South Korea (35°22′N 129°22′E). Five of her crew were killed, twelve were reported missing. She was refloated on 20 August. Declared a constructive total loss, she was towed to Pusan, South Korea for scrapping.
Sunny Glory	Belize	The cargo ship ran aground off Kashima, Japan. Seven of her nine crew were rescued, two were reported missing. She was a total loss.

=== 16 January ===
List of shipwrecks: 16 January 1998
Ship	State	Description
Flare	Cyprus	The bulk carrier broke in two in severe weather and sank off Saint Pierre and Miquelon with the loss of 21 of her 25 crew.

=== 17 January ===
List of shipwrecks: 17 January 1998
Ship	State	Description
Agios Panteleimon	Honduras	The cargo ship foundered in the Mediterranean Sea south west of Sardinia, Italy (38°50′N 7°59′E) with the loss of two of her nine crew. Five people were reported missing.

=== 19 January ===
List of shipwrecks: 19 January 1998
Ship	State	Description
Audacious II	United Kingdom	The fishing vessel foundered in the Atlantic Ocean (57°24′N 13°46′W). Her crew were rescued.

=== 21 January ===
List of shipwrecks: 21 January 1998
Ship	State	Description
Solombala	Russia	The cargo ship capsized. She sank 20 nautical miles (37 km) off Korsakov on 23 January. Her twenty crew were rescued.

=== 23 January ===
List of shipwrecks: 23 January 1998
Ship	State	Description
Adriatic Sea	United States	The fishing vessel suffered a broken propeller shaft, which holed her and she sank 90 nautical miles (170 km) north of Tutuila, American Samoa. Her twenty crew were rescued.

=== 26 January ===
List of shipwrecks: 26 January 1998
Ship	State	Description
Dominion	United States	The 66-foot (20.1 m) salmon seiner capsized and sank in the Shelikof Strait off Cape Karluk (57°35′10″N 154°30′50″W) on the coast of Alaska's Kodiak Island after her catch shifted. Her crew of three survived.

=== 28 January ===
List of shipwrecks: 28 January 1998
Ship	State	Description
Hasan Bey	Turkey	the bulk carrier caught fire 10 nautical miles (19 km) off Euboea, Greece. She was towed to Aliağa Bay the next day. Declared a constructive total loss, she arrived at Aliağa on 28 February for scrapping.

=== 29 January ===
List of shipwrecks: 29 January 1998
Ship	State	Description
Yu Hwa No.2	Panama	The LPG tanker sank at Yeosu, South Korea (34°46′N 127°46′E). A crew member was reported missing. She was refloated on 3 February. Declared a constructive total loss, she arrived at Pusan, South Korean under tow on 25 February for scrapping.

=== 30 January ===
List of shipwrecks: 30 January 1998
Ship	State	Description
La Conte	United States	The 66-gross ton, 77.1-foot (23.5 m) longline fishing vessel sank in rough weather in the Gulf of Alaska approximately 60 nautical miles (110 km; 69 mi) west of Cape Spencer, Alaska, with the loss of two lives. A United States Coast Guard helicopter rescued her three survivors.

=== Unknown date ===
List of shipwrecks: Unknown date in January 1998
Ship	State	Description
Hsing Hua No.191	Equatorial Guinea	The fishing vessel caught fire and sank in the Indian Ocean.
Oktyabrskiy	Russia	The tanker foundered in the Ussuriyskiy Gulf.

== February ==
=== 1 February ===
List of shipwrecks: 1 February 1998
Ship	State	Description
Vegas	Estonia	The fishing vessel was sunk by ice in the Baltic Sea (59°15′N 22°18′E). Three of her five crew were reported missing.

=== 2 February ===
List of shipwrecks: 2 February 1998
Ship	State	Description
Delfin del Mediterra	Spain	The cargo ship foundered in the Mediterranean Sea (35°34′N 13°04′W) with the loss of one of her fourteen crew.
Dogruyollar IV	Turkey	The cargo ship foundered in the Mediterranean Sea off Cape Carbonara, Sicily, Italy (38°43′N 9°51′E). Her eleven crew were rescued.

=== 5 February ===
List of shipwrecks: 5 February 1998
Ship	State	Description
Antelope	Honduras	The cargo ship capsized and sank 28 nautical miles (52 km) south of Cape Irago, Japan (34°18′N 137°25′E) with the loss of four of her eight crew. One person was reported missing.
Mansei Maru No.21	Japan	The fishing vessel collided with Taian Maru No.128 (Japan) and sank in the Pacific Ocean (50°02′N 156°24′E).

=== 6 February ===
List of shipwrecks: 6 February 1998
Ship	State	Description
Elisa B.	Panama	The ro-ro ship caught fire off Las Palmas, Canary Islands. Her crew were rescued. She was consequently sold for scrapping.

=== 7 February ===
List of shipwrecks: 7 February 1998
Ship	State	Description
Fei Cui Hai	China	The bulk carrier foundered in the South China Sea (9°31′N 110°33′E). Four of her 34 crew were rescued. The rest were reported missing.

=== 8 February ===
List of shipwrecks: 8 February 1998
Ship	State	Description
Ha Thanh	Vietnam	The cargo ship ran aground off Shimonoseki, Japan (33°58′N 130°54′E). Her 21 crew were rescued by helicopter. She was refloated on 29 March. Declared a constructive total loss, she was taken to Wakamatsu, Japan for scrapping.

=== 11 February ===
List of shipwrecks: 11 February 1998
Ship	State	Description
Alaska I	United States	The fishing vessel collided with the container ship Hanjin Barcelona (Panama and sank in the Bering Sea 34 nautical miles (63 km) north of Dutch Harbor, Alaska. Her 33 crew were rescued.
Kamiji	Japan	The ro-ro ship foundered in the Pacific Ocean (34°02′N 134°28′E).

=== 12 February ===
List of shipwrecks: 13 February 1998
Ship	State	Description
Maria Teresa Rodrigu	Spain	The fishing vessel off the coast of Mauritania.
Tomiei Maru No.18	Japan	The dredger foundered off Hiwasa Cape.

=== 13 February ===
List of shipwrecks: 13 February 1998
Ship	State	Description
Agan	Russia	The cargo ship foundered in the Sea of Japan 100 nautical miles (190 km) off Ulleungdo, South Korea with the loss of four of her fifteen crew.
Leona I	Liberia	The offshore supply vessel collided with the container ship Kano (Flag unknown) and sank at Dakar, Senegal. She was refloated on 31 July and scuttled.

=== 14 February ===
List of shipwrecks: 14 February 1998
Ship	State	Description
Beg	Belize	The cargo ship foundered off Poti, Georgia. Her five crew were reported missing.

=== 15 February ===
List of shipwrecks: 15 February 1998
Ship	State	Description
Evangeline	United States	While trying to anchor southwest of Montague Island off the south-central coast of Alaska, the 46-foot (14.0 m) longline cod-fishing vessel struck rocks and capsized in the surf. Her crew of three survived.
Geir Peder	Norway	The fishing vessel foundered in the Barents Sea 27 nautical miles (50 km) north north west of Vardo (70°49′N 30°57′E) with the loss of one of her twelve crew.
Oaxaca	United States	The 36-foot (11.0 m) crab-fishing vessel was wrecked in Glacier Bay in Southeast Alaska. Her crew of two survived.

=== 16 February ===
List of shipwrecks: 16 February 1998
Ship	State	Description
Emma Arline	United States	The 38-foot (11.6 m) salmon troller was wrecked in Southeast Alaska approximately 10 nautical miles (19 km; 12 mi) north of Petersburg, Alaska. The two people aboard survived.

=== 17 February ===
List of shipwrecks: 17 February 1998
Ship	State	Description
Marie Bouanga	Democratic Republic of the Congo	The cargo ship collided with Zircone (Italy) near Borkum Riff, Germany (53°48′N 6°21′E). She was declared a constructive total loss and subsequently scrapped at Ghent, East Flanders, Belgium.

=== 22 February ===
List of shipwrecks: 22 February 1998
Ship	State	Description
Adria	Romania	The cargo ship caught fire in the Mediterranean Sea off Casablanca, Morocco (34°43′N 7°11′W) with the loss of three of her sixteen crew. She was towed in to Cádiz, Spain, then to Puerto de Santa Maria, where she arrived on 26 February. Declared a constructive total loss, she was consequently scrapped.
SLNS Pabbatha	Sri Lanka Navy	Sri Lankan Civil War: The landing ship was sunk by the Liberation Tigers of Tamil Eelam.
Platon	Saint Vincent and the Grenadines	The bulk carrier collided with Trust 38 (Singapore) in the Indian Ocean (34°24′S 25°33′E). Platon put in to Port Elizabeth, South Africa, where she was declared a constructive total loss. She arrived at Alang, India under tow on 31 December for scrapping.

=== 25 February ===
List of shipwrecks: 25 February 1998
Ship	State	Description
Laura	France	The cargo ship foundered in the Pacific Ocean (10°27′S 136°55′E). Her eleven crew were rescued.
Sundari	India	The cargo ship foundered 4 nautical miles (7.4 km) off the mouth of the Dhanu River, Bangladesh (20°02′N 72°36′E).

=== 26 February ===
List of shipwrecks: 26 February 1998
Ship	State	Description
Florida Seahorse	[[|]]	The tug foundered in the Atlantic Ocean (29°00′N 90°34′W). Her five crew were rescued.
San Mames Dos	Spain	The cargo ship was reported lost on this date.
Sota Poveda	Spain	The cargo ship was reported lost on this date.

=== 27 February ===
List of shipwrecks: 27 February 1998
Ship	State	Description
Usund	Norway	The cargo ship foundered in the North Sea 16 nautical miles (30 km) off Lista with the loss of two of her seven crew. The rest were reported missing.

== March ==
=== 2 March ===
List of shipwrecks: 2 March 1998
Ship	State	Description
Nafti	Liberia	The chemical tanker suffered a flooded engine room at Tsing Yi, Hong Kong. She was declared a constructive total loss and scrapped.

=== 3 March ===
List of shipwrecks: 3 March 1998
Ship	State	Description
Capitaine Cook	France	The fishing vessel foundered.

=== 10 March ===
List of shipwrecks: 10 March 1998
Ship	State	Description
Golden Union	Malta	The cargo ship sprang a leak off Port St. Johns, South Africa (31°41′S 29°34′E). Her 33 crew were rescued. She was towed in to Cape Town, South Africa on 28 March. Declared a constructive total loss, she arrived at Alang, India on 14 February 1999 for scrapping.
Soho Maru Noo.31	Japan	The fishing vessel foundered in the Pacific Ocean (44°27′N 147°59′E).

=== 14 March ===
List of shipwrecks: 14 March 1998
Ship	State	Description
Alga	Russia	The cargo ship capsized and sank at Nakhodka. She was refloated on 26 March. Declared a constructive total loss, she was scrapped in May.

=== 17 March ===
List of shipwrecks: 17 March 1998
Ship	State	Description
Peix Del Mar Seite	Spain	The fishing vessel capsized and sank in the Atlantic Ocean 38 nautical miles (70 km) off Agadir, Morocco (30°55′N 10°15′W). Five of her fifteen crew were rescued, the rest were reported missing.

=== 20 March ===
List of shipwrecks: 20 March 1998
Ship	State	Description
Danakos I	Panama	The bulk carrier ran aground off Montevideo, Uruguay. She was refloated and put in to Montevideo. Declared a constructive total loss, she arrived at Alang, India on 20 July for scrapping.

=== 21 March ===
List of shipwrecks: 21 March 1998
Ship	State	Description
Dahlia	South Africa	The fishing vessel foundered in the Atlantic Ocean 27 nautical miles (50 km) south of Cape Point (34°42′S 18°08′E). Her crew survived.

=== 23 March ===
List of shipwrecks: 23 March 1998
Ship	State	Description
Demetrios II	Honduras	Demetrios II aground The cargo ship ran aground 3 nautical miles (5.6 km) off the Paphos Lighthouse, Greece (34°47′N 32°23′E) in bad weather. All eight crew were rescued by helicopter. She was a total loss.

=== 26 March ===
List of shipwrecks: 26 March 1998
Ship	State	Description
Autobahn	Norway	The ro-ro ship lost her rudder in the Mediterranean Sea (36°31′N 22°07′E). She was towed in to Piraeus, Greece on 29 March. Declared a constructive total loss, She arrived at Aliağa, Turkey on 17 April for scrapping.

=== 27 March ===
List of shipwrecks: 27 March 1998
Ship	State	Description
Loretta C	United States	The 36-foot (11.0 m) longline halibut-fishing vessel was destroyed in the harbor at Petersburg, Alaska, by a fire that began in a stove.

=== 29 March ===
List of shipwrecks: 31 March 1998
Ship	State	Description
Kubanskiy Rybak	Russia	The fishing vessel ran aground on Bear Island, Norway (74°29′N 18°45′E). Her 30 crew were rescued.

=== 31 March ===
List of shipwrecks: 31 March 1998
Ship	State	Description
Kol-181	Poland	The fishing vessel collided with the ferry Kaunas (Panama) and sank 13 nautical miles (24 km) east of Bornholm, Denmark (54°57′N 15°30′E). Her eight crew were rescued.

=== Unknown date ===
List of shipwrecks: Unknown date in March 1998
Ship	State	Description
Giuseppina	Ethiopia	The cargo ship was wrecked at Massawa, Eritrea.

== April ==
=== 4 April ===
List of shipwrecks: 4 April 1998
Ship	State	Description
Ocean Way	Canada	The fishing vessel foundered in the Atlantic Ocean (47°55′N 52°58′W). Her ten crew were rescued.

=== 7 April ===
List of shipwrecks: 7 April 1998
Ship	State	Description
USS Hull	United States Navy	The decommissioned Forrest Sherman-class destroyer was sunk as a target in the Pacific Ocean off the United States West Coast at 32°35′00.9″N 120°32′00.3″W.
Inzhener Gulyayev	Ukraine	The tanker was driven ashore at Al Mamzar, Dubai. She was refloated and towed to Port Rashid, where she was beached. She was a total loss.

=== 8 April ===
List of shipwrecks: 8 April 1998
Ship	State	Description
Faithful III	United Kingdom	The fishing vessel collided with the fishing trawler Challenge II (United Kingdom) and sank in the Atlantic Ocean off Rockall (57°22′N 14°54′W). Her six crew were rescued.
Gamma	Belize	The cargo ship was damaged by ice in the Gulf of Finland. She was towed to Vysotsk, Russia. Her crew were taken off by an icebreaker. Declared a constructive total loss, she arrived at Bilbao, Spain on 15 June for scrapping.

=== 9 April ===
List of shipwrecks: 9 April 1998
Ship	State	Description
Cathy	United States	The 38-foot (11.6 m) salmon troller was destroyed by fire in Sitka Sound in Southeast Alaska. Her crew of two survived.

=== 10 April ===
List of shipwrecks: 10 April 1998
Ship	State	Description
Chian Mariner	Liberia	The bulk carrier foundered in the Atlantic Ocean 160 nautical miles (300 km) off the coast of Angola (16°58′34″S 9°06′30″E). Her 25 crew were rescued.
Don Mario	Honduras	The cargo ship foundered in the Atlantic Ocean 300 nautical miles (560 km) off Gibraltar (36°46′N 0°14′W). Fourteen of her crew were rescued, three were reported missing.
Sir Michael	Panama	The bulk carrier ran aground on a reef in the Gulf of Aqaba. She was refloated and made for Djibouti for repairs, but sprang a leak and was beached at Assab, Eritrea on 15 April. She was a total loss.

=== 15 April ===
List of shipwrecks: 15 April 1998
Ship	State	Description
Lyn	Denmark	The cargo ship foundered in the Bay of Biscay 60 nautical miles (110 km) off A Coruña, Spain (42°32′N 9°23′W). Her crew were rescued.

=== 16 April ===
List of shipwrecks: 16 April 1998
Ship	State	Description
Sumaqu	United States	The 105-foot (32 m) fish tender burned and sank in Chatham Strait in the Alexander Archipelago near Tenakee Springs in Southeast Alaska. Her crew of two survived.

=== 18 April ===
List of shipwrecks: 22 April 1998
Ship	State	Description
Yamakuni Maru No.3	Japan	The cargo ship collided with the chemical tanker Nissho Maru (Japan) in the Inland Sea of Japan. She was towed in to Yanai. Declared a constructive total loss, she was towed to Kure for scrapping.

=== 19 April ===
List of shipwrecks: 19 April 1998
Ship	State	Description
Anna Maria H.	Malta	The cargo ship suffered an engine failure 300 nautical miles (560 km) north west of Cape Town, South Africa. She was towed in to Cape Town on 23 April. Declared a constructive total loss, she arrived at Alang, India on 8 October for scrapping.

=== 22 April ===
List of shipwrecks: 22 April 1998
Ship	State	Description
Ferman Silver	Turkey	The chemical tanker ran aground at Çeşme. She was refloated with the assistance of a tug on 29 April. Declared a constructive total loss, she arrived at Aliağa on22 August for scrapping.

=== 23 April ===
List of shipwrecks: 23 April 1998
Ship	State	Description
Sirius	Belize	The cargo ship collided with the sand carrier Yushin Maru No.8 (Japan) and sank off Moji, Japan (33°56′N 131°03′E). Her 8 crew were rescued. She was refloated on 22 August. Declared a constructive total loss, she arrived at Pusan, South Korea on 23 August for scrapping.

=== 25 April ===
List of shipwrecks: 25 April 1998
Ship	State	Description
Rema	Belize	The cargo ship foundered in the North Sea (54°42′N 0°08′W). Her five crew were reported missing.

=== 26 April ===
List of shipwrecks: 26 April 1998
Ship	State	Description
Evanick	United States	After the 36-gross ton, 50-foot (15.2 m) fishing vessel's EPIRB sent a distress signal, a United States Coast Guard helicopter found her capsized south of the Shelikof Strait near the south coast of the Alaska Peninsula in Alaska 17 nautical miles (31 km; 20 mi) east-southeast of Cape Providence (54°47′N 156°17′W). She later sank in 612 feet (187 m) of water. The bodies of the four men aboard were never found.

=== 29 April ===
List of shipwrecks: 29 April 1998
Ship	State	Description
Elisa B.	Panama	The ro-ro ship foundered in the Atlantic Ocean (33°42′36″N 7°58′30″W).
Tae Chon	North Korea	The cargo ship collided with Yang Lin (China) and sank in the Yellow Sea. One of her 36 crew was reported missingv.

== May ==
=== 7 May ===
List of shipwrecks: 7 May 1998
Ship	State	Description
Riptide	United States	The 8-gross ton, 32-foot (9.8 m) longline cod-fishing vessel burned and sank in Amee Bay (57°12′30″N 153°11′30″W) near Old Harbor, Alaska. The fishing vessel Sarah M (United States) rescued all three members of her crew.

=== 16 May ===
List of shipwrecks: 16 May 1998
Ship	State	Description
Lorvon	United States	The 50-foot (15.2 m) longline halibut-fishing vessel sank in the Bering Sea northeast of Umnak Island in the Aleutian Islands 2 nautical miles (3.7 km; 2.3 mi) east of Cape Tanak (53°33′50″N 168°00′00″W). The fishing vessel Heritage (United States) rescued her three-member crew from a life raft.
St. Michael	Malta	The tug was scuttled in the Mediterranean Sea off Marsaskala as an artificial reef.
Tug No. 10	Malta	The tug was scuttled in the Mediterranean Sea off Marsaskala as an artificial reef.

=== 18 May ===
List of shipwrecks: 18 May 1998
Ship	State	Description
Bonnie Gale	United States	The 33-foot (10.1 m) gillnet salmon-fishing vessel sank at the mouth of the Copper River on the south-central coast of Alaska during a gale. The only person aboard survived.
Christopher A	United States	The 30-foot (9.1 m) gillnet salmon-fishing vessel was wrecked at the mouth of the Copper River on the south-central coast of Alaska during a gale. Her crew of two survived.

=== 19 May ===
List of shipwrecks: 19 May 1998
Ship	State	Description
Hakata	Panama	The ro-ro ship collided with Amur (Sierra Leone) 8 nautical miles (15 km) off Sangbaek Island, South Korea and sank with the loss of two of her 21 crew.

=== 20 May ===
List of shipwrecks: 20 May 1998
Ship	State	Description
Wanda	Denmark	The fishing vessel foundered in the Baltic Sea (55°14′N 15°39′E). Her three crew were rescued.

=== 21 May ===
List of shipwrecks: 21 May 1998
Ship	State	Description
Al Jawaher	Panama	The ro-ro ship caught fire at Suez, Egypt. Declared a constructive total loss, she was scrapped at Adabiya, Egypt.

=== 23 May ===
List of shipwrecks: 23 May 1998
Ship	State	Description
Caytrans Caribe	Belize	The cargo ship sprang a leak in the Caribbean Sea (15°28′24″N 72°30′12″W). Her crew were rescued and she was presumed to have subsequently foundered.

=== 28 May ===
List of shipwrecks: 28 May 1998
Ship	State	Description
Merit	United States	The 32-foot (9.8 m) salmon gillnet fishing vessel was destroyed by fire in Prince William Sound on the south-central coast of Alaska near Port Nellie Juan (60°33′00″N 148°09′45″W). Her crew of two survived.

=== 30 May ===
List of shipwrecks: 30May 1998
Ship	State	Description
Manuel Belgrano	Liberia	The LPG tanker ran aground in the Indian Ocean (21°50′N 72°28′E) and became hogged. She was a total loss.

== June ==
=== 2 June ===
List of shipwrecks: 2 June 1998
Ship	State	Description
Dove	United States	The 30-foot (9.1 m) salmon gillnetter capsized in the surf and was lost off the Kokinhenik Bar (60°18′30″N 145°05′00″W) in the Copper River Flats on the south-central coast of Alaska. The only person aboard perished.

=== 3 June ===
List of shipwrecks: 3 June 1998
Ship	State	Description
Sea Star	Denmark	The cargo ship collided with the fishing vessel Masayoshi Maru No.8 (Japan) and sank in the Caribbean Sea (11°41′N 74°53′W). Two of her seven crew were reported missing.

=== 4 June ===
List of shipwrecks: 4 June 1998
Ship	State	Description
Cheechako	United States	The 36-foot (11.0 m) longline halibut-fishing vessel burned and sank approximately 14 nautical miles (26 km; 16 mi) southwest of Ninilchik, Alaska.

=== 6 June ===
List of shipwrecks: 6 June 1998
Ship	State	Description
Sudur Havid	South Africa	The longline-fishing vessel was lost 160 nautical miles (300 km)) west of South Georgia (53°55′00″S 41°24′00″W) when pumps were unable to keep up with water that swept over the ship in a storm. Twenty-one Survivors were picked up by other vessels but seventeen other crew members did not survive.

=== 7 June ===
List of shipwrecks: 7 June 1998
Ship	State	Description
Yoshi Maru No.28	Japan	The fishing vessel foundered off Hachijo-Jima.

=== 9 June ===
List of shipwrecks: 9 June 1998
Ship	State	Description
Alexanderturm	Liberia	The offshore supply vessel caught fire in the Atlantic Ocean. She was on a voyage from Cape Town, South Africa to Luanda, Anglola. She was towed in to Walvis Bay on 15 June. Declared a constructive total loss, she was consequently scrapped.
Datec	Singapore	The tug sank at Mundra, India in a cyclone. She was subsequently refloated, towed out to sea, and scuttled.
Golden Harvest	Saint Vincent and the Grenadines	The bulk carrier foundered in the Indian Ocean (21°21′N 68°18′E) in a cyclone. Her 21 crew were reported missing.
Gutec	Singapore	The tug was wrecked off Pirotan Island, India during a cyclone.
Hualien Express	Saint Vincent and the Grenadines	The cargo ship ran aground at Kandla, India. She was refloated on 8 August; the salvage was completed on 18 August and she was then sold for scrapping.
Orinoco	India	The tug foundered in the Indian Ocean 8 to 10 nautical miles (15 to 19 km) off Sikka during a cyclone with the loss of all hands.
Pearl	United States	The 26-foot (7.9 m) gillnet salmon-fishing vessel capsized and sank in the Copper River Flats in Southcentral Alaska. The only person aboard perished.
Roshni	Saint Vincent and the Grenadines	The cargo ship foundered in the Indian Ocean 100 nautical miles (190 km) off Sikka, India during a cyclone. Her crew were rescued.

=== 11 June ===
List of shipwrecks: 11 June 1998
Ship	State	Description
Indian Courier	India	The container ship ran aground off Pipavav (20°59′N 71°34′E). She was a total loss.
Mert	Turkey	The cargo ship ran aground in the Indian Ocean (17°26′N 55°16′E).

=== 13 June ===
List of shipwrecks: 13 June 1998
Ship	State	Description
Alimad	Syria	The cargo ship capsized and sank off Mukalla, Yemen (14°31′N 49°08′E). Her nineteen crew were rescued.

=== 14 June ===
List of shipwrecks: 14 June 1998
Ship	State	Description
Silvery Sea	United Kingdom	The fishing vessel collided with Merkur (Flag unknown) and sank in the North Sea 30 nautical miles (56 km) east of Esbjerg, Denmark (55°25′N 7°27′E). Her five crew were reported missing.

=== 15 June ===
List of shipwrecks: 15 June 1998
Ship	State	Description
Hualien Express	Saint Vincent and the Grenadines	The cargo ship collided with other vessels and was driven ashore at Kandla, India during a cyclone. She was later refloated. Declared a constructive total loss, she arrived at Sachana, India in August for scrapping.
Pearl of Dammam	Saint Vincent and the Grenadines	The bulk carrier was driven ashore at Kandla during a cyclone. Declared a constructive total loss, she arrived at Alang, India on 12 September for scrapping.
Velenje	Saint Vincent and the Grenadines	The cargo ship was driven ashore at Kandla during a cyclone. She was refloated on 11 August. Declared a constructive total loss, she arrived at Alang on 21 November for scrapping.

=== 16 June ===
List of shipwrecks: 16 June 1998
Ship	State	Description
Angela B	United States	The 30-foot (9.1 m) gillnet salmon-fishing vessel was destroyed in Bristol Bay off the coast of Alaska by a fire that started in her engine room. Her crew of three survived.

=== 20 June ===
List of shipwrecks: 20 June 1998
Ship	State	Description
Dawning Star	United States	The fishing vessel suffered an explosion in her engine room and foundered in the Pacific Ocean 206 nautical miles (382 km) south west of Honolulu, Hawaii. Her four crew were rescued.

=== 23 June ===
List of shipwrecks: 23 June 1998
Ship	State	Description
Unidentified submarine	Korean People's Navy	The Yugo-class submarine became entangled in the nets of a South Korean fishing trawler and was subsequently taken in tow by Republic of Korea Navy vessels. The submarine sank with the loss of all eight crew.

=== 25 June ===
List of shipwrecks: 25 June 1998
Ship	State	Description
Bahana Nunsantara	Indonesia	The cargo ship foundered in the Alas Strait with the loss of five of the 95 people on board. Forty-six people were reported missing.
Yenducer	United States	The 32-foot (9.8 m) gillnet salmon-fishing vessel was destroyed by an engine room fire in Bristol Bay off Alaska. Her entire crew of three survived.

=== 28 June ===
List of shipwrecks: 28 June 1998
Ship	State	Description
World Peace	Cyprus	The cargo ship foundered in the Indian Ocean (11°26′N 62°51′E). Her 21 crew were rescued.

=== 29 June ===
List of shipwrecks: 29 June 1998
Ship	State	Description
Wooyang Honey	South Korea	The cargo ship foundered in the South China Sea (23°00′N 116°35′E). Her sixteen crew were rescued.

== July ==
=== 3 July ===
List of shipwrecks: 3 July 1998
Ship	State	Description
Meng Kiat	Singapore	The cargo ship was driven ashore at Vasal, India. She was being towed to Alang, India for scrapping. The wreck was plundered by the local inhabitants.

=== 7 July ===
List of shipwrecks: 7 July 1998
Ship	State	Description
Tiger Force	Malta	The cargo ship foundered in the Indian Ocean 35 nautical miles (65 km) off Colombo, Sri Lanka. Her eighteen crew were rescued.

== =8 July ==
List of shipwrecks: 8 July 1998
Ship	State	Description
Shinsei Maru No.8	Japan	The cargo ship collided with the tanker Isoprene Maru No.2 (Japan) and sank 2.5 nautical miles (4.6 km) off the Noshimakashi Lighthouse. Her crew were rescued.

=== 9 July ===
List of shipwrecks: 9 July 1998
Ship	State	Description
Tadoussac	Canada	The lake freighter ran aground in the St. Clair River. The vessel was carrying a load of coal and required five tugboats to free the ship.

=== 10 July ===
List of shipwrecks: 10 July 1998
Ship	State	Description
Rothenbach II	United States	The retired 165-foot (50.3 m) gasoline barge was scuttled as an artificial reef in the North Atlantic Ocean 7.2 nautical miles (13.3 km; 8.3 mi) off Atlantic City, New Jersey, at 39°14.498′N 074°21.483′W.

=== 13 July ===
List of shipwrecks: 16 July 1998
Ship	State	Description
Rautz	Austria	The cargo ship foundered in the Atlantic Ocean 120 nautical miles (220 km) north of Cape St. Vincent, Portugal (35°07′N 9°17′W). Six of her ten crew were rescued, the rest were reported missing.

=== 16 July ===
List of shipwrecks: 16 July 1998
Ship	State	Description
USS YW-127	United States Navy	The decommissioned 165-foot (50.3 m) water barge was scuttled as an artificial reef in 125 feet (38 m) of water in the North Atlantic Ocean off New Jersey at 40°06.419′N 073°41.460′W. Her wreck was named "Mako Mania."

=== 19 July ===
List of shipwrecks: 19 July 1998
Ship	State	Description
Nerka II	United States	The 32-foot (9.8 m) gillnet salmon-fishing vessel was destroyed by fire at Naknek, Alaska. The only person on board survived.

=== 21 July ===
List of shipwrecks: 21 July 1998
Ship	State	Description
Osool	Belize	The bulk carrier foundered in the Indian Ocean 280 nautical miles (520 km) south west of Mumbai, India. Her crew were rescued.

=== 22 July ===
List of shipwrecks: 22 July 1998
Ship	State	Description
USS Badger	United States Navy	The decommissioned Knox-class frigate was sunk as a target by units of the United States Third Fleet (United States Navy) during the RIMPAC 98 exercise.
Louanna	Namibia	The fishing vessel foundered in the Atlantic Ocean (23°44′S 14°04′E). Her thirteen crew were rescued.
Sir Raphael	Belize	The hijacked offshore supply vessel ran aground in the River Gee, Nigeria. She was refloated in November.
USS Somers	United States Navy	After use as a target for two AGM-142 Have Nap missiles fired by two United States Air Force B-52 Stratofortress aircraft the previous day during the RIMPAC 98 exercise, the decommissioned Forrest Sherman-class destroyer was sunk in the Pacific Ocean northwest of Kauai, Hawaii, at 22°21′N 160°58′W by explosive charges placed by an explosive ordnance disposal team.

=== 23 July ===
List of shipwrecks: 23 July 1998
Ship	State	Description
Costa de la Luz	Spain	The fishing vessel foundered.
Eurasian Dream	Philippines	The ro-ro ship caught fire at Sharjah, United Arab Emirates. The fire was extinguished on 26 July. Declared a constructive total loss, she arrived at Panyu, China on 9 December for scrapping.

=== 24 July ===
List of shipwrecks: 26 July 1998
Ship	State	Description
Shkval	Ukraine	The fishing vessel suffered an onboard explosion and sank in the Black Sea with the loss of eight crew.

=== 26 July ===
List of shipwrecks: 26 July 1998
Ship	State	Description
Smyrni	Cyprus	The bulk carrier was run into by the container ship Elisabeth Rickmers (Antigua and Barbuda) at Santos, Brazil. Declared a constructive total loss, she arrived at Niterói, Brazil on 4 October for scrapping.

=== 27 July ===
List of shipwrecks: 27 July 1998
Ship	State	Description
Courtesan	United States	The retired 34-foot (10.4 m) sailboat was scuttled as an artificial reef in the North Atlantic Ocean off Fire Island south of Long Island, New York.

=== 28 July ===
List of shipwrecks: 28 July 1998
Ship	State	Description
Tadoussac	Canada	The lake freighter ran aground on a sandbank in Lake Erie near Detroit, Michigan.

=== 29 July ===
List of shipwrecks: 29 July 1998
Ship	State	Description
Dong Yeong No.310	South Korea	The fishing vessel caught fire and sank in the Atlantic Ocean (49°05′52″S 45°07′00″W). Her 33 crew were rescued.

=== 30 July ===
List of shipwrecks: 30 July 1998
Ship	State	Description
Rachel Colleen	United States	The 59-foot (18 m) salmon seiner was destroyed by fire in Cordova Bay in Southeast Alaska. Her entire crew of six survived.

=== 31 July ===
List of shipwrecks: 31 July 1998
Ship	State	Description
Argo	United States	Wearing survival suits, the two-person crew of the 50-foot (15 m) halibut-fishing vessel abandoned ship after she caught fire in the Bering Sea 15 nautical miles (28 km; 17 mi) off Dutch Harbor, Alaska. They survived. After arriving on the scene and witnessing an explosion blow Argo's deck off, the medium endurance cutter USCGC Storis ( United States Coast Guard) deemed Argo a hazard to navigation and sank her.
Leona I	Liberia	The offshore supply vessel was scuttled off the coast of Senegal.

=== Unknown date ===
List of shipwrecks: Unknown date in July 1998
Ship	State	Description
Discovery Bay	United Kingdom	The container ship suffered boiler problems at Sydney, New South Wales, Australia in mid-July. Declared a constructive total loss, she arrived at Alang, India on 7 September for scrapping.
Odissey-4	Russia	The fishing vessel sank at Kholmsk.

== August ==
=== 3 August ===
List of shipwrecks: 3 August 1998
Ship	State	Description
Sea Dream	Greece	The bulk carrier caught fire in the Atlantic Ocean 200 nautical miles (370 km) off Dakar, Senegal. She was subsequently towed in to Gibraltar, where she was declared a total loss.

=== 4 August ===
List of shipwrecks: 4 August 1998
Ship	State	Description
Denisse Marie	Venezuela	The cargo ship ran aground in Puerto Escondido Bay (12°10′30″N 69°57′48″W) and was abandoned by her crew. She was a total loss.

=== 7 August ===
List of shipwrecks: 7 August 1998
Ship	State	Description
Night Rider	United States	The 31-foot (9.4 m) gillnet salmon-fishing vessel was destroyed by fire in Stepovak Bay on the Gulf of Alaska coast of the Alaska Peninsula. The only person aboard survived.

=== 8 August ===
List of shipwrecks: 8 August 1998
Ship	State	Description
Unnamed tanker	United States	The 85-foot (25.9 m) bow section of the incomplete tanker was scuttled as an artificial reef in the North Atlantic Ocean 3.6 nautical miles (6.7 km; 4.1 mi) off Sea Girt, New Jersey, in 70 feet (21 m) of water at 40°07.750′N 073°56.345′W. The wreck is nicknamed "Ocean Wreck Divers IV" and "The Bow."

=== 9 August ===
List of shipwrecks: 9 August 1998
Ship	State	Description
Melanie M.	Cambodia	The cargo ship sprang a leak in the Red Sea (18°58′N 13°15′E). Her crew were resued. She was presumed to have subsequently foundered.
USS Richmond K. Turner	United States Navy	The decommissioned Leahy-class guided-missile cruiser was sunk as a target off Puerto Rico by ships and aircraft of the USS Enterprise carrier battle group (United States Navy).

=== 11 August ===
List of shipwrecks: 18 August 1998
Ship	State	Description
Perseus	Malta	The cargo ship, which had caught fire on 4 August, foundered in the Indian Ocean (12°33′N 47°47′E). Her 25 crew were rescued.

=== 14 August ===
List of shipwrecks: 14 August 1998
Ship	State	Description
Princess Kash	Belize	Sri Lankan civil war: The cargo ship was bombed by the Sri Lankan Air Force off Mullaitivu, Sri Lanka. Her 21 crew were rescued.

=== 18 August ===
List of shipwrecks: 18 August 1998
Ship	State	Description
Jackie-R	United States	The 49-foot (14.9 m) salmon seiner capsized and sank in Square Cove (57°58′40″N 134°45′45″W) on the west coast of Admiralty Island in Chatham Strait in the Alexander Archipelago in Southeast Alaska when fish on her deck shifted during a haul. Her crew of five abandoned ship in a skiff and was rescued.

=== 19 August ===
List of shipwrecks: 19 August 1998
Ship	State	Description
ARA Comodoro Somellera	Argentine Navy	The Sotoyomo-class rescue tug sank after colliding during a storm with the patrol tug ARA Suboficial Castillo (Argentine Navy) in port at Ushuaia, Argentina. She later was refloated and scrapped.

=== 25 August ===
List of shipwrecks: 25 August 1998
Ship	State	Description
Sin Fin Dos	Ghana	The fishing vessel was lost.

=== 26 August ===
List of shipwrecks: 26 August 1998
Ship	State	Description
King Jimmy	Sierra Leone	The tanker foundered in the Atlantic Ocean 15 nautical miles (28 km) off Freetown.
Sea Prospect	Panama	The bulk carrier capsized and sank off Okinawa, Japan (24°29′N 130°37′E). Eleven of her 21 crew were rescued, the rest were reported missing.

=== Unknown date ===
List of shipwrecks: Unknown date in August 1998
Ship	State	Description
Asean Carrier	Panama	The bulk carrier foundered in the Arabian Sea on or about 3 April. Her 22 crew were rescued.

== September ==
=== 1 September ===
List of shipwrecks: 1 September 1998
Ship	State	Description
Fighter I	Belize	The cargo ship sprang a leak in the Mediterranean Sea 40 nautical miles (74 km) south west of Paphos, Cyprus (35°19′N 31°43′E). Her ten crew were rescued. She was towed in to Latchi, Cyprus on 4 September. Declared a constructive total loss, she arrived at Aliağa, Turkey on 8 December for scrapping.
Kaptan Sukru	Turkey	The cargo ship caught fire off Rize and was beached at Ardeşen. Declared a total loss, she was scrapped in situ.

=== 2 September ===
List of shipwrecks: 2 September 1998
Ship	State	Description
Um El Faroud	Libya	The wreck of Um El Faroud on 21 June 2014 The oil tanker was scuttled in the Mediterranean Sea off Wied iż-Żurrieq, Malta, as an artificial reef. She had been laid up in Grand Harbour, Malta, since 1995, when she had suffered an explosion that killed nine Maltese dockyard workers.

=== 6 September ===
List of shipwrecks: 6 September 1998
Ship	State	Description
Skarvoy	Belize	The fishing vessel foundered in the Atlantic Ocean (15°45′N 23°45′W). Her crew were rescued.

=== 7 September ===
List of shipwrecks: 7 September 1998
Ship	State	Description
Enso Kodiak II	United States	The offshore supply vessel capsized and sank in the Gulf of Mexico approximately 180 nautical miles (330 km) south of New Orleans, Louisiana (29°17′N 89°03′W). Her seventeen crew were rescued.
Rosemount	United Kingdom	The fishing vessel sank in the North Sea 170 nautical miles (310 km) north east of Aberdeen (59°20′N 1°24′E). Her seven crew were rescued.

=== 8 September ===
List of shipwrecks: 8 September 1998
Ship	State	Description
Hansia	Denmark	The dredger capsized and sank off Anholt. Her crew were rescued.

=== 9 September ===
List of shipwrecks: 9 September 1998
Ship	State	Description
Sekavin 3	Panama	The tug struck a floating object and foudered in the Persian Gulf 48 nautical miles (89 km) north of Fujairah, United Arab Emirates.

=== 14 September ===
List of shipwrecks: 14 September 1998
Ship	State	Description
Bonita	Saint Vincent and the Grenadines	The cargo ship suffered an engine failure off Dakar, Senegal. Deckared a constructive total loss, she arrived at Gijón, Spain on 11 January 1999 for scrapping.
Unidentified barge	United States	The retired 140-foot (42.7 m) barge was scuttled as an artificial reef in the North Atlantic Ocean 3.6 nautical miles (6.7 km; 4.1 mi) off Sea Girt, New Jersey, in 65 feet (20 m) of water at 40°06.400′N 073°57.080′W. Her wreck is nicknamed the "Banana Barge," the "DVD Barge," and the "King Barge."

=== 18 September ===
List of shipwrecks: 18 September 1998
Ship	State	Description
Hunter II	New Zealand	The 10 m (33 ft) trawler capsized and sank off Tirua Point, south of Marokopa, New Zealand, when its bow was hit by a large wave. Of the four crew, the only survivor swam 1.7 km (1.1 mi) to reach the shore. The trawler left port with an anchor missing.
Princess of the Orient	Philippines	Typhoon Vicki: The ferry capsized and sank in a typhoon off Fortune Island, Batangas with the loss of 64 of the 505 people on board. Eighty-six people were reported missing .

=== 20 September ===
List of shipwrecks: 20 September 1998
Ship	State	Description
Lucisaura	United States	The retired 78-foot (23.8 m) fishing trawler was scuttled as an artificial reef in the North Atlantic Ocean south of Long Island off Hempstead, New York.

=== 21 September ===
List of shipwrecks: 21 September 1998
Ship	State	Description
Medina	Antigua and Barbuda	The cargo ship caught fire. She was towed to El Ferrol, Spain, where she ran aground. She was refloated on 23 September. Declared a constructive total loss, she arrived at Vigo, Spain on26 October for scrapping.

=== 22 September ===
List of shipwrecks: 22 September 1998
Ship	State	Description
Pathfinder	Ghana	The fishing vessel was lost.
Shelagh K.	United States	The fishing vessel capsized and sank in the Atlantic Ocean 19 nautical miles (35 km) east of Provincetown, Massachusetts (42°23′N 70°04′W). Her four crew were rescued.
Tina D.	Belize	Hurricane Georges: The tanker struck the pier at Port au Prince, Haiti and was severely damaged. She was a total loss.

=== 23 September ===
List of shipwrecks: 23 September 1998
Ship	State	Description
Adolphus Busch I	Honduras	hurricane Georges: The cargo ship struck the pier at Port au Prince, Haiti and was scuttled. She was a constructive total loss.

=== 24 September ===
List of shipwrecks: 24 September 1998
Ship	State	Description
USS Belknap	United States Navy	The decommissioned Belknap-class guided-missile cruiser was sunk as a target in the Atlantic Ocean at 36°31′00.3″N 071°58′00.5″W.
Ocean Alley	United Kingdom	The cargo ship was wrecked at Port-au-Prince, Haiti. Renamed Adolphus Busch, she was sunk on 5 December as an artificial reef off Looe Key, Florida, United States.
Only One Express	Honduras	The cargo ship was wrecked while in port at Port-au-Prince, Haiti. Repairs were attempted, but abandoned the next month.

=== 25 September ===
List of shipwrecks: 25 September 1998
Ship	State	Description
Sputnik	United States	The 32-foot (9.8 m) longline halibut-fishing vessel was destroyed by an engine room fire near Shuyak Island in the Kodiak Archipelago. Her entire crew of three survived.

=== Unknown date ===
List of shipwrecks: Unknown date in September 1998
Ship	State	Description
Grigoroussa	Liberia	The bulk carrier sprang a leak 30 nautical miles (56 km) east of Trinidad on or about 28 September. Her crew were rescued by a tug. She was towed in to Port of Spain, Trinidad on 3 October. Declared a constructive total loss, she arrived at Tuxpan, Mexico on 4 December for scrapping.

== October ==
=== 2 October ===
List of shipwrecks: 2 October 1998
Ship	State	Description
Spika	Russia	The fishing vessel foundered in the Sea of Okhotsk off Shiashkotan (43°13′N 145°47′E). Her eight crew were rescued.

=== 5 October ===
List of shipwrecks: 5 October 1998
Ship	State	Description
Dong Won No.259	South Korea	The fishing vessel ran aground on Breaksea Island, New Zealand (47°07′S 168°13′E). She sank on 8 October. Her 39 crew were rescued.

=== 8 October ===
List of shipwrecks: 8 October 1998
Ship	State	Description
Anglo Bahamas	Bahamas	The cargo ship collided with Tidan (Sweden) at Antwerp, Belgium and sank. She was refloated in early November. Declared a constructive total loss, she arrived at Ghent, East Flanders, Belgium on 9 December for scrapping.

=== 15 October ===
List of shipwrecks: 15 October 1998
Ship	State	Description
Chun Il	South Korea	The cargo ship ran aground off Sukumo, Japan (32°53′06″N 132°27′24″E) and was abandoned by her crew. She broke in two on 17 October and sank on 19 October.

=== 16 October ===
List of shipwrecks: 16 October 1998
Ship	State	Description
Aster	Ukraine	The cargo ship capsized and sank in the North Sea (56°05′N 7°59′E) with the loss of three of her eleven crew. Three people were reported missing.
Burgundy Clipper	Belize	The cargo ship foundered in the Atlantic Ocean (41°35′N 9°19′W). Her crew were rescued.
H. H. A.	Singapore	Typhoon Zeb: The tanker sank off Tamsui, Taiwan(25°07′N 121°13′E) with the loss of two of her fourteen crew. Five people were reported missing.
Mandy Ray	United States	The retired 126-foot (38.4 m) fishing trawler was scuttled as an artificial reef in the North Atlantic Ocean south of Long Island off Shinnecock Inlet, New York, at 40°48.133′N 072°28.500′W.

=== 17 October ===
List of shipwrecks: 17 October 1998
Ship	State	Description
Paradise Queen II	Belize	The fishing vessel ran aground on the Kure Atoll, Midway Islands.

=== 19 October ===
List of shipwrecks: 19 October 1998
Ship	State	Description
Cantik	Indonesia	The cargo ship foundered in the South China Sea (19°18′N 114°19′E). Twenty-five of her 27 crew were rescued. The other two were reported missing.
Francis W	United States	While no one was on board, the 42-foot (12.8 m) salmon troller was destroyed at Ketchikan, Alaska, by a fire that started in her galley stove.

=== 21 October ===
List of shipwrecks: 21 October 1998
Ship	State	Description
Eendracht	Netherlands	The schooner ran aground at Newhaven, East Sussex, United Kingdom. All 51 people on board were rescued by helicopter. She was later refloated and returned to service.
Siete Villas	Spain	The fishing vessel was wrecked.

=== 26 October ===
List of shipwrecks: 26 October 1998
Ship	State	Description
Cheryl Ann	United States	With no one aboard, the 58-foot (17.7 m) salmon seiner was wrecked at Saxman, Alaska, after she broke loose from her moorings in bad weather.

=== 27 October ===
List of shipwrecks: 27 October 1998
Ship	State	Description
Fantome	Equatorial Guinea	Hurricane Mitch: The schooner sank in the Gulf of Mexico off Honduras with the loss of all 31 people on board after sending a final radio report on this date.

=== 29 October ===
List of shipwrecks: 29 October 1998
Ship	State	Description
Ocean Hope I	United States	The 92-foot (28.0 m) cod trawler capsized and sank in the Shelikof Strait off Cape Karluk (57°35′10″N 154°30′50″W) on Kodiak Island. Her crew of four survived.

== November ==
=== 2 November ===
List of shipwrecks: 2 November 1998
Ship	State	Description
Ochakov	Russia	The fishing vessel ran aground off Shimushir, Kuril Islands (47°09′N 152°14′E). Her crew were rescued.
Pescalanza	United Kingdom	The fishing vessel capsized and sank in the Atlantic Ocean 50°18′N 10°56′W) with the loss of four of her twelve crew. Two people were reported missing.

=== 6 November ===
List of shipwrecks: 6 November 1998
Ship	State	Description
Atlantic Prize	Canada	The fishing vessel foundered in the Atlantic Ocean (44°00′42″N 52°28′36″W). Her six crew were rescued.
Captain Sam	United States	The retired 78-foot (23.8 m) fishing trawler was scuttled as an artificial reef in the North Atlantic Ocean south of Long Island 2.5 nautical miles (4.6 km; 2.9 mi) off Moriches Inlet, New York.
Niagara Falls	United States	The retired 90-foot (27.4 m) fishing trawler was scuttled as an artificial reef in the North Atlantic Ocean south of Long Island 2.5 nautical miles (4.6 km; 2.9 mi) off Moriches Inlet, New York.

=== 7 November ===
List of shipwrecks: 7 November 1998
Ship	State	Description
Fairline	United Kingdom	The fishing vessel foundered in the North Sea 100 nautical miles (190 km) east of the Shetland Islands. Her crew were rescued.

=== 11 November ===
List of shipwrecks: 11 November 1998
Ship	State	Description
Glaros	Greece	The fishing vessel was lost.
Ministro Portales	Chilean Navy	The decommissioned Allen M. Sumner-class destroyer was sunk as a target off Cape Horn.

=== 13 November ===
List of shipwrecks: 13 November 1998
Ship	State	Description
Camisard	France	The fishing vessel foundered in the Strait of Dover (51°13′N 1°42′E). Her seven crew were rescued.
Rahmat Buhari	Indonesia	The passenger ship foundered south east of Sulawesi. Forty people were reported missing.

=== 14 November ===
List of shipwrecks: 14 November 1998
Ship	State	Description
Zubara	Belize	The refrigerated cargo ship caught fire off Shuwaikh, Kuwait. Her crew were rescued. She sank on 17 November.

=== 18 November ===
List of shipwrecks: 18 November 1998
Ship	State	Description
Ashraf R.	Cambodia	The cargo ship sank in the Sea of Marmara off Ambarli, Turkey. Her fifteen crew were rescued.
Jing Shui Quan	China	The container ship foundered off Xiamen (24°09′N 118°32′E).
Miyahata	Panama	The cargo ship foundered off the coast of Taiwan (24°56′N 120°06′E). Seven of her seventeen crew were rescued, the rest were reported missing.

=== 19 November ===
List of shipwrecks: 19 November 1998
Ship	State	Description
Steeler	Honduras	The cargo ship ran agroud at Qingdao, China. Her seven crew were rescued. She was declared a total loss.

=== 20 November ===
List of shipwrecks: 20 November 1998
Ship	State	Description
Star Sun	Saint Vincent and the Grenadines	The cargo ship ran aground in Wasum Bay, Papua New Guinea. She was refloated with the assistane of tugs.

=== 22 November ===
List of shipwrecks: 22 November 1998
Ship	State	Description
Sonnodd	Norway	The cargo ship ran aground and sank at Haakallen (58°17′N 8°35′E) with the loss of one of her four crew.

=== 24 November ===
List of shipwrecks: 24 November 1998
Ship	State	Description
Bjarnarey	Ireland	The fishing vessel foundered in the Atlantic Ocean. Her fifteen crew were rescued.
Kalimantan Express	Indonesia	Tropical Storm Elvis: The cargo ship foundered in the Bay of Bengal off the Sandheads, India. Her 22 crew were rescued.

=== 27 November ===
List of shipwrecks: 27 November 1998
Ship	State	Description
Iolani	United States	The fishing vessel collided with the container ship Settsu (Japan) and sank in the Pacific Ocean 350 nautical miles (650 km) west of Oahu, Hawaii. Her six crew were rescued.

=== Unknown date ===
List of shipwrecks: Unknown date in November 1998
Ship	State	Description
Ohtori	Argentina	The fishing vessel caught fire south east of Cape Horn, Chile on 6 November. Some of her crew were rescued by Yamoto (Flag unknown), others remained aboard to fight the fire. She was taken in tow, but the tow parted on 16 November. Presumed to have subsequently foundered.
Sir Raphael	Belize	The offshore supply vessel ran aground in the Gee River. She was subsequently vandalized and was a total loss.

== December ==
=== 3 December ===
List of shipwrecks: 3 December 1998
Ship	State	Description
Sputnik	Russia	The fishing vessel was sunk by ice off Sakhalin (46°32′N 141°14′E). Her eighteen crew were rescued.

=== 5 December ===
List of shipwrecks: 5 December 1998
Ship	State	Description
Adolphus Busch	United Kingdom	The cargo ship was sunk in the Atlantic Ocean off Big Pine Key, Florida, to create an artificial reef.

=== 7 December ===
List of shipwrecks: 7 December 1998
Ship	State	Description
Pixy Marzo	Panama	The cargo ship was reported in distress in the South China Sea (23°17′N 117°57′E). She was on a voyage from Hong Kong to Keelung, Taiwan. No further trace.
Saleh F.	Belize	The refrigerated cargo ship caught fire in the Indian Ocean (20°36′N 59°24′E). Her nineteen crew were rescued. She sank on 13 December.

=== 9 December ===
List of shipwrecks: 9 December 1998
Ship	State	Description
Star Sun	Saint Vincent and the Grenadines	The cargo ship sank in the Bismarck Sea (5°42′S 151°46′E). Her 38 crew were rescued. She was under tow from Wasum Bay to Rabaul, Papua New Guinea.

=== 10 December ===
List of shipwrecks: 10 December 1998
Ship	State	Description
Sejati	Indonesia	The ro-ro ship was reported in a sinking condition 20 nautical miles (37 km) west of Manado. Her crew were rescued. She capsized and sank on 17 December (1°17′N 124°26′E).

=== 11 December ===
List of shipwrecks: 11 December 1998
Ship	State	Description
Linda E	United States	The 39.8-foot (12.1 m) 29-gross register ton steel-hulled fish tug disappeared on Lake Michigan near Port Washington, Wisconsin, with the loss of her entire crew of three men. On 18 June 2000, the mine countermeasures ship USS Defender (United States Navy) discovered her wreck in 260 feet (79 m) of water 7 miles (11 km) off the coast of Wisconsin, and a subsequent investigation concluded that she sank within a few seconds of colliding with an integrated tug and barge on the day she disappeared. Her wreck was included in the Wisconsin Shipwreck Coast National Marine Sanctuary in 2021.

=== 13 December ===
List of shipwrecks: 13 December 1998
Ship	State	Description
Frihav	Cyprus	The cargo ship ran aground at Punta Galera, Spain. She subsequently broke in two, the stern section sank.

=== 15 December ===
List of shipwrecks: 15 December 1998
Ship	State	Description
Maria Madra	Saint Vincent and the Grenadines	The cargo ship foundered in the Mediterranean Sea (36°57′N 13°15′E).
Monarch of the Seas	Norway	The cruise ship struck a reef off St. Maartan. Water started coming in, resulting in grounding the ship.

=== 16 December ===
List of shipwrecks: 16 December 1998
Ship	State	Description
Bikdon	Belize	The cargo ship ran aground 2.9 nautical miles (5.4 km) off the Shira-su Lighthouse, Japan. She was refloated but sank later that day (33°58′24″N 130°46′12″E). Her sixteen crew were rescued.
Dogruyollar II	Turkey	The cargo ship foundered in the Mediterranean Sea off Haifa, Israel. Her crew were rescued.
Niko	Panama	The cargo ship foundered 460 nautical miles (850 km) off Salvador. Her crew were rescued.
Sea Dog	United Kingdom	The fishing vessel sank in the Atlantic Ocean (53°41′N 13°49′W). Her eighteen crew were rescued.

=== 17 December ===
List of shipwrecks: 17 December 1998
Ship	State	Description
I-SILC-class semi-submersible infiltration vessel	Korean People's Navy	Battle of Yeosu: The infiltration vessel became entangled in a fishing net off Yeosu, South Korea, while attempting to land North Koream commandos in South Korea, was intercepted by Republic of Korea Navy vessels, and sank with the loss of all nine of her passengers and crew while being pursued by South Korean ships and aircraft.

=== 19 December ===
List of shipwrecks: 19 December 1998
Ship	State	Description
Marelie	Saint Vincent and the Grenadines	The cargo ship foundered in the Mediterranean Sea off the coast of Cyprus.

=== 21 December ===
List of shipwrecks: 22 December 1998
Ship	State	Description
Black Sheep	United States	The fishing vessel collided with Columbus Canada (Liberia) and sank in the Houston Ship Channel.

=== 22 December ===
List of shipwrecks: 22 December 1998
Ship	State	Description
Andrea Marie	United States	The 39-foot (11.9 m) vessel was abandoned near Kodiak, Alaska, after she caught fire.

=== 24 December ===
List of shipwrecks: 24 December 1998
Ship	State	Description
Hong Chang	Panama	The cargo ship ran aground off the coast of Taiwan (22°35′N 120°59′E). Her crew were rescued.

=== 26 December ===
List of shipwrecks: 26 December 1998
Ship	State	Description
Emily Brooke	United States	With no one on board, the 36-foot (11.0 m) sea cucumber and sea urchin dive boat was destroyed at Bar Harbor (55.3444356°N 131.6546628°W) at Ketchikan, Alaska, by a fire that began in her galley stove.

=== 27 December ===
List of shipwrecks: 27 December 1998
Ship	State	Description
VC Offshore Stand Aside	Australia	1998 Sydney to Hobart Yacht Race: The badly damaged sailing yacht was abandoned without loss of life in the Tasman Sea in the vicinity of the Bass Strait during a storm. She was not seen again and presumably sank.
Winston Churchill	Australia	1998 Sydney to Hobart Yacht Race: The sailing yacht sank in a storm in the Tasman Sea in the vicinity of the Bass Strait. Her crew of nine abandoned ship in a life raft, but three died before rescue.

=== 28 December ===
List of shipwrecks: 28 December 1998
Ship	State	Description
Midnight Special	Flag unknown	1998 Sydney to Hobart Yacht Race: The badly damaged sailing yacht was abandoned without loss of life in the Tasman Sea in the vicinity of the Bass Strait during a storm, with helicopters rescuing her crew of nine. She was not seen again and presumably sank.
Miintinta	Flag unknown	1998 Sydney to Hobart Yacht Race: The badly damaged sailing yacht's crew abandoned ship in a life raft in the Tasman Sea in the vicinity of Bass Strait during a storm and were rescued without loss of life by the fishing trawler Josephine Jean. Josephine Jean took Miintinta under tow, but Miintinta sank shortly afterwards in the Tasman Sea off New South Wales, Australia, at 36°57′S 150°42′E.
Sword of Orion	Australia	1998 Sydney to Hobart Yacht Race: After one crew member was swept overboard and presumed drowned in a storm on 27 December, a Royal Australian Navy helicopter rescued the remaining six crew members from the badly damaged sailing yacht in the Tasman Sea in the vicinity of the Bass Strait. Sword of Orion was not seen again and presumably sank.
Violetta	Cyprus	The bulk carrier caught fire off Galveston, Texas, United States. She was declared a constructive total loss.

=== Unknown date ===
List of shipwrecks: Unknown date December 1998
Ship	State	Description
Arco Arun	United Kingdom	The coaster capsized in the Thames Estuary at Northfleet Hope. She was later raised and refloated.

== Unknown date ==
List of shipwrecks: Unknown date 1998
Ship	State	Description
Brown Bear	United States	The motor vessel, a former research ship, was scuttled in the Pacific Ocean off San Diego, California, in late 1997 or in January 1998.
"Fleetwood Lady"	Ireland	The 85-foot (26 m) fishing vessel capsized and sank as a result of vandalism while moored at Howth, Ireland sometime in 1998. Raised 10 weeks later and converted into a houseboat.
Mr. J	United States	The crab processor – a former PCE-842-class patrol craft and auxiliary minelayer – was towed out into the Pacific Ocean and scuttled sometime in the 1990s.
HMS Sirius	Royal Navy	The decommissioned Leander-class frigate was sunk as a target in the Atlantic Ocean by the submarine HMS Spartan (Royal Navy).
