= Ukai Thermal Power Station =

Building in India

- Country: India
- Location: Ukai, Tapi, Gujarat
- Coordinates: 21°12′36.5″N 73°33′26.23″E
- Status: Operational
- Commission date: Unit 1: March 1976; Unit 2: June 1976; Unit 3: January 1979; Unit 4: September 1979
- Operator: GSECL

Thermal power station
- Primary fuel: Coal

Power generation
- Units operational: 2 X 120 MW; 2 X 200 MW; 1 X 210 MW; 1 X 500 MW
- Nameplate capacity: 1,35 0 MW

External links
- Website: gsecl.in

Ukai Thermal Power Station of the Gujarat State Electricity Corporation Limited, India, is a power station with an installed capacity of 1,110 MW. It is one of Gujarat's major coal-fired power plants, located on the bank of the Tapi river.

== Power plant ==
Ukai Thermal Power Station is located on the banks of the Tapi because of the water resources, along with the hydroelectric power plant with the same name. Ukai TPS Unit-1 is the first power station unit in India with a capacity more than 100 MW.

== Installed capacity ==
Stage	Unit number	Installed capacity (MW)	Date of commissioning	Status
Stage I	1	120	March 1976	Retired from service
Stage I	2	120	June, 1976	Retired from service
Stage I	3	200	January 1979	Running
Stage I	4	200	September, 1979	Running
Stage I	5	210	January 1985	Running
Stage I	6	500	2013	Running

Unit 7 plan start 2028

Unit 8 plant start 2030

Ukai TPS unit-6 was first unit in GSECL having a capacity more than 500 MW.

== Transport ==
It is on the Jalgaon-Surat branch line of Western Railway. Coal-based thermal power stations consume large quantities of coal. For example, the Ukai Thermal Power Station consumed 3,200,000 tonnes of coal in 2006–07. Around 80 per cent of the domestic coal supplies in India are meant for coal based thermal power plants and coal transportation forms 42 per cent of the total freight earnings of Indian railways.

== See also ==
- Gandhinagar Thermal Power Station
- Wanakbori Thermal Power Station
- Sikka Thermal Power Station
- Dhuvaran Thermal Power Station
- Kutch Thermal Power Station
- Gujarat State Electricity Corporation Limited
