= Gandhinagar Thermal Power Station =

Power plant in India

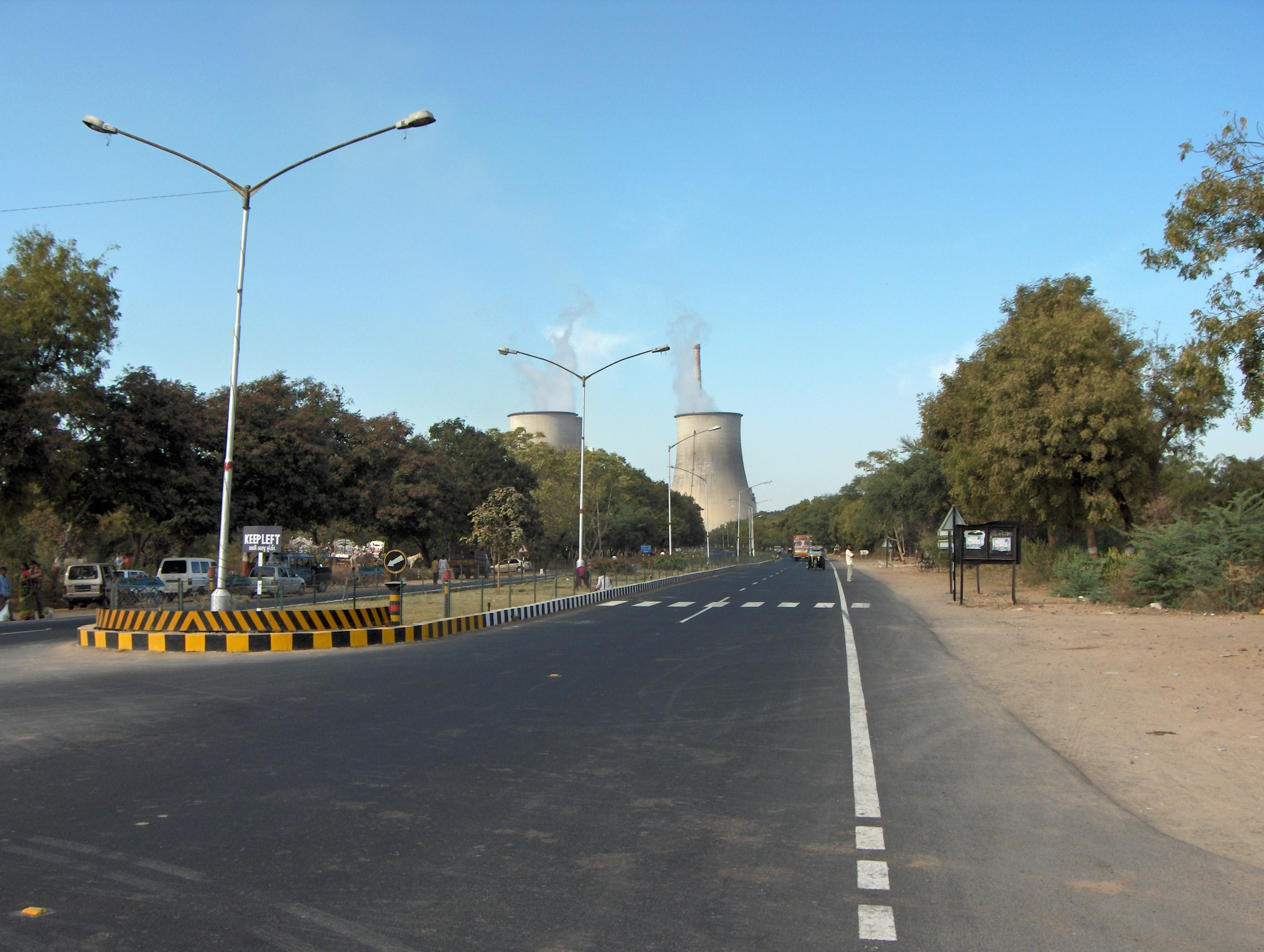
- Country: India
- Location: Gandhinagar, Gandhinagar, Gujarat
- Coordinates: 23°14′57″N 72°40′15″E
- Status: Operational
- Commission date: 1977
- Operator: GSECL

Thermal power station
- Primary fuel: Coal

Power generation
- Units operational: 3 X 210 MW
- Nameplate capacity: 870 MW

External links
- Commons: Related media on Commons

Gandhinagar Thermal Power Station is a coal-fired power station in Gujarat, India. It is located on the bank of Sabarmati river near Gandhinagar.

Stage	Unit Number	Installed Capacity (MW)	Date of Commissioning	Status
Stage I	1	120	March 1977	Stopped
Stage I	2	120	April, 1977	Stopped
Stage II	3	210	March 1990	Running
Stage II	4	210	July, 1991	Running
Stage II	5	210	March 1998	Running

== See also ==
- Ukai Thermal Power Station
- Wanakbori Thermal Power Station
- Sikka Thermal Power Station
- Dhuvaran Thermal Power Station
- Kutch Thermal Power Station
