= Wanakbori Thermal Power Station =

Building in India gujarat dist kheda

- Country: India
- Location: Wanakbori, Kheda, Gujarat
- Coordinates: 22°52′34″N 73°21′38″E
- Status: Operational
- Commission date: 1982
- Owner: GSECL
- Operator: GSECL

Thermal power station
- Primary fuel: Coal

Power generation
- Units operational: 7 X 210 MW and 1x800 MW
- Nameplate capacity: 2,270 MW

External links
- Website: gsecl.in

Wanakbori Thermal Power Station is a coal-fired power station in Gujarat, India. It is located on the bank of Mahi River in Wanakbori in Mahisagar district. There are eight units at this location, seven of each 210 MW and one of 800 MW capacity.

Stage	Unit Number	Installed Capacity (MW)	Date of Commissioning	Status
Stage I	1	210	March 1982	Running
Stage I	2	210	January, 1983	Running
Stage I	3	210	March, 1984	Running
Stage 2	4	210	March, 1986	Running
Stage 2	5	210	September 1986	Running
Stage 2	6	210	November 1987	Running
Stage 3	7	210	December 1998	Running
Stage 4	8	800	October 2019	Running

GSECL had recently entrusted BHEL with an order for setting up an 800 MW supercritical coal-based project at Wanakbori in Gujarat on EPC basis. BHEL has completed the construction activities and the 800 MW was declared as commercially operational on 12 October 2019 at 14:00.

== See also ==
- Gandhinagar Thermal Power Station
- Ukai Thermal Power Station
- Sikka Thermal Power Station
- Dhuvaran Thermal Power Station
- Kutch Thermal Power Station
