= S. K. Varma Nagar =

S.K.VarmaNagar VarmaNagar
- city
- Nickname: Varmanagar
- Location in Gujarat, India S.K.VarmaNagar (India)
- Coordinates: 23.685°N 68.718°E
- Country: India
- State: Gujarat
- District: Kachchh
- Named for: Shyamji Krishna Varma

Languages
  - Official: Kutchi, Gujarati, Hindi
- Time zone: UTC+5:30 (IST)
- Postal code: 370627
- Area code: 2839
- Vehicle registration: GJ-12
- Website: gujaratindia.com

Shyamji Krishna Varma Nagar also known as S. K. VarmaNagar and commonly known as VarmaNagar is a City of India, developed in the 1970s, which is located in the Lakhpat Taluka of Kutch District of Gujarat. It is named after famous freedom fighter from Kutch, Shyamji Krishna Varma.

The town is located at a distance of 14 kilometers from Taluka headquarters of Lakhpat and 110 km from district headquarters of Bhuj. Originally the town was developed as a township of Gujarat Mineral Development Corporation Limited (GMDC). In 1979 government announced a power project to also develop the township of GEB (now Gujarat State Electricity Corporation Limited) in the same location. Currently this is the only township of both the GMDC and GSECL.

The town has a School, which is also named as Shree Shyamji Krishna Varma Vidyalay. There are hospitals run by Gujarat Electricity Board (GEB) and Gujarat Mineral Development Corporation(GMDC Ltd.) and also a small industrial area.

A lignite-based power plant is near the town, which generates and provides electricity to many areas of Kutch. Varma Nagar is located near the Panandhro Lignite Mines and main population of the town are dependent upon these mines and associated business connected to it.

The town hosts the Pandhro Geological Museum which holds in display fossils of Paleozoic era found in these mines.

== Education ==
=== Primary, Secondary and Higher Education school ===
- Shyamji Krishna Varma vidhyalaya, the first high school of S.k.varmanagr, established in 16/06/1961. Its established by Shree S.K.Diwan (Project Manager of GMDC Ltd.), Shree S.N.Mathur (Mines Manager of GMDC Ltd.), Shree R.C.Shah (Administrative Officer) and Shree K.N.Limbadiya. firstly it was known as a "Shree Lignite Education Trust".
