= D. J. Pandian =

Former Chief Secretary of Gujarat and current Director general at New Development Bank

Dr. D. Jagatheesa Pandian, IAS (Retd.)
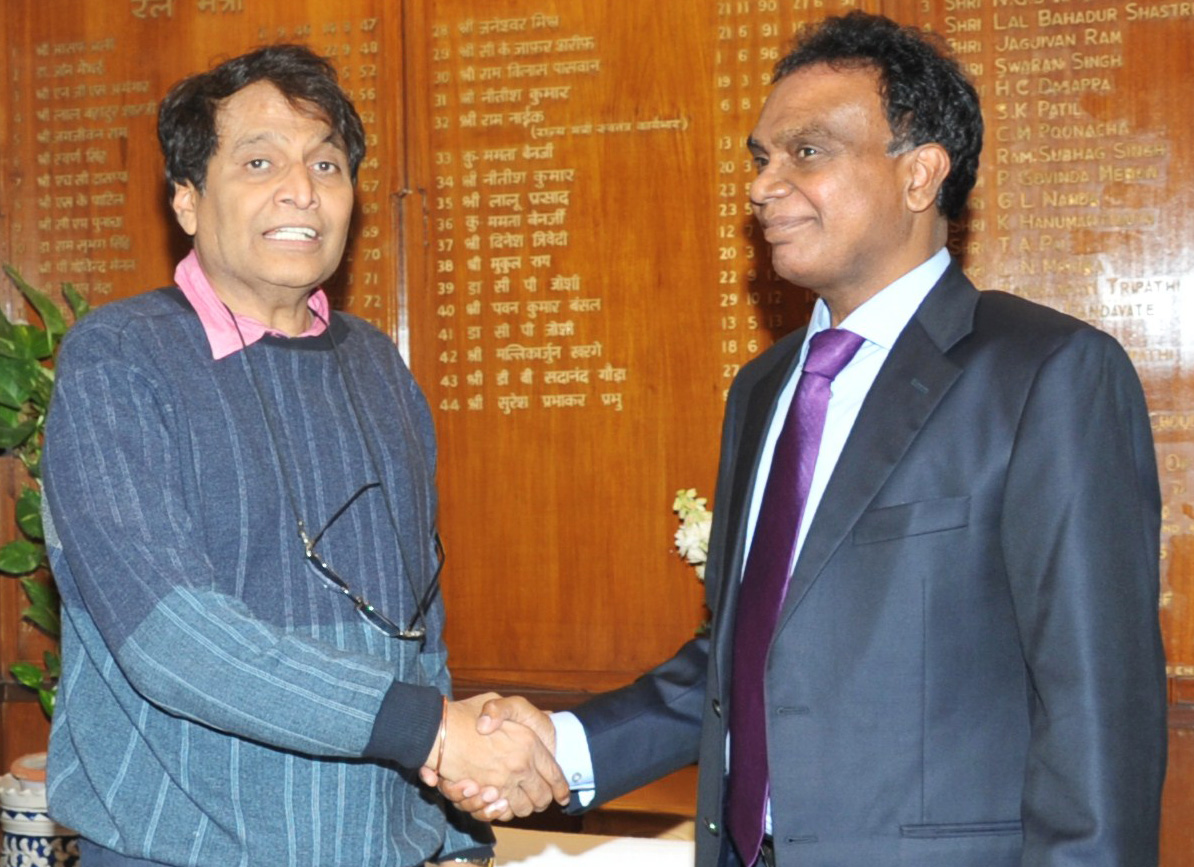

1st Vice President and Chief Investment Officer of Asian Infrastructure Investment Bank (AIIB)
- Incumbent
- Assumed office 5 February 2016
- Preceded by: Office established

26th Chief Secretary of Gujarat
- In office 1 November 2014 – 31 May 2015
- Preceded by: Dr. Varesh Sinha
- Succeeded by: Ganga Ram Aloria

Personal details
- Born: 11 May 1955 (age 71) Tamil Nadu, India
- Spouse: Asha Jagatheesa Pandian
- Education: (BBA) (MBA) (PhD) University of Madras
- Occupation: Retired IAS officer

D. Jagatheesa Pandian (born 11 May 1955) is a retired Indian Administrative Service officer of 1981 batch from Gujarat cadre who is currently serving as the Director General of New Development Bank in its Asia region and previously served as the Chief Secretary of Gujarat and as Vice president of AIIB Bank.

== Education ==
Pandian has a graduate (BBA) and a postgraduate degree (MBA) in Business Administration from the University of Madras. He also has a doctorate (PhD) in energy security.

== Career ==
=== As an IAS officer ===
Pandian served in various key positions for both the Union Government and the Government of Gujarat during his career, like as the Chief Secretary of Gujarat, Additional Chief Secretary (Industries and Mines), Principal Secretary (Energy and Petrochemicals), Managing Director of Gujarat State Petroleum Corporation (GSPC), Vice Chairman and Managing Director of Gujarat Mineral Development Corporation (GMDC), Managing Director of Directorate of Information and Technology, and as the District Magistrate and Collector of Kheda and Bharuch districts in the Gujarat Government, and as a Director/Deputy Secretary in the Department of Economic Affairs of Ministry of Finance in the Union Government.

Pandian also had a stint in the World Bank.

==== Chief Secretary of Gujarat ====
Pandian was appointed as the Chief Secretary of Gujarat by the Chief Minister of Gujarat in October 2014, Pandian assumed the office of Chief Secretary on 1 November 2014, and demitted it and simultaneously superannuated from service on 31 May 2015.

=== Post-retirement ===
Post his retirement from IAS, Pandian was appointed as the vice president and chief investment officer of the Asian Infrastructure Investment Bank in February 2016.
