= Shyamji Krishna Varma =

Indian revolutionary, lawyer and journalist

Pandit Shyamji Krishna Varma Bhanushali
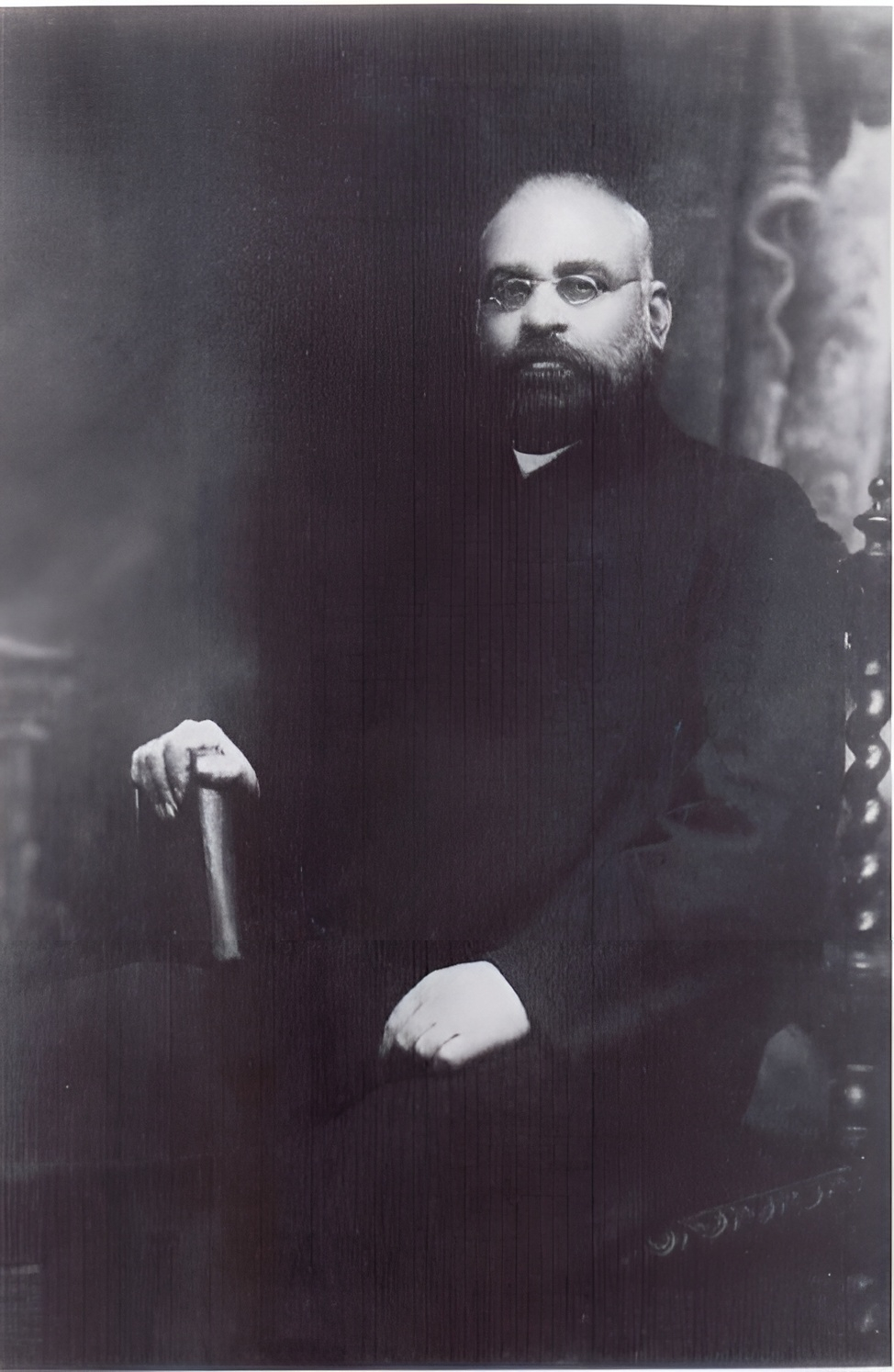
- Born: 4 October 1857; Mandvi, Kutch State, British India (now in Gujarat, India)
- Died: 30 March 1930 (aged 72); Geneva, Switzerland
- Monuments: Kranti Teerth, Mandvi, Kutch
- Education: Balliol College, Oxford
- Occupations: Revolutionary, lawyer, journalist
- Organizations: Indian Home Rule Society; India House; The Indian Sociologist
- Movement: Indian Independence Movement
- Spouse: Bhanumati (m. 1875)
- Parent(s): Bhula Hansraj Bhansali (father), Ramadevi (mother)

Shyamji Krishna Varma (ISO 15919: Śyāmajī Kr̥ṣṇa-varmā) (1 October 1857 – 30 March 1930) was an Indian revolutionary, lawyer and journalist who founded the Indian Home Rule Society, India House and The Indian Sociologist in London. A graduate of Balliol College, Krishna Varma was a noted scholar in Sanskrit and other Indian languages. He pursued a brief legal career in India and served as the Divan of a number of Indian princely states in India. He had, however, differences with Crown authority, was dismissed following a supposed conspiracy of British colonial officials at Junagadh and chose to return to England. An admirer of Dayanand Saraswati's approach of cultural nationalism, and of Herbert Spencer, Krishna Varma believed in Spencer's dictum: "Resistance to aggression is not simply justified, but imperative".

In 1905, he founded the India House and The Indian Sociologist, which rapidly developed as an organised meeting point for radical nationalists among Indian students in Britain at the time and one of the most prominent centres for revolutionary Indian nationalism outside India. Krishna Varma moved to Paris in 1907, avoiding prosecution.

== Early life ==
Shyamji Krishna Varma was born in 1857 in Mandvi, then part of Cutch State in a poor Bhanushali family. Later in life Shyamji appended his name with "Varma", most likely to pass himself off as belonging to the Kshatriya varna. Shyamji was a precocious student; he attended the English-medium high school in Bhuj until the age of 13, when his father, Bhula Hansraj, called him to Bombay where Bhula was working as a labourer in a cotton factory. Thanks to the patronage of Kutchi Bhatia merchant Mathuradas Lavaji, Shyamji studied both in the English-style Wilson's High School and the traditional Sanskrit pāṭhśālā of Shastri Vishwanath. Through the connections within the Kutchi Bhatia and Bhansali networks in Bombay, he found another financial patron in the Bhansali cotton merchant Chabildas Lallubhai, who subsequently became his father-in-law in 1875.

In the 19th century, Hindu reforms movements emerged in western India that advocated moral reform based on religious authority. Amongst the Kutchi Bhatias and Bhansalis in Bombay (including Chabildas Lallubhai), the reformist rally against the Vaishnava Vallabha sampradaya (aka the Pushtimarg) was most prominent. At the invitation of anti-Pushtimarg Bhatia merchants, Dayanand Saraswati (the founder of the Arya Samaj) came to Bombay, who preached an attractive anti-Vaishnava ideology that focused on anti-caste meritocracy. Shyamji came to consider Dayanand Saraswati as his "personal guru" and in 1876 began working full-time as a scholar and lecturer for the Arya Samaj, becoming acclaimed as a "Pandit"; at the same time, he also made inroads with the European colonial network in Bombay.

After coming into contact with Monier Monier Williams, Professor of Sanskrit at Oxford University, Shyamji became obsessed with attending Oxford, a dream that was opposed by his Bhatia and Bhansali patrons who did not desire him to break the caste taboo against travelling overseas. Eventually securing funds from his wife Bhanumati and the Goan physician and intellectual José Gerson da Cunha, Shyamji left Bombay for Oxford in 1879.

== Oxford ==
During his time at Oxford (1879-1885), Shyamji assisted Monier Williams in his oriental studies on Hinduism and gave performances utilising his traditional learning, while at the same time imbimbing western knowledge and studying law. Shyamji became a skilled philologist, winning attention from European academia and the "imperial establishment of Victorian Britain". Shyamji's self-confidence and sense of superiority grew; his command of Sanskrit and Hindu culture earned him high regard from his academic colleagues, pupils, and Theosophists. Shyamji graduated as the first Indian with a Masters of Arts degree from Oxford.

== Legal career in India ==
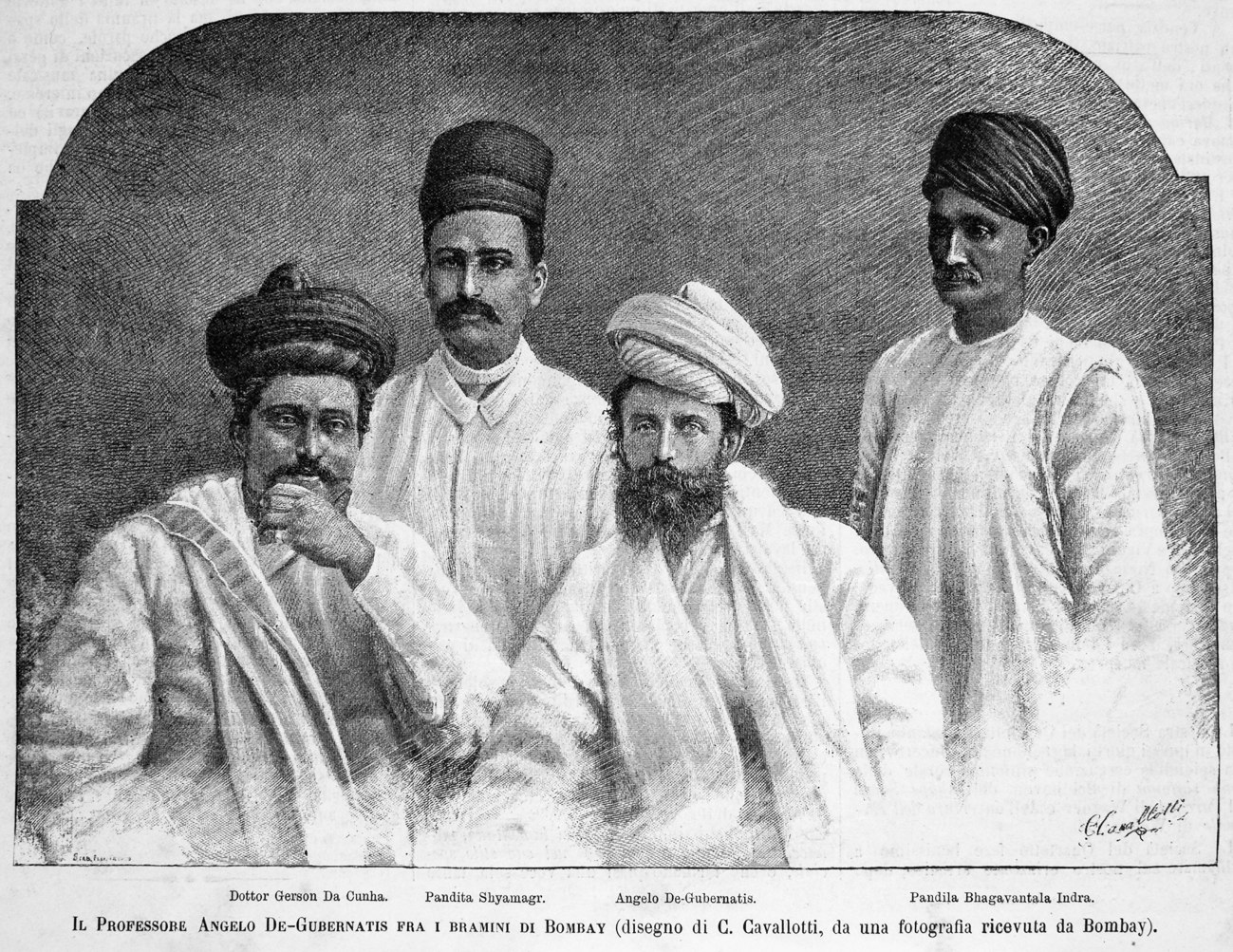
Shyamji at the Brahman investiture ceremony of Angelo de Gubernatis by Bhagwanlal Indraji (1885). Also present is José Gerson da Cunha.

He returned to India in 1885 and started practicing law as an advocate in the Bombay High Court. Then he accepted the position of Diwan (prime minister) of Ratlam State, part of the Central India Agency, a position for which he was strongley suited for given his education and skills. Health forced him to retire from this post with a lump sum gratuity of Rs. 32,000 for his service. He then worked as a barrister in Ajmer; during this time Shyamji also became a petty industrialist by purchasing cotton mills in Rajputana. In Ajmer he staged a protest opposing the Age of Consent Act, 1891.

From 1893-1895, Shyamji served as a member of the state council of Udaipur State. In 1894, Shyamji and a fellow intellectual were in a suite in the Traveller's Bungalow in Ajmer, when an English soldier barged in and rudely demanded matches. The soldier threatened the duo with his bamboo cane, but Shyamji snatched it and struck down the soldier with a blow from his arm.

Later Shyamji served as the Diwan of Junagadh State. While there he helped his former Oxford pupil, A. F. Maconochie, get a position there. Maconochie proceeded to promote "unwarranted allegations" about Shyamji which eventually led to dismissal from his post.

A third incident of personal humiliation occurred in 1897. Due to an outbreak of bubonic plague, Shyamji's train was stopped at the station in Ratlam for medical examination of passengers. A military officer demeaningly and authoritatively ordered the first-class Indians passengers to descend upon the platform to be examined, while the second-class English passengers were accommodatingly treated within their own cabins. The first-class Indian passengers protested against this biased treatment, to which the officer became enraged and arrested Shyamji under "section 353 of the Indian Penal Code for ‘assaulting a public servant in the execution of his duty’". While the charges were later dropped, the combined incidents of humiliation shook Shyamji's trust in the imperial system which he had previously been so acclaimed by. During this period Shyamji also became a critic of the British government's paranoia against "terrorists" and their heavy-handed approach to the perceived threat.

In 1897, Shyamji and his wife left India for London, where they could enjoy a far more liberal atmosphere for anti-colonialists than anywhere within British India itself.

== England ==
When Shyamji arrived in London, the city already had a small community of Indians and a presence of Indian political moderates; however, he was the first Indian political extremist to reside in the city. When Shyamji first arrived, he stayed at the Inner Temple and later bought a house in Highgate. He made contacts with Indian political exiles and studied Herbert Spencer's writings but generally kept a low profile. Shyamji made his first appearance as a public figure at the funeral of Herbert Spencer in 1903, where he committed £1,000 to establish a lectureship at the University of Oxford in Herbert Spencer's name. Through trade on international stock exchanges, Shyamji became a multi-millionaire, through which he funded his revolutionary strategies for Indian independence.

A year later he announced that Herbert Spencer Indian fellowships of Rs.2,000 each were to be awarded to enable Indian graduates to finish their education in England. He announced additional fellowship in memory of the late Dayananda Saraswati, the founder of Arya Samaj, along with another four fellowships in the future.

== Political activism ==
In 1905, Shyamji focused his activity as a political propagandist and organiser for the complete independence of India. Shyamji made his debut in Indian politics by publishing the first issue of his English monthly, The Indian Sociologist, an organ and of political, social and religious reform. This was an assertive, ideological monthly aimed at inspiring mass opposition to British rule, which stimulated many intellectuals to fight for the independence of India.

=== Indian Home Rule Society ===
On 18 February 1905, Shyamji inaugurated a new organisation called The Indian Home Rule Society. The first meeting, held at his Highgate home, unanimously decided to found The Indian Home Rule Society with the object of:

1. Securing Home Rule for India
2. Carrying on propaganda in England by all practical means with a view to attain the same.
3. Spreading among the people of India the objectives of freedom and national unity.

=== India House ===
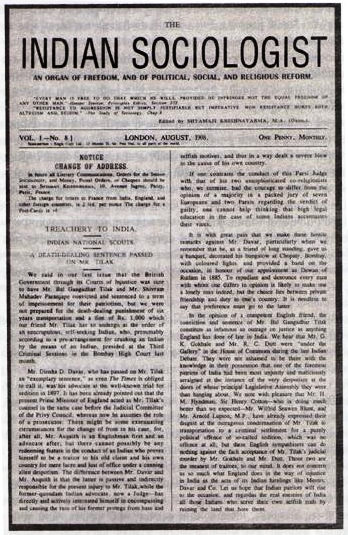
The Indian Sociologist, September 1908, London

As many Indian students faced racist attitudes when seeking accommodations, he founded India House as a hostel for Indian students, based at 65, Cromwell Avenue, Highgate. This living accommodation for 25 students was formally inaugurated on 1 July by Henry Hyndman, of the Social Democratic Federation, in the presence of Dadabhai Naoroji, Lala Lajpat Rai, Madam Cama, Mr. Swinney (of the London Positivist Society), Mr. Harry Quelch (the editor of the Social Democratic Federation's Justice) and Charlotte Despard, the Irish Republican and suffragette. Declaring India House open, Hyndman remarked, "As things stands, loyalty to Great Britain means treachery to India. The institution of this India House means a great step in that direction of Indian growth and Indian emancipation, and some of those who are here this afternoon may live to witness the fruits of its triumphant success." Shyamji hoped India House would incubate Indian revolutionaries and Bhikaiji Cama, S. R. Rana, Vinayak Damodar Savarkar, Virendranath Chattopadhyaya, Hemchandra Kanungo, and Lala Hardayal were all associated with it.

Later in 1905, Shyamji attended the United Congress of Democrats held at Holborn Town Hall as a delegate of the India Home Rule Society. His resolution on India received an enthusiastic ovation from the entire conference. Shyamji's activities in England aroused the concern of the British government: He was disbarred from Inner Temple and removed from the membership list on 30 April 1909 for writing anti-British articles in The Indian Sociologist. Most of the British press were anti–Shyamji and printed several allegations against him and his newspaper. He defended them boldly. The Times referred to him as the "Notorious Krishnavarma". Many newspapers criticised the British progressives who supported Shyamji and his view. His movements were closely watched by the British secret service, so he decided to shift his headquarters to Paris, leaving India House in charge of Vinayak Damodar Savarkar. Shyamji left Britain secretly before the government tried to arrest him.

=== Cooperation and connections ===
Shyamji maintained connection and collaborated with a variety of varied anti-imperial movements.

In 1906, Shyamji made contacts with members of the National Party (Egypt) and maintained an interest in promoting Egyptian nationalist movements against the British. Shyamji also had contacts with other anti-imperial Islamic movements and members of the Indian House went to Morocco hoping to learn guerilla warfare from Riffians. Shyamji also heavily cooperated with Irish Republican movements in New York City, United States. The Indian Sociologist and The Gaelic American reprinted the other’s articles and expressed mutual support for agitation against British imperialism. With Irish American support, an India House was established in New York City. With Japan’s victory in the Russo-Japanese War, Japan became a symbol of Asian modernity to India. In 1907, Indian students in Tokyo were inspired by Shyamji and instituted their own India House, whose presence paved the way for future Indian political leaders’ exiles in Tokyo. Shyamji promoted Pan-Asianism, promoting a common goal of Asian countries to throw off the yolk of European imperial rule. He particularly focused on Japan and China, losing some faith in the former due to its own imperial ambitions.

Shyamji was in close contact with Henry Hyndman, an English socialist and anti-imperialist. Hyndman was a fierce opponent of British imperialism in Asia and expressed pan-Asianist views. Shyamji also found allies among anarchists; when The Indian Sociologist was declared seditious in 1909, British anarchist Guy Alfred offered his Bakunin Press to Shyamji to continue its publication. Walter Strickland, 9th Baronet, another anarchist, was inspired by Alfred’s actions and wrote articles which were published in The Indian Sociologist. Shyamji also collaborated with positivists like Frederic Harrison who were opposed to British colonialism.

Despite his political connections, Shyamji was a staunch Spencerian conservative and Indian nationalist. His personal lifestyle remained “quasi-brahmanical”; he ate home-cooked vegetarian food, maintained a traditional relationship with his wife, and wore austere black coats.

=== Paris and Geneva ===
He arrived in Paris in early 1907 to continue his work. The British government tried to have him extradited from France without success as he gained the support of many top French politicians. Shyamji's name was dragged into the sensational trial of Mr Merlin, an Englishman, at Bow Street Magistrates' Court, for writing an article in liberators published by Shyamji's friend, Mr. James.

Shyamji's work in Paris helped gain support for Indian Independence from European countries. He agitated for the release of Savarkar and acquired great support all over Europe and Russia. Guy Aldred wrote an article in the Daily Herald under the heading of "Savarkar the Hindu Patriot whose sentences expire on 24 December 1960", helping create support in England, too. In 1914 his presence became an embarrassment as French politicians had invited King George V to Paris to set a final seal on the Entente Cordiale. Shyamji foresaw this and shifted his headquarters to Geneva. Here the Swiss government imposed political restrictions during the entire period of World War I. He kept in touch with his contacts, but he could not support them directly. He spent time with Dr. Briess, president of the Pro India Committee in Geneva, whom he later discovered was a paid secret agent of the British government.

== Post–World War I ==
He offered a sum of 10,000 francs to the League of Nations to endow a lectureship to be called the President Woodrow Wilson Lectureship for the discourse on the best means of acquiring and safe guarding national independence consistently with freedom, justice, and the right of asylum accorded to political refugees. It is said that the league rejected his offer due to political pressure from British government. A similar offer was made to the Swiss government which was also turned down. He offered another lectureship at the banquet given by Press Association of Geneva where 250 journalists and celebrities, including the presidents of Swiss Federation and the League of Nations. Shyamji's offer was applauded on the spot but nothing came of it. Shyamji was disappointed with the response and he published all his abortive correspondence on this matter in the next issue of the Sociologist appearing in December 1920, after a lapse of almost six years.

== Death and commemoration ==
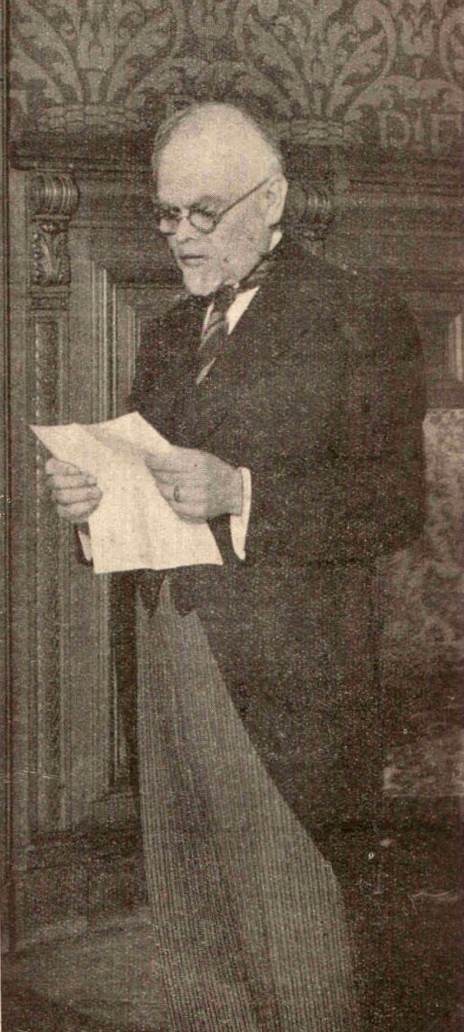
Image from Modern Review, April 1938

He published two more issues of Indian Sociologist in August and September 1922, before ill health prevented him continuing. He died in hospital at 11:30 p.m. on 30 March 1930 leaving his wife, Bhanumati Krishnavarma.

News of his death was suppressed by the British colonial government in India. Nevertheless, tributes were paid to him by Bhagat Singh and other inmates in Lahore Jail where they were undergoing a long-term drawn-out trial. Maratha, an English daily newspaper started by Bal Gangadhar Tilak paid tribute to him.

He had made prepaid arrangements with the local government of Geneva and St Georges cemetery to preserve his and his wife's ashes at the cemetery for 100 years and to send their urns to India whenever it became independent during that period. Requested by Paris-based scholar Dr Prithwindra Mukherjee, the then Prime Minister Indira Gandhi agreed to repatriate the ashes. Finally on 22 August 2003, the urns of ashes of Shyamji and his wife Bhanumati were handed over to then Chief Minister of Gujarat State Narendra Modi by the Ville de Genève and the Swiss government 55 years after Indian Independence. They were brought to Mumbai and after a long procession throughout Gujarat, they reached Mandvi, his birthplace. A memorial called Kranti Teerth dedicated to him was built and inaugurated in 2010 near Mandvi. Spread over 52 acres, the memorial complex houses a replica of India House building at Highgate along with statues of Shyamji Krishna Varma and his wife. Urns containing Krishna Verma's ashes, those of his wife, and a gallery dedicated to earlier activists of Indian independence movement is housed within the memorial. Krishna Verma was disbarred from the Inner Temple in 1909. This decision was revisited in 2015, and a unanimous decision taken to posthumously reinstate him.

In the 1970s, a new town developed in his native state of Kutch, was named after him as Shyamji Krishna Varmanagar in his memory and honor. India Post released postal stamps and first day cover commemorating him. Kuchchh University was renamed after him.

The India Post has issued a postal stamp on Shyamji Krishna Varma on 4 October 1989.

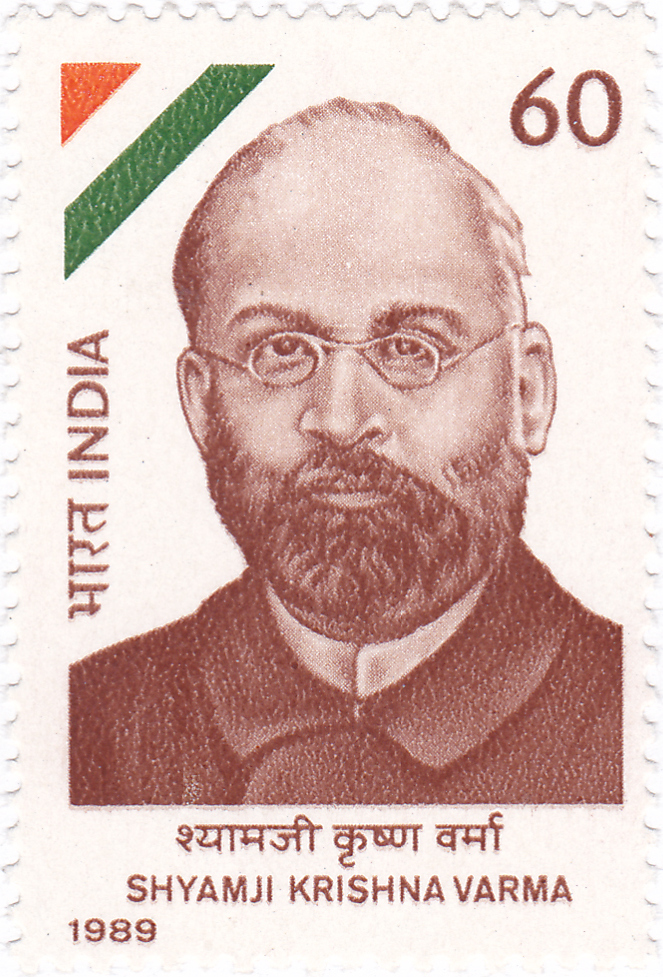
Shyamji Krishna Varma 1989 stamp of India

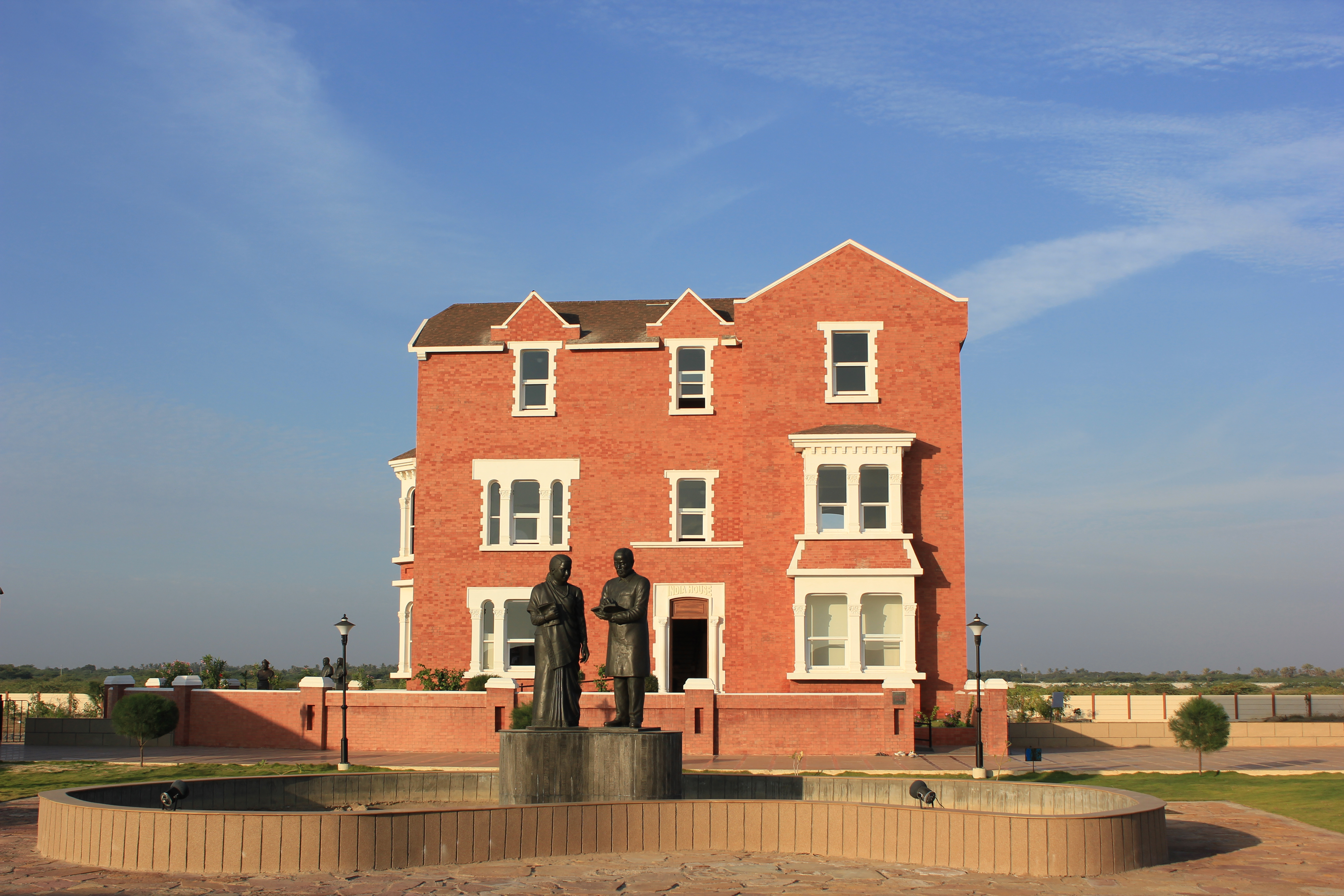
Kranti Teerth, Shyamji Krishna Varma Memorial, Mandvi, Kutch (replica of India House is visible in background)
