= Dhuvaran Gas Based CCPP =

Power plant in Anand District, Gujarat

Coordinates: 22.23980248°N 72.75249791°E

Dhuvaran Gas Based CCPP is a power plant, in Anand district in the Indian state of Gujarat. The power plant functions as one of the gas based power plants of Gujarat State Electricity Corporation Limited.

== Capacity ==
Stage	Unit Number	Installed Capacity (MW)	Date of Commissioning	GT / ST
1	1	67.85	2004 January	GT
1	2	38.767	2007 November	ST
2	3	72.51	2006 March	GT
2	4	39.94	2007 August	ST
Total	4	219		
