= Utran Gas Based Power Station =

Utran Gas Based Power Station is located on the bank of the Tapi River near the city of Surat, in Surat district in the Indian state of Gujarat. It is one of the gas-based power plants operated by Gujarat State Electricity Corporation Limited.

== Capacity ==
Stage	Unit Number	Installed Capacity (MW)	Date of Commissioning	GT / ST
1	1	30	1992 December	GT
1	2	30	1992 December	GT
1	3	30	1993 May	GT
1	4	45	1993 July	ST
2	5	228	2009 July	GT
2	6	147	2009 November	ST
Total	6	510		
