= Panadhro =

- village
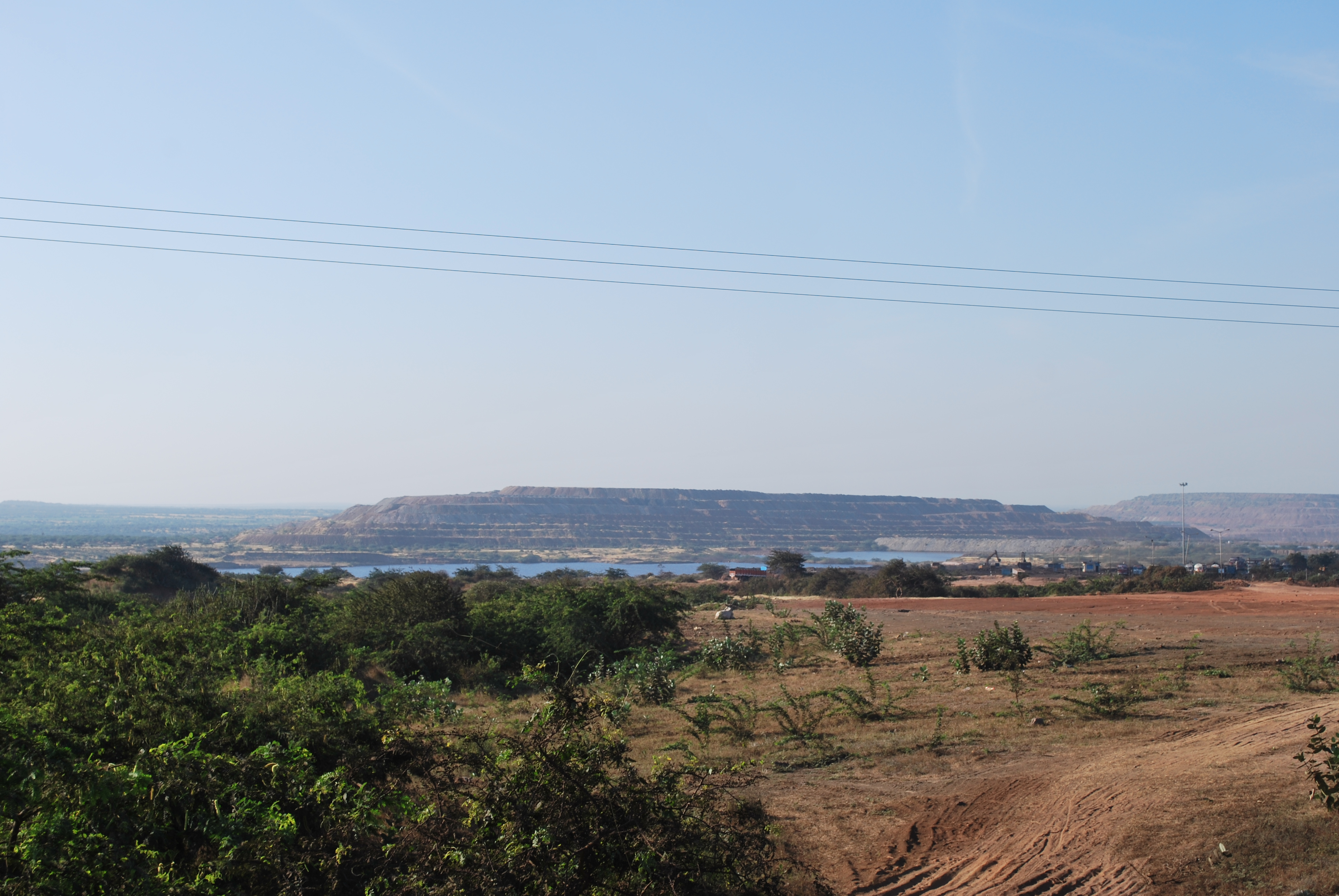
- Panadhro Coal Mines

- Location in Gujarat, India Panadhro (India)
- Coordinates: 23.684°N 68.751°E
- Country: India
- State: Gujarat
- District: Kachchh

Languages
  - Official: Gujarati, Hindi
- Time zone: UTC+5:30 (IST)
- Vehicle registration: GJ
- Nearest Town: Varmanagar
- Website: gujaratindia.com

Panadhro is a village located in Lakhpat Taluka of Kutch District of Gujarat State in India.

Panadhro is famous for its Lignite mines, which were developed in early 1970s and are run by Gujarat Mineral Development Corporation Limited.

Recently, Panadhro was in the news when a 9 Metre Crocodilian skeleton fossil was dug out of the Panadhro Lignite mine, which was about 90 million years old.

The town of S. K. Varmanagar developed after Panadhro mines were discovered is just a few kilometers away and fulfills the daily needs of mining community.
