= CSL Tadoussac =

Canadian lake freighter

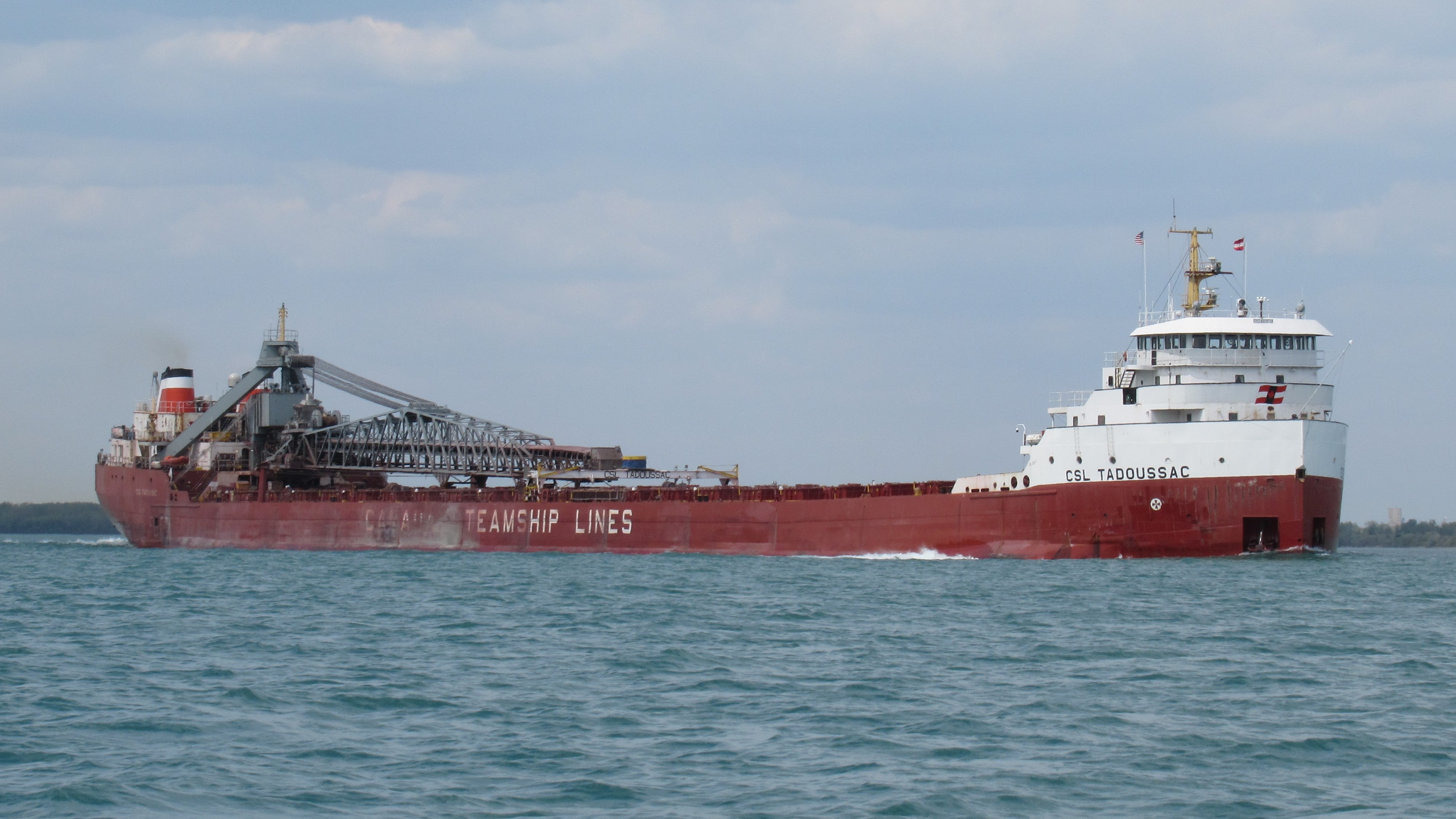
- CSL Tadoussac travelling south along the Detroit River

History
- Name: CSL Tadoussac
- Owner: Canada Steamship Lines
- Operator: Canada Steamship Lines
- Builder: Collingwood Shipbuilding, Collingwood, Ontario
- Yard number: 192
- Laid down: 25 June 1968
- Launched: 29 May 1969
- Completed: October 1969
- Identification: IMO number: 6918716
- Status: In service

General characteristics
- Type: Bulk carrier/Lake freighter
- Tonnage: 20,634 GRT (as built); 20,101 GT (after 2001 conversion); 29,262 DWT
- Length: 222.6 m (730 ft 4 in) oa.; 218.9 m (718 ft 2 in) pp.
- Beam: 22.9 m (75 ft 2 in)
- Propulsion: 1 shaft, diesel engine
- Speed: 14.5 knots (26.9 km/h; 16.7 mph)

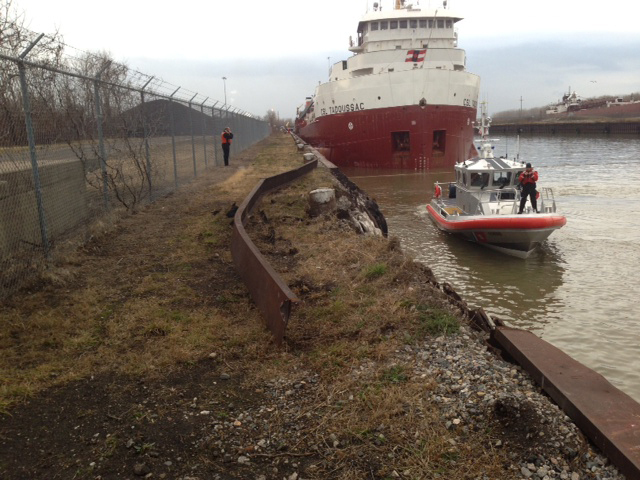
CSL Tadoussac shortly after colliding with a mooring on the Maumee River in Toledo, Ohio

CSL Tadoussac is a lake freighter currently operated by Canada Steamship Lines (CSL) on the Great Lakes. She was launched in 1969. Initially named Tadoussac, following her refit in 2001, she was renamed CSL Tadoussac She was the last freighter built for CSL in the traditional two superstructure design, which puts her bridge up in the ship's bow. The vessel primarily transports iron ore and coal.

== Description ==
CSL Tadoussac has a gross tonnage of 20,101 and a deadweight tonnage of 30,132 tonnes. The ship is 222.6 metres (730 ft 4 in) long overall and 218.9 metres (718 ft 2 in) between perpendiculars with a beam of 22.9 metres (75 ft 2 in). CSL Tadoussac is propelled by one shaft powered by a diesel engine. This gives the ship a maximum speed of 14.5 knots (26.9 km/h; 16.7 mph). She was the last freighter built for CSL in the traditional two superstructure design, which puts her bridge up in the ship's bow. She was designed and built with a self-unloading boom and self-unloading hoppers. Her boom pivots from her aft superstructure. The vessel transports primarily iron ore and coal.

== Construction and service history ==
The vessel was built at Collingwood Shipyards in Collingwood, Ontario. The vessel's keel was laid on 25 June 1968 and Tadoussac was launched on 29 May 1969. Her launch was marred by an accident that released the vessel 15 minutes early. Two workers died and 35 were injured. The ship was completed in October 1969. On 26 April 1984, Tadoussac ran aground in the St. Clair River in heavy ice. The vessel was freed on 28 April with the assistance of two tugboats. On 2 April 1990, the ship struck an abutment of a bridge in Port Colborne, Ontario. Tadoussac received an 11-foot (3 m) crack in her hull while the bridge supports were also damaged. On 10 November 1990, the eve of the fifteenth anniversary of the sinking of SS Edmund Fitzgerald, Tadoussac lost power in a serious storm off Whitefish Point, in Lake Superior. Edmund Fitzgerald was lost off Whitefish Point.

On 20 April 1997, the vessel lost power near the Eisenhower Lock in the Saint Lawrence Seaway. The ship required the assistance of tugboats to get to Port Weller, Ontario to undergo repairs, arriving on 25 April. On 9 July 1998, Tadoussac ran aground in the St. Clair River while carrying a load of coal. It took five tugboats to free the ship. Later that month, on 28 July, Tadoussac ran aground on a sandbank off of Detroit in Lake Erie. On 2 September 1999, the ship collided with a bridge in the Welland Canal. No significant damage was sustained. On 20 November 2000, the vessel went aground again at Sarnia, Ontario while preparing to unload her cargo of grain. Tadoussac was freed on 21 November.

Tadoussac was sent to Port Weller Shipyards in December 2000, for a $20 million CAD conversion. CSL initiated the conversion to comply with contractual obligations to clients in the cement clinker and iron ore trades. She was widened; her self-unloading machinery was completely replaced and had dust suppression equipment installed. The changes resulted in a modest increase in her maximum capacity for most cargoes, but reduced her capacity for carrying coal. On 1 March 2015, after her conversion, she was rechristened CSL Tadoussac, instead of merely Tadoussac.

On 11 December 2012, CSL Tadoussac collided with a pier while carrying a load of iron ore on the Maumee River in Toledo, Ohio. Her bunker tank was pierced. No damage was done to the pier. CSL Tadoussac overwinters at Thunder Bay. The ship departed Thunder Bay on 12 April 2014, marking the latest the port had ever opened.

From late 2017 through to early 2018, CSL Tadoussac was refitted at the shipyard in Thunder Bay, marking the first large ship to undergo work at the yard since its reopening in 2017. In November 2020, the vessel leaked diesel fuel while transiting the Soo Locks while en route to Superior, Wisconsin, causing a 30-by-60-foot (9.1 by 18.3 m) sheen on the water. The leak forced the closure of the Soo Locks for two hours on Thanksgiving.

== Sources ==
- Bawal Jr., Raymond A. (2008). Ships of the St. Clair River. St. Clair, Michigan: Inland Expressions. ISBN 978-0-9818157-1-8.
