= MV Adolphus Busch =

Ship sunk off Looe Key, Florida, as an artificial reef and dive site

Coordinates: 24.5307°N 81.4615°W

History

United Kingdom
- Name: Adolphus Busch
- Operator: Dundee, Perth & London Shipping Co Ltd, Dundee
- Builder: Burntisland Shipbuilding Company, Fife
- Yard number: 336
- Launched: 20 December 1950
- Completed: 12 March 1951
- Renamed: 1951–1967: London; 1967–1988: Topsail Star; 1988–1994: Sophie Express; 1994–1995: Princess Tarrah; 1995–1998 Ocean Alley; 1998 Adolphus Busch I
- Identification: IMO number: 5211161
- Fate: Wrecked at Port-au-Prince on 24 September 1998; Scuttled 5 December 1998

General characteristics
- Type: Cargo ship
- Tonnage: 706 tons; 1,186 deadweight tons
- Length: 213 ft (65 m) overall; 197 ft (60 m) pp
- Beam: 36 ft (11 m)

MV Adolphus Busch was a cargo ship that was sunk off Looe Key, Florida, as an artificial reef and dive site.

The ship was built as London by the Burntisland Shipbuilding Company, Fife, Scotland, for the Dundee, Perth & London Shipping Co Ltd, Dundee and was launched on 20 December 1950. She sailed under a number of names during her career before she was wrecked at Port-au-Prince on 24 September 1998 under the name Ocean Alley.

The wreck was bought by August Adolphus Busch IV and named after his great-grandfather, Adolphus Busch. He had the ship stripped out and arranged for its sinking as an artificial reef to help preserve marine habitat. The ship was sunk on 5 December 1998.

== Current status ==
The Adolphus Busch rests upright on a sand bottom at an average depth of 80 feet (24 meters). Maximum depth is 110 feet (34 meters). The wreck is fully penetrable, and can be entered through the bridge or cargo holds. The machinery in the engine room is still present and presents the only major entanglement hazard to divers. The glass from the wheelhouse windows and the covers to the cargo holds have been removed.

Multiple mooring balls are secured to the wreck to allow boats to tie up to the site. Reef fish are common on the site, as are large jewfish, eels, and large pelagic fish. Sharks have been seen on the reef, but are not considered typical.
