= Nanichher =

- Village
- Location within Gujarat Location within India
- Coordinates: 23.783937°N 68.666031°E
- Country: India
- States and territories of India: Gujarat
- List of districts of India: Kutch District
- ISO 3166 code: IN-GJ
- Website: gujaratindia.com

Nanichher is a coastal village in Gujarat, India.
