= Gujarat Mineral Development Corporation =

Indian state-owned company

Gujarat Mineral Development Corporation Limited
- Type: Public; BSE: 532181 NSE: GMDCLTD
- Industry: Mining
- Founded: 1963
- Headquarters: Ahmedabad, Gujarat, India
- Area served: Gujarat
- Key people: Dr. Hasmukh Adhia, Retd.IAS (Chairman); Roopwant Singh, IAS (Managing director); Ms Arti Kanwar, IAS (Secretary (EA), Finance Department)
- Products: Lignite; Bauxite; Flourspar; Manganese; Silica Sand; Limestone; Bentonite; Ball Clay
- Revenue: ▲₹2,734.79 crore (US$280 million)(FY2022)
- Operating income: ▲₹580.57 crore (US$60 million)(FY2022)
- Net income: ▲₹404.98 crore (US$42 million)(FY2022)
- Owner: Government of Gujarat
- Number of employees: 1500+
- Website: www.gmdcltd.com

Gujarat Mineral Development Corporation Limited (GMDC) is a major Indian state-owned minerals and lignite mining company based in Ahmedabad. GMDC was founded in 1963.

Its product range includes essential energy minerals like lignite, base metals and industrial minerals like bauxite and fluorspar. Gujarat government has given its green signal to GMDC to form a joint venture with NALCO for a 1 mtpa refinery.

GMDC also owns and runs Akrimota Thermal Power Station, a 250 MW (2x125 MW) lignite-based thermal power plant located in village Nanichher in Lakhpat Taluka, Kutch District.

== Product range ==
The company has grown in strength since its inception over the years. In 1963 the company commenced its operation with small silica sand quarry. In 1964 it started with bauxite mines in Kutch and now operates six bauxite mines. In 1971, a beneficiation plant was commissioned by GMDC to process 500 M.T of fluorspar ore and to produce calcium fluoride used for the manufacture of Hydro-fluoric acid and as flux in metallurgical industries. A captive mine at Ambadungar was established also to feed the plant. In 1976 lignite was discovered in Gujarat and GMDC started its first lignite mines at Panadhro. In 1980, a captive refining plant with copper mines was set up by GMDC near Ambaji. In 1983, another lignite mine was discovered & started by it at Rajpardi near Bharuch. In 1992, it established a calcination plant to add value to the bauxite mined by it at Gadhsisha in Kutch. In 1996, to use the lignite mined by it, GMDC also started thermal power plant at Nani-Chher in Kutch. In 2005 & 2009 more lignite mines were started by GMDC at Tadkeshwar near Surat and near Bhavnagar, respectively. Also in 2006 it developed manganese ore mines at Shivarajpur in Panchmahals. It is also setting up an Alumina plant with Raytheon Corporation of USA. As part of its Vocational Training Center (VTC) initiatives, GMDC implemented customized Extended Reality (XR) modules to enhance safety awareness and operator readiness for dumper operations.

=== Akrimota Thermal Power Station ===
Akrimota Thermal Power Station (23.769788°N 68.645427°E) is a lignite-based thermal power plant located in village Nanichher in Lakhpat Taluka, Kutch District, Gujarat. The power plant is run by the Corporation. The power plant has an installed capacity of 250 MW (2x125 MW).

Stage	Unit number	Installed capacity (MW)	Date of commissioning	Status
Stage I	1	125	2005 March	Running
Stage I	2	125	2005 December	Running

== Public listing ==
In 1999, the government of Gujarat being the sole owner, divested 26% of its stake and the GMDC became a listed entity (BSE&NSE) and is occupying a position within the top fortune 500 companies in the country with an annual turnover surpassing 10 billion with considerable annual growth rate.

== Upcoming Projects ==
GMDC is keen to set up a Rare Earth Elements Processing Plant, in the country as REEs are essential for developing green energy technologies like permanent magnets for electric vehicles and wind turbines and LEDs.
