= Sikka, India =

Sikka
- Census town
- Location in Gujarat, India Sikka (India)
- Coordinates: 22.424430°N 69.84201595°E
- Country: India
- State: Gujarat
- District: Jamnagar

Population (2011)
  - Total: 20,000

Languages
  - Official: Gujarati, Hindi
- Time zone: UTC+5:30 (IST)
- Vehicle registration: GJ
- Website: gujaratindia.com

Sikka is a census town in Jamnagar district in the Indian state of Gujarat.

== Demographics ==
As of 2011 India census, Sikka had a population of 20,000. Males constitute 52% of the population and females 48%. Sikka has an average literacy rate of 44%, lower than the national average of 59.5%: male literacy is 54%, and female literacy is 34%. In Sikka, 15% of the population is under 6 years of age.

Most residents are of Gujarat and speak Gujarati and Kachhi language. Kachchi language is written in the Gujarati script but is not mutually intelligible with Gujarati. Major communities include Muslim Waghers, Rajputs, Rajgor Brahmins, Lohanas, Mers, Ahirs (Yadav), etc.

Sikka is also a home to the traditional sailing vessel industry (also referred to as Indian dhows) where one can see wooden cargo vessels dry docked, repaired and newly constructed at the Sikka creek also locally called as Hoda Nar or tawai bunder. In the recent past a full-fledged sailing vessel industry flourished here and was the main source of income for this village.

One of the main occupations of the people living in this coastal town is seafaring.

Reliance Industries Limited is operating one of the largest grass root refineries in the world here. This plant covers an area of approximately 25 square kilometers. Another attraction of Sikka from the point of research and education is its Fisheries Research Station, Junagadh Agricultural University, Sikka which was established in 1962. Its deal with the breeding and conservation of marine mollusc an including pearl oyster (Pinctada fucata), edible oyster crassostrea graphoides, opisthobranch fauna, chank and other rare and endangered species.

== Culture ==
A historical coastal town, became a town when it housed a cement factory in the 1940s. Digvijay Cement Company (also known as DCC) was set up, and Sikka became one of the prominent towns of the district. The factory brought along a railway connectivity and modernization of the port. People from nearby villages started moving to Sikka in search of a new world and started settling there, as years passed. Gujarat government also set up a thermal power plant here, due to its railway connectivity and a ready-made port. Reliance Industries houses its crude storage unit in the outskirts of Sikka; these storage units are clearly visible when the town is looked at, in satellite imagery.
