= Gujarat State Electricity Corporation Limited =

Power generation company in Gujarat, India

GSECL
- Type: Subsidiary of Gujarat Urja Vikas Nigam
- Industry: Power
- Predecessor: Gujarat Electricity Board (GEB)
- Founded: Ahmedabad, India (May 1960)
- Headquarters: Vadodara, India
- Number of locations: 10 Power stations (2014) as of 2014-10-14
- Area served: Gujarat India
- Services: Power generation
- Owner: GUVNL (100%)
- Parent: Gujarat Urja Vikas Nigam
- Website: www.gsecl.in

Gujarat State Electricity Corporation Limited (GSECL) is a wholly owned subsidiary of the Gujarat Urja Vikas Nigam (GUVNL), which came into existence in August 1993 after the unbundling of the Gujarat Electricity Board. It is a power generation company working in the territory of Gujarat, India. It delivers electricity through four distribution companies – DGVCL, MGVCL, PGVCL and UGVCL.

== Profile ==
Gujarat State Electricity Corporation Limited was incorporated in August 1993 with the objectives to mobilise resources from the market for adding to the generating capacity of Gujarat and improving the quality and cost of existing generation.

GSECL is involved in a wide spectrum of activities to improve the electricity infrastructure and generation of power in Gujarat and has the status of Independent Power Producer (IPP) with approval to undertake new power projects. The Company commenced its commercial operation in the year 1998.

As a part of the reform process, the Government of Gujarat has unbundled the various functions of GEB and GSECL was given responsibility of electricity generation.

GSECL was notified as State Generating Power Plant by Government of Gujarat on 29 May 2004 with the purpose of improving efficiency in the state’s electricity generation activities.

== Operational Power Stations ==
Name	Type of Fuel	Capacity (MW)
Ukai Thermal Power Station	Coal	1350
Gandhinagar Thermal Power Station	Coal	630
Bhavnagar Lignite Thermal Power Station	Coal	500
Wanakbori Thermal Power Station	Coal	2270
Sikka Thermal Power Station	Coal	540
Kutch Lignite Thermal Power Station	Lignite	290
Dhuvaran Gas Based CCPP	Gas	219
Utran Gas Based Power Station	Gas	510
Ukai Hydro Power Station	Hydro	300
Kadana Hydro Power Station	Hydro	242
Panam Canal Mini Hydro Power Station	Hydro	2

GSECL is also serving Sardar Sarovar Narmada Nigam Limited Hydro-electric project by O&M contract.

== See also ==
- Gujarat Urja Vikas Nigam
- Canal Solar Power Project
