= Sikka Thermal Power Station =

Coal power plant located near Jamnaga, Gujarat

- Country: India
- Location: Sikka, Jamnagar district, Gujarat
- Coordinates: 22.421°N 69.828°E
- Status: Operational
- Commission date: Unit 1: March 1988; Unit 2: March 1993
- Operator: GSECL

Thermal power station
- Primary fuel: Coal

Power generation
- Units operational: 2 X 250, MW
- Nameplate capacity: 500 MW

External links
- Website: gsecl.in

Sikka Thermal Power Station is one of Gujarat's coal-fired power plants. It is located in Sikka, India.

== Power plant ==
Sikka Thermal Power Station is located near Jamnagar, which is the major industrial town in Gujarat. There were two units of 120 MW capacity each, which are now decommissioned. Two 250 MW units are operational.

== Installed capacity ==
| Stage | Unit number | Installed capacity (MW) | Date of commissioning | Status |
|---|---|---|---|---|
| Stage I | 1 | 120 | March 1988 | Stopped |
| Stage I | 2 | 120 | March 1993 | Stopped |
| stage I | 3 | 250 | March 2015 | Commissioned |
| stage I | 4 | 250 | September 2015 | Commissioned |
