= Dhuvaran Thermal Power Station =

Coordinates: 22.2396°N 72.7529°E

Dhuvaran Thermal Power Station is a decommissioned oil and gas power plant located at Khambhat in Anand district, Gujarat. The power plant was under ownership of state owned Gujarat State Electricity Corporation Limited. This was the first power plant of Gujarat Electricity Board, the parent company of Gujarat State Electricity Corporation Limited.

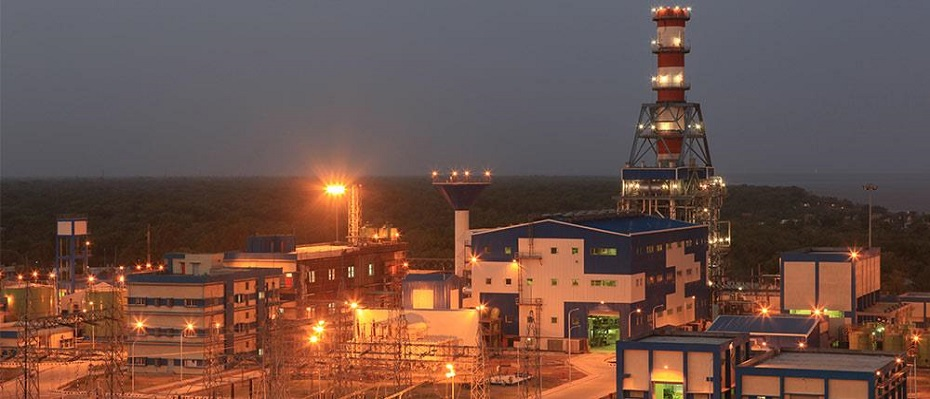
The power plant before it was fully decommissioned in 2010.

== Capacity ==
The power plant stands decommissioned since December 2010.

Unit Number	Installed Capacity (MW)	Date of Commissioning	Status
1	63.5	1965 July	Retired from service
2	63.5	1965 April	Retired from service
3	63.5	1965 February	Retired from service
4	63.5	1964 December	Retired from service
5	140	1972	Derated to 110 MW in April 2007 before retiring in December 2010.
5	140	1972	Derated to 110 MW in April 2007 before retiring in December 2010.
