= Renewable energy in India =

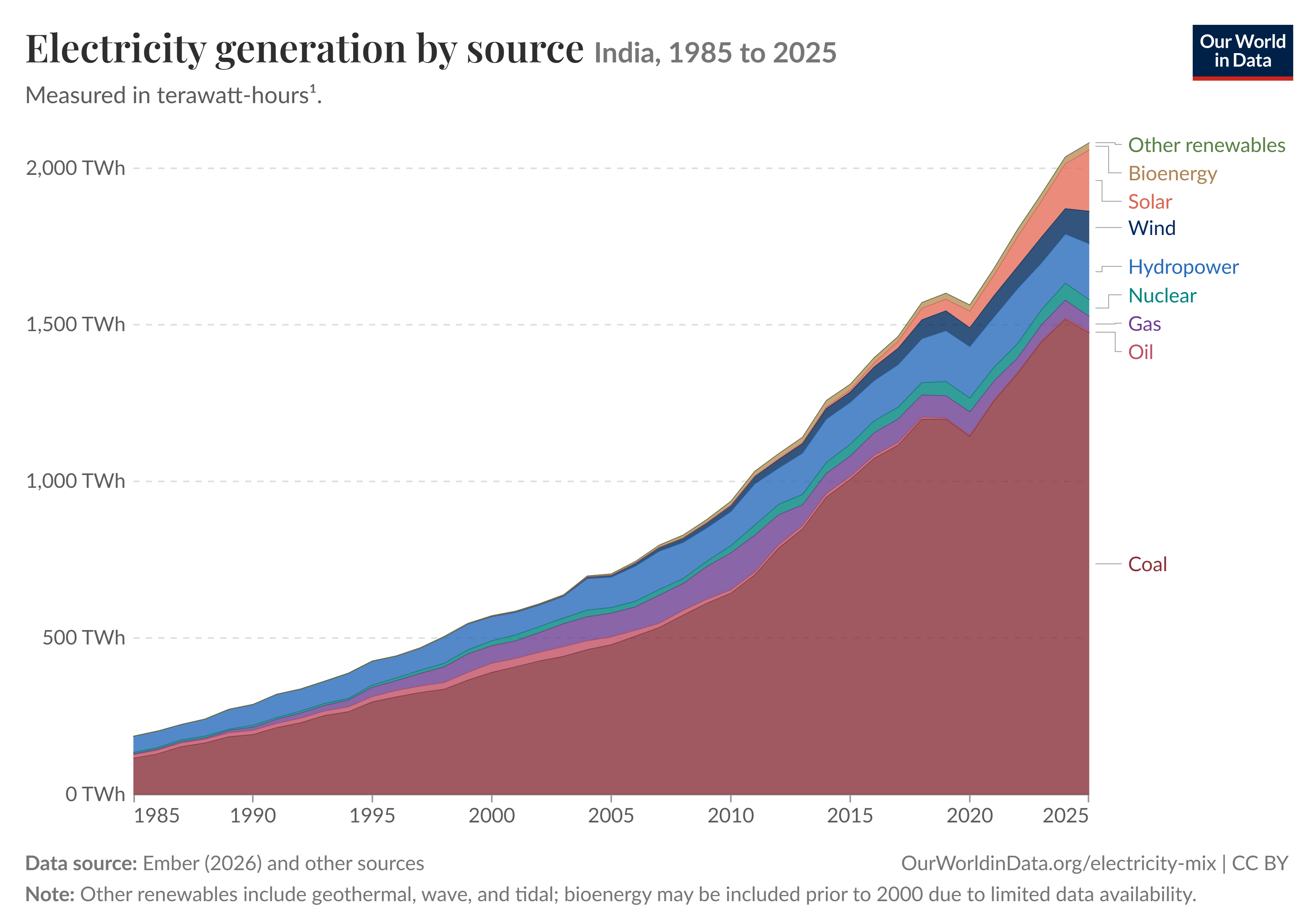
Electricity generation in India by source

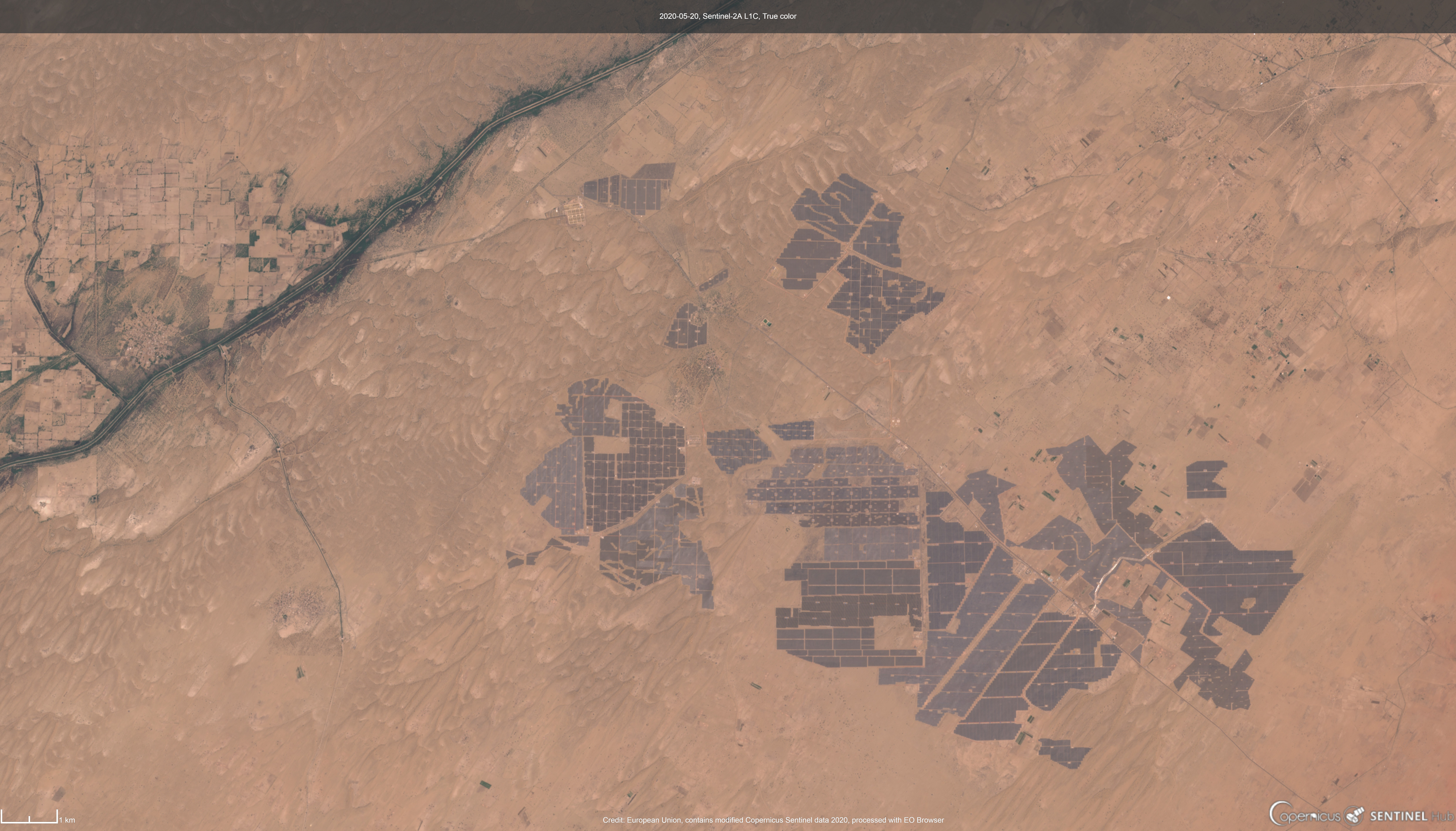
Bhadla Solar Park in India

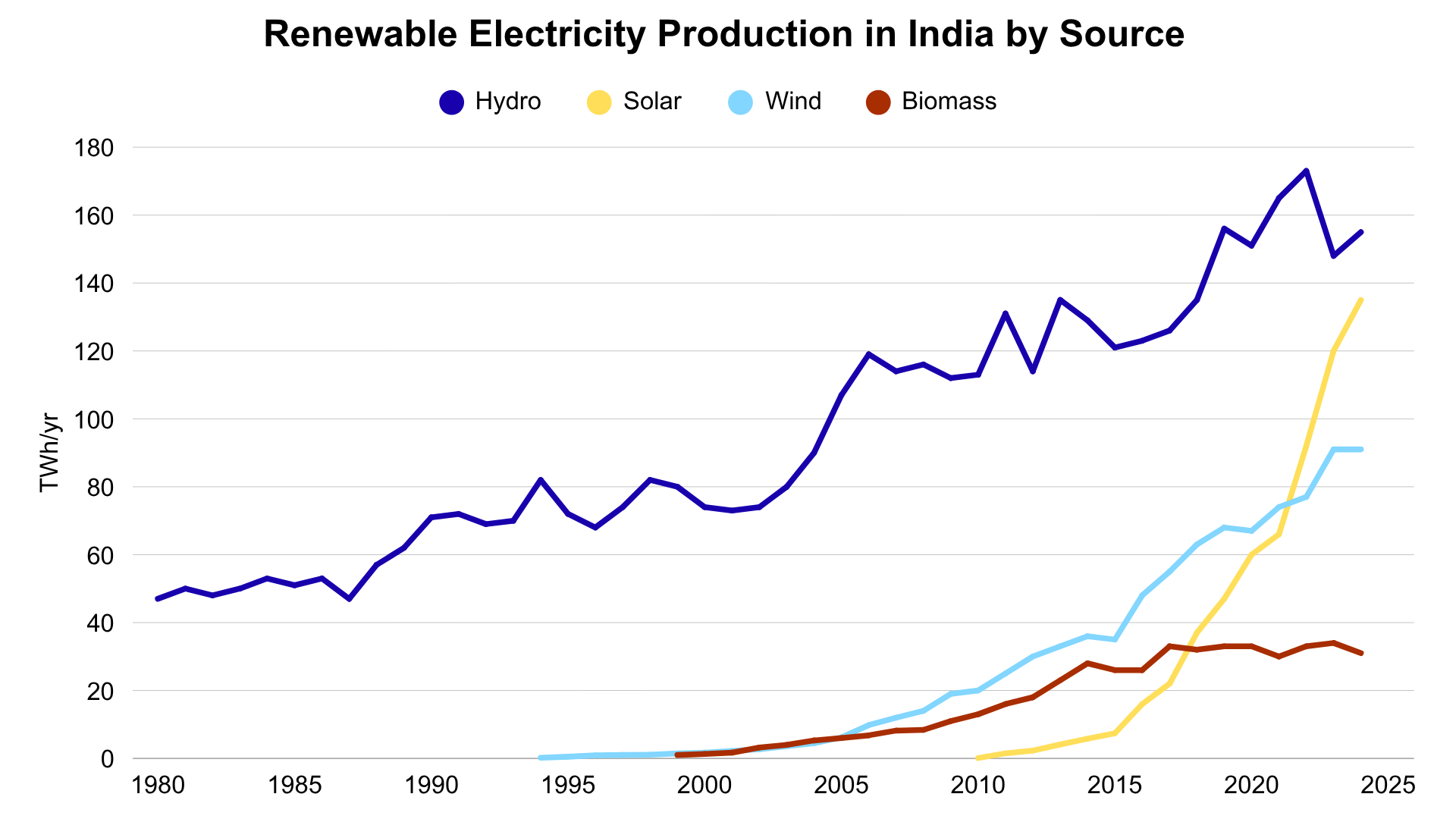
India's renewable electricity production by source.

India is the world's 3rd largest consumer of electricity and has the world's 3rd largest renewable energy installed capacity and 4th highest renewable electricity production. Renewable sources account for more than 50% of India's total installed electricity capacity, a target achieved in 2025, five years ahead of schedule under its Paris Agreement commitments. As of April 2026, it also has the world's 3rd highest solar energy capacity, 4th highest wind energy capacity and 5th highest hydroelectric power capacity. India was the world's first country to set up a ministry of non-conventional energy resources, Ministry of New and Renewable Energy (MNRE), in 1982, which has been responsible for the development and research of renewable energy infrastructure in the country since.

Because of availability and other constraints favoring fossil fuel and nuclear sources, India's power generation remains significantly skewed in favor of fossil fuel and nuclear sources roughly 70% of total power generated in 2025 despite possessing renewable energy infrastructure with more than 50% installed power capacity. Solar, wind and run-of-the-river hydroelectricity are environment-friendly, cheaper power sources. They are used as "must-run" sources in India to cater for the base load, and the polluting and foreign-import dependent coal-fired power is increasingly being moved from the "must-run base load" power generation to the load following power generation (mid-priced and mid-merit on-demand need-based intermittently-produced electricity) to meet the peaking demand only. Some of the daily peak demand in India is already met with the renewable peaking hydro power capacity. Solar and wind power with 4-hour battery storage systems, as a source of dispatchable generation compared with new coal and new gas plants, is already cost-competitive in India without subsidy. Based on plant load factor (PLF) trends, Ember energy and Centre for Research on Energy and clean Air, CREA project a fall in coal and fossil fuel PLF from 2025-2030 and question long term viability of fossil fuel sources in India. CREA also notes flexibility of renewable energy capacity as a more challenging task than renewable capacity adequacy.

The Union budget 2026 allocated ₹600 crore to the Green Energy Corridor for developing 6,000 km of intra-state transmission, improving renewable evacuation. In addition, funding for the Reformed Linked Distribution Scheme (RLDS) has increased 15% to ₹18,000 crore, focusing on smart metering and network upgrades. India at United Nations Climate Change conference 2021 (COP 26) set target of achieving 500 GW non-fossil fuel target by 2030, more than doubling installed non-fossil fuel capacity at the time, while also targeting net zero emissions by 2070. In 2025, India's power sector emission was reported to be 1,457 MtCO2, accounting for 10% of global power sector emissions.

== Global comparison ==
=== Generation ===
India primarily relies on hydro, solar, wind, biomass, nuclear and fossil fuel sources for electricity. It is the 3rd largest generator of energy.

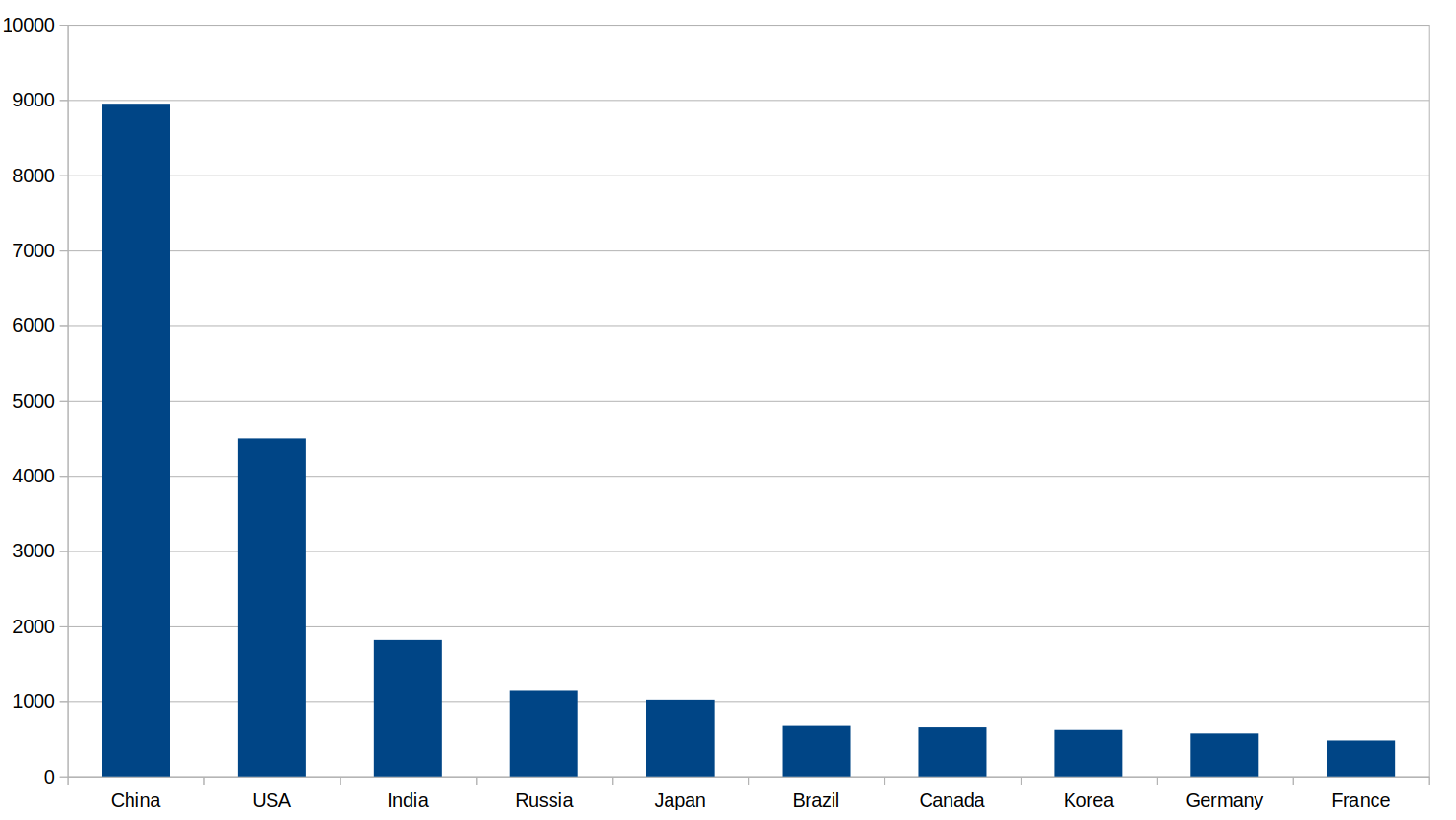
Top 10 Electricity Producers 2022

=== Generation capacity ===
As of April 2026, India has the world's 3rd largest renewable energy installed capacity below China and USA, the world's 3rd highest solar energy capacity, 4th highest wind energy capacity and 5th highest hydroelectric power capacity. Union Minister for New and Renewable Energy and Consumer Affairs, Food and Public Distribution, Shri Pralhad Joshi said India generated 51.5 percent of the country's total electricity demand in July 2025. India's goal is to achieve 500 gigawatts of installed electricity capacity from non-fossil sources by 2030.

=== Attractiveness score ===
Ernst & Young's Renewable Energy Country Attractiveness Index (RECAI) ranking evaluated India in terms of installed capacity and investment in renewable energy as follows:

Global RECAI Rank in June 2024
| Country | Score | RECAI Rank |
|---|---|---|
| USA | 73.6 | 1 |
| China | 72.0 | 2 |
| India | 66.5 | 7 |

Technology-specific RECAI scores in June 2024
| Technology | India | USA | China |
|---|---|---|---|
| Solar PV | 61.8 | 56.5 | 61.5 |
| Solar CSP power plants | 48.7 | 51.2 | 55.8 |
| Hydroelectricity | 48.2 | 39.1 | 52.9 |
| Biofuels | 44.3 | 30.1 | 52.6 |
| Onshore wind power | 51.5 | 59.7 | 53.6 |
| Offshore wind power | 25.7 | 61.2 | 57.8 |
| Geothermal power | 24.7 | 49.2 | 30.6 |
| Battery energy storage system | 31.8 | 57.6 | 57.1 |

== Renewable electricity generation ==
All time maximum solar and wind power generation is 65,804 MW and 28,974 MW as of 7 March 2026, respectively. 29 July 2025 noted India's highest-ever renewable energy generation as a proportion of overall daily electricity generation, with renewable sources generating 51.5 per cent of the country’s total electricity demand of 203 GW on that day.

Raw data
Year-Wise Renewable Energy Generation trend 2014-2025 (in TWh)
| Source | Large Hydro | Small Hydro | Solar | Wind | Bio mass | Other | Total renewable | Total utility power | % Renewable power |
|---|---|---|---|---|---|---|---|---|---|
| 2014–15 | 129.2 | 8.1 | 4.6 | 28.2 | 15.0 | 0.4 | 191.0 | 1,105 | 17.28% |
| 2015–16 | 121.4 | 8.4 | 7.5 | 28.6 | 16.7 | 0.3 | 187.2 | 1,168 | 16.02% |
| 2016–17 | 122.3 | 7.73 | 12.1 | 46.0 | 14.2 | 0.2 | 204.1 | 1,236 | 16.52% |
| 2017–18 | 126.1 | 5.1 | 25.9 | 52.7 | 15.3 | 0.4 | 228.0 | 1,303 | 17.50% |
| 2018–19 | 135.0 | 8.7 | 39.3 | 62.0 | 16.4 | 0.4 | 261.8 | 1,372 | 19.1% |
| 2019–20 | 156.0 | 9.4 | 50.1 | 64.6 | 13.9 | 0.4 | 294.3 | 1,385 | 21.25% |
| 2020–21 | 150.3 | 10.3 | 60.4 | 60.1 | 14.8 | 1.6 | 297.5 | 1,373 | 21.67% |
| 2021–22 | 151.7 | 10.4 | 73.5 | 68.6 | 16.1 | 2.3 | 322.6 | 1,484 | 21.74% |
| 2022–23 | 162.06 | 11.17 | 102.01 | 71.81 | 16.02 | 2.53 | 365.59 | 1,617.42 | 22.60% |
| 2023–24 | 134.05 | 9.49 | 115.98 | 83.39 | 14.24 | 2.75 | 359.89 | 1,739.09 | 20.69% |
| 2024–25 | 132.81 | 10.39 | 114.43 | 73.62 | 9.85 | 2.39 | 343.48 | 1,379.93 | 24.89% |

== Installed renewable electricity generation capacity ==
Since 2019, large hydropower, which falls under the authority of the Ministry of Power, is also counted towards the Ministry of New and Renewable Energy's Renewable Purchase Obligation (RPO) targets. These RPO targets mandate the DISCOMs (Distribution Companies) of various states to source a certain percentage of their power from renewable energy sources, which are divided into three categories: wind, hydropower, and other renewables.

Raw data
Year-Wise Renewable Energy Generation Capacity trend as of 31 March, 2014-2026 (in GW)
| Year | Wind | Bio | | | Hydro | | Solar | | | Total grid capacity | % Renewable (Note: 2014-25 rough estimates) |
| Year | Wind | Biomass | WTE | Off-Grid WTE | Small Hydro | Large Hydro | Mounted | Rooftop | Hybrid | Total grid capacity | % Renewable |
|---|---|---|---|---|---|---|---|---|---|---|---|
| 2014 | 21.0 | 8.0 | 0.1 | 0.1 | 3.8 | 40.5 | 2.6 | | | 285.5 | 26.7% |
| 2015 | 23.4 | 8.3 | 0.1 | 0.1 | 4.1 | 41.3 | 3.7 | | | 274.9 | 29.5% |
| 2016 | 26.8 | 8.7 | 0.1 | 0.2 | 4.3 | 42.8 | 6.8 | | | 305.2 | 29.4% |
| 2017 | 32.3 | 8.8 | 0.1 | 0.2 | 4.4 | 44.5 | 12.3 | | | 326.8 | 31.4% |
| 2018 | 34.1 | 9.4 | 0.1 | 0.2 | 4.5 | 45.3 | 20.6 | 1.1 | | 344.0 | 33.5% |
| 2019 | 35.6 | 9.8 | 0.1 | 0.2 | 4.6 | 45.4 | 26.4 | 1.8 | | 356.1 | 34.8% |
| 2020 | 37.7 | 9.9 | 0.1 | 0.2 | 4.7 | 45.7 | 32.1 | 2.5 | | 370.0 | 35.9% |
| 2021 | 39.2 | 10.1 | 0.2 | 0.2 | 4.8 | 46.2 | 35.6 | 4.4 | | 382.1 | 36.8% |
| 2022 | 40.4 | 10.2 | 0.2 | 0.3 | 4.8 | 46.7 | 45.8 | 6.6 | | 399.5 | 38.8% |
| 2023 | 42.6 | 10.2 | 0.2 | 0.3 | 4.9 | 46.9 | 53.8 | 8.9 | 1.7 | 416.1 | 40.7% |
| 2024 | 45.9 | 10.4 | 0.2 | 0.3 | 5.0 | 46.9 | 64.4 | 11.9 | 2.6 | 442.0 | 42.4% |
| 2025 | 50.0 | 10.7 | 0.3 | 0.5 | 5.1 | 47.7 | 81.0 | 17.0 | 2.9 | 475.2 | 45.3% |
| 2026 | 56.1 | 10.9 | 0.3 | 0.6 | 5.2 | 51.4 | 114.9 | 25.7 | 3.9 | 532.7 | 50.9% |

Region wise / State wise Renewable Energy Cumulative Installed Capacity as of FY 2024-25 (in MW)
| STATES/UTs | 2017-18 | 2018-19 | 2019-20 | 2020-21 | 2021-22 | 2022-23 | 2023-24 | 2024-25 |
NORTHERN REGION
| Haryana | 510.49 | 519.11 | 547.19 | 762.51 | 1242.13 | 1362.09 | 1832.92 | 2449.94 |
| Himachal Pradesh | 10514.30 | 10707.75 | 10768.91 | 10916.61 | 11303.49 | 11330.42 | 11356.16 | 12196.18 |
| Jammu & Kashmir | 3650.22 | 3664.10 | 3581.11 | 3588.11 | 3551.61 | 3556.12 | 3595.37 | 3624.42 |
| Ladakh | 0.00 | 0.00 | 89.00 | 89.00 | 136.44 | 137.79 | 139.79 | 142.59 |
| Punjab | 2626.98 | 2522.38 | 2566.86 | 2743.80 | 2864.12 | 2961.93 | 3163.92 | 3270.42 |
| Rajasthan | 7289.36 | 8223.73 | 10134.97 | 10812.35 | 17451.62 | 22809.05 | 27103.89 | 34136.34 |
| Uttar Pradesh | 3447.25 | 3739.46 | 3900.97 | 4563.07 | 4985.12 | 5282.65 | 5697.17 | 6223.91 |
| Uttarakhand | 4379.83 | 4426.88 | 4437.96 | 4589.24 | 4787.15 | 4909.14 | 4971.94 | 5010.77 |
| Chandigarh | 26.01 | 35.52 | 41.36 | 45.97 | 55.17 | 58.69 | 65.52 | 78.85 |
| Delhi | 123.03 | 180.35 | 218.62 | 246.43 | 270.12 | 302.26 | 340.51 | 397.40 |
| Northern Total | 32567.47 | 34019.28 | 36286.95 | 38357.09 | 46646.97 | 52710.14 | 58267.19 | 67530.82 |
NORTH-EASTERN REGION
| Arunachal Pradesh | 517.00 | 655.69 | 955.98 | 1256.27 | 1257.34 | 1259.75 | 1259.90 | 1270.46 |
| Assam | 378.39 | 414.58 | 433.86 | 437.67 | 504.05 | 534.04 | 542.29 | 582.65 |
| Manipur | 115.28 | 118.66 | 120.43 | 121.84 | 122.70 | 122.73 | 123.49 | 124.24 |
| Meghalaya | 418.85 | 372.18 | 372.18 | 372.18 | 372.48 | 372.48 | 395.07 | 395.11 |
| Mizoram | 100.16 | 101.20 | 102.52 | 103.45 | 104.37 | 133.49 | 135.78 | 135.86 |
| Nagaland | 108.51 | 108.51 | 108.51 | 108.58 | 108.71 | 110.71 | 110.84 | 110.84 |
| Tripura | 24.53 | 24.53 | 28.91 | 29.57 | 30.90 | 33.61 | 34.47 | 37.25 |
| North-Eastern Total | 1662.72 | 1795.35 | 2122.39 | 2429.56 | 2500.55 | 2566.81 | 2601.84 | 2656.41 |
WESTERN REGION
| Chhattisgarh | 785.42 | 850.77 | 864.89 | 886.52 | 989.08 | 1419.82 | 1683.39 | 1828.35 |
| Goa | 1.08 | 4.09 | 5.29 | 7.95 | 20.34 | 26.88 | 45.47 | 58.43 |
| Gujarat | 9339.45 | 10697.72 | 12683.77 | 15204.25 | 18577.90 | 21425.85 | 27461.72 | 33393.03 |
| Madhya Pradesh | 6445.13 | 6864.87 | 7285.75 | 7526.97 | 7703.88 | 8140.08 | 9333.37 | 10827.70 |
| Maharashtra | 11519.21 | 12421.69 | 12822.27 | 13382.85 | 13704.08 | 15804.50 | 17530.12 | 22401.46 |
| Dadar & Nagar Haveli / Daman & Diu | 16.07 | 19.93 | 25.32 | 46.01 | 46.18 | 46.47 | 46.47 | 51.87 |
| Western Total | 28106.36 | 30859.07 | 33687.29 | 37054.55 | 41041.46 | 46863.60 | 56100.54 | 68560.95 |
EASTERN REGION
| Bihar | 346.18 | 352.23 | 365.09 | 376.63 | 387.35 | 389.60 | 450.15 | 539.26 |
| Jharkhand | 320.14 | 267.87 | 273.80 | 288.21 | 307.14 | 324.19 | 395.55 | 434.06 |
| Odisha | 2364.94 | 2681.68 | 2686.38 | 2715.63 | 2771.64 | 2782.57 | 2825.03 | 2958.84 |
| Sikkim | 2222.98 | 2222.99 | 2223.05 | 2223.05 | 2338.79 | 2341.80 | 2344.15 | 2344.67 |
| West Bengal | 1747.46 | 1849.29 | 1888.03 | 1923.44 | 1928.15 | 1962.77 | 1982.13 | 2112.18 |
| Andaman & Nicobar | 12.05 | 17.22 | 17.68 | 34.71 | 34.74 | 35.16 | 35.16 | 35.16 |
| Eastern Total | 7013.75 | 7391.28 | 7454.03 | 7561.67 | 7767.81 | 7836.09 | 8032.17 | 8424.17 |
SOUTHERN REGION
| Andhra Pradesh | 8060.58 | 9560.02 | 10091.40 | 10696.10 | 10821.60 | 10970.20 | 11029.30 | 12114.48 |
| Karnataka | 16241.60 | 17524.40 | 18918.10 | 19149.30 | 19593.80 | 20408.40 | 21441.90 | 23917.64 |
| Kerala | 2282.06 | 2290.71 | 2304.35 | 2428.92 | 2527.20 | 2957.10 | 3229.46 | 3853.38 |
| Tamil Nadu | 13451.72 | 14909.40 | 16588.80 | 17476.70 | 18277.50 | 20098.60 | 22161.60 | 25241.36 |
| Telangana | 6507.48 | 6405.96 | 6442.85 | 6796.59 | 7364.79 | 7510.97 | 7604.40 | 7688.34 |
| Lakshadweep | 3.14 | 3.14 | 3.27 | 3.27 | 3.27 | 3.27 | 4.97 | 4.97 |
| Pondicherry | 0.34 | 3.32 | 5.69 | 9.51 | 13.69 | 35.53 | 49.91 | 54.51 |
| Southern Total | 46546.92 | 50696.95 | 54354.46 | 56560.39 | 58601.85 | 61984.07 | 65521.54 | 72874.68 |
| Others | 47.66 | 49.31 | 49.31 | 49.31 | 49.31 | 49.31 | 49.31 | 49.31 |
| Grand Total | 115944.90 | 124811.20 | 133954.50 | 142012.60 | 156607.90 | 172010.00 | 190572.70 | 220096.35 |

== Targets ==
With the Paris Agreement's Intended Nationally Determined Contributions targets set in 2016, India made commitment of achieving 50% of its total installed electricity capacity from non-fossil fuel sources by 2030 which it achieved five years ahead of date in June 2025.

| Target year | Renewable energy capacity target (GW) | Comments |
|---|---|---|
| 2032 | 600 | National Electricity Plan (NEP) by Central Electricity Authority (CEA) projects 600 GW non-fossil fuel by 2032 and 300 GW of conventional capacity of fossil fuels and nuclear power. |
| 2030 | 500 | Includes nuclear and large hydro power. Set in 2019 at United Nations Climate Change conference 2021 (COP 26), with 15 times solar and 2 times wind power capacity increase compared to April 2016 installed capacity and more than doubling non-fossil installed capacity at the time. |
| 2022 | 175 | Excludes nuclear and large hydro power. Includes 100 GW solar, 60 GW wind, 5 small hydro, 10 GW Biomass power, and 0.168 GW Waste-to-Power. This target was reached on January 31 2025. |

== Sources of renewable energy ==
=== Hydroelectric power ===
As of 2025, India ranks 5th globally for installed hydroelectric power capacity and is the largest installed renewable energy capacity in India, also with the largest share of generated electricity from renewable energy sources in India. Small hydropower, defined to be generated at facilities with nameplate capacities up to 25 MW, comes under the ambit of the Ministry of New and Renewable energy (MNRE); while large hydro, defined as above 25 MW, comes under the ambit of the Ministry of Power.

India's hydroelectric power potential is estimated at 148,700 MW at 60% load factor. For the fiscal year 2025, the total hydroelectric power generated in India was the highest among renewable energy generated despite solar having had 2-3 times more installed capacity, with an average capacity factor of 40%, the highest among other renewable energy sources. India also has a vast potential of pumped hydroelectric energy storage which is used economically for converting the non-dispatchable renewable energy like wind, solar and hydro power in to base/peak load power supply for its energy needs.

=== Solar power ===
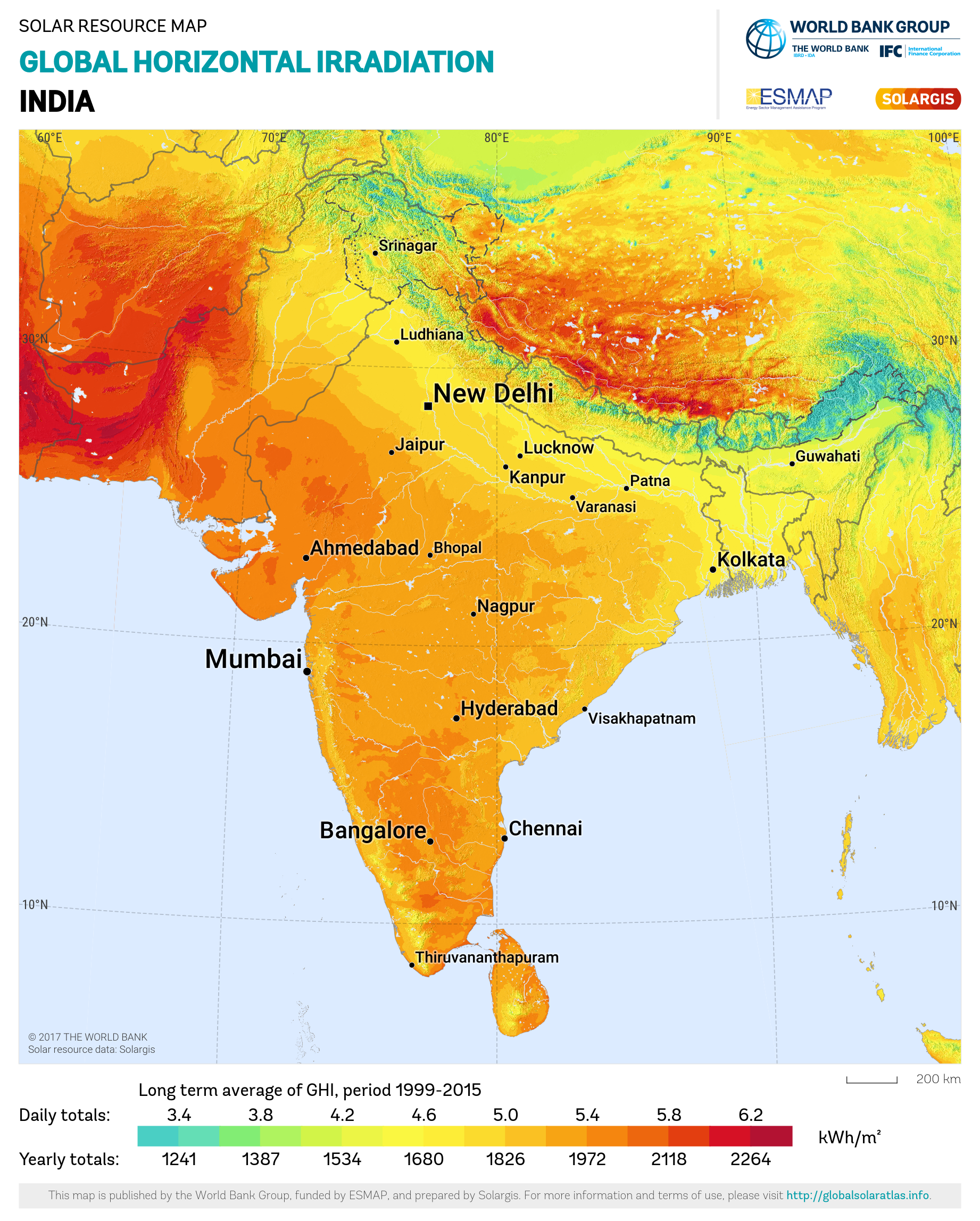
Global Horizontal Irradiance in India.

India is densely populated and has high insolation, an ideal combination for using solar power in India. Solar Energy Corporation of India (SECI), a public sector undertaking, is currently responsible for the development of solar energy industry in India. Solar power in India has been growing at a rate of 113% year-over-year, making it the fastest growing source of electricity in India, growing nearly 20 times in capacity from December 2015 to 2025. As of 2025, it is also the second largest installed renewable energy capacity in India, and is the world's 3rd highest installed solar energy capacity. The solar power potential of India is assessed at 10,830 GW in 2025.

Announced in November 2009, the Government of India launched its Jawaharlal Nehru National Solar Mission under the National Action Plan on Climate Change, inaugurated by former Prime Minister Manmohan Singh on 11 January 2010. Initially expected to be executed in three phases over 12 years, targeting 1000MW, 10GW and 20GW in regular intervals, the third phase was revised to 100GW by 2022 under Narendra Modi Government in the 2015 Union budget of India, which it reached on January 31 2025. The National Solar Mission also aimed to achieve grid parity, that is electricity delivered at the same cost and quality as that delivered on the grid, by 2022 which it achieved in 2017-18, as of which the cost was around ₹4.34 (4.6¢ US) per kWh, which is around 18% lower than the average price for electricity generated by coal-fired plants. The National Solar Mission is also promoted and known by its more colloquial name of "Solar India".

On 30 November 2015, the Prime Minister of India Narendra Modi and the President of France Francois Hollande launched the International Solar Alliance, an alliance of 121 solar rich countries aiming to promote and develop solar power amongst its members and with the objective of mobilising $1 trillion of investment by 2030. The Narendra Modi Government has also introduced the Solar Park Scheme, designed to establish 50 Solar Parks of 500 MW and above with a cumulative capacity of ~38 GW by 2025-26.

India is also the home to the world's first and only 100% solar-powered airport, located at Cochin, Kerala. India also has a wholly 100% solar-powered railway station in Guwhati, Assam. India's first and the largest floating solar power plant was constructed at Banasura Sagar reservoir in Wayanad, Kerala. In 2020, three of the world's five largest solar parks were in India, 2255 MW Bhadla Solar Park in Rajasthan, 2000 MW Pavgada Solar Park Tumkur in Karnataka and 1000 MW Kurnool in Andhra Pradesh.

=== Wind power ===
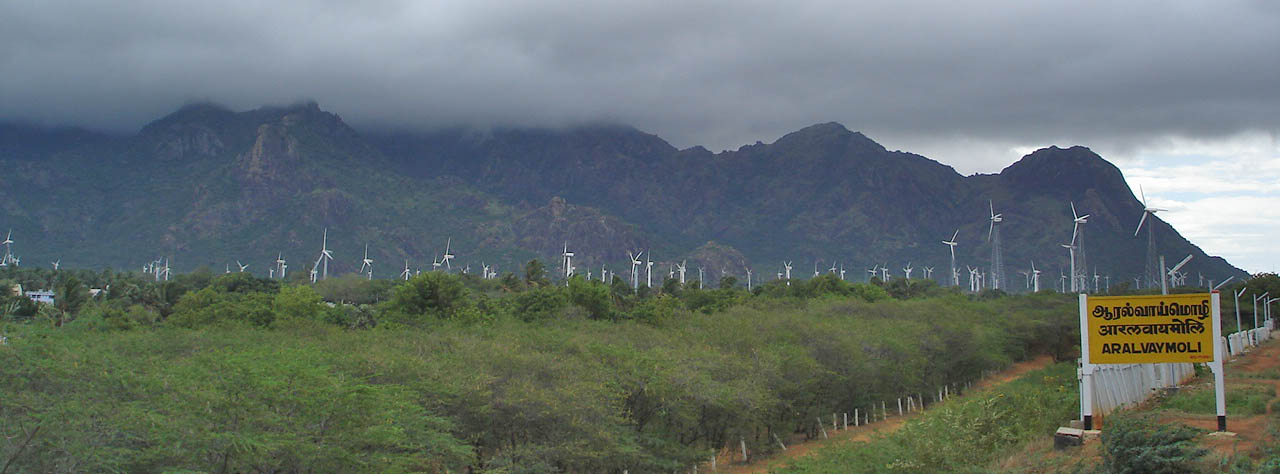
The largest wind farm of India in Muppandal, Tamil Nadu

The development of wind power in India began in the 1990s, and has significantly increased in the last few years. Although a relative newcomer to the wind industry compared to Denmark or US, domestic policy support for wind power has led India to develop the fourth largest installed wind power capacity in the world. As of 2025, the installed capacity of wind power places it in the third highest installed renewable capacity in India, mainly spread across Tamil Nadu, Maharashtra, Gujarat, Rajasthan, Karnataka, Andhra Pradesh and Madhya Pradesh. The onshore wind power potential of India was assessed at 132 GW with minimum 32% CUF at 120 m above the local ground level (agl).

Wind power installations occupy only 2% of the wind farm area facilitating the rest of the area for agriculture, plantations, etc. This means that the same piece of land will be used to house both wind farms and solar panels. The Indian Government's Ministry of New and Renewable Energy announced a new wind-solar hybrid policy in May 2018.

Largest wind farms in India
| Power plant | Location | State | MWe | Producer | Ref |
|---|---|---|---|---|---|
| Gujarat Hybrid Renewable Energy Park | Kutch | Gujarat | 11,500 (wind) + 11,500 (solar) | Adani Group, Suzlon and KPI Green Energy | |
| Muppandal Wind Farm | Muppandal Wind | Tamil Nadu | 1500 | | |
| Jaisalmer Wind Park | Suzlon Energy | Rajasthan | 1300 | | |
| Brahmanvel wind farm | Parakh Agro Industries | Maharashtra | 528 | | |
| Dhalgaon wind farm | Gadre Marine Exports | Maharashtra | 300 | | |
| Kudligi ISTS Park | Fourth Partner Energy | Karnataka | 300 | | |
| Chakala wind farm | Suzlon Energy | Maharashtra | 200 | | |
| Vankusawade Wind Park | Suzlon Energy | Maharashtra | 200 | | |
| Vaspet Wind farm | ReNew Power | Maharashtra | 140 | | |
| Sadla Wind Farm | SJVN | Gujarat | 50 | | |

=== Bioenergy ===
==== Biomass ====
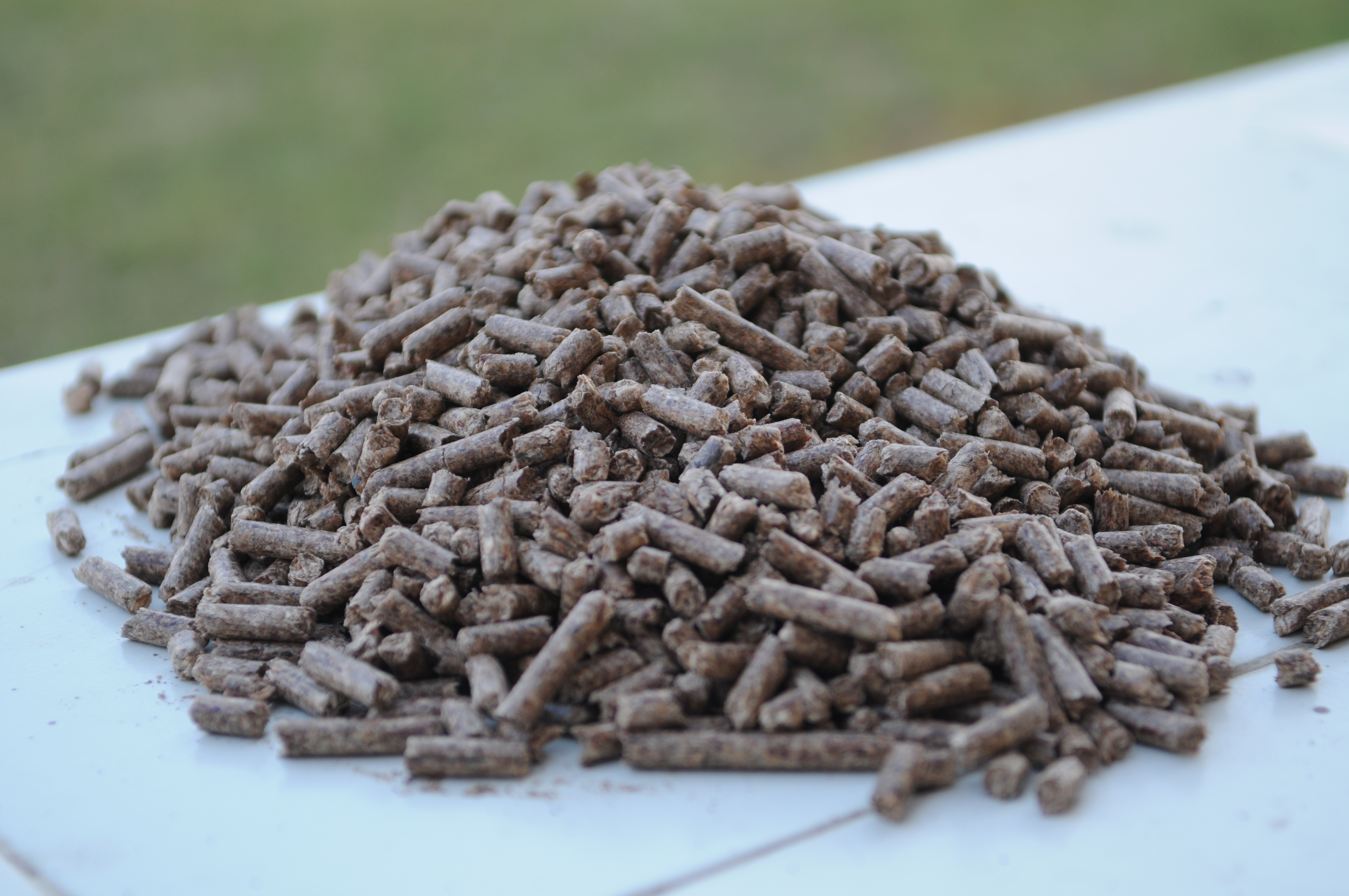
Biomass pellet fuel from India

Biomass is organic matter from living organisms. As a renewable energy source, biomass can either be used directly via combustion to produce heat, or indirectly after converting it to various forms of biofuel using a range of methods which are broadly classified into thermal, chemical, and biochemical methods. Biomass, bagasse, forestry, domestic organic wastes, industrial organic wastes, organic residue from biogas plants, and agricultural residue and waste can all be used as fuel to produce electricity. Nearly 750 million tons of biomass that is not edible by cattle is available annually in India.

The total use of biomass to produce heat in India was nearly 177 Mtoe in 2013. 20% of households in India use biomass and charcoal for cooking purposes. This traditional use of biomass is being replaced by liquefied petroleum gas in rural areas, resulting in increased burning of biomass in fields, This has become a major source of air pollution in nearby towns and cities.

India is an ideal environment for biomass production given its tropical location, sunshine and rains. The country's vast agricultural potential provides agro-residues which can be used to meet energy needs, both in heat and power applications. According to IREDA "Biomass has significant potential to supplement coal consumption and generate energy savings in India." It is estimated that the potential for biomass energy in India includes 16,000 MW from biomass energy and a further 3,500 MW from bagasse cogeneration. Biomass materials that can be used for power generation include bagasse, rice husk, straw, cotton stalk, coconut shells, soya husk, de-oiled cakes, coffee waste, jute wastes, groundnut shells and sawdust.

Torrefied Biomass

Large quantities of imported coal are being used in pulverised coal-fired power stations. Raw biomass cannot be used directly in the pulverised coal mills as it is difficult to grind into fine powder due to caking. However, torrefaction makes it possible for biomass to replace coal. The hot flue gas of existing coal-fired power stations can be used as a heat source for torrefaction, so that biomass can be cofired with coal. Surplus agriculture/crop residue biomass is beginning to be used for this purpose. Instead of shutting down/ retirement of coal-fired power plants due to concerns over pollution, it has been argued that these units can be retrofitted economically to produce electricity from biomass. Biomass contains substantial oxygen and lesser ash to make retrofitting of old units less capital intensive. Biomass power plants can also sell Renewable Energy Certificates, increasing their profitability. Cofiring of biomass up to 10% with coal in existing pulverised coal-fired power stations is successfully implemented in India. Central Government has made cofiring (minimum 5%) of biomass mandatary from October 2022 in all coal-fired plants. When an existing blast furnace is modified to use biomass as its fuel, production of green steel, green hydrogen/urea and green slag cement is feasible.

Various Types of Agro field / Industrial Residues
| Type of Agro residues | Quantity |
|---|---|
| Straws of various pulses & cereals | 225.50 |
| Bagasse | 31.00 |
| Rice Husk | 10.00 |
| Groundnut shell | 11.10 |
| Stalks | 2.00 |
| Various Oil Stalks | 4.50 |
| Others | 65.90 |
| Total | 350.00 |

===== Biogas =====
In 2011, India started a new initiative to demonstrate the utility of medium-size mixed feed biogas-fertilizer pilot plants. The government approved 21 projects with an aggregate capacity of 37,016 cubic meters per day, of which 2 projects were successfully commissioned by December 2011. India commissioned a further 158 projects under its Biogas-based Distributed/Grid Power Generation program, with a total installed capacity of about 2 MW. In 2018, India has set a target of producing 15 million tons of biogas/bio-CNG by installing 5,000 large-scale commercial-type biogas plants which can produce daily 12.5 tons of bio-CNG by each plant. As of May 2022, nearly 35 such plants are in operation. Rejected organic solids from biogas plants can be used in coal plants after torrefaction.

Biogas is primarily methane, and can also be used to generate protein-rich feed for cattle, poultry and fish by growing Methylococcus capsulatus, a bacterium that grows directly on methane. This can be done economically in villages with low requirements for land and water. The carbon dioxide gas produced as a by-product from these units can be used in cheaper production of algae oil or spirulina from algae cultivation, which may eventually substitute for crude oil. Using biogas for protein-rich feed production is also eligible for carbon credits as this sequesters carbon from the atmosphere. There is significant potential to extract useful biomass from breweries, textile mills, fertilizer plants, the paper, and pulp industry, solvent extraction units, rice mills, petrochemical plants and other industries.

The government is exploring several ways to use agro waste or biomass in rural areas to improve the rural economy. For example, biomass gasifier technologies are being explored to produce power from surplus biomass resources such as rice husk, crop stalks, small wood chips and other agro-residues in rural areas. The largest biomass-based power plant in India at Sirohi, Rajasthan has a capacity of 20 MW. During 2011, India installed 25 rice husk based gasifier systems for distributed power generation in 70 remote villages of Bihar, including a total of 1.20 MW in Gujarat and 0.5 MW in Tamil Nadu. In addition, gasifier systems were installed at 60 rice mills in India. The green hydrogen roadmap is constantly evolving in India by consolidating various capabilities at institutional and research centers.

In 2018, India has set target to produce 1.5 crore (15 million) tons (62 mmcmd) of biogas/bio-CNG by installing 5,000 large scale commercial type biogas plants which can produce daily 12.5 tons of bio-CNG by each plant. The rejected organic solids from biogas plants can be used after Torrefaction in the existing coal-fired plants to reduce coal consumption.

The number of small family type biogas plants reached 3.98 million.

===== Bio protein =====
Synthetic methane (SNG) generated using electricity from carbon neutral renewable power or Bio CNG can be used to produce protein rich feed for cattle, poultry and fish economically by cultivating Methylococcus capsulatus bacteria culture with tiny land and water foot print. The carbon dioxide gas produced as by product from these bio protein plants can be recycled in the generation of SNG. Similarly, oxygen gas produced as by product from the electrolysis of water and the methanation process can be consumed in the cultivation of bacteria culture. With these integrated plants, the abundant renewable power potential in India can be converted in to high value food products without any water pollution or green house gas (GHG) emissions for achieving food security at a faster pace with lesser people deployment in agriculture / animal husbandry sector.

===== Waste to energy =====
Every year, about 5.5 crore (55 million) tonnes of municipal solid waste (MSW) and 3,800 crore (38 billion) litres of sewage are generated in the urban areas of India. In addition, large quantities of solid and liquid wastes are generated by industries. Waste generation in India is expected to increase rapidly in the future. As more people migrate to urban areas and as incomes increase, consumption levels are likely to rise, as are rates of waste generation. It is estimated that the amount of waste generated in India will increase at a per capita rate of approximately 1–1.33% annually. This has significant impacts on the amount of land that is and will be needed for disposal, economic costs of collecting and transporting waste, and the environmental consequences of increased MSW generation levels.

India has had a long involvement with anaerobic digestion and biogas technologies. Waste water treatment plants in the country have been established which produce renewable energy from sewage gas. However, there is still significant untapped potential. Also wastes from the distillery sector are on some sites converted into biogas to run in a gas engine to generate onsite power. Prominent companies in the waste to energy sector include:

- A2Z Group of companies
- Hanjer Biotech Energies
- Ramky Enviro Engineers Ltd
- Arka BRENStech Pvt Ltd
- Hitachi Zosen India Pvt Limited
- Clarke Energy
- ORS Group
- Punjab Renewable Energy Systems Pvt. Ltd.

==== Biofuels and organic chemicals ====
Biomass is going to play a crucial role in making India self-sufficient in the energy sector and carbon neutral.

===== Ethanol =====
India imports 85% of petroleum products with an import cost of $55 billion in 2020–21. India has set a target of blending 20% ethanol in petrol by 2025 resulting in import substitution saving of US$4 billion or ₹30,000 crore. India provides financial assistance for manufacturing ethanol from rice, wheat, barley, corn, sorghum, sugarcane, sugar beet, etc. Ethanol market penetration reached its highest figure of a 10% blend rate in India in 2022, and is currently on track to achieve 20% ethanol blending by 2025 as envisioned in the National Policy on Biofuels.

Ethanol is produced from sugarcane molasses and partly from grains and can be blended with petrol. Sugarcane or sugarcane juice may not be used for the production of ethanol in India. The government is also encouraging second generation (2G) commercial production of Ethanol using biomass as feed stock.

===== Biodiesel =====
The market for biodiesel remains at an early stage in India with the country achieving a minimal blend rate with diesel of 0.001% in 2016. Initially development was focussed on the jatropha (jatropha curcas) plant as the most suitable inedible oilseed for biodiesel production. Some Life Cycle Assessment (LCA) studies have shown India's potential for production of low carbon Jatropha and Algae based biodiesel. Development of biodiesel from jatropha has met a number of agronomic and economic restraints and attention is now moving towards other feedstock technologies which utilize used cooking oils, other unusable oil fractions, animal fat and inedible oils. Biodiesel and also Biopropane are produced from non-edible vegetable oils, used cooking oil, waste animal fats, etc.

==== Bioasphalt ====
Carbon neutral Bitumen or bio-bitumen is also produced from biomass such as crop waste to substitute the bitumen derived from crude oil.

=== Hydrogen fuel ===
India's NITI Aayog has identified green hydrogen as a key element of India’s aim to attain a $30 trillion GDP by 2047. It is part of a strategy to drive economic growth while decarbonising large carbon-emitting sectors like cement, aviation, shipping and heavy transport. In September 2025, India's Transport Minister Nitin Gadkari outlined a plan to produce 5 million tonnes of green hydrogen annually by 2030, aiming to attract investments of ₹8 lakh crore and create 6 lakh new jobs. This plan is expected to lower India's crude oil import costs (₹22 lakh cr per year as of 2025) by ₹1 lakh cr per year and reduce carbon emission by 3.6 gigatons by 2050. In September 2025, India started a "Green Hydrogen Highways" trial with a ₹500 cr budget, running 37 hydrogen fuelled trucks on 10 long distance national highway routes in partnership with 3 truck manufacturers (Tata Motors, Ashok Leyland, and Volvo) and 4 hydrogen fuel makers (BPCL, IOCL, NTPC, and Reliance).

=== Geothermal energy ===
India's geothermal energy installed capacity is experimental, and commercial use is insignificant. According to some estimates, India has 10,600 MW of geothermal energy available. MNRE released National Policy on Geothermal Energy, 2025 outlining policies and guidelines for exploration and development of geothermal energy.

In a December 2011 report, India identified six promising geothermal sites for the development of geothermal energy. In decreasing order of potential, these are:

- Tattapani (Chhattisgarh)
- Puga (Jammu & Kashmir)
- Cambay Graben (Gujarat)
- Manikaran (Himachal Pradesh)
- Surajkund (Haryana)
- Chhumathang (Jammu & Kashmir)

Puga and Chumathang area in Ladakh are deemed as the most promising geothermal fields in India.

=== Marine energy ===
Energy from the ocean can be harvested through various methods. However, marine energy generation technologies are not as developed as other renewables.

Tidal Power uses the water flow and ocean level difference caused by tides to generate electricity. In 2011, the Ministry of New & Renewable Energy, Government of India and the Renewable Energy Development Agency of West Bengal jointly approved and agreed to implement India's first mini tidal power project, with a capacity of 3.75 MW, in Durgaduani Creek, Sundarban.

Wave power generates power from surface waves or from pressure fluctuations below the sea surface. A report from the Ocean Engineering Centre, at the Indian Institute of Technology Madras estimated the annual wave energy potential along the Indian coast is 5 to 15 MW/metre, suggesting a theoretical maximum potential for electricity harvesting along India's 7500-kilometer coastline of about 40 GW.However, the realistic economical potential is likely to be considerably less than this.

The third approach to harvesting marine energy is ocean thermal energy conversion (OTEC). Oceans have a thermal gradient, the surface being much warmer than the deeper levels of the ocean. This thermal gradient may be used to power a modified Rankine engine. In 2003, India's National Institute of Ocean Technology (NIOT) attempted to build and deploy a 1 MW demonstration OTEC plant in collaboration with Saga University of Japan.

== See also ==
- Energy in India
- Energy policy of India
- Electricity sector in India
- List of power stations in India
- Bureau of Energy Efficiency
- Ministry of New and Renewable Energy
- International Renewable Energy Agency
- World energy resources and consumption
- Renewable energy by country
- Renewable energy in Asia
- Renewable energy commercialization
- Renewable energy debate
- Fossil fuel phase-out
- List of countries by electricity production from renewable sources
