= Jatropha biodiesel in India =

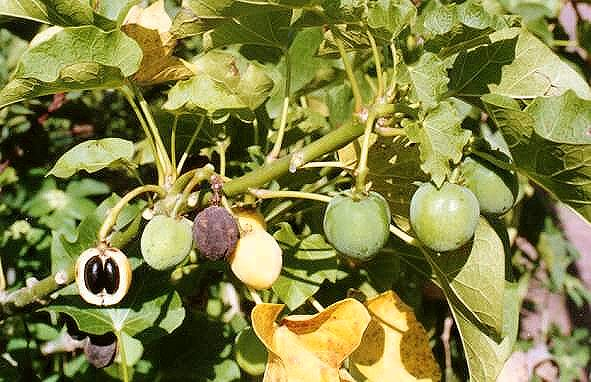
Seeds from the Jatropha curcas plant are used for the production of bio-fuel, a crucial part of Barath's plan to attain energy sustainability.

Biofuel development in India centres mainly around the cultivation and processing of Jatropha plant seeds, which are very rich in oil, ranging from 27 to 40%, and averaging 34.4%. The drivers for this are historic, functional, economic, environmental, moral and political.

== History ==
Jatropha curcas is a plant likely native to Mexico and Central America; it has been spread worldwide in tropical regions for medicinal uses. Jatropha oil has been used in India for several decades as biodiesel for the diesel fuel requirements of remote rural and forest communities; jatropha oil can be used directly after extraction (i.e. without refining) in diesel generators and engines. India's total biodiesel requirement is projected to grow to 3.6 million tonnes in 2011–12, with the positive performance of the domestic automobile industry. Analysis from Frost & Sullivan, Strategic Analysis of the Indian Biofuels Industry, reveals that the market is an emerging one and has a long way to go before it catches up with global competitors.

The Government is currently implementing an ethanol-blending program and considering initiatives in the form of mandates for biodiesel. Due to these strategies, the rising population, and the growing energy demand from the transport sector, biofuels can be assured of a significant market in India. On 12 September 2008, the Indian Government announced its 'National Biofuel Policy'. It aims to meet 20% of India's diesel demand with fuel derived from plants. That will mean setting aside 140,000 square kilometres of land. Presently fuel yielding plants cover less than 5,000 square kilometres.

== Rationale for the development of Jatropha in India ==
Jatropha has the potential to provide economic benefits at the local level since under suitable management it has the potential to grow in dry marginal non-agricultural lands, thereby allowing villagers and farmers to leverage non-farm land for income generation. As well, increased Jatropha oil production delivers economic benefits to India on the macroeconomic or national level as it reduces the nation's fossil fuel import bill for diesel production (the main transportation fuel used in the country); minimising the expenditure of India's foreign-currency reserves for fuel allowing India to increase its growing foreign currency reserves (which can be better spent on capital expenditures for industrial inputs and production). And since Jatropha oil is carbon-neutral, large-scale production will improve the country's carbon emissions profile. Finally, since no food producing farmland is required for producing this biofuel (unlike corn or sugar cane ethanol, or palm oil diesel), it is considered the most politically and morally acceptable choice among India's current biofuel options; it has no known negative impact on the production of the massive amounts grains and other vital agriculture goods India produces to meet the food requirements of its massive population (circa 1.1 Billion people as of 2008). Other biofuels which displace food crops from viable agricultural land such as corn ethanol or palm biodiesel have caused serious price increases for basic food grains and edible oils in other countries.

== Jatropha incentives in India ==
Jatropha incentives in India is a part of India's goal to achieve energy independence by the year 2018. Jatropha oil is produced from the seeds of the Jatropha curcas, a plant that can grow in wastelands across India, and the oil is considered to be an excellent source of bio-diesel. India is keen on reducing its dependence on coal and petroleum to meet its increasing energy demand and encouraging Jatropha cultivation is a crucial component of its energy policy. However, in recent times the bio-fuel policy has come under critical review, on the way it has been promoted.

Large plots of waste land have been selected for Jatropha cultivation and will provide much needed employment to the rural poor of India. Businesses are also seeing the planting of Jatropha as a good business opportunity. The Government of India has identified 400,000 square kilometres (98 million acres) of land where Jatropha can be grown, hoping it will replace 20% of India's diesel consumption by 2011. Life-cycle analysis studies have shown favourable energy balance for production of jatropha-based biodiesel in India and also a potential GHG emission saving of 33-42% compared to fossil-based diesel.

== Implementation ==
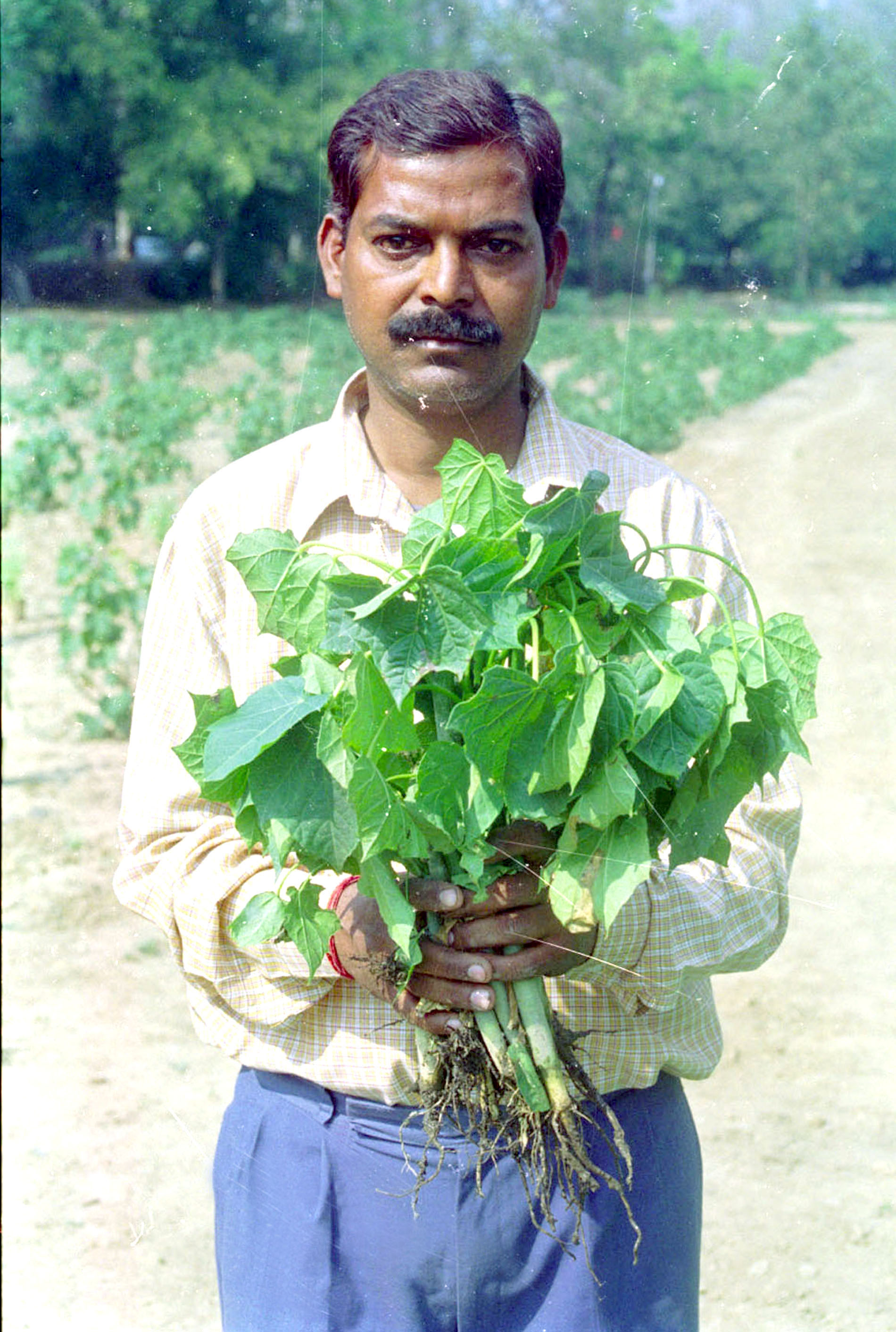
A man showing the 'Jatropa' plant used in producing Bio-Diesel at Rashtrapati Bhawan in New Delhi on March 14, 2005

Dr. Abdul Kalam, the 11th President of India, was one of the strong advocates of Jatropha cultivation for the production of bio-diesel, citing the suitability of a large amount of wasteland in India for the cultivation of the plant.

The Government of India announced a National Biofuel Policy in 2008 that anticipated that around 20% of the country's domestic diesel demand would be met by biofuels including Jatropha-based fuels. Circa 2010, the State Bank of India signed a Memorandum of Understanding with D1 Mohan, a joint venture of D1 Oils plc, to loan around 1.3 billion rupees to farmers in India for the cultivation of Jatropha, with the proviso that farmers would be able to pay the loans back by using the profits of selling the Jatropha seeds to D1 Mohan.

=== Indian Railways ===
In 2005, the Indian Railways announced plans to plant Jatropha trees on semi-arid land outside of railway stations in India as a part of its plans to make those lands commercially viable and to generate bio-diesel for use in its vehicles. At the time, the railways was facing diesel purchasing costs of around ₹4,000 crore on diesel alone and was seeking to reduce cost burdens.

=== Southern India ===
==== Andhra Pradesh ====
Andhra Pradesh has entered into a formal agreement with Reliance Industries for Jatropha planting. The company has selected 200 acres (0.81 km^{2}) of land at Kakinada to grow jatropha for high quality bio-diesel fuel.

==== Kerala ====
As of 2006, Kerala planned a massive Jatropha planting campaign.

==== Karnataka ====
Farmers in semi-arid regions of Karnataka are planting Jatropha as it is well suited to those conditions.

Labland Biodiesel is a Mysore-based Private Limited Company. Since the year 2002, the Company is active in Biodiesel and Jatropha curcas-based Research and Development activities headed by its chairman and managing director, Dr. Sudheer Shetty. Jatropha seeds are used in ksrtc, bmtc, government buses

==== Tamil Nadu ====
Tamil Nadu is aggressively promoting the plantation of Jatropha to help farmers over come the loss due to irregular rains during the past few years. The government has contracted the development of Jatropha in Tamil Nadu in a large scale to four entrepreneurs. Namely M/s Mohan Breweries and Distilleries Limited. M/s Shiva Distilleries Limited, M/s Dharani Sugars and Chemicals Limited and M/s Riverway Agro Products Private Ltd. Currently the firms have cultivated the plant in about 3 square kilometres as against the goal of 50 km². The government of Tamil Nadu has also abolished purchase tax on Jatropha., but presently government has announced to reduce the 7.5% tolgate charges to 2.5%.

=== Western India ===
==== Rajasthan ====
Jatropha is ideally suited for cultivation in Rajasthan as it needs very little water which is scarce in Rajasthan. Jatropha plantations have been undertaken in Udaipur, Kota, Sikar, Banswara, Chittor and Churu districts. In the Udaipur district, Jatropha curcas is planted in agroforestry formats with food or cash crops on marginal lands (in India often called waste lands). As its leaves are toxic and therefore non-palatable to livestock, they remain intact in their sapling stage, unlike most other tree saplings. These Jatropha Seeds are very much favourable for the Germination. Udaipur is the major supplier of the Jatropha Seeds especially for the Germination. Many companies and Govt are taking interest to collect best seeds from Udaipur. Bulk Agro (I) Pvt Ltd is the elite of the suppliers.

==== Maharashtra ====
In September 2007, the Hindustan Petroleum Corporation Limited (HPCL) joined hands with the Maharashtra State Farming Corporation Ltd (MSFCL) for a jatropha seed-based bio-diesel venture. As part of the project, jatropha plants would be grown on 500 acres (2 km²) in Nashik and Aurangabad. In November 2005, the Maharashtra Government aimed to cultivate jatropha on 600 km² in the state, with half the land going to the public sector and the other half to the private sector. On 1 July 2006, Pune Municipal Corporation took the lead among Indian cities in using bio-diesel from jatropha in over 100 public buses.

Gulabrao Kale studied the prospects of plantation in the Ahmednagar district in Maharashtra and under his guidance, Govind Gramin Vikas Pratishthan (GOGVIP), decided to plan under DPAP program of government. Initially, it was a very difficult task to make farmers ready for the Jatropha plantation. When 20–25 farmers were offered the plan, only 2–3 farmers were convinced to plant jatropha. Lack of literacy was a big hindrance in convincing the farmers. It was hard to convince them about the future benefits of the plant and its potential to produce bio-diesel, an equivalent of diesel. But after continuous efforts more than 1000 farmers are working with the GOGVIP for the Jatropha planting program now.

For this task, under the watershed development program, GOGVIP took an area of 10.92 square kilometres for making CCTs. To date, more than 2 million Jatropha plants have been planted in the target area of the five villages of Vankute, Dhoki, Dhotre, Dhavalpuri and Gajdipoor in the project. The villages are in the remote locations and that made connecting them with GOGVIP a difficult task.

=== Eastern India ===
D1 Williamson Magor Bio Fuel Limited was a joint venture company between D1 Oils plc, UK and Williamson Magor group. This biodiesel initiative was incorporated in July 2006. Advocating the creation of energy from renewable resources, the company had promoted Jatropha Plantations on the wasteland possessed by the farmers in the North Eastern States, Orissa and Jharkhand. The Company had a comprehensive network to manufacture bio-diesel from the oilseeds harvested by the farmers.

Biodiesel initiative hoped to benefit local communities through commercial plantation of Jatropha. NGOs and self-help groups were also involved.

==== Chhattisgarh ====
Chhattisgarh has decided to plant 160 million saplings of jatropha in all its 16 districts during 2006 with the aim of becoming a bio-fuel self-reliant state by 2015. Chhattisgarh plans to earn Rs. 40 billion annually by selling seeds after 2010. The central government has provided Rs. 135 million to Chhattisgarh in 2013 for developing jatropha nursery facilities.

In May 2005, Chief Minister Raman Singh became the first head of a state government to use jatropha diesel for his official vehicle. Chhattisgarh plans to replace with jatropha fuel all state-owned vehicles using diesel and petrol by 2007 . Chhattisgarh Bio-fuel Development Authority now oversees the production of the Jatropha curcas seed as a rich source of bio-diesel. Chhattisgarh government tie up with public sector company Indian oil to produce biodiesel and maintain jatropha plantation in Chhattisgarh name of this company Indian oil CREDA Biofules Ltd. this company is established on 2009 at sankar nagar raipur this company covered all district of Chhattisgarh to plantation of Jatropha curcas.

== Practices ==
The Project on Development of Agronomic practices for Jatropha curcas is being implemented, with the financial assistance of DBT, New Delhi. Dr. Panjabrao Deshmukh Krishi Vidyapeeth, India has Planted Jatropha on 3 square kilometres, with the financial assistance of National Oilseeds and Vegetable oils development Board.

== Outcomes ==
As of the late 2010s and early 2020s, the projects around Jatropha-based biodiesel are widely considered to have been failures due to shortages in seed supplies, high costs for plantation and maintenance, and reductions in global demand for biodiesels. Consequently, there has been a shift towards other sources of biofuel, such as from rice paddy in Chhattisgarh.

== See also ==
- Renewable energy in India
- Solar power in India
- Wind power in India
- Hydroelectric power in India
- Biofuels by region
- Food vs. fuel
- Renewable energy by country
