= Tulsi Tanti =

Indian businessman (1958–2022)

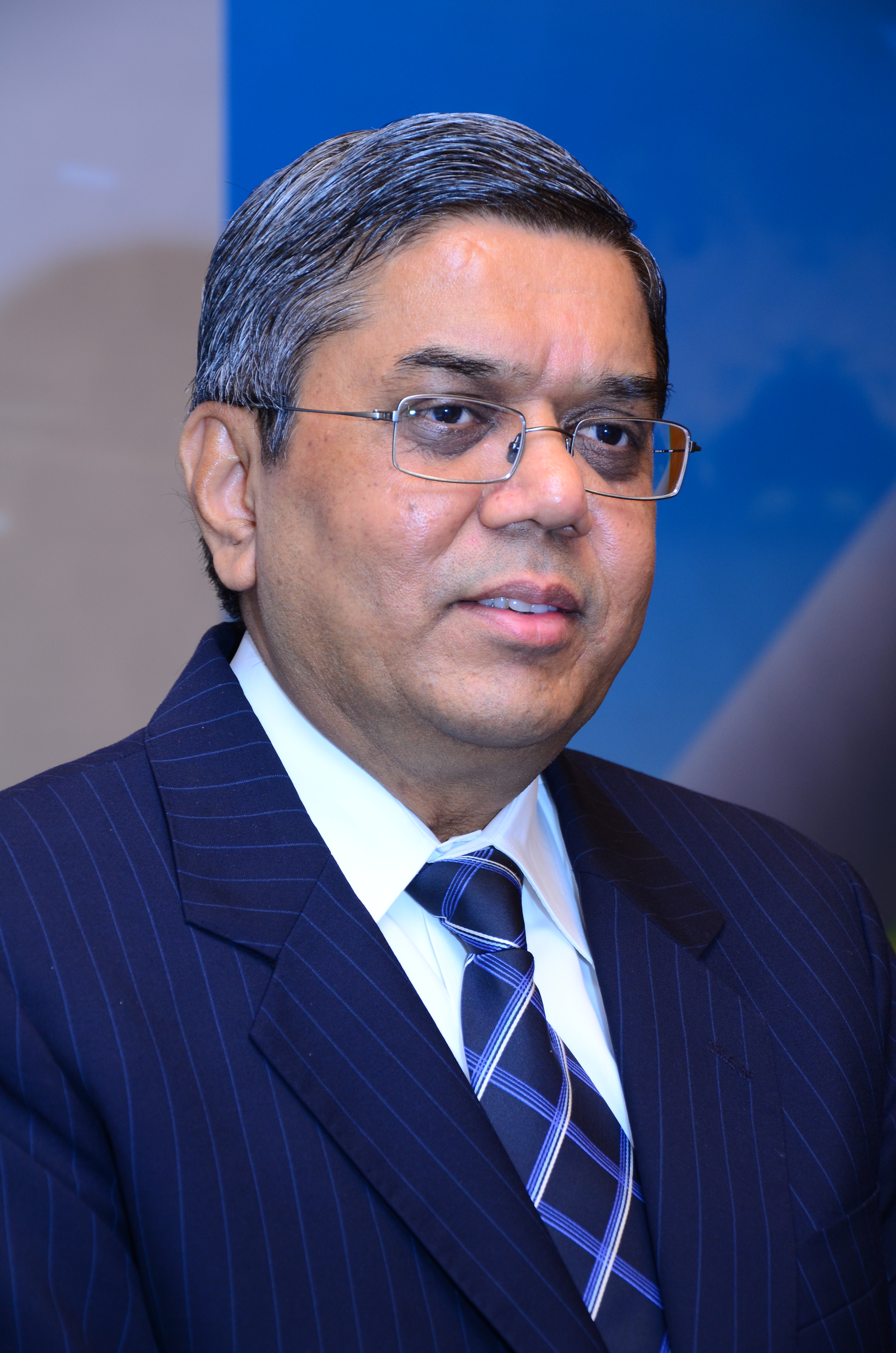
Tulsi Tanti

Tulsi Tanti (2 February 1958 – 1 October 2022) was an Indian businessman best known for being the founder and chairman-cum-managing director of Suzlon. He was known as the "Wind man of India" (or India's 'Wind Man') and was the president of the Indian Wind Turbine Manufacturers Association apart from being the chairman of ZF Wind Power Antwerpen, the Belgium-based manufacturer of wind turbine gearboxes since May 2006.

Tanti was acknowledged as one of the two richest energy entrepreneurs in the world in 2006, and Suzlon was the largest wind power company in the world by market capitalization. He was in the eighth place in the India's Global Wealth Club List but also made it to the Forbes' list of Billionaire Blowups of 2008. In 2009, he had been awarded the Champions of the Earth award by UNEP in the Entrepreneurial Vision category.

An engineer by profession, Tanti completed his Graduation in engineering from Birla Vishvkarma Mahavidyalaya, Tanti was originally the owner and manager of a small textile firm; beleaguered by erratic electricity supply, he bought a couple of wind turbines to solve the problem, and eventually branched out into wind power.

Tanti died of cardiac arrest on 1 October 2022, at the age of 64. After his demise Vinod R Tanti is the chairman and Girish Tanti is the Vice Chairman of Suzlon
