= Muppandal =

Coordinates: 8°15′39″N 77°32′55″E

Muppandal Aralvoimozhi
- Village
- Nickname: Aramboli
- Interactive map of Muppandal
- Country: India
- State: Tamil Nadu
- District: Kanyakumari district

Languages
  - Official: Tamil
- Time zone: UTC+5:30 (IST)

Muppandal is a small village on the southern tip of India in Kanyakumari District, in the state of Tamil Nadu. It is located in a hilly region where wind from the Arabian Sea gusts through mountain passes.

There is a legend that Avvaiyar had arranged for a marriage, to which she invited the sovereigns of the Chera, Chola and Pandya kingdoms. This is located in between Tirunelveli and Kanyakumari Highway (NH), the nearest college from muppandal is Jayamatha Engineering College The kings erected pandals (mandapams) in the respective places allotted to them and this eventually led to the place being called Muppandal (meaning 'three pandals').

== Wind power ==
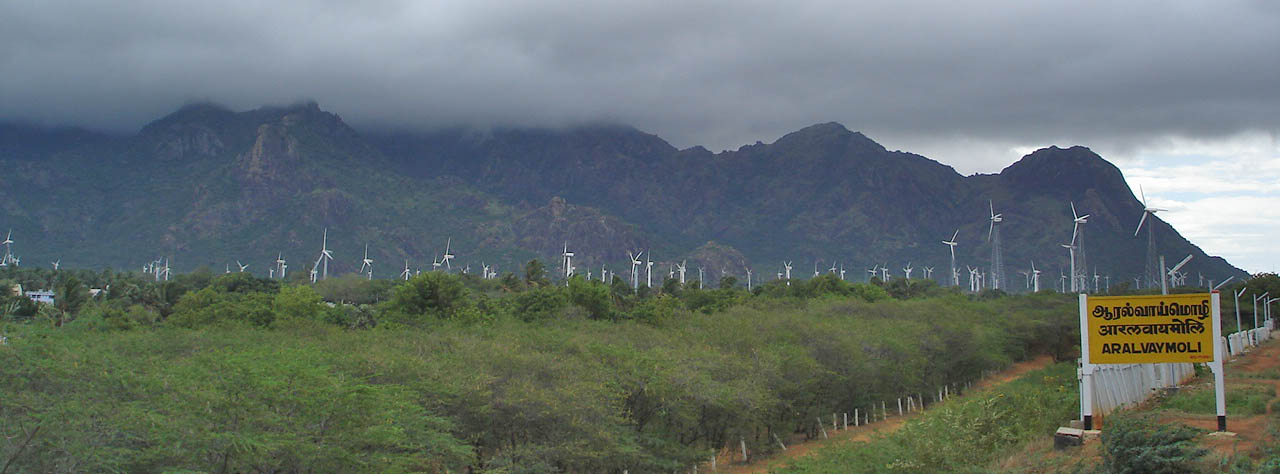
Aralvaimozhi railway station with a view of wind farm

The once-impoverished village benefited from the building of the nearby Muppandal Wind Farm, a renewable energy source, which supplies the villagers with electricity for work. This is the second largest onshore wind farm in the world. The village had been selected as the showcase for India's $2 billion clean energy program which provides foreign companies with tax breaks for establishing fields of wind turbines in the area. Coordinates - [8°15'39"N 77°32'55"E]. Now huge power-producing windmills tower over the palm trees. The village has attracted wind energy producing companies creating thousands of new jobs, dramatically raising the incomes of villagers.

The suitability of Muppandal as a site for wind farms stems from its geographical location as it has access to the seasonal monsoon winds.

Now there are more sites identified for windmills around this area (Muppandal and surroundings) and wind energy generation capacity is estimated to be around 1500 MW, which is about 20% of that of India.

== Shrine ==
In Muppandal, there is an image of Avvaiyar in the temple dedicated to the poet. According to tradition, this is the spot where she died.

== See also ==
- Muppandal Wind Farm
- Wind power
- Wind power in India
- Solar power in India
