= Muppandal Wind Farm =

Wind farm in Southern India

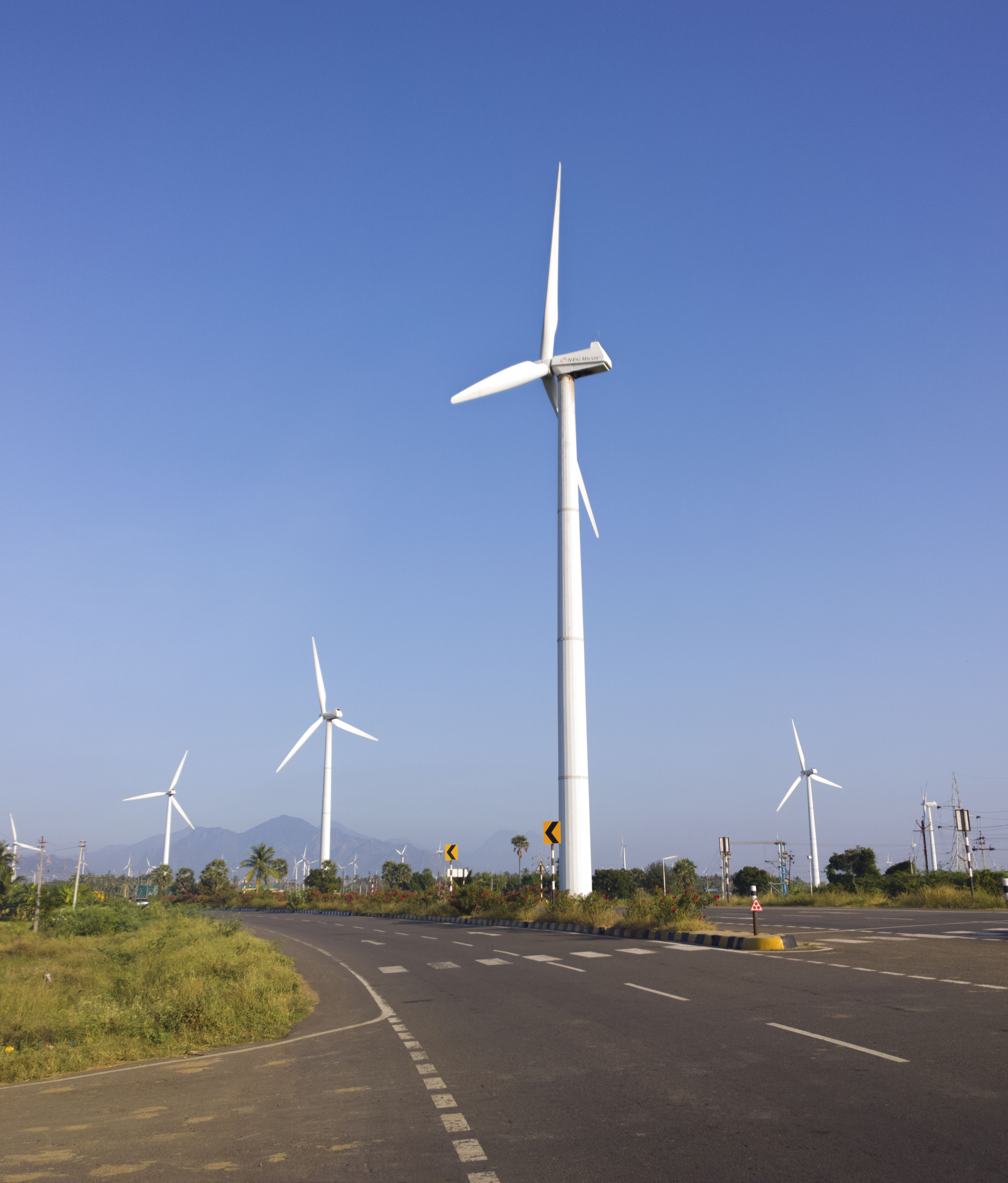
- Location of Muppandal Wind Farm in Tamil Nadu, India
- Country: India
- Location: Muppandal - Aralvaimozhi, Kanyakumari district, Tamil Nadu
- Coordinates: 8°15′0″N 77°35′24″E
- Status: Operational
- Commission date: 1986
- Owner: Multiple

Wind farm
- Type: Onshore

Power generation
- Make and model: Suzlon; NEG Micon; Vestas; Enercon
- Nameplate capacity: 1,500 MW

The Muppandal Wind Farm, located in Muppandal, Kanyakumari district, Tamil Nadu, is India's largest operational onshore wind farm. The project was developed by Tamil Nadu Energy Development Agency. The Muppandal Wind Farm's installed capacity is 1,500 MW, which makes it the 4th-largest operational onshore wind farm in the world.

== See also ==
- Wind power in India
- List of onshore wind farms
