= Jaisalmer Wind Park =

Wind farm in Rajasthan, India

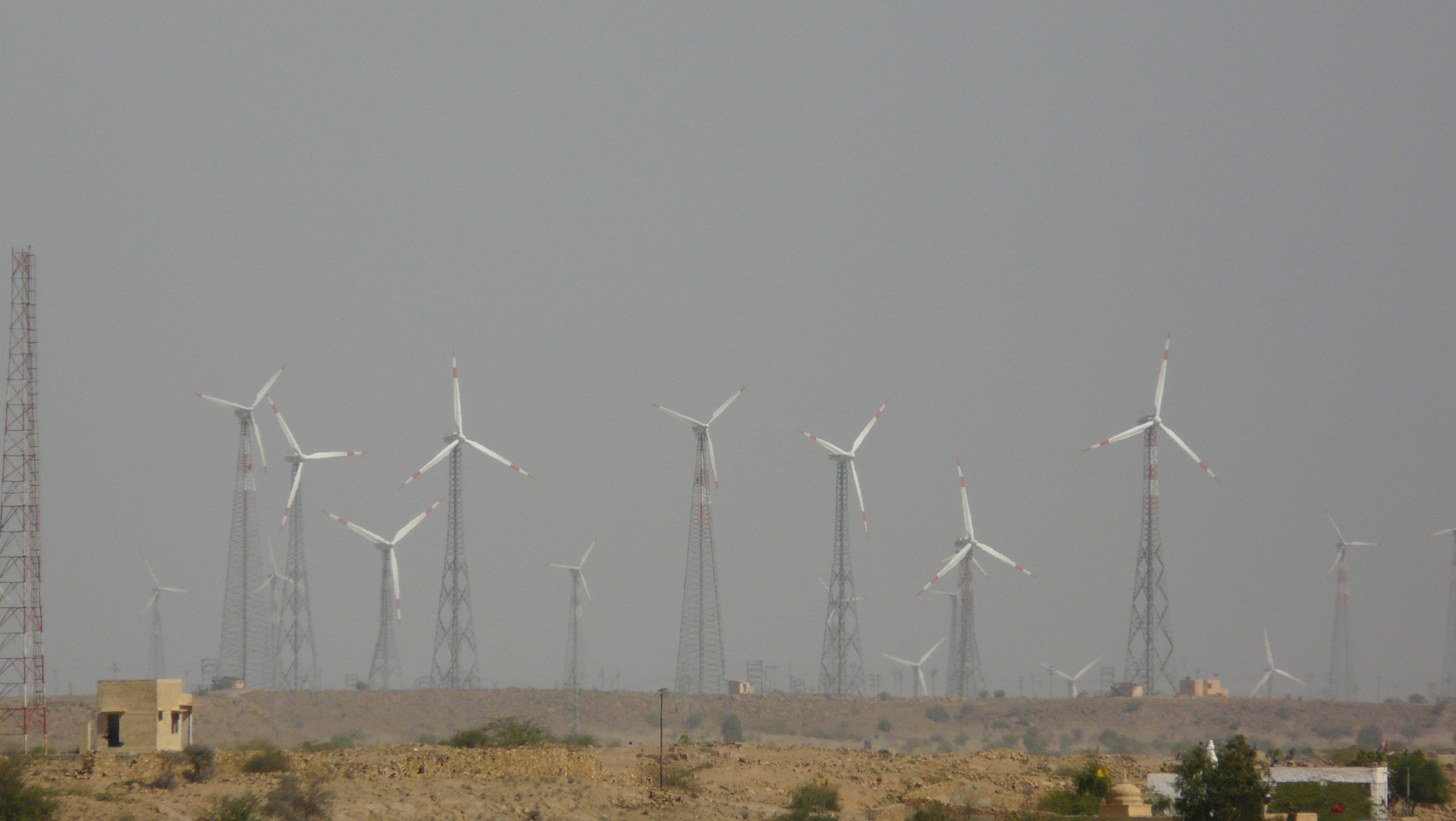
- Location of Jaisalmer Wind Park in Rajasthan, India
- Country: India
- Location: Amarsagar - Badabaug - Tejuva - Soda Mada, Jaisalmer district, Rajasthan, India
- Coordinates: 26°55′12″N 70°54′0″E
- Status: Operational
- Commission date: 2001

Wind farm
- Type: Onshore
- Site area: 5,000 km^{2} (1,900 sq mi)

Power generation
- Units operational: Suzlon’s entire portfolio ranging from 350 kW model to S9X – 2.1 MW series
- Make and model: Suzlon
- Nameplate capacity: 1,064 MW

External links
- Commons: Related media on Commons

The Jaisalmer Wind Park is India's second largest and globally the fifth-largest operational onshore wind farm. This project is located in Jaisalmer district, Rajasthan, Western India.

== History ==
The Jaisalmer Wind Park project was initiated in 2001. The wind park by developed by Suzlon Energy and comprises Suzlon's entire wind portfolio – ranging from the earliest 350 kW model to the latest S9X – 2.1 MW series. Its installed capacity is 1,064 MW, which makes it one of the world's largest operational onshore wind farms.

By April 2012, its combined installed capacity crossed 1000 MW i.e.,1 GW. At 1064 MW, the wind park became the largest of its kind in India, and one of the largest wind farms in the world.

In 2015, 24 wind turbine generator of 2.1 MW each were installed at Tejuva, taking the overall production to 50.4 MW.

== Gallery ==
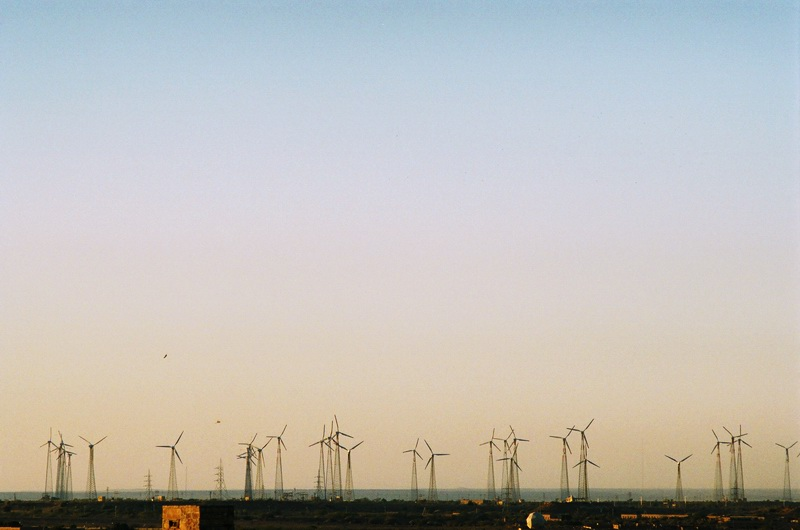
View from Jaisalmer's Fort: part of Jaisalmer Wind Park

== See also ==
- Wind power in India
- List of largest power stations in the world
