= ZF Wind Power Antwerpen =

Belgian manufacturer and supplier of wind turbine gearboxes

- Type: Public company
- Industry: Wind power industry
- Founded: 1923
- Headquarters: Lommel, Belgium
- Key people: Felix Henseler (CEO)
- Products: Gearboxes
- Revenue: €750 million (2018)
- Number of employees: 3,500 (2018)
- Parent: ZF Friedrichshafen
- Website: www.zf.com/windpower

ZF Wind Power Antwerpen is a business unit of ZF Friedrichshafen, that designs, manufactures and supplies wind turbine gearboxes.

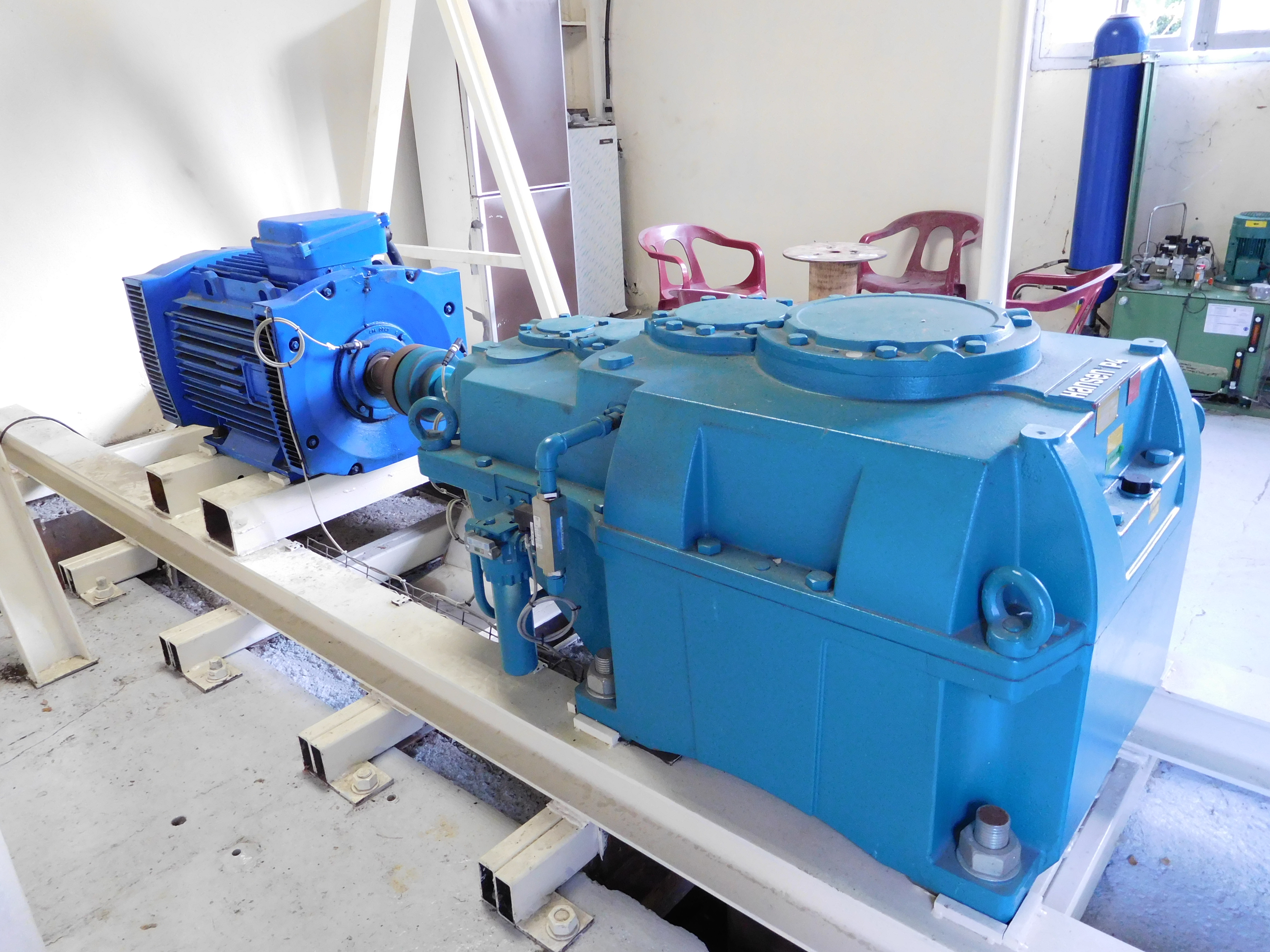
Hansen transmission

== History ==
The company was founded in 1923 in Antwerp under the name La Mécanique Générale (LMG). The company soon focused on the manufacturing of specialized transmission units, under engineer David Hansen. In 1939 the company moved to Edegem, to ensure there was sufficient room for future expansions. In 1950, Hansen founded the subsidiary Machinery & Gear Hansen (MGH). LMG and MGH merged in 1966, and in 1972 it was renamed to Hansen Transmissions International (HTI). From 1979, the company increasingly focused on the supply of gearboxes to the growing wind energy generation sector.

After a series of takeovers in the period after 1966, Hansen Transmissions was acquired on March 17, 2006, by Suzlon Energy through its subsidiary, AE-Rotor Holding BV, for €465 million in cash from Allianz Capital Partners and Apax Partners. The transaction was the second largest foreign acquisition by an Indian company to date. The rationale of the acquisition was to secure access to the crucial supply of gearboxes for the wind turbine manufacturer. Hansen hoped to benefit from the regional knowledge and expertise of Suzlon Energy in its expansions in India.

Yet Suzlon subsequently struggled with a high debt burden. In December 2007, Hansen transmission was listed on the London Stock Exchange. Suzlon continued to sell pieces of Hansen Transmissions in the years that followed, most notably in November 2009, selling a 35.22% share to repay an outstanding acquisition loan facility. The remaining share of Suzlon in Hansen was 26.1%, making it the largest shareholder.

In September 2011 it was acquired by ZF Friedrichshafen AG, and in December 2011 the company was renamed to ZF Wind Power Antwerpen (Belgium). In December 2015, ZF took over the wind turbine gearbox segment of Bosch Rexroth.

ZF Wind Power Antwerpen currently operates six manufacturing plants with an annual output capacity of approximately 16,000 MW. The company manufactures in Belgium, India, Germany, the US and China.

Today, ZF ranks among the world's leading suppliers of innovative wind power gearboxes, with an estimated 25% share of the global market.
