= Hydroelectric power in India =

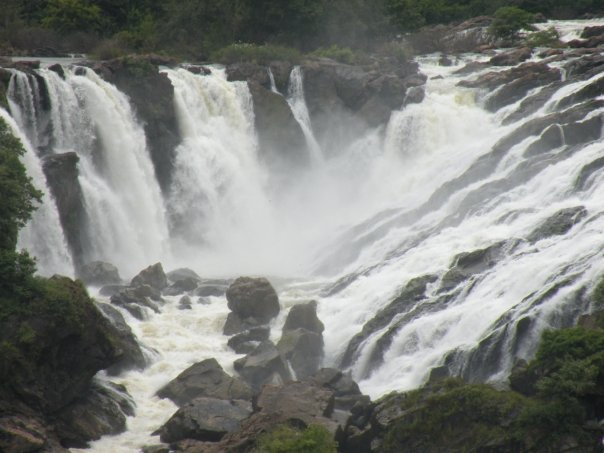
Shivanasamudra Falls

India is 5th globally for installed hydroelectric power capacity. As of 31 March 2020, India's installed utility-scale hydroelectric capacity was 46,000 MW, or 12.3% of its total utility power generation capacity. Additional smaller hydroelectric power units with a total capacity of 4,683 MW (1.3% of its total utility power generation capacity) have been installed. India's hydroelectric power potential is estimated at 148,700 MW at 60% load factor. In the fiscal year 2019–20, the total hydroelectric power generated in India was 156 TWh (excluding small hydro) with an average capacity factor of 38.71%.

The hydroelectric power plants at Darjeeling and Shivanasamudra were established in 1898 and 1902, respectively. They were among the first in Asia and India has been a dominant player in global hydroelectric power development. India also imports surplus hydroelectric power from Bhutan.

Small hydropower, defined to be generated at facilities with nameplate capacities up to 25 MW, comes under the ambit of the Ministry of New and Renewable energy (MNRE); whilst large hydro, defined as above 25 MW, comes under the ambit of the Ministry of Power. Koyna Hydroelectric Project is the largest completed hydroelectric power plant in India, with a power capacity of 1960 MW.

India's hydroelectric power output dropped by 16.3% in the fiscal year ending March 31, 2024, the largest decline in 38 years, primarily due to low rainfall. This decrease led to hydroelectricity's share of India's total power generation falling to a historic low of 8.3%. As a result, the country's reliance on coal increased, with hydro generation reaching a five-year low of 146 billion kWh. The lack of rainfall was attributed to the lightest rainfall since 2018 and potentially influenced by the El Niño weather pattern. Consequently, hydroelectric power's role in the Indian energy mix is diminishing, with its reliability questioned due to erratic weather patterns.

Advantages of hydroelectric plants are not limited to power generation. In fact, many of its other services are becoming increasingly important in the context of the energy transition and climate change. Hydropower plants offer a broad range of services to the grid that includes balancing and ancillary services. Additionally, hydropower can provide water services such as flood control, irrigation control, water distribution, recreational facilities, and wastewater control.

== Hydroelectric potential ==
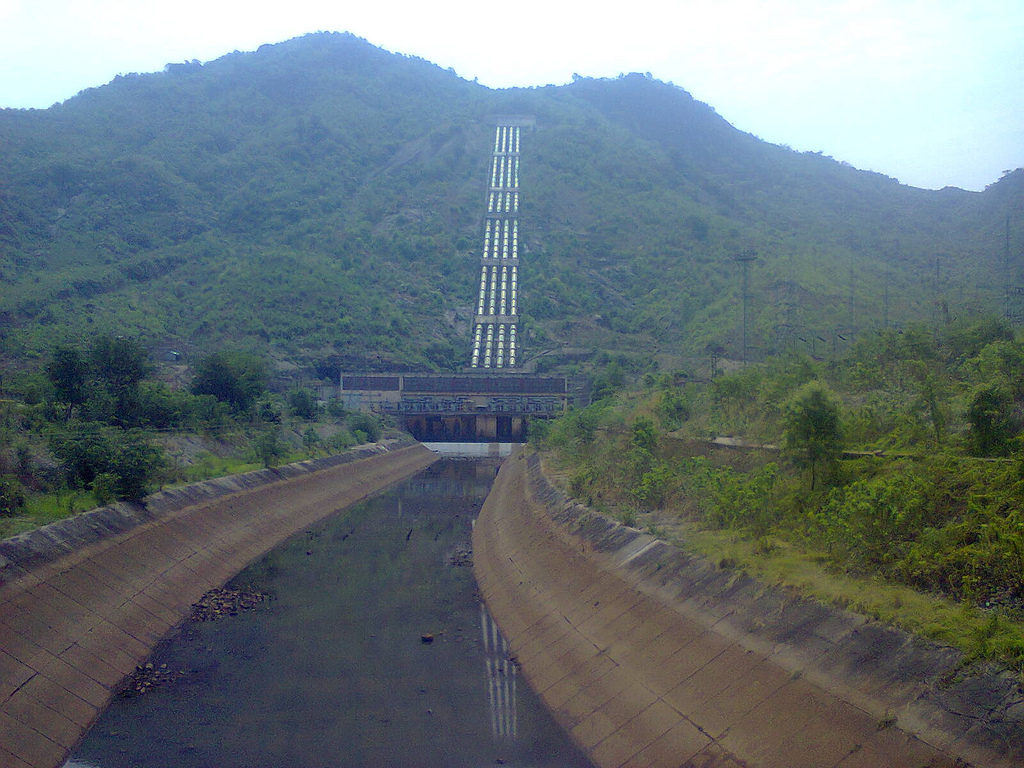
Upper Indravati power house

India's economically exploitable and viable hydroelectric potential is estimated to be 148,701 MW. An additional 6,780 MW from smaller hydro schemes (with capacities of less than 25 MW) is estimated as exploitable. 56 sites for pumped storage schemes with an aggregate installed capacity of 94,000 MW have also been identified. In central India, the hydroelectric power potential from the Godavari, Mahanadi, Nagavali, Vamsadhara and Narmada river basins has not been developed on a major scale due to potential opposition from the tribal population.

== Basin-wise potential of Hydropower ==
Brahmaputra has highest potential in terms of generating Hydroelectricity followed by Indus, Ganga. East-flowing rivers have the largest potential as compared to West-flowing rivers and Central-Indian basins.

The public sector accounts for 92.5% of India's hydroelectric power production. The National Hydroelectric Power Corporation (NHPC), Northeast Electric Power Company (NEEPCO), Satluj Jal Vidyut Nigam (SJVNL), THDC, and NTPC-Hydro are some of the public sector companies producing hydroelectric power in India. The private sector is also expected to grow with the development of hydroelectric energy in the Himalayan mountain ranges and in the northeast of India. Indian companies have also constructed hydropower projects in Bhutan, Nepal, Afghanistan, and other countries.

Bhakra Beas Management Board (BBMB), a state-owned enterprise in north India, has an installed capacity of 2.9 GW. The generation cost after four decades of operation is about 27 paise (0.32¢ US) per kWh. BBMB is a major source of peaking power and black start capability to the northern grid in India and its large reservoirs provide wide operational flexibility. BBMB reservoirs also supply water for the irrigation of 12.5 million acres (51,000 km^{2}; 19,500 sq mi) of agricultural land in partner states, enabling the green revolution in the northern India.

The International Hydropower Association estimates that the total hydropower potential in India is 660,000 GWh/year, of which 540,000 GWh/year (79%) is still undeveloped. India ranks as the fourth country in the world by undeveloped hydropower potential, after Russia, China and Canada, and fifth by total potential, surpassed also by Brazil.

== Pumped storage units ==
India has transformed from an electricity deficit state to an electricity surplus state. Peak load shortages can be met making use of pumped storage schemes which store surplus power to meet peak load demands. The pumped storage schemes also contribute secondary, seasonal power at no additional cost when rivers are flooded with excess water. India has already established nearly 4,800 MW pumped storage capacity with the installation of hydropower plants. Another 2780 MW capacity is under construction as of December 2023.

In a tropical country like India, abundant water for agriculture is needed due to a very high annual evaporation rate. Pumped storage units can also be used as pumping stations to supply river water for upland irrigation, industrial needs, and drinking water. The amount of water necessary to meet this demand can be harnessed from India's rivers via pumped storage units. Food security in India is improved with water security which in turn is possible from the energy security to supply the power needed for the pumped storage schemes. The Gujarat state's Canal Solar Power Project uses solar panels to both produce electricity and to prevent evaporation from water canals.

More and more solar power generation is becoming available at cheaper cost and it has advantage in terms of environmental impact. Solar power can meet daytime and night time energy demands with the help of pumped storage units.

Many of the existing hydro power stations on the west-flowing rivers located in the Western Ghats of Kerala and Karnataka are to be expanded to include pumped storage units in an effort to solve the water deficit of east-flowing rivers like the Kaveri, the Krishna, etc.

== See also ==
- List of hydro power stations in India
- Electricity sector in India
- Energy policy of India
- Pollution of the Ganges
- Water resources in India
- Indian Rivers Inter-link
- Wind power in India
- Solar power in India
- Biofuel in India
- Power sector of Andhra Pradesh
- Renewable energy in India
- Yarlung Tsangpo Hydroelectric Project
