= Suzlon =

Indian wind turbine company

Coordinates: 18.51186°N 73.935655°E

Suzlon Energy

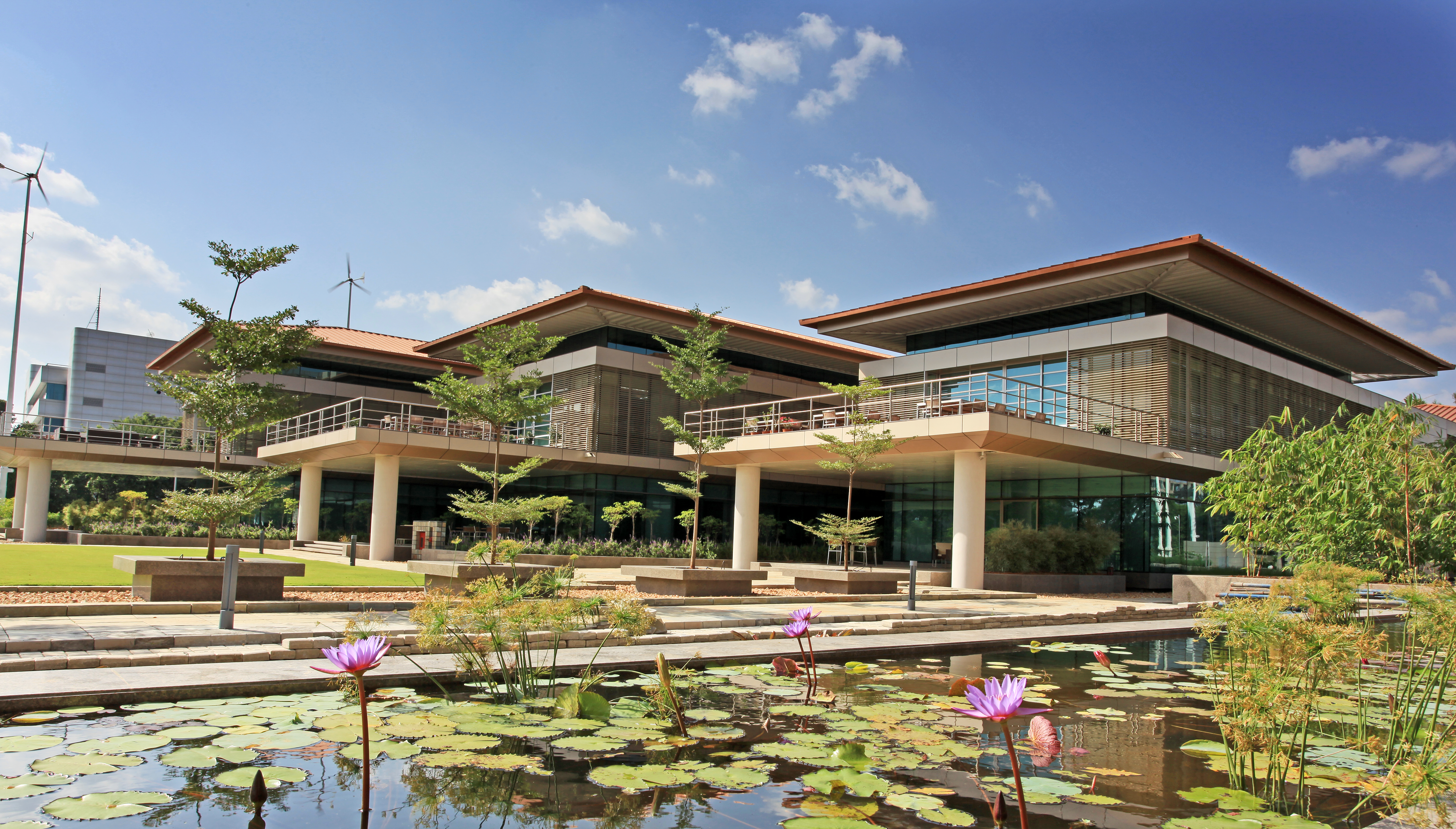
- Headquarters in Pune
- Type: Public
- Traded as: BSE: 532667; NSE: SUZLON
- ISIN: INE040H01021
- Industry: Renewable energy
- Founded: 1995; 31 years ago
- Founder: Tulsi Tanti
- Headquarters: One Earth, Hadapsar, Pune, Maharashtra, India
- Area served: Worldwide
- Key people: Mr. Girish Tanti (Co-Founder and Vice Chairman, Suzlon Group); Mr. Ajay Kapur (Chief Executive Officer, Suzlon Group); Mr. Rahul Jain (Chief Financial Officer, Suzlon Group)
- Products: Wind turbinesRenewable energy
- Revenue: ▲₹10,890 crore (US$1.1 billion) (2025)
- Operating income: ▲₹1,447 crore (US$150 million) (2025)
- Net income: ▲₹2,072 crore (US$220 million) (2025)
- Total assets: ▲₹12,943 crore (US$1.3 billion) (2025)
- Total equity: ▲₹6,106 crore (US$630 million) (2025)
- Owner: Tanti Family
- Number of employees: 8,500 (2026)
- Subsidiaries: SE Forge
- Website: www.suzlon.com

Suzlon Energy is an Indian multinational wind turbine manufacturer headquartered in Pune, Western India.

== History ==
Tulsi Tanti was a Gujarati businessman managing a small textile company. Due to the erratic availability of local power and its rising cost, the highest business expenditure after the raw materials was electricity. Tanti ventured into wind energy production as a way to secure the energy needs for his textile company. After commissioning two wind turbines, Tanti discovered that wind energy was an even better business than textiles and founded Suzlon Energy. It set up its first manufacturing facility at Diu. In 1996, Suzlon commissioned its first customer wind turbine for Indian Petrochemicals Corporation Limited at Dhank, Gujarat. The wind farm has powered 70,000 households in Gujarat completing over 25 years of operations.

Suzlon's technology partner for these earliest projects was German Südwind. In 2000, Suzlon got an order from Tata Finance and its wholly owned subsidiary, Niskalp Investment & Trading, to supply wind turbines for a 60 MW wind power project. It setup India's first 1 MW unit at Supa, Ahmednagar in Maharashtra under the order. Suzlon produced first-ever "made-in-India" wind turbine blades, S60, manufactured at its rotor blade unit in Daman in 2002

Suzlon adopted a business model wherein clients would be responsible for 25% of the up-front capital investment and Suzlon would arrange the remaining 75% on loan. Initially, Indian banks were hesitant to fund loans for this model, but by 2008, many Indian banks started financing wind power projects for Suzlon's clients.

In 2001, Tanti sold off the textile business and took over as chairman of Suzlon Group. In 2003, Suzlon ventured into international markets with an order from DanMar to supply 24 turbines in southwestern Minnesota, United States and set up an office in Beijing, China. Suzlon Rotor Corporation began producing the blades in Pipestone, Minnesota in 2006. Suzlon reached a definitive agreement for acquisition of Belgian firm Hansen Transmissions, specializing in gearboxes for wind turbines, for $565 million in 2006 and purchased a controlling stake in Germany's Senvion valued at US$1.6 billion in 2007. In June 2007, Suzlon had signed a contract with Edison Mission Energy (EME) of the United States for delivery of 150 wind turbines.

In November 2009, the company decided to sell 35% stake of Hansen for $370 million as part of its debt restructuring program and appointed Bank of America, Merrill Lynch and Morgan Stanley as the managers and book runners. In January 2011, Suzlon received an order worth US$1.28 billion for building 1000 megawatts of wind energy projects from Caparo Energy. In May 2011, Suzlon announced returning to profitability for the first time after the 2008 financial crisis.

In October 2011, Suzlon sold its remaining 26.06% stake in Hansen Transmissions to ZF Friedrichshafen AG for ₹8.9 billion (US$92 million). In the same month, it also achieved full control of its German subsidiary REpower Systems (now Senvion) by acquiring the remaining 5% stake held by minority shareholders for EUR 63 million. In line with the previously announced strategy to dispose of non-critical group assets to reduce long-term debt, Suzlon announced its intention to sell stake in its China manufacturing unit to China Power New Energy Development Company Limited for ₹3.4 billion (US$35 million). In November 2013, Senvion won an Engineering, Procurement and Construction (EPC) contract from Mitsui Australia to deliver 52 wind turbines for the Bald Hills Wind Farm in Victoria, Australia.

As of August 2014, Suzlon's debt increased to ₹8,000 crore (US$830 million). On 22 January 2015, Suzlon announced the sale of Senvion, its wholly owned subsidiary, to Centerbridge Partners, a private equity firm in a deal valued at ₹7,200 crore (US$750 million) to reduce the debts. In a further equity infusion, Dilip Shanghvi, the founder of Sun Pharmaceuticals, agreed to purchase a 23 percent stake in Suzlon for a sum of ₹1,800 crore (US$190 million). The deal shrank Tanti's holding to 24 percent, but management control remained with the Tanti family. Its total borrowings stood at ₹11,430.76 (US$120) in FY15-16 from ₹17,810.96 crore (US$1.8 billion) in FY14-15.

In May 2024, Suzlon secured new orders from Juniper Green Energy to develop 402 MW wind energy projects in Fatehgarh, Rajasthan. The deal includes installation of 134 wind turbine generators, each with a rated capacity of 3 MW.

On 9 August 2024, the market capitalization of Suzlon hits the mark of 1 lakh crore (approximately US$11.6 billion).

== Wind parks and facilities ==
As of 2015, Suzlon had installed over 17,000 MW of wind power capacity in 18 countries. In 2016, the company had fifteen manufacturing facilities and a workforce of over 8,000 employees globally. On 17 January 2017, Suzlon Energy achieved 10,000 megawatts installed wind energy milestone in India. Its notable installations in India include Jaisalmer Wind Park in Rajasthan (1064 MW), Kutch in Gujarat (1100 MW), Sakri in Maharashtra (650 MW), Eastern Ghats in Tamil Nadu (584 MW), and Satara in Maharashtra (210 MW).

== See also ==
- List of wind turbine manufacturers
- List of renewable energy companies by country
- Wind power in India
