= Wind power in India =

Wind power generation capacity in India has significantly increased in recent years. As of 31 March 2026, the total installed wind power capacity was 56.00 gigawatts (GW). India has the fourth largest installed wind power capacity in the world. Wind power capacity is mainly spread across the southern, western, and northwestern states. The onshore wind power potential of India was assessed at 132 GW with minimum 32% CUF at 120 m above the local ground level (agl). Whereas, the estimated potential at minimum 25% CUF is 695 GW at 120 agl.

Wind power costs in India are decreasing rapidly. The levelised tariff of wind power reached a record low of ₹2.43 (2.5¢ US) per kWh (without any direct or indirect subsidies) during auctions for wind projects in December 2017. However, the levelised tariff increased to ₹3.17 (3.3¢ US) per kWh in May 2023. In December 2017, union government announced the applicable guidelines for tariff-based wind power auctions to bring more clarity and minimise the risk to the developers. Wind power installations occupy only 2% of the wind farm area facilitating rest of the area for agriculture, plantations, etc. Wind power plants are also capable to provide fast frequency response in ramping up falling grid frequency.

== Installed capacity ==
The table below shows India's year on year installed wind power, annual wind power generation and annual growth in wind power generation since 2006. Wind power generation in India ranks fourth globally in 2024.

Installed wind power capacity and generation in India since 2006
Financial year	6-07	7-08	8-09	09-10	10–11	11–12	12–13	13–14	14–15	15–16	16–17	17–18	18–19	19–20	20–21	21–22	22-23	23-24	24-25
Installed capacity (MW)	7,850	9,587	10,925	13,064	16,084	18,421	20,150	22,465	23,447	26,777	32,280	34,046	35,626	37,669	38,785	40,355	42,633	45,887	50,017
Generation (GWh)									28,214	28,604	46,011	52,666	62,036	64,485	59,824	68,640	71,814	83,385	80.27

== History ==
Installed wind power capacity
Fiscal year,	cumulative capacity (MW)
2005	6,270
2010	16,084
2014	23,354
2015	26,769
2016	32,280
2017	34,046
2018	35,626
2019	37,669
2020	38,785
2021	40,355
2022	42,633
2023	45,887
2024	50,017
2025	56,095

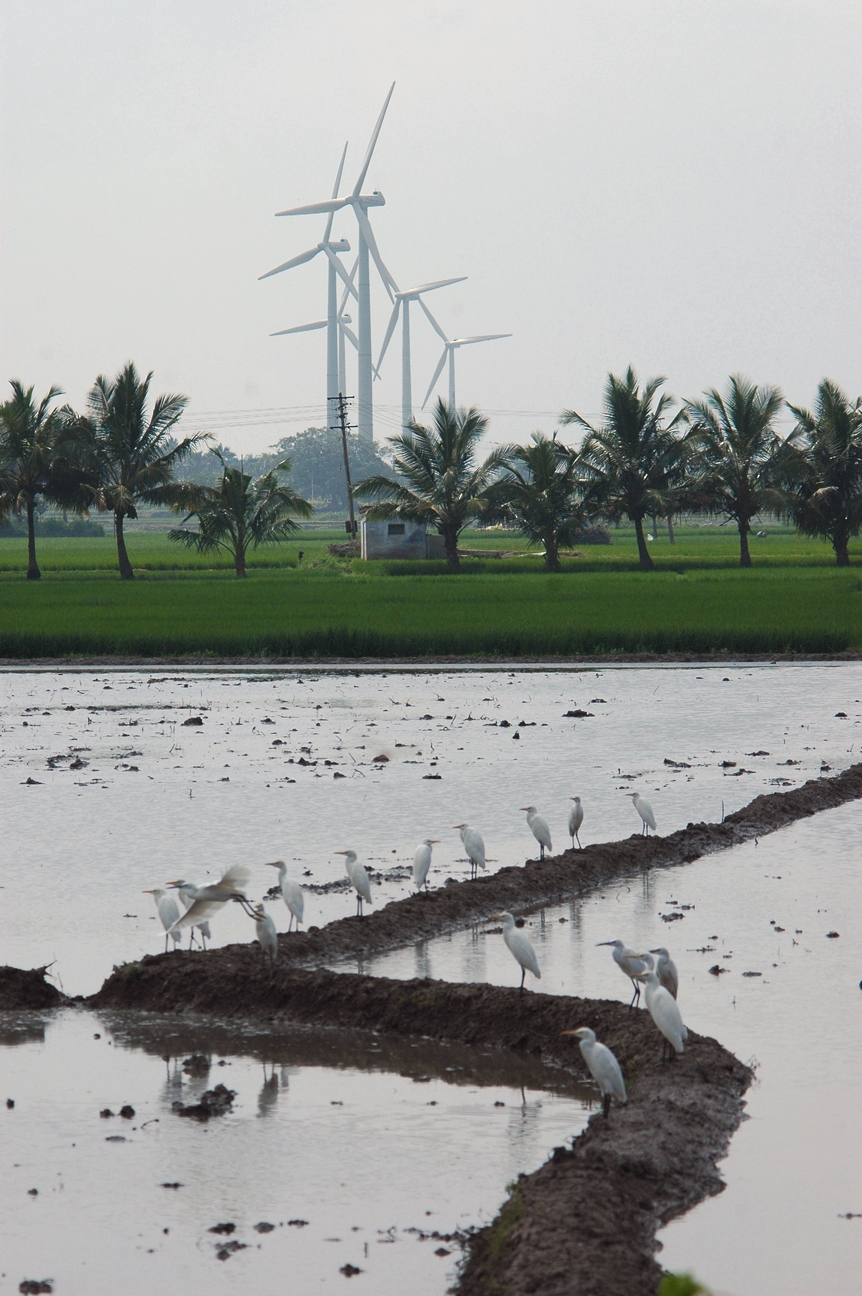
Wind farms in paddy fields in India

Development of wind power in India began in December 1952, when Maneklal Sankalchand Thacker, a distinguished power engineer, initiated a project with the Indian Council of Scientific and Industrial Research (CSIR) to explore the possibilities of harnessing wind power in the country. The CSIR established a Wind Power Sub-Committee under P. Nilakantan, which was assigned the task of investigating the available resources that could be practically utilised, along with researching the economic possibilities of wind energy. With assistance from the Indian Meteorological Department, the Sub-Committee extensively reviewed available data on surface winds in India and their velocity duration, and began detailed surveys of promising sites for harnessing the optimum amount of wind energy; it also successfully developed and tested large wood-and-bamboo windmills.

In September 1954, a Symposium on Solar Energy and Wind Power organised by the CSIR and UNESCO was held in New Delhi; among the attendees was E. W. Golding, a British power engineer and authority on wind energy generation. Convinced of the potential of wind power in India, he recommended continued and extensive wind velocity surveys in different regions of India, the full-time assignment of staff to experimental wind power studies, the establishment of a dedicated research laboratory and development of small to medium-sized wind-powered electrical generators. Golding's recommendations were adopted by the CSIR in 1957. By this time, regions of Saurashtra and around Coimbatore had been identified as promising sites for generating electricity from wind power, and the Wind Power Sub-Committee had begun to erect 20 wind velocity survey stations across India, in addition to testing its indigenously designed windmills and obtaining a 6 kW. Allgaier wind turbine, which was presented to India by the West German government; experiments at Porbandar with the latter had commenced by 1961. The Indian government also considered a proposal to erect over 20,000 small to medium-sized wind-powered electrical generators in rural districts, to be used for powering water pumps and supplying electricity for remotely situated structures such as lighthouses.

In 1960, the CSIR established a Wind Power Division as part of the new National Aeronautical Laboratory (NAL) in Bangalore, which was founded that year. From the 1960s into the 1980s, the NAL and other groups continued to carry out wind velocity surveys and develop improved estimates of India's wind energy capacity. Large-scale development of wind power began in 1985 with the first wind project in Veraval, Gujarat, in the form of a 40-kW Dutch machine (made by Polenko) connected to the grid. The project, an initiative of late Dr. K S Rao, then-Director of Gujarat Energy Development Agency (GEDA), was a joint venture between GEDA and J K Synthetics Ltd. Though the performance of this machine was quite poor, it established the technical viability of operating wind turbines in the grid-connected mode in India. Subsequently, the Government of India planned several demonstration wind farms in the coastal regions of the country and simultaneously launched a massive programme to identify sites suitable for wind projects. In 1986, demonstration wind farms were set up in the coastal areas of Maharashtra (Ratnagiri), Gujarat (Okha) and Tamil Nadu (Tirunelveli) with 55 kW Vestas wind turbines. These demonstration projects were supported by the Ministry of New and Renewable Energy (MNRE). The demonstration projects set up in 1985–86 established beyond doubt, both the technical and economic viability of the wind energy projects, while the wind-mapping programme resulted in the identification of many sites suitable for wind power projects (C-WET 2001; Mani 1990, 1992, 1994; Mani and Mooley 1983).

The potential for wind farms in the country was first assessed in 2011 to be more than 2,000 GW by Prof. Jami Hossain of TERI University, New Delhi. This was subsequently re-validated by Lawrence Berkeley National Laboratory, US (LBNL) in an independent study in 2012. As a result, the Ministry of New and Renewable Energy (MNRE) set up a committee to reassess the potential and through the National Institute of Wind Energy (NIWE, previously C-WET) has announced a revised estimation of the potential wind resource in India from 49,130 MW to 302,000 MW assessed at 100 metres (330 ft) hub height.

In 2015, the MNRE set the target for Wind Power generation capacity by 2022 at 60,000 MW.

No offshore wind farm was under implementation as of December 2017. However, an Offshore Wind Policy was announced in 2015 and, as of 2017, weather stations and Lidars were being set up by NIWE at some locations. As of 2018, the first offshore wind farm was planned near Dhanushkodi in Tamil Nadu.

== Electricity generation ==
Wind power accounts for nearly 10% of India's total installed utility power generation capacity and generated 80.27 TWh in the fiscal year 2024–25, which is nearly 4.43% of total electricity generation. The capacity utilization factor is nearly 18% in the fiscal year 2022–23 (19.33% in 2018–19, 16% in 2017–18, 19.62% in 2016–17 and 14% in 2015–16). 70% of annual wind generation is during the five months duration from May to September coinciding with Southwest monsoon duration. In India, solar power is complementary to wind power as it is generated mostly during the non-monsoon period in the daytime. Nearly 60% of the wind power is generated during the night time which is equal to the stored solar power in terms of pricing. All time maximum wind power generation was 28,974 MW as of 26 January 2025.

Monthly electricity generation, April 2022 – March 2023
Month	North	West	South	East	North East	Total (GWh)
April 2022	467.46	2,513.64	1,145.12	0	0	4,126.22
May 2022	1,092.60	4,619.10	4,462.57	0	0	10,174.27
June 2022	1,092.44	3,635.86	4,980.22	0	0	9,708.52
July 2022	532.70	3,942.27	5,791.47	0	0	10,266.44
August 2022	548.23	3,163.02	4,983.71	0	0	8,694.96
September 2022	488.82	2,146.59	4,019.08	0	0	6,654.49
October 2022	243.51	1,531.83	1,646.46	0	0	3,421.80
November 2022	248.47	1,197.48	1,043.55	0	0	2,489.50
December 2022	281.01	2,133.49	1,581.65	0	0	3,996.15
January 2023	471.84	2,733.68	1,808.23	0	0	5,013.74
February 2023	274.53	1,434.89	1,417.57	0	0	3,126.99
March 2023	369.80	1,884.13	1,887.13	0	0	4,141.07
Total (GWh)	6,111.41	30,935.99	34,766.76	0	0	71,814.16

== Wind power by state ==
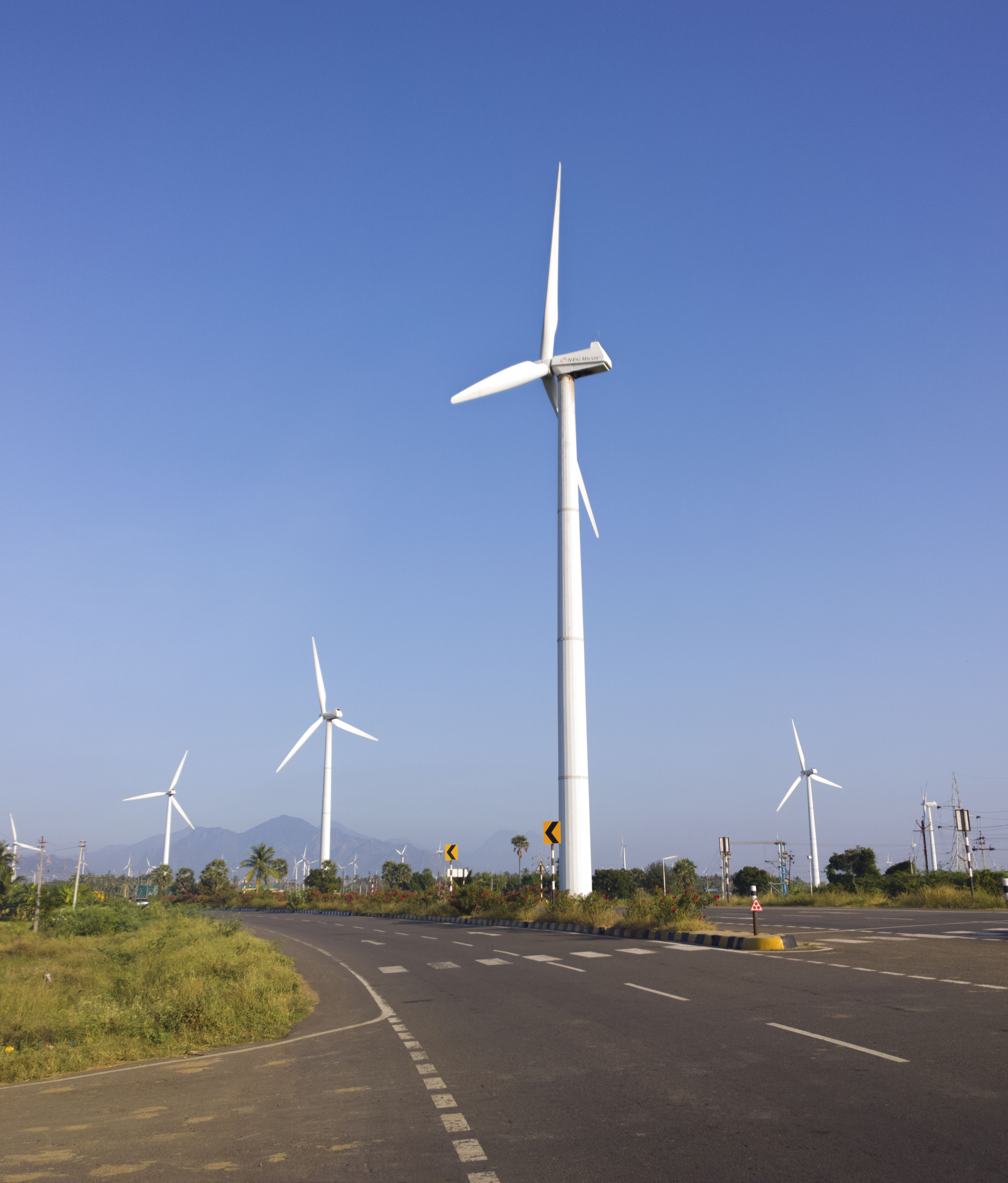
Muppandal Wind Farm in Tamil Nadu

There are a growing number of wind energy installations in states across India. Gujarat has the highest installed wind power capacity in the country, followed by Tamil Nadu. These two states account for around half of India's installed wind capacity.

Installed wind capacity by state as of 28 February 2026
State	Total capacity (MW)	Share
Gujarat	15,197.19	27.56%
Tamil Nadu	12,102.76	21.95%
Karnataka	8,500.54	15.42%
Maharashtra	5,873.01	10.65%
Rajasthan	5,229.15	9.49%
Andhra Pradesh	4,415.78	8.01%
Madhya Pradesh	3,610.15	6.55%
Telangana	128.10	0.23%
Kerala	71.52	0.13%
Others	4.30	0.01%
Total	55,132.50	100%

=== Gujarat ===
Gujarat government's focus on tapping renewable energy has led to a sharp rise in the wind power capacity in the last few years. According to official data, wind power generation capacity in the state has increased a staggering ten times in the last six years. Gujarat has the highest share (around 27.6%) of the total installed wind power capacity of the country, accounting for 12.5 GW out of 48.16 GW. Renewable energy projects worth a massive Rs 1 trillion (short scale) of memorandums of understanding (MoUs) in the Vibrant Gujarat Summit in 2017. The single largest wind turbine of 5.2 MW capacity at 120 metres (390 ft) hub height was installed in the state as of November 2022. The tallest wind turbine (3 MW) is located at Gondal in Gujarat with 160 m hub height. In July 2023 a 70 MW capacity wind-solar park was commissioned by Fourth Partner Energy.

Tamil Nadu's total wind capacity was 9608 MW by the end of March 2021, while Gujarat's capacity was approximately 1,000 MW lower, at 8562 MW. However, by the end of January 2023, Gujarat's total wind power capacity had risen to 9,919 MW, while Tamil Nadu's capacity was only 9964 MW. By mid-2023, Gujarat had surpassed Tamil Nadu in installed capacity. As of February 2026, Gujarat is more than 3000 MW ahead of Tamil Nadu in installed wind capacity.

=== Tamil Nadu ===
Tamil Nadu's wind capacity was second highest (around 22% share) after Gujarat as of 28 February 2026. The Government of Tamil Nadu realized the importance and need for renewable energy, and set up a separate Agency, as a registered society, called the Tamil Nadu Energy Development Agency (TEDA) as early as 1985. Tamil Nadu was the leader in Wind Power in India, before being surpassed by Gujarat in 2023. The largest capacity wind turbine of 4.2 MW was installed in Tamil Nadu state as of October 2022, before it was surpassed by a wind turbine of 5.2 MW capacity at 120 meters hub height installed in Mundra, Gujarat, in November 2022. In Muppandal windfarm, the total capacity is 1500 MW with nearly 3000 wind turbines, the largest wind power plant in India. The total wind installed capacity in Tamil Nadu is 12,102.76 MW, around 3 GW lower than Gujarat.

=== Madhya Pradesh ===
In consideration of a unique concept, the government of Madhya Pradesh sanctioned another 15 MW project to Madhya Pradesh Windfarms at Nagda Hills near Dewas under consultation from Consolidated Energy Consultants. All 25 WEGs were commissioned on 31 March 2008.

=== Odisha ===
Odisha, a coastal state, has a higher potential for wind energy. As of 2012, the installed capacity was 2.0 MW. Odisha has a wind power potential of 1700MW. The government of Odisha is actively pursuing to boost Wind power generation. However, it has not progressed like other states primarily because Odisha has a power surplus due to huge coal reserves and a number of existing and upcoming thermal power plants.

=== Ladakh ===
The union territory of Ladakh and its Kargil district are potential wind energy areas which, as of 2015, had yet to be exploited.

== Repowering wind power projects ==
The union government has released a policy for the repowering of wind power projects which states that the repowering potential is nearly 25,406 MW. The policy includes the installation of additional wind turbines, of minimum 3 MW capacity each with hub heights above 120 meters, located in between the existing wind turbines in place of few existing turbines without any effect on one another's performance. Increasing the hub height also enhances the average wind speed captured by the turbine, thanks to the wind profile power law. Spacing between wind turbines in a wind farm can be optimized by yaw control minimizing the wake effect to enhance the capacity density (MW per square km). With the advent of towers made of wood up to 100 meters tall, the top half of the tower can be of lightweight wood structure to locate wind turbines above 200 m height.

Additional electricity can be produced by covering the south-facing façade area of the wind turbine towers/masts with solar panels up to the rotor bottom tip height at an economical price.

== Offshore wind power plants ==
India has an offshore wind energy potential of around 70 GW in parts along the coast of Gujarat and Tamil Nadu. As of May 2022, there is no offshore wind project under construction or operation. India has announced tentative schedule for calling request for quotation (RfQ) to establish off shore wind power projects.

India started planning in 2010 to enter into offshore wind power, and a 100 MW demonstration plant located off the Gujarat coast began planning in 2014. In 2013, a consortium (instead of a group of organisations), led by Global Wind Energy Council (GWEC) started project FOWIND (Facilitating Offshore Wind in India) to identify potential zones for development of offshore wind power in India and to stimulate R & D activities in this area. The other consortium partners include the Centre for Study of Science, Technology and Policy (CSTEP), DNV GL, the Gujarat Power Corporation Limited (GPCL) and the World Institute of Sustainable Energy (WISE). The consortium was awarded a grant of €4.0 million by the delegation of the European Union to India in 2013 besides co-funding support from GPCL. The project activities will be implemented from December 2013 to March 2018.

The project focuses on the States of Gujarat and Tamil Nadu for the identification of potential zones for development through techno-commercial analysis and preliminary resource assessment. It will also establish a platform for structural collaboration and knowledge sharing between stakeholders from European Union and India, on offshore wind technology, policy, regulation, industry, and human resource development. FOWIND activities will also help facilitate a platform to stimulate offshore wind-related R&D activities in the country. The consortium published initial pre-feasibility assessment reports for offshore wind farm development in Gujarat and Tamil Nadu on 16 June 2015. In September 2015, India's cabinet has approved the National Offshore Wind Energy Policy. With this, the Ministry of New & Renewable Energy (MNRE) has been authorised as the Nodal Ministry for use of offshore areas within the Exclusive Economic Zone (EEZ).

India seems pacing up rapidly towards offshore wind energy development as the Nodal Ministry (MNRE) & Nodal Agency (NIWE) calls with the Expression of Interest (EoI) inviting the bidders for development of first 1000MW commercial-scale offshore wind farm in India, near the coast of Gujarat. The EoI published on 16 April 2018, specifies the proposed area identified under the FOWIND & FOWPI study funded by European Union. The proposed location of the offshore wind farm could be 23–40 km (14–25 mi) off the coast from the Pipavav port, Gulf of Khambhat. The proposed area covers about 400 km^{2} (150 sq mi). The wind measurements & other data collection are in progress under the supervision of NIWE.

A viability Gap Funding (VGF) scheme for offshore wind energy projects was approved by the Union Government in June 2024, for installation and commissioning of 1 GW of offshore wind energy projects (500 MW each off the coast of Gujarat and Tamil Nadu).

== Projects ==
India's largest wind power production facilities (20 MW and greater) include:

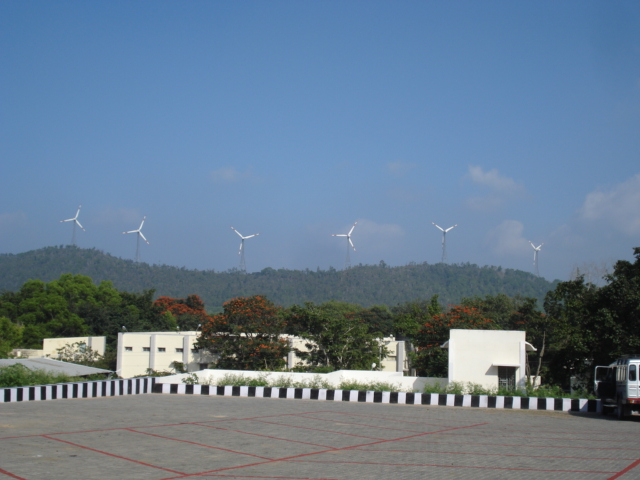
Windmills on the Tirumala hills in Andhra Pradesh

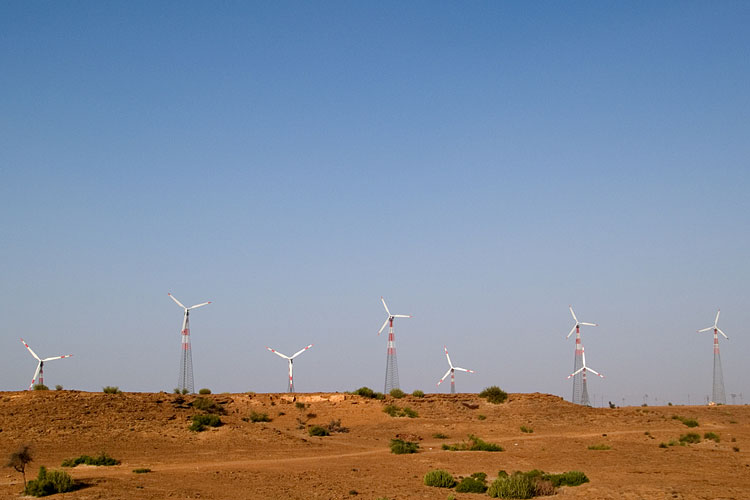
A wind farm in Rajasthan

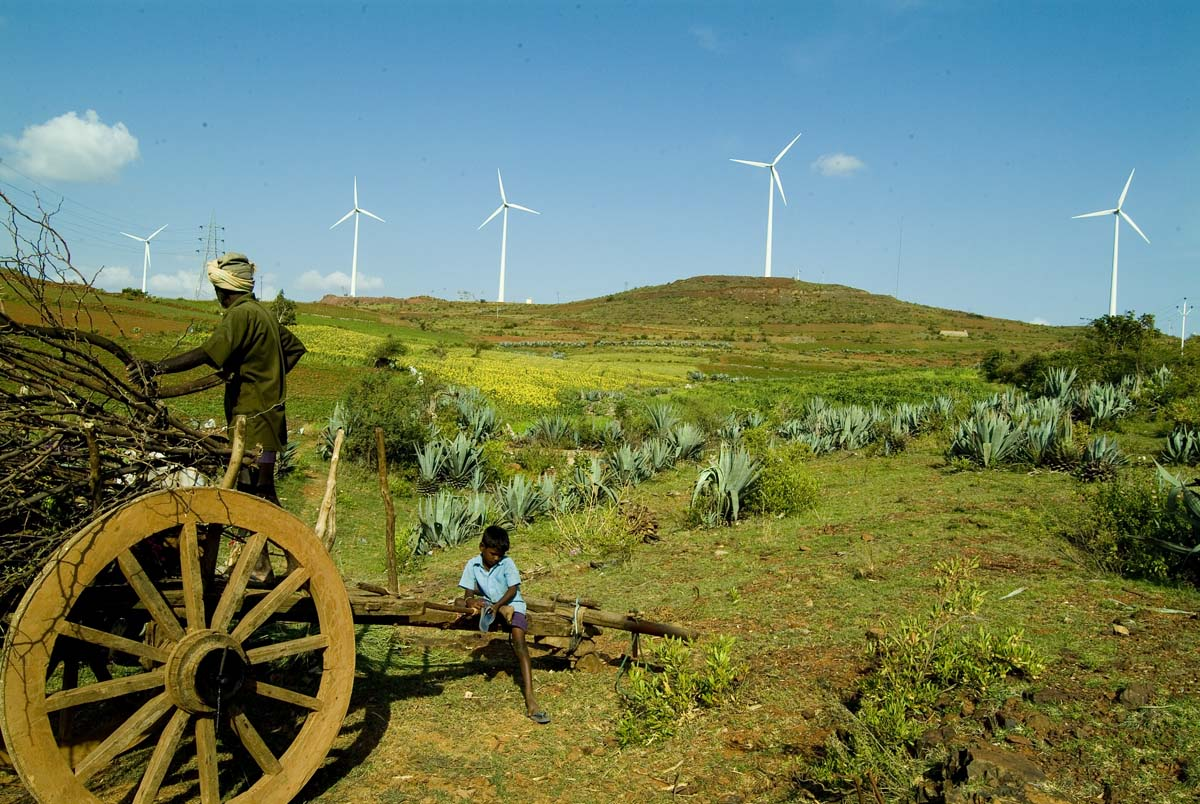
Wind turbines in India's agricultural farms

Power plant	Location	State	MWe	Producer	Ref
Kutch Wind Farm (Gujarat Hybrid Renewable Energy Park)	Kutch	Gujarat	11,500 (wind) + 11,500 (solar + wind)	Adani Group Suzlon	
Muppandal Wind Farm	Kanyakumari	Tamil Nadu	1500	Muppandal Wind	
Jaisalmer Wind Park	Jaisalmer	Rajasthan	1064	Suzlon Energy	
Brahmanvel windfarm	Dhule	Maharashtra	528	Parakh Agro Industries	
Sidhpur-2	Dwarka	Gujarat	250.8	KP Energy	
Kayathar	Thoothukudi	Tamilnadu	300	Siemens Gamesa, ReNew Power	
Dhalgaon windfarm	Sangli	Maharashtra	278	Gadre Marine Exports	
Vankusawade Wind Park	Satara district	Maharashtra	259	Suzlon Energy Ltd.	
Vaspet	Vaspet	Maharashtra	144	ReNew Power	
Tuljapur	Osmanabad	Maharashtra	126	Siemens Gamesa, ReNew Power	
Sipla	Jaisalmer	Rajasthan	102	CLP Wind Farms (India) Private Ltd	
Saeame	Jamnagar	Gujarat	101	CLP Wind Farms (India) Private Ltd	
Beluguppa Wind Park	Beluguppa	Andhra Pradesh	100.8	Orange Renewable	
Mamatkheda Wind Park	Mamatkheda	Madhya Pradesh	100.5	Orange Renewable	
Anantapur Wind Park	Nimbagallu	Andhra Pradesh	100	Orange Renewable	
Damanjodi Wind Power Plant	Damanjodi	Odisha	99	Suzlon Energy Ltd	
Theni		Tamil Nadu	99	CLP Wind Farms (India) Private Ltd	
Saundatti	Belgaum	Karnataka	84	CLP Wind Farms (India) Private Ltd	
Jath	Jath	Maharashtra	84	ReNew Power	
Welturi	Welturi	Maharashtra	75	ReNew Power	
Kuchhdi	Porbandar	Gujarat	69	KP Energy	
Mahuva-1	Mahuva	Gujarat	67.8	KP Energy	
Acciona Tuppadahalli	Chitradurga District	Karnataka	56.1	Tuppadahalli Energy India Pvt Ltd	
Dangiri Wind Farm	Jaiselmer	Rajasthan	54	Oil India	
Nuziveedu Seeds	Bhimasamudra	Karnataka	50.4	NSL Renewable Power Pvt Ltd	
Bhungar	Mahuva	Gujarat	50 (wind) + 35 (solar)	KP Energy	
Khandke	Ahmednagar	Maharashtra	50	CLP Wind Farms (India) Private Ltd	
Narmada	Nallakonda	Andhra Pradesh	50	CLP Wind Farms (India) Private Ltd	
Bercha Wind Park	Ratlam	Madhya Pradesh	50	Orange Renewable	
Harapanahalli	Davanagere	Karnataka	40	CLP Wind Farms (India) Private Ltd	
Matalpar	Mahuva	Gujarat	33.6	KP Energy	
Ratadi	Porbandar	Gujarat	33.6	KP Energy	
Cape Comorin	Kanyakumari	Tamil Nadu	33	Aban Offshore	
Kayathar Subhash	Kayathar	Tamil Nadu	30	Subhash Ltd	
Dedan	Rajula	Gujarat	30	IB Vogt Solar India Pvt Ltd	
Vagra	Bharuch	Gujarat	25.8	KP Energy	
Fulsar	Mahuva	Gujarat	23.1	KP Energy	
Jasdan	Jasdan	Gujarat	25.0	NTPC Limited	
Ramakkalmedu	Ramakkalmedu	Kerala	25	Subhash Ltd	
Gudimangalam	Gudimangalam	Tamil Nadu	21	Gudimangalam Wind Farm	
Shalivahana Wind	Tirupur	Tamil Nadu	20.4	Shalivahana Green Energy Ltd	
Puthlur RCI	Puthlur	Andhra Pradesh	20	Wescare (India) Ltd	
Kora	Bharuch	Gujarat	13	KPI Green Energy	

== See also ==
- Renewable energy in India
- Electricity sector in India
- Energy policy of India
- Solar power in India
- List of onshore wind farms
- Wind turbine design
- Floating wind turbine
- Hydroelectric power in India
- Biofuel in India
- Wind power by country
- Renewable energy by country
