= Vankusawade Wind Park =

Coordinates: 17°27′22″N 73°49′59″E

Vankusawade Wind Park is a wind farm located on a high mountain plateau at 1,150 m above the Koyana Reservoir, around 40 km from the town of Satara, Satara District in Maharashtra.

Wind power is generated from Suzlon S33/350 turbines of 350 kW each. resulting in a total power output of 210 MW.
