= Energy policy of India =

The energy policy of India is to increase the locally produced energy in India and reduce energy poverty, with more focus on developing alternative sources of energy, particularly nuclear, solar and wind energy. Net energy import dependency was 40.9% in 2021-22. The primary energy consumption in India grew by 13.3% in FY2022-23 and is the third biggest with a 6% global share after China and the US. The total primary energy consumption from coal (452.2 Mtoe; 45.88%), crude oil (239.1 Mtoe; 29.55%), natural gas (49.9 Mtoe; 6.17%), nuclear energy (8.8 Mtoe; 1.09%), hydroelectricity (31.6 Mtoe; 3.91%) and renewable power (27.5 Mtoe; 3.40%) is 809.2 Mtoe (excluding traditional biomass use) in the calendar year 2018. In 2018, India's net imports are nearly 205.3 million tons of crude oil and its products, 26.3 Mtoe of LNG and 141.7 Mtoe coal totaling to 373.3 Mtoe of primary energy which is equal to 46.13% of total primary energy consumption. India is largely dependent on fossil fuel imports to meet its energy demands – by 2030, India's dependence on energy imports is expected to exceed 53% of the country's total energy consumption.

India's energy policy increasingly emphasizes energy transition and decarbonization strategies, particularly in sectors such as transportation. According to a report by The Energy and Resources Institute (TERI), the country is focusing on electric mobility, alternative fuels, and policy-driven approaches to reduce carbon emissions and improve long-term energy sustainability.

About 80% of India's electricity generation is from fossil fuels. India is surplus in electricity generation and also a marginal exporter of electricity in 2017. Since the end of the calendar year 2015, huge power generation capacity has been idling for want of electricity demand. India ranks second after China in renewables production with 208.7 Mtoe in 2016. The carbon intensity in India was 0.29 kg of CO_{2} per kWh_{e} in 2016 which is more than that of USA, China and EU. The total manmade CO_{2} emissions from energy, process emissions, methane, and flaring is 2797.2 million tons of CO_{2} in CY2021, which was 7.2% of global emissions. The energy intensity of the agriculture sector was seven times less than that of the industrial sector in 2022–23.)

The per-capita primary energy consumption in 2025 was 30 GJ/capita.The per-capita primary energy consumption in 2050 and 2070 would be 54 and 56 GJ/capita respectively in a net zero scenario by 2070. In 2020-21, the per-capita energy consumption is 0.6557 Mtoe excluding traditional biomass use and the energy intensity of the Indian economy is 0.2233 Mega Joules per INR (53.4 kcal/INR). India attained 63% overall energy self-sufficiency in 2017. Due to rapid economic expansion, India has one of the world's fastest growing energy markets and is expected to be the second-largest contributor to the increase in global energy demand by 2035, accounting for 18% of the rise in global energy consumption. Given India's growing energy demands and limited domestic oil and gas reserves, the country has ambitious plans to expand its renewable and most worked out nuclear power programme. India has the world's fourth largest wind power market and also plans to add about 100,000 MW of solar power capacity by 2022. India also envisages to increase the contribution of nuclear power to overall electricity generation capacity from 4.2% to 9% within 25 years. The country has five nuclear reactors under construction (third highest in the world) and plans to construct 18 additional nuclear reactors (second highest in the world) by 2025. During the year 2018, the total investment in energy sector by India was 4.1% (US$75 billion) of US$1.85 trillion global investment.

The energy policy of India is characterized by trade-offs between four major drivers: A rapidly growing economy, with a need for dependable and reliable supply of electricity, gas, and petroleum products; Increasing household incomes, with a need for an affordable and adequate supply of electricity, and clean cooking fuels; limited domestic reserves of fossil fuels, and the need to import a vast fraction of the natural gas, and crude oil, and recently the need to import coal as well; and indoor, urban and regional environmental impacts, necessitating the need for the adoption of cleaner fuels and cleaner technologies. In recent years, these challenges have led to a major set of continuing reforms, restructuring, and a focus on energy conservation.

A report by The Energy and Resources Institute (TERI) outlines a roadmap for India's energy transition in the transport sector, emphasizing electric mobility, alternative fuels, and policy-driven decarbonization efforts.

India: Industry-wise total primary energy use of 87599 petajoules in 2019-20
1. Electricity, gas, steam & air conditioning supply (26.0%)
2. Transportation & storage (2.00%)
3. Other industries (19.0%)
4. Households (7.00%)
5. Accumulation (3.00%)
6. Export (6.00%)
7. Agriculture, forestry & fishery (2.00%)
8. Mining & quarrying (1.00%)
9. Manufacturing (34.0%)
India: Total primary energy supply of 882 Mtoe in 2017
1. Coal (44.3%)
2. Biomass and waste (21.2%)
3. Petroleum & oth. liquids (25.3%)
4. Natural gas (5.80%)
5. Nuclear (1.10%)
6. Hydroelectric (1.40%)
7. Other renewables (0.90%)

== Fossil fuels ==
=== Oil and gas ===
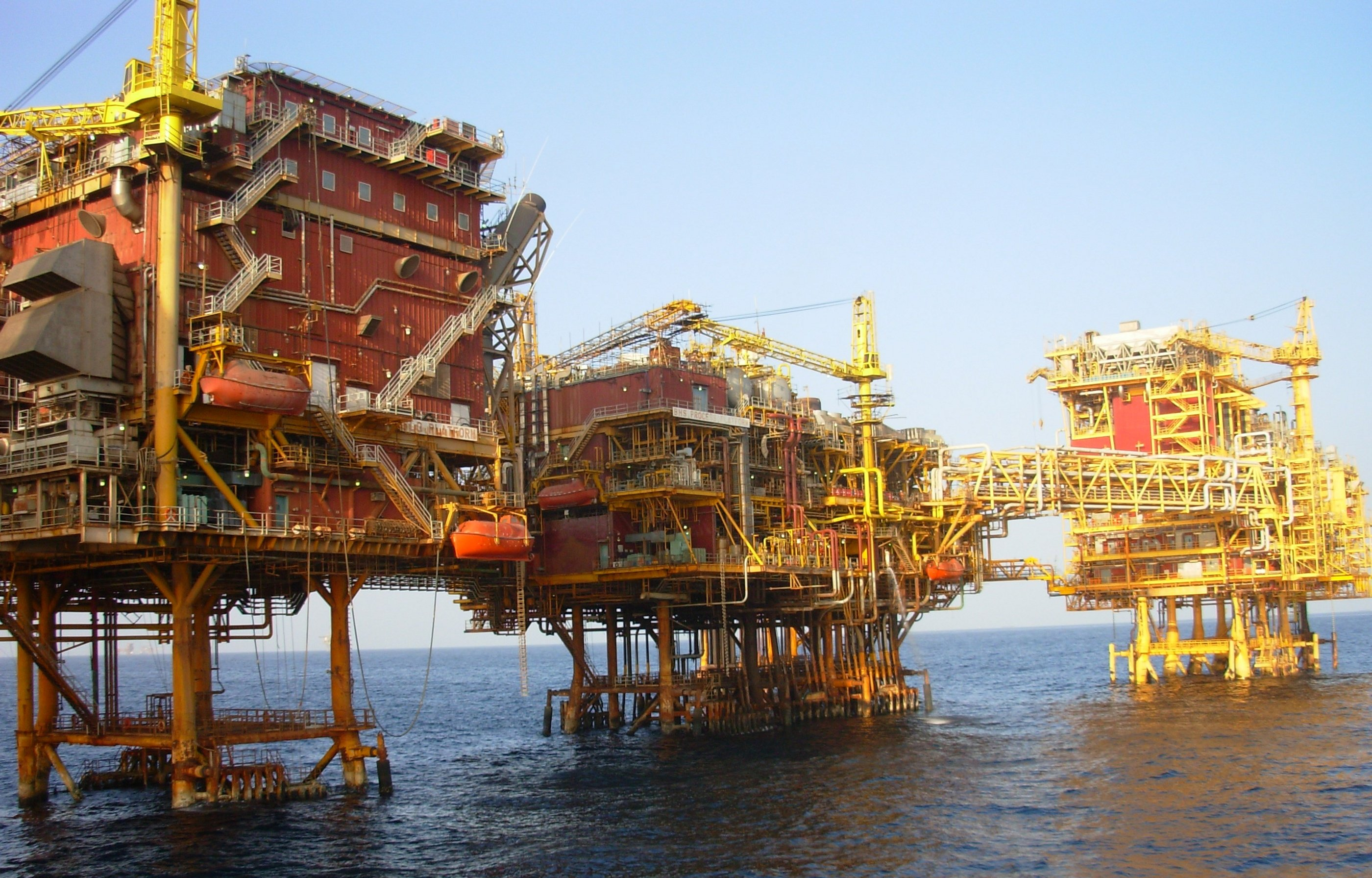
An ONGC platform at Bombay High in the Arabian Sea

India's oil deficit

Gas balance of India

India ranks third in oil consumption with 4.669 million barrels/day in 2020 after USA and China. During the calendar year 2019, India imported 221.7 million tons of crude oil and 44.4 million tons of refined petroleum products and exported 60.7 million tons of refined petroleum products. India is the second biggest net importer of crude oil and its products after China. India has built surplus world-class refining capacity using imported crude oil for exporting refined petroleum products. The net imports of crude oil is lesser by one fourth after accounting exports and imports of refined petroleum products. Natural gas production was 26.9 billion cubic meters and consumption 59.7 billion cubic meters during the calendar year 2019.

During the financial year 2012–13, the production of crude oil was 37.86 million tons and 40,679 million standard cubic meters (nearly 26.85 million tons) natural gas. The net import of crude oil and petroleum products is 146.70 million tons worth of Rs 5611.40 billion. This includes 9.534 million tons of LNG imports worth of Rs. 282.15 billion. Internationally, LNG price (one million Btu of LNG = 0.1724 barrels of crude oil (boe) = 29.52 cubic meters of natural gas = 21 kg of natural gas = 29.2 liters diesel = 21.3 kg LPG = 0.293 MWh) is fixed below crude oil price in terms of heating value. LNG is slowly gaining its role as direct use fuel in the road and marine transport without regasification. By the end of June 2016, LNG price has fallen by nearly 50% below its oil parity price making it more economical fuel than diesel/gas oil in transport sector. In 2012-13, India consumed 15.744 million tons petrol and 69.179 million tons diesel which are mainly produced from imported crude oil at huge foreign exchange out go. Using natural gas for heating, cooking and electricity generation is not economical as more and more locally produced natural gas will be converted into LNG for use in the transport sector to reduce crude oil imports. Conversion of old diesel fueled heavy duty vehicles into LNG vehicles would restore original performance economically. In addition to the conventional natural gas production, coal gasification, coal bed methane, coal mine methane and Biogas digesters / Renewable natural gas will also become a source of LNG forming decentralised base for the production of LNG to cater to the widely distributed demand. There is possibility to convert most of the heavy duty vehicles (including diesel driven rail engines) into LNG fuelled vehicles to reduce diesel consumption drastically with operational cost and least pollution benefits. Also, the break even price at user end for switching from imported coal to LNG in electricity generation is estimated near US$6 per million British thermal units ($20/MWh). The advent of cheaper marine CNG transport will restrict LNG use in high end transport sector to replace costly liquid fuels leaving imported CNG use for other needs. As the marine CNG transport is economical for medium distance transport and has fast unloading flexibility at many ports without costly unloading facilities, they have become alternate solution to submarine gas pipelines. Natural gas/methane can also be converted cheaply into hydrogen gas and carbon black without emitting any greenhouse gas for use in the transport sector with fuel cell vehicle technology.

The state-owned Oil and Natural Gas Corporation (ONGC) acquired shares in oil fields in countries like Sudan, Syria, Iran, and Nigeria – investments that have led to diplomatic tensions with the United States. Because of political instability in the Middle East and increasing domestic demand for energy, India is keen on decreasing its dependency on OPEC to meet its oil demand, and increasing its energy security. Several Indian oil companies, primarily led by ONGC and Reliance Industries, have started a massive hunt for oil in several regions in India, including Rajasthan, Krishna Godavari Basin and north-eastern Himalayas.

India has nearly 63 tcf technically recoverable resources of shale gas which can meet all its needs for twenty years if exploited. India is developing an offshore gas field in Mozambique. The proposed Iran-Pakistan-India pipeline is a part of India's plan to meet its increasing energy demand.

=== Coal ===
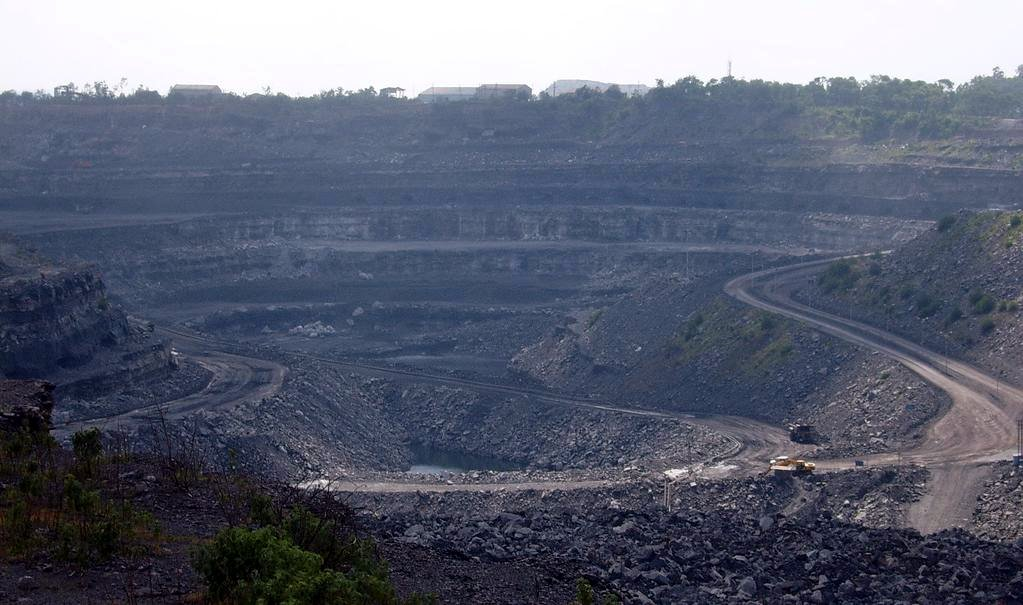
A coal mine in Jharkhand state

India has the world's 3rd largest proven coal reserves with nearly 177 billion metric tons as on 1 April 2021. In India, coal is the bulk primary energy contributor with 56.90% share equivalent to 452.2 Mtoe in 2018.

India is the second largest producer of coal in 2023. India is also the second-largest importer of coal 141.7 Mtoe in 2018 and the second-largest consumer of coal with 452.2 Mtoe in 2018. India is also home to the world’s largest coal company, Coal India Ltd, which controls 85% of the country’s coal production with 7.8% production share of coal (including lignite) in the world. Top five hard and brown coal producing countries in 2013 (2012) are (million tons): China 3,680 (3,645), United States 893 (922), India 605 (607), Australia 478 (453) and Indonesia 421 (386). However, India ranks fifth in global coal production at 228 Mtoe (5.9%) in 2013 when its inferior quality coal tonnage is converted into tons of oil equivalent. Coal-fired power plants account for 59% of India's installed electricity capacity. After electricity production, coal is also used for cement production in substantial quantity. Pet coke availability, at a cheaper price than local coal, is replacing coal in cement plants. In financial year 2021-22, India imported nearly 209 million tons of steam coal and coking coal which is 20% of total consumption to meet the demand in electricity, cement, and steel production. In the FY2021-22, India imported nearly 57.16 million tons (90%) of coking coal against the consumption of 63.74 MT.

Gasification of coal or lignite or pet coke produces syngas or coal gas or coke oven gas which is a mixture of hydrogen, carbon monoxide and carbon dioxide gases. Coal gas can be converted into synthetic natural gas (SNG) by using Fischer–Tropsch process at high pressure and medium temperature. Coal gas can also be produced by underground coal gasification where the coal deposits are located deep in the ground or uneconomical to mine the coal. CNG and LNG are emerging as economical alternatives to diesel oil with the escalation in international crude oil prices. Synthetic natural gas production technologies have tremendous scope to meet the transport sector requirements fully using the locally available coal in India. Dankuni coal complex is producing syngas which is piped to the industrial users in Calcutta. Many coal based fertiliser plants which are shut down can also be retrofitted economically to produce SNG as LNG and CNG fetch good price by substituting imports. Recently, Indian government fixed the natural gas price at producer end as US$5.61 per million British thermal units ($19.1/MWh) on net calorific value (NCV) basis, which is at par with the estimated SNG price from coal. The abundantly available coal in India is low rank coal which is not suitable for coal gasification without blending with pet coke. However, low rank coal/lignite can be converted to SNG by using hydrogen. Talcher coal based fertilizer plant is under final stages of execution to produce 1.21 million tonnes of urea. This plant is designed to use local coal mixed with pet coke available from crude oil refineries. India is planning to use 100 million tonnes of coal for gasification by 2030.

India has recently approved the construction of new coal-fired power stations to address its increasing electricity needs, which are driven by the nation's rapid economic growth. Despite facing criticism for environmental pollution and contributing to global greenhouse emissions, These decisions aim to maintain energy security while the country gradually increases its share of renewable energy. Additionally, the government has extended the operational life of older coal plants, such as the Tuticorin facility, highlighting coal's continued importance in India's energy strategy, even as the country works toward incorporating more renewable energy sources.

India has pledged to decrease its dependence on coal, but the demands of its rapidly growing economy and increasing energy requirements tell a different story. The Tuticorin power plant in southern India, which was scheduled to be shut down because it could not meet pollution standards, continues to operate at high capacity. This scenario is indicative of a wider national trend where the need for consistent and reliable electricity often takes precedence over environmental concerns. Consequently, many older coal-fired power stations throughout India remain operational and are even undergoing expansions. Faced with the challenge of ensuring a steady power supply, the Indian government has often prioritized meeting its immediate energy needs over fulfilling its environmental promises, leading to a renewed reliance on coal. This situation has important ramifications for India's environmental targets and its contribution to global efforts aimed at reducing dependence on fossil fuels.

== Renewable energy ==
Indian solar power PV tariff has fallen to ₹2.44 (2.6¢ US) per kWh in May 2017 which is lower than any other type of power generation in India. In the year 2020, the levelized tariff in US dollars for solar PV electricity has fallen to 1.35 cents/kWh. Also the international tariff of solar thermal storage power plants has fallen to US$0.063/kWh, which is cheaper than fossil fuel plants. The cheaper hybrid solar power (mix of solar PV, wind power, and solar thermal storage power) need not depend on costly and polluting coal/gas-fired power generation for ensuring stable grid operation. Solar electricity price is going to become the benchmark price for deciding the other fuel prices (petroleum products, natural gas/biogas/LNG, CNG, LPG, coal, lignite, biomass, etc.) based on their ultimate use and advantages.

=== Biofuels ===
Gasification of char / coal

Pyrolysis of carbonaceous fuels

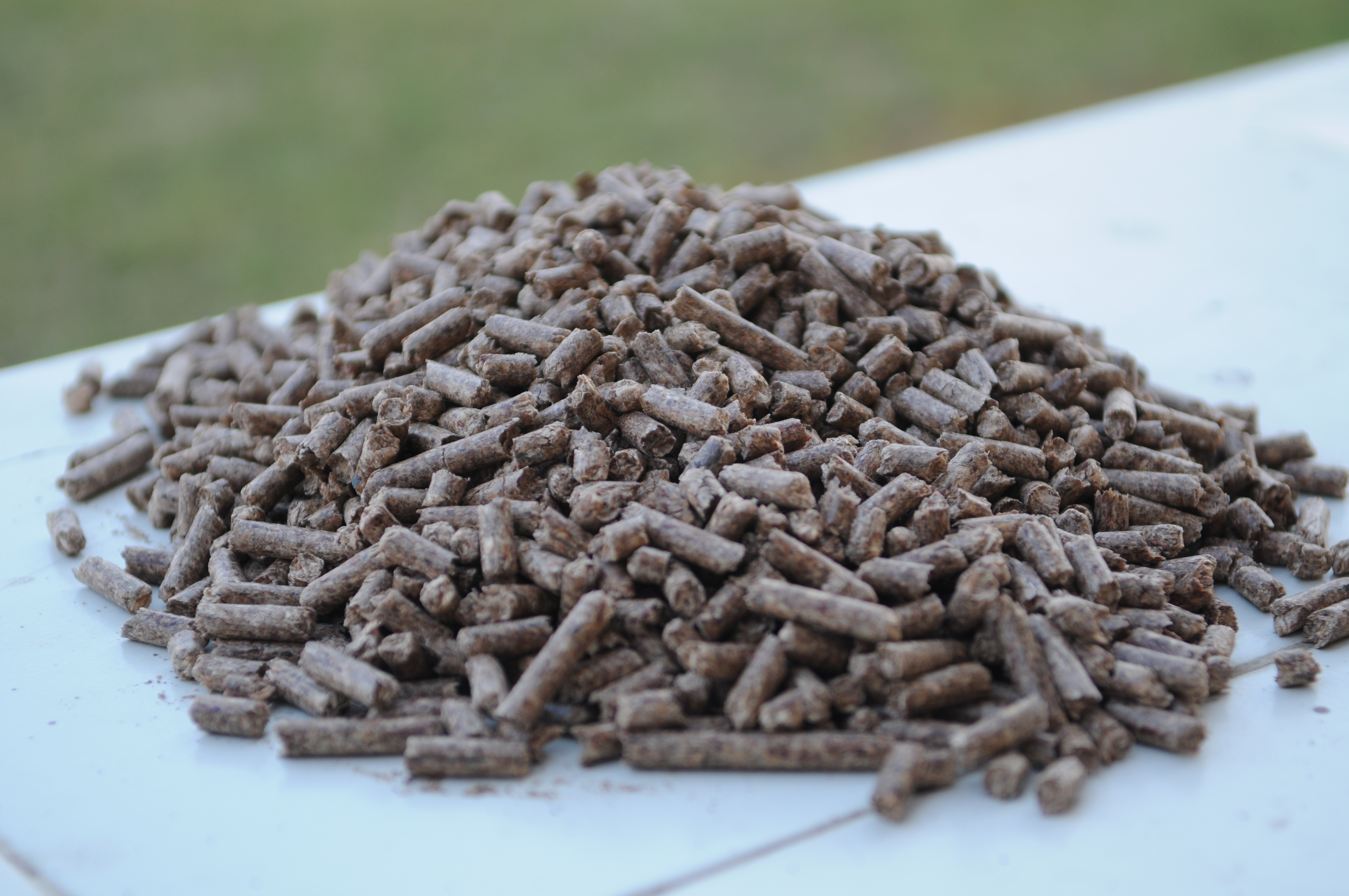
Biomass pellet fuel from India

Gasification of biomass yields wood gas or syngas which can be converted into carbon neutral methanol. Nearly 750 million tons of nonedible (by cattle) biomass is available annually in India which can be put to higher value addition use and substitute imported crude oil, coal, LNG, urea fertilizer, nuclear fuels, etc. It is estimated that the renewable and carbon-neutral biomass resources of India can replace the present consumption of all fossil fuels when used productively. Biomass is going to play a crucial role to make India self-sufficient in the energy sector and carbon neutral.

A huge quantity of imported coal is being used in pulverized coal-fired power stations. Raw biomass can not be used in pulverized coal mills as they are difficult to grind into fine powder due to caking property of raw biomass. However, biomass can be used after torrefaction in the pulverized coal mills to replace imported coal. North west and southern regions can replace imported coal use with torrefied biomass where surplus agriculture/crop residual biomass is available. Biomass power plants can also get extra income by selling the Renewable Purchase Certificates (RPC). Central Government has made cofiring (minimum 5%) of biomass mandatary from October 2022 in all coal-fired plants.

In cement production, carbon-neutral biomass is being used to replace coal for reducing carbon footprint drastically. When an existing blast furnace is modified to use biomass products as its fuel, production of green steel, green hydrogen/ammonia/urea and green slag cement are feasible.

Biogas or natural gas or methane produced from farm/agro/crop/domestic waste can also be used for producing protein rich feed for cattle/fish/poultry/pet animals economically by cultivating Methylococcus capsulatus bacteria culture in a decentralised manner near to the rural / consumption areas with tiny land and water foot print. With the availability of CO_{2} gas as by product from these units, cheaper production cost of algae oil from algae or spirulina particularly in tropical countries like India would displace the prime position of crude oil in near future.

Reliance Industries is already producing hydrogen from Torrefied Biomass from its pet coke/coal gasifiers and planning to install a blue hydrogen pilot plant of 50 tonnes per day plant using a catalytic gasification process. India's three Oil Marketing Companies (OMCs) are currently setting up 12 second-generation ethanol plants across the country which will collect agriculture waste from farmers and convert it into bio-ethanol. In 2018, India has set a target to produce 15 million tons of biogas/bio-CNG by installing 5,000 large scale commercial type biogas plants which can produce daily 12.5 tons of bio-CNG by each plant. As of May 2022, nearly 35 such plants are in operation. In September 2026, the Ministry of Petroleum and Natural Gas operationalised rules for the ₹23,731 crore GOBARdhan scheme (Galvanising Organic Bio-Agro Resources Dhan) for compressed biogas, running from 2026–27 to 2035–36. The framework offers CBG producers assured offtake of up to 100 per cent of saleable output through tripartite agreements with city gas distributors and GAIL, a government-backed administered price for at least ten years, and capital assistance, with city gas distributors required to meet a phased CBG-purchase obligation of 3 per cent in 2026–27, rising to 5 per cent from 2028–29.

Biopropane is also produced from non-edible vegetable oils, used cooking oil, waste animal fats, etc.

=== Hydro power ===
India is endowed with economically exploitable and viable hydro potential assessed to be about 125,570 MW at 60% capacity factor. India ranked fourth globally by underutilized hydropower potential. In addition, 6,780 MW in terms of installed capacity from Small, Mini, and Micro Hydel schemes have been assessed. Also, 56 sites for pumped storage schemes (PSS) with an aggregate installed capacity of 94,000 MW have been identified for catering to peak electricity demand and water pumping for irrigation needs. It is the most widely used form of renewable energy but the economically exploitable hydropower potential keeps on varying due to technological developments and the comparable cost of electricity generation from other sources. The hydro-electric potential of India ranks 5th in terms of exploitable hydro-potential on the global scenario.

The installed capacity of hydropower is 45,315 MW as of 31 May 2018. India ranks sixth in hydro electricity generation globally after China, Canada, Brazil, USA, and Russia. During the year 2017-18, the total hydroelectricity generation in India is 126.123 billion kWh which works out to 24,000 MW at a 60% capacity factor. Till now, the hydroelectricity sector is dominated by the state and central government-owned companies but this sector is going to grow faster with the participation of the private sector in developing the hydro potential located in the Himalaya mountain ranges including northeast of India. However the hydropower potential in central India forming part of Godavari, Mahanadi and Narmada river basins has not yet been developed on a major scale due to potential opposition from the tribal population.

Pumped storage including off-the-river pumped storage power schemes are perfect centralized peaking power stations for load management in the electricity grid dominated by variable renewable energy generation such as solar and wind power. PSS would be in high demand for meeting peak load demand and storing the surplus electricity as India graduates from an electricity deficit to an electricity surplus. They also produce secondary /seasonal power at no additional cost when rivers are flooding with excess water. Storing electricity by other alternative systems such as batteries, compressed air storage systems, etc is costlier than electricity production by standby generator. India has already established nearly 4785 MW pumped storage capacity which is part of its installed hydro power plants.

=== Wind power ===
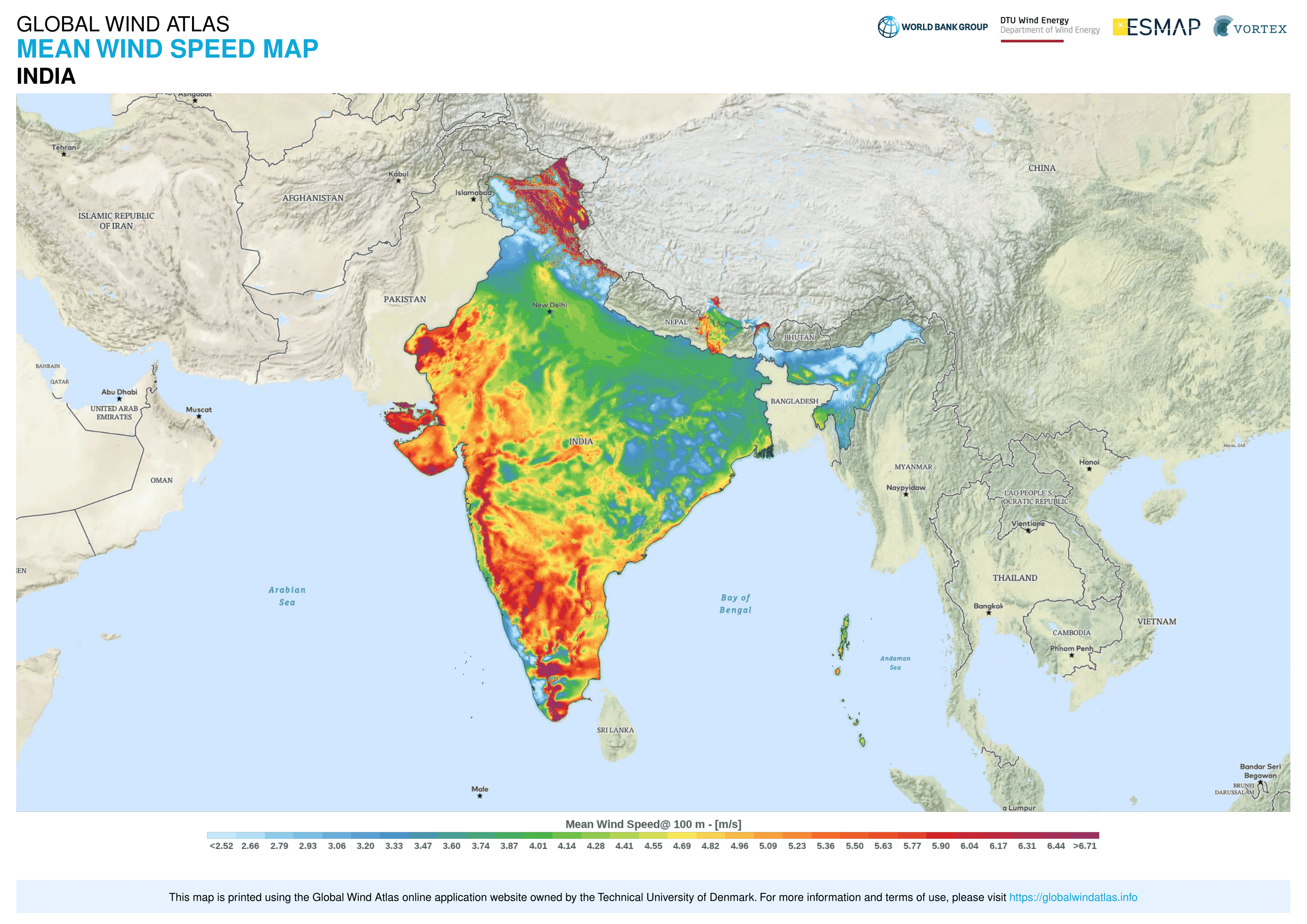
Mean wind speed in India

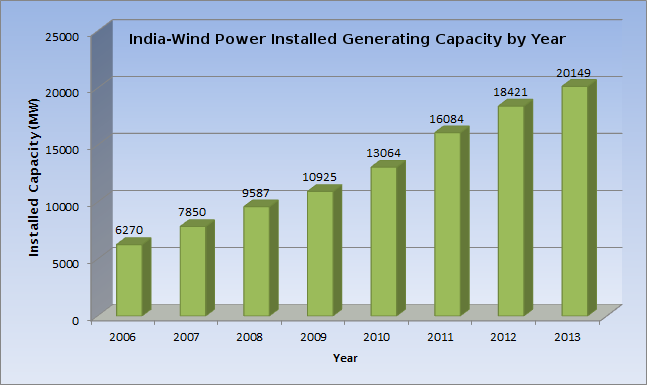
Progress in India's installed wind power generating capacity since 2006

India has the fourth largest installed wind power capacity in the world. As of 31 December 2017, the installed capacity of wind power was 32,848 MW an increase of 4148 MW over the previous year Wind power accounts for nearly 10% of India's total installed power generation capacity and generated 52.666 billion kWh in the fiscal year 2017-18 which is nearly 3% of total electricity generation. The capacity utilisation factor is nearly 16% in the fiscal year 2017-18. The Ministry of New and Renewable Energy (MNRE) of India has announced a revised estimation of the potential wind power resource (excluding offshore wind power potential) from 49,130 MW assessed at 50m Hub heights to 102,788 MW assessed at 80m Hub height at 15% capacity factor.

=== Solar energy ===
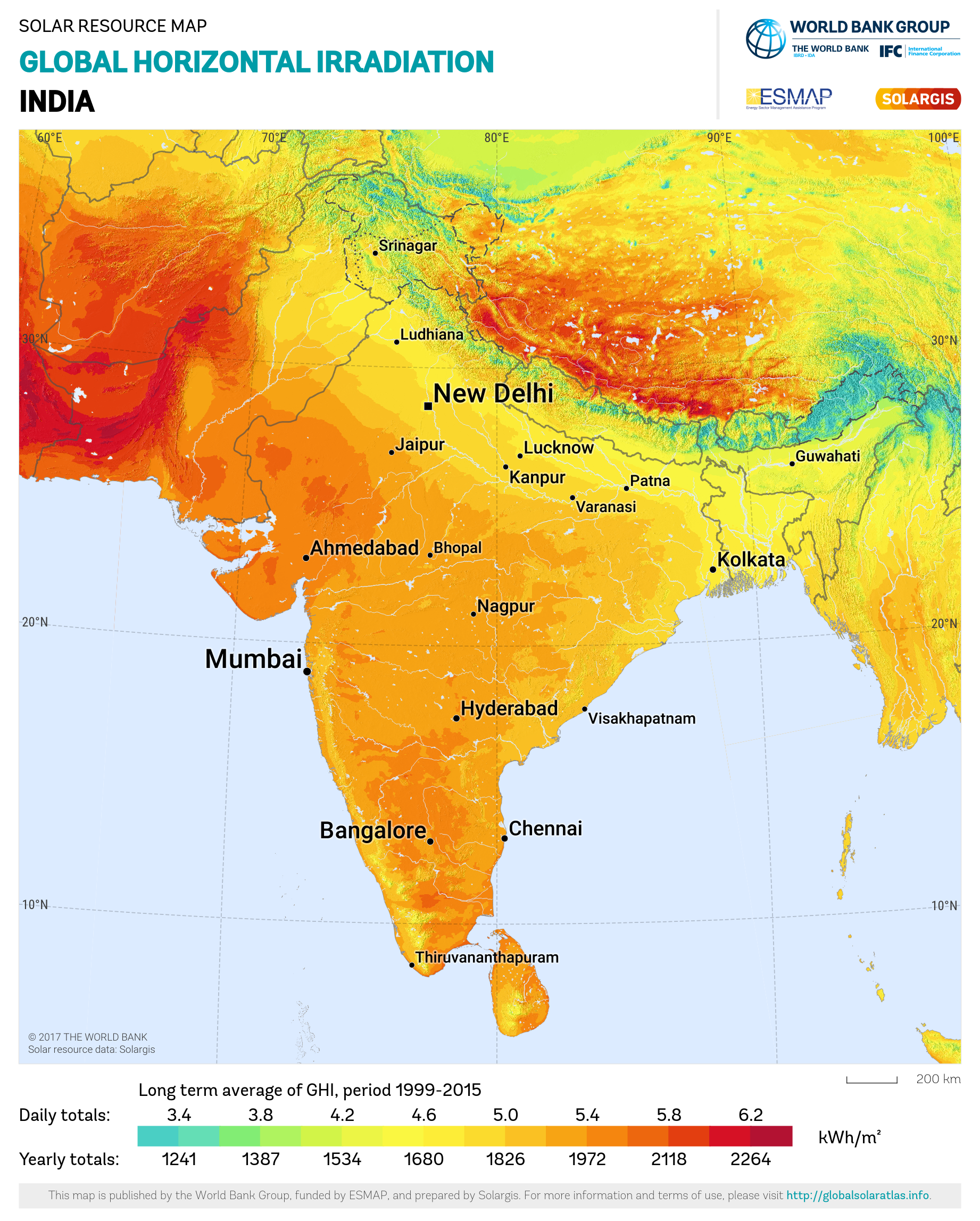
Global horizontal irradiation in India

India's solar energy insolation is about 5,000 T kWh per year (i.e. ~ 600 TW), far more than its current total primary energy consumption. India's long-term solar potential could be unparalleled in the world because it has the ideal combination of both high solar insolation and a big potential consumer base density. Also a major factor influencing a region's energy intensity is the cost of energy consumed for temperature control. Since cooling load requirements are roughly in phase with the sun's intensity, cooling from intense solar radiation could make perfect energy-economic sense in the subcontinent located mostly in the tropics.

Installation of solar power PV plants requires nearly 2.0 hectares (5 acres) of land per MW capacity which is similar to coal-fired power plants when life cycle coal mining, consumptive water storage & ash disposal areas are also accounted for, and hydropower plants when submergence area of the water reservoir is also accounted. 1.6 million MW capacity solar plants can be installed in India on its 1% land (32,000 square km). There are vast tracts of land suitable for solar power in all parts of India exceeding 8% of its total area which are unproductive barren and devoid of vegetation. Part of wastelands (32,000 square km) when installed with solar power plants can produce 2400 billion kWh of electricity (two times the total generation in 2013-14) with land productivity/yield of 0.9 million Rs per acre (3 Rs/kWh price) which is at par with many industrial areas and many times more than the best productive irrigated agriculture lands. Moreover, these solar power units are not dependent on the supply of any raw material and are self productive. There is unlimited scope for solar electricity to replace all fossil fuel energy requirements (natural gas, coal, lignite, and crude oil) if all the marginally productive lands are occupied by solar power plants in the future. The solar power potential of India can meet perennially to cater to per capita energy consumption at par with USA/Japan for the peak population in its demographic transition.

==== Solar thermal power ====
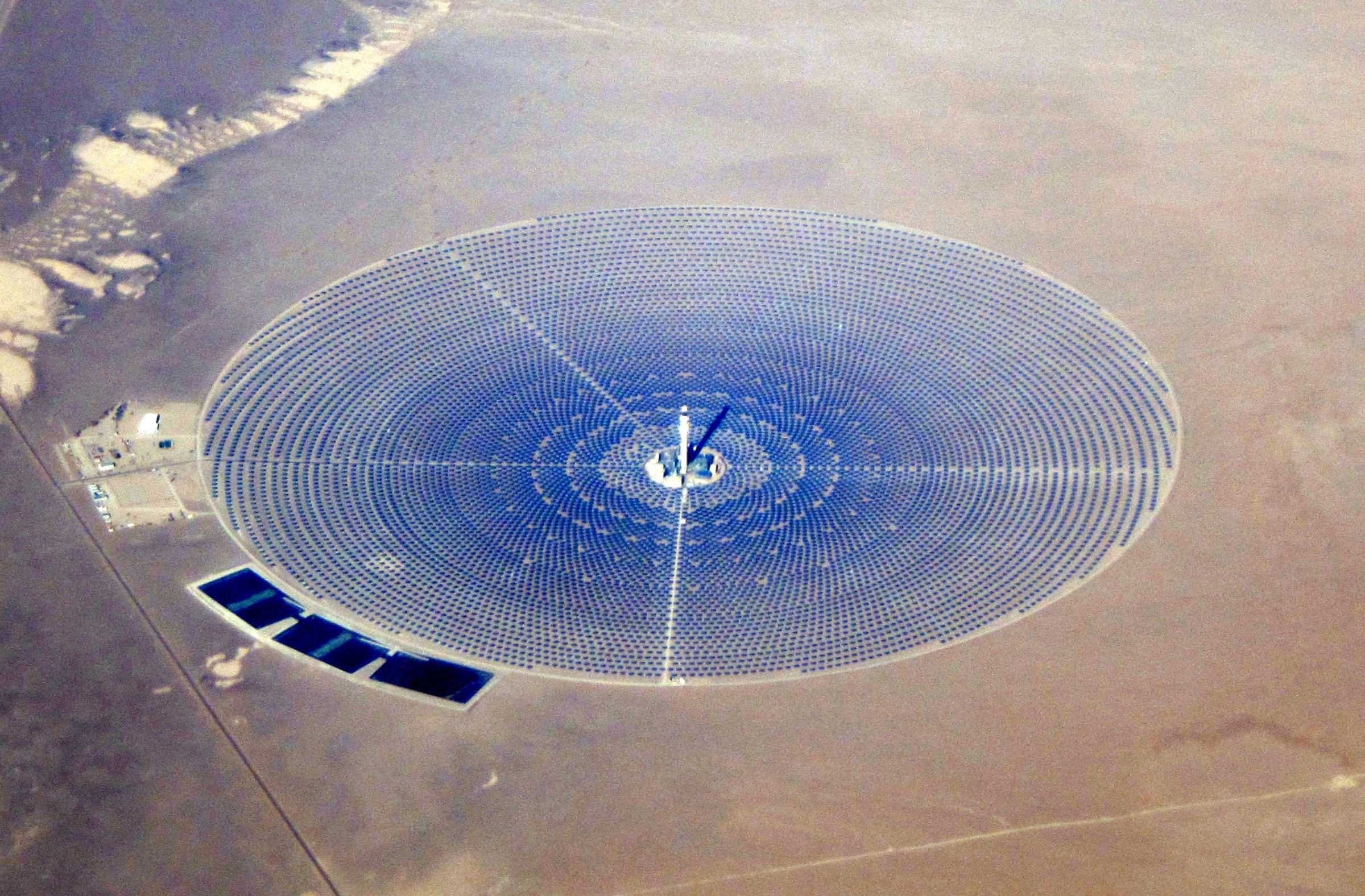
Typical tower type CSP plant

The installed capacity of commercial solar thermal power plants in India is 227.5 MW with 50 MW in Andhra Pradesh and 177.5 MW in Rajasthan. Solar thermal plants are emerging as cheaper (6 Euro ¢/kWh) and clean load following power plants compared to fossil fuel power plants. They can cater the load/ demand perfectly and work as base load power plants when the extracted solar energy is found excess in a day. Proper mix of solar thermal and solar PV can fully match the load fluctuations without the need of costly battery storage.

==== Synergy with irrigation water pumping and hydropower stations ====
Price history of silicon PV cells since 1977. Solar power is a technology and not a fuel. It is unlimited, and the more it is deployed, the cheaper it will be. In contrast, the more limited fossil fuels are used, the more expensive they become.

The major disadvantage of solar power (PV type only) is that it can not produce electricity during the nighttime and cloudy daytime also. In India, this disadvantage can be overcome by installing pumped-storage hydroelectricity stations to store the surplus electricity generated during the daytime for meeting the demand during the night hours. In addition to harnessing most of the water resources, the embankment canals originating from the coastal reservoirs would also be envisaged with pumped-storage hydroelectricity features to store the surplus electricity available during the daytime and reconvert to electricity during the nighttime. This is achieved by utilizing all the usable river waters by interlinking Indian rivers and envisaging coastal reservoirs. Also, all existing and future hydropower stations can be expanded with additional pumped-storage hydroelectricity units to cater nighttime electricity consumption. Most of the groundwater pumping power can be met directly by solar power during the daytime. To achieve food security, India needs to achieve water security which is possible only by energy security for harnessing its water resources.

==== Electric vehicles ====
The retail prices of petrol, diesel, LPG and CNG are high enough in India to make electricity driven vehicles relatively economical. The retail price of diesel was 101.00 ₹/liter in 2021–22, and the retail price of petrol was 110.00 ₹/liter. The affordable retail electricity price to replace diesel would be up to 19 ₹/kWh (860 Kcal/kWh at 75% input electricity to shaft power efficiency versus diesel's net calorific value of 8572 Kcal/liter at 40% fuel energy to crankshaft power efficiency), and the comparable number to replace petrol would be up to 28 ₹/kWh (860 Kcal/kWh at 75% input electricity to shaft power efficiency versus petrol's net calorific value at 7693 Kcal/liter at 33% fuel energy to crankshaft power efficiency). In 2021–22, India consumed 30.849 million tons of petrol and 76.687 million tons of diesel, both mainly produced from imported crude oil. To spread the use of electric vehicles rapidly and reduce the consumption of imported fossil fuels, electricity sale prices at rapid (DC) charging centers could be subsidized to below 5 ₹/kWh. Thus owners of commercial passenger and goods vehicles can be attracted to switch to costly electric vehicles which do not contribute to surface air pollution.

Electricity-driven vehicles are expected to become popular in India when energy storage/battery technology offers improved range, longer life, and lower maintenance. Conversion of old petrol and diesel vehicles to battery electric vehicles is also feasible as the battery pack prices become affordable. Vehicle to grid options are also attractive, potentially allowing electric vehicles in helping to mitigate peak loads in the electricity grid. Discarded batteries of electric vehicles are also used as energy storage systems economically. Battery pack prices have fallen to US$ 100 per kWh in early 2025 to compete with conventional ICE vehicles. The potential for continuous charging of electric vehicles through wireless electricity transmission technology is being explored by Indian companies and others.

== Others ==
=== Nuclear power ===
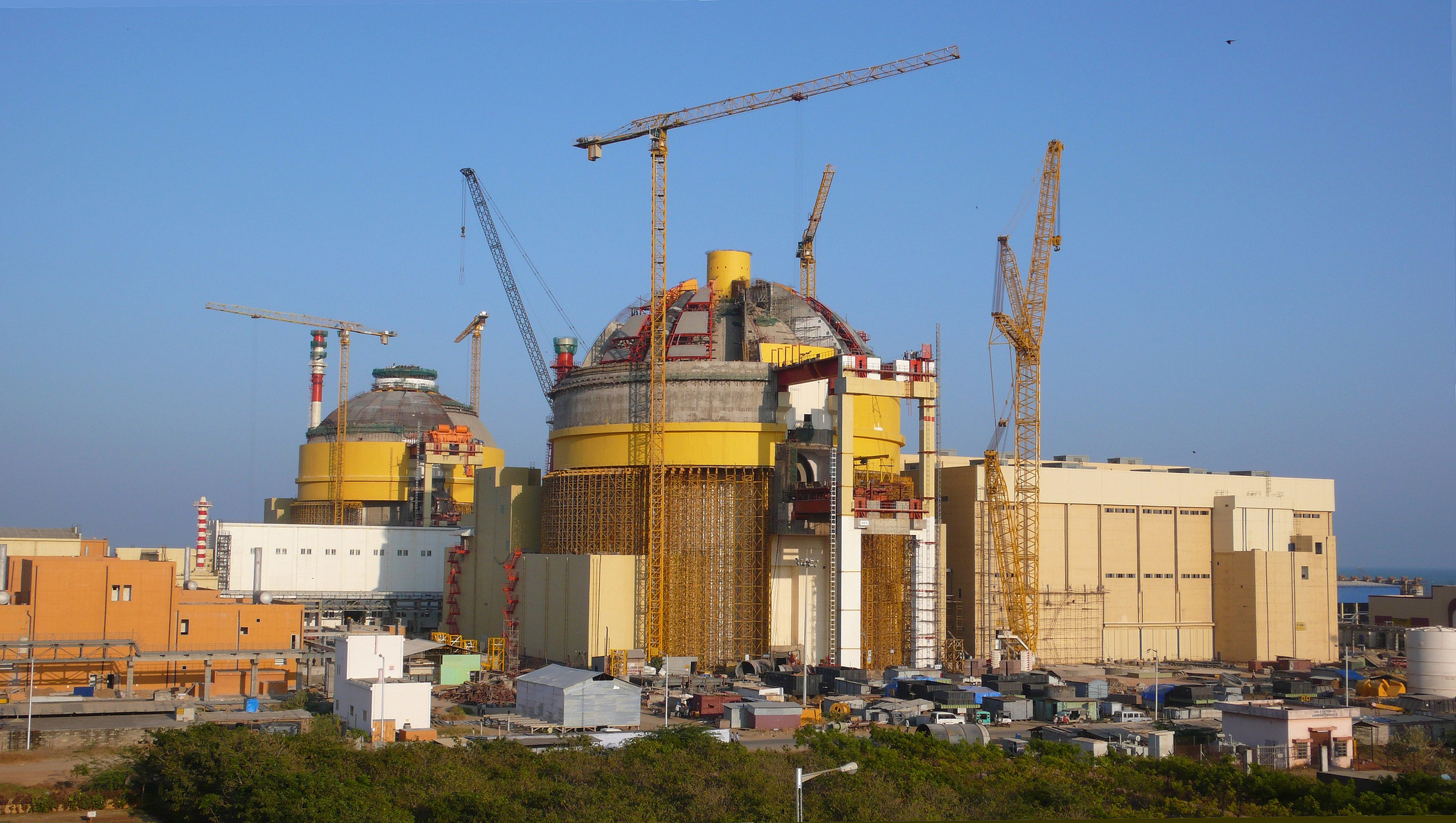
The Kudankulam Nuclear power plant (2x1000 MW) in Tamil Nadu while under construction

India boasts a quickly advancing and active nuclear power program. It is expected to have 20 GW of nuclear capacity by 2020, though it currently stands as 9th in the world in terms of nuclear capacity.

An Achilles' heel of the Indian nuclear power program, is the fact that India is not a signatory of the Nuclear Non-Proliferation Treaty. This has many times in its history prevented it from obtaining nuclear technology vital to expanding its nuclear industry. Another consequence of this is that much of its program has been domestically developed much like its nuclear weapons program. The United States-India Peaceful Atomic Energy Cooperation Act seems to be a way to get access to advanced nuclear technologies for India.

India has been using imported enriched uranium and is under International Atomic Energy Agency (IAEA) safeguards, but it has developed various aspects of the nuclear fuel cycle to support its reactors. The development of select technologies has been strongly affected by limited imports. The use of heavy-water reactors has been particularly attractive for the nation because it allows uranium to be burnt with little to no enrichment. India has also done a great amount of work in the development of a thorium-centered fuel cycle. While uranium deposits in the nation are extremely limited, there are much greater reserves of thorium, and it could provide hundreds of times the energy with the same mass of fuel. The fact that thorium can theoretically be utilized in heavy water reactors has tied the development of the two. A prototype reactor that would burn uranium-plutonium fuel while irradiating a thorium blanket is under construction at the Madras/Kalpakkam Atomic Power Station.

Uranium used for the weapons program has been separate from the power program using uranium from scant indigenous reserves.

=== Hydrogen energy ===
The national hydrogen energy road map is constantly evolving in India by consolidating various capabilities at institutional and research centers. The Hydrogen Energy program started in India after joining the IPHE (International Partnership for Hydrogen Economy) in the year 2003. There are nineteen other countries including Australia, United States, UK, Japan, etc. This global partnership helps India to set up commercial use of Hydrogen gas as an energy source. India is already producing blue hydrogen from biomass using the petcoke gasifiers. Nearly 412,000 metric tons/year capacity green hydrogen projects are awarded to produce green hydrogen by the end of 2026.

Hydrogen is a carbon neutral fuel. Solar electricity prices in India have already fallen below the affordable price (≈ INR 5.00 per kWh to generate 0.041 lb/kWh hydrogen which is equivalent to 0.071 litres of petrol in terms of lower heating value) to make hydrogen economical fuel by sourcing from electrolysis of water to replace petrol/gasoline as transport fuel. Vehicles with fuel cell technology based on hydrogen gas are nearly twice more efficient compared to diesel/petrol-fueled engines. Hydrogen can be generated cheaply by splitting methane using electricity without emitting any greenhouse gas and also extracted from wood gas produced from carbon-neutral biomass. A luxury FCEV car generates one liter of bottled quality drinking water for every 10 km ride which is a significant byproduct. Also FCEV does not emit any particulate matter but removes particulate matter up to PM2.5 from the ambient air. Any medium or heavy duty vehicle can be retrofitted in to fuel cell vehicle as its system power density (watts/litre) and system specific power (watts/kg) are comparable with that of internal combustion engine. The cost and durability of fuel cell engines with economies of scale production line are comparable with the petrol/diesel engines.

The excess power generation capacity available in India is nearly 500 billion units/year presently and another 75,000 MW conventional power generating capacity is in pipeline excluding the targeted 175,000 MW renewable power by 2022. The hydrogen fuel generated by 500 billion units of electricity can replace all diesel and petrol consumed by heavy and medium duty vehicles in India completely obviating the need of crude oil imports for internal consumption. Use of hydrogen as fuel to replace jet fuel by aircraft is also a promising proposition. Converting petrol/diesel driven road vehicles in to fuel cell electric vehicles on priority would save the huge import cost of crude oil and transform the stranded electricity infrastructure into productive assets with major boost to the overall economic growth. Hydrogen spiked CNG is made available in Delhi to reduce pollution emissions from BS-IV compliant old buses. Low rank coal/lignite can be converted to SNG by using hydrogen.

== Electricity as a substitute for imported LPG and PNG ==
India's net import of liquefied petroleum gas (LPG) is 16.607 million tons and the domestic consumption is 25.502 million tons which is 90% of total consumption in 2021–22. The LPG import content is nearly 57% of total consumption in 2021–22. The affordable electricity retail tariff (860 Kcal/kWh at 74% heating efficiency) to replace LPG (net calorific value 11,000 Kcal/Kg at 40% heating efficiency) in domestic cooking is up to 10.2 ₹/kWh when the retail price of LPG cylinder is ₹1000 (without subsidy) with 14.2 kg LPG content. Replacing LPG consumption with electricity would reduce imports substantially.

India's piped natural gas (PNG) for domestic cooking needs was 12,175 million standard cubic meters (mmscm) which is nearly 19% of total natural gas consumption in 2021–22. Natural gas/ LNG import content is nearly 56% of total consumption in 2021–22. The affordable electricity retail tariff (860 Kcal/kWh at 74% heating efficiency) to replace PNG (net calorific value 8,500 Kcal/scm at 40% heating efficiency) in domestic cooking is up to 9 ₹/kWh when the retail price of PNG is ₹47.59 per scm. Replacing PNG consumption with electricity would reduce costly LNG imports substantially.

The domestic consumption of kerosene is 1.291 million tons out of 1.493 million tons total consumption in 2021–22. The subsidized retail price of kerosene is 15 ₹/liter whereas the export/import price is 79 ₹/liter. The affordable electricity retail tariff (860 Kcal/kWh at 74% heating efficiency) to replace kerosene (net calorific value 8240 Kcal/liter at 40% heating efficiency) in domestic cooking is up to 15.22 ₹/kWh when the kerosene retail price is 79 ₹/liter.

In 2024–25, the plant load factor (PLF) of coal-fired thermal power stations (nearly 222 GW) was only 68.45%. These stations can run above 85% PLF if there is adequate electricity demand. The possible additional net electricity generation at 85% PLF is nearly 320 billion kWh which is enough to replace all the LPG, PNG, and kerosene consumption in the domestic sector. The incremental cost of generating additional electricity is only the coal fuel cost, less than 3 ₹/kWh. Enhancing the PLF of coal-fired stations and encouraging domestic electricity consumers to substitute electricity in place of LPG, PNG, and kerosene in household cooking would reduce government subsidies. It has been proposed that domestic consumers who are willing to surrender subsidized LPG/kerosene permits should be given a free electricity connection and a subsidized electricity tariff. To avoid the possibility of fatal electric shocks and improve the safety standard more than that of LPG cooking, power is supplied to the electric cook stove through a residual-current circuit breaker.

The power demand in India, peaks during the morning and evening hours mainly due to electricity consumption for water heating. To moderate the peak power demand, heat pump water heaters are available which consume 2 to 3 times less electricity for the same heat load.

Substantial scope is also present in micro, small, and medium enterprises (MSME) to switch over to electricity from fossil fuels to reduce the cost of production provided uninterrupted power supply is ensured. Since 2017, IPPs have been offering to sell solar and wind power below 3.00 ₹/kWh to feed into the high voltage grid. After considering distribution costs and losses, solar power appears to be a viable economic option for replacing the LPG, PNG, kerosene, etc. used in the domestic and MSME sectors. In August 2024, renewable power producers are offering firm and dispatchable renewable electricity at 4.98 ₹/kWh (0.06 $/kWh) which is economical to replace fossil fuels in above applications. This price is below the affordable electricity tariff for the solar power to replace LPG, PNG, and Kerosene use at a subsidized price of LPG or Kerosene in the domestic sector.

Two wheelers and three wheelers consume 62% and 6% of petrol respectively in India. The saved LPG/Autogas replaced by electricity in the domestic sector can be used by two and three wheelers with operational cost and least pollution benefits. LPG is also used in heavy-duty vehicles/boats / trains / off-road construction or mining or farming or other equipment to replace diesel or petrol with economy and environmental advantages. It is also possible to convert the existing heavy-duty diesel engines to dual fuel with LPG for reducing the PM10 particulate emissions. Existing petrol engines can be converted at low cost into 100% LPG or dual fuel with LPG for achieving enhanced fuel efficiency and economy with drastically reduced emissions. Non-subsidy LPG prices are below the diesel or petrol prices in India in terms of heat content (heat content-wise one kg of LPG is equal to 1.85 liters of LPG or 1.37 liters of diesel oil or 1.48 liters of petrol). Cheaper butane, a constituent of LPG (propane and butane mixture), can be directly mixed with petrol/gasoline for better use in vehicles. Instead of using LPG as a heating fuel in the domestic sector, for higher-end usage, propane can also be converted into alkylate which is a premium gasoline blending stock because it has exceptional antiknock properties and gives clean burning. Propane can be used in hydrogen/ammonia production with advantages compared to natural gas and also can be transported much cheaper than LNG or natural gas.

== Energy trading with neighboring countries ==
The per capita electricity consumption is low compared to many countries despite cheaper electricity tariff in India. Despite low electricity per capita consumption in India, the country is going to achieve surplus electricity generation during the 12th plan (2012 to 2017) period provided its coal production and transport infrastructure is developed adequately. India has been exporting electricity to Bangladesh and Nepal and importing excess electricity in Bhutan. Surplus electricity can be exported to the neighbouring countries in return for natural gas supplies from Pakistan, Bangladesh and Myanmar.

Bangladesh, Myanmar, and Pakistan are producing substantial natural gas and using for electricity generation purposes. Bangladesh, Myanmar and Pakistan produce 55 million cubic metres per day (mcmd), 9 mcmd and 118 mcmd out of which 20 mcmd, 1.4 mcmd and 34 mcmd are consumed for electricity generation respectively. Whereas the natural gas production in India is not even adequate to meet its non-electricity requirements.

Bangladesh, Myanmar, and Pakistan have proven reserves of 200 billion cubic meters (bcm), 1200 bcm, and 500 bcm respectively. There is ample opportunity for mutually beneficial trading in energy resources with these countries. India can supply its surplus electricity to Pakistan and Bangladesh in return for the natural gas imports by gas pipelines. Similarly India can develop on BOOT basis hydro power projects in Bhutan, Nepal and Myanmar. India might also be able to enter into long-term power purchase agreements with China for developing the hydropower potential of the Yarlung Tsangpo Grand Canyon in the Brahmaputra River basin of Tibet. There is ample trading synergy for India with its neighboring countries in securing its energy requirements.

India's National Grid is synchronously interconnected to Bhutan, and asynchronously linked with Bangladesh, Myanmar and Nepal. An undersea interconnection to Sri Lanka (India–Sri Lanka HVDC Interconnection) have been proposed. Sri Lanka can also export its surplus renewable energy (solar, onshore wind, offshore wind, etc) to india in future.

In 2015, Nepal imported 224.21 MW of electric power from India, and Bangladesh imported 500 MW. In 2018, Bangladesh proposed importing 10,000 MW power from India. To encourage the carbon neutral solar power generation, plans are made to transform the Indian national grid into a transnational grid expanding up to Vietnam towards east and Saudi Arabia towards west spanning nearly 7,000 km wide. Being at the central location of the widened grid, India will be able to import the excess solar power available outside its territory at cheaper prices to meet the morning and evening peak load power demands without much costly energy storage.

== Policy framework ==
In general, India's strategy is to encourage the development of renewable sources of energy by offering financial incentives from the federal and state governments. With the abundant solar energy resource combined with adequate high head pumped hydroelectric energy storage potential, India is capable to meet the ultimate energy requirements of its peak population from its renewable energy sources alone. In 2021, the government has upped India’s target to 500 GW of renewable energy by 2030. Increasing energy consumption associated primarily with activities in transport, mining, and manufacturing in India needs rethinking on India's energy production. In India where most of the crude oil and natural gas are imported, the negative effects (externalities or liability to the society) is up to five times of the revenue from fossil fuels in the year 2021.

The following trends are manifested in the energy policy to achieve energy self-sufficiency, least pollution, climate change mitigation, and long-term sustainability.

Purpose	Preferred fuel	Next preferred fuel	Least preferred fuel
Mobile military hardware	Indigenous diesel, Indigenous petrol	Ethanol, biodiesel	Nil
Air transport	Biodiesel, biomethanol, bioethanol	LNG, ammonia	ATF, HSK
Marine transport	Biomethanol, biodiesel, bioethanol, nuclear fuel, battery power	Pyrolysis oil, LNG, CNG, FCEV	LDO, HFO, bunker fuel, diesel
Heavy-duty road vehicles	FCEV, battery power	Bio methanol, bioethanol, biodiesel, LNG, CNG, LPG	Diesel, animal draught power
Passenger four-wheel vehicles	Battery power, FCEV	Biodiesel, bio methanol, bioethanol, LPG, CNG	Diesel, petrol
Passenger two/three-wheel vehicles	Battery power	Biodiesel, bio methanol, bioethanol, LPG, CNG	Petrol, animal draught power
Railways	Electricity, FCEV	Biodiesel, bio methanol, bioethanol, LNG, LPG	Diesel
Illumination / lighting	Electricity, bio CNG	CNG, LPG	Kerosene
Cooking	Electricity, bio methanol, bio CNG	CNG, biochar	Kerosene, LPG, firewood
Space & water heating	Electricity, pyrolysis oil, biochar, solar energy, bio methanol, bio CNG	CNG	Kerosene, LPG, firewood
Commercial / domestic - appliances	Electricity	Battery power, biomethanol, bioethanol	Diesel, petrol, LPG, CNG
Industrial-motive power	Electricity, bio methanol, bioethanol, bio CNG	Biodiesel, pyrolysis oil	CNG, LPG, diesel, petrol
Industrial - heating	Electricity, solar thermal energy, biomass, pyrolysis oil, biochar	Biogas, PNG	Kerosene, LPG, firewood
Urea fertilizer	Biogas / syngas, biochar, electricity, biomass	Natural gas, indigenous petcoke	Naphtha, coal
Pipeline transport	Electricity	Biodiesel, hydrogen fuel cell generator	Natural gas, diesel
Water pumping	Electricity, biodiesel	LPG	Kerosene, diesel, petrol
Agriculture - heating & drying	Biomass, pyrolysis oil, solar energy	LPG, electricity	Diesel, petrol
Agriculture - appliances	Electricity, LPG	Biodiesel, pyrolysis oil	CNG, diesel, petrol
Bitcoin mining and data centers	Carbon neutral electricity	Cheaper electricity generated from fossil fuels	Costly electricity sourced from fossil fuels
Electricity generation	Solar power, wind, hydropower, biomass, torrifacted biomass, biochar, biogas plant residue, pumped-storage hydroelectricity	CNG, animal draught power (peaking power only), battery energy storage system	Petrol, diesel, NGL, LPG, LDO, HFO, naptha, nuclear, coal, petcoke
Steel production	Torrefied biomass, bio-coke, charcoal, biochar	Renewable electricity, renewable hydrogen, LPG, CNG	Coke, coal
Cement production	Indigenous petcoke, biomass, waste organic matter, renewable electricity	LPG, CNG	Coal
Road construction	Bioasphalt, carbon neutral cement	Cement	Asphalt
Feed stock for petrochemicals	Bio methanol and green hydrogen produced from biomass, acetylene and hydrogen generated by renewable electricity, biogas	Substitute natural gas, bioethanol, biodiesel, ACC and green hydrogen	Ethane, naptha
Protein rich cattle/fish feed	CNG, PNG, biogas, LNG	SNG from coal, coalbed methane, coal mine methane, SNG from renewable electricity, SNG from the indigenous petcoke	Nil
Industrial - raw materials	As economically required	Nil	Nil

== Energy conservation and carbon trading ==
The greenest energy is the energy we do not use. Energy conservation has emerged as a major policy objective, and the Energy Conservation Act 2001 was passed by the Indian Parliament in September 2001. This Act requires large energy consumers to adhere to energy consumption norms; new buildings to follow the Energy Conservation Building Code, and appliances to meet energy performance standards and to display energy consumption labels. The Act also created the Bureau of Energy Efficiency to implement the provisions of the Act. In 2015, Prime Minister Mr. Modi launched a scheme called Prakash Path urging people to use LED lamps in place of other lamps to drastically cut down lighting power requirements and the evening peak electricity load. Energy efficient brushless DC fans at subsidized prices are offered to the electricity consumers by the electricity distribution companies (DisComs) to decrease peak electricity load.

Energy saving certificates (PAT), various renewable purchase obligations (RPO), and renewable energy certificates (REC) are also traded on the power exchanges regularly. Recent amendment to Energy Conservation Act in December 2022 included carbon trading provisions, green fuels mandatory use, etc. As of May 2023, carbon emission trading system or carbon trading market is not started in India. Enhancing soil carbon or sequestration of carbon in topsoil is feasible by converting desert and semi-desert lands into a lush green farm or forest lands using the available water resources fully.

== Electricity generation ==
The installed capacity of utility power plants is 314.64 GW as on 31 January 2017 and the gross electricity generated by utilities during the year 2015-16 was 1168.359 billion kWh which includes auxiliary power consumption of power generating stations. The installed capacity of captive power plants in industries (1 MW and above) was 50,289 MW as on 31 March 2017, and they generated 197 billion kWh in the financial year 2016-17. In addition, there are nearly 75,000 MW aggregate capacity diesel generator sets with units sizes between 100 KVA and 1000 KVA. All India per capita consumption of electricity was nearly 1,122 kWh during the financial year 2016-17.

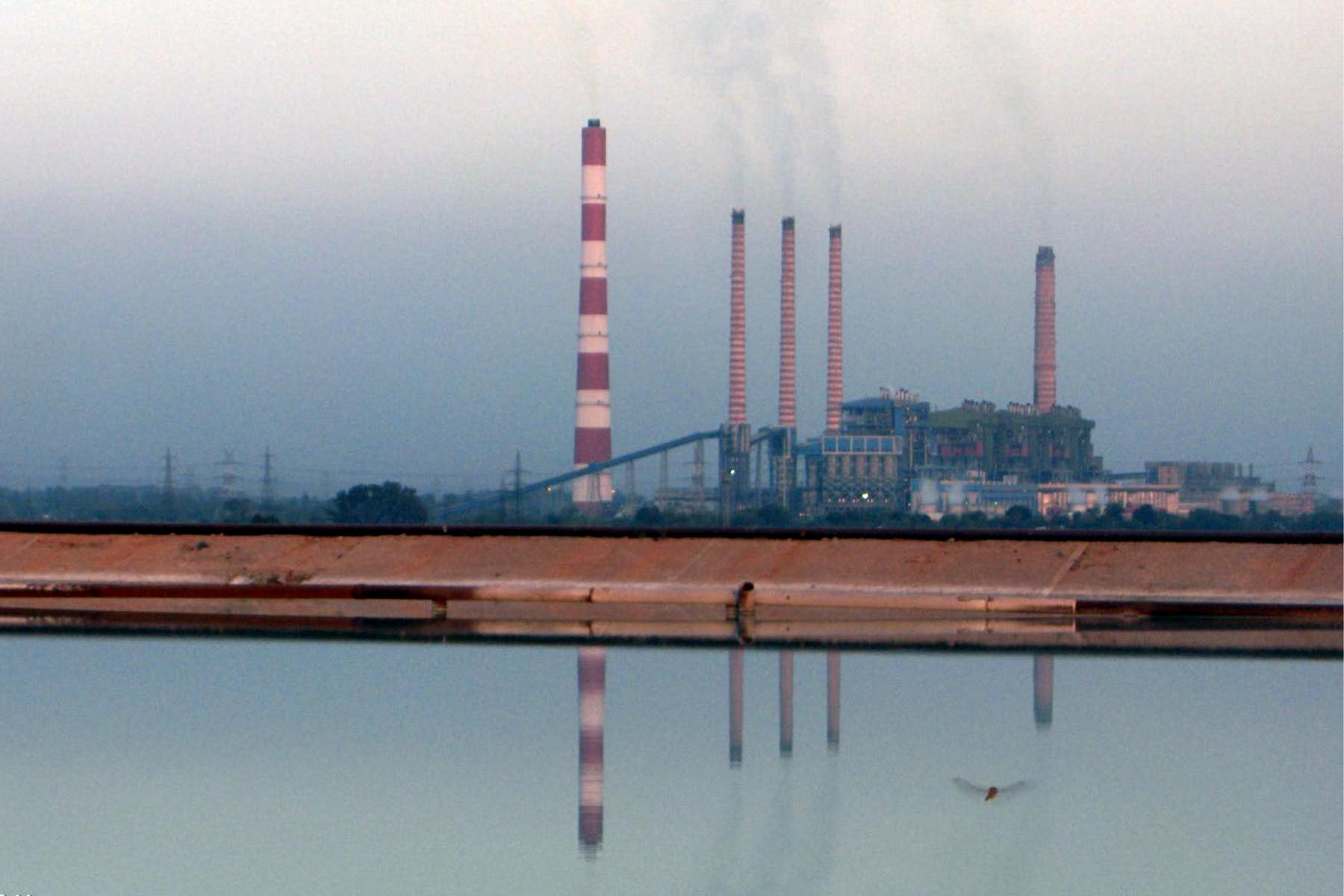
Ramagundam Thermal Power Station (2600 MW), Telangana

Total installed power generation capacity (end of April 2017)

Source	Utilities capacity (MW)	%	Captive power capacity (MW)	%
Coal	194,402.88	59.9	29,888.00	59.43
Hydroelectricity	44,594.42	14.0	64.00	0.11
Renewable energy source	50,018.00	15.9	Included in Oil	-
Natural gas	25,329.38	8.1	6,061.00	12.05
Nuclear	6,780.00	1.8	-	-
Oil	837.63	0.3	14,285.00	28.41
Total	329,204.53		50,289.00	100

The total installed utility power generation capacity as on 30 April 2017 with sector wise & type wise break up is as given below.

Sector	Thermal (MW)				Nuclear (MW)	Renewable (MW)		Total (MW)	%
Sector	Coal	Gas	Diesel	Sub-total thermal	Nuclear (MW)	Hydro	Other renewable	Total (MW)	%
Central	55,245.00	7,490.83	0.00	62,735.83	6,780.00	11,651.42	0.00	81,167.25	25
State	65,145.50	7,257.95	363.93	72,767.38	0.00	29,703.00	1,963.80	104,447.28	32
Private	74,012.38	10,580.60	473.70	85,066.68	0.00	3,240.00	55,283.33	143,590.01	43
All India	194,402.88	25,329.38	837.63	220,569.88	6,780.00	44,594.42	57,260.23	329,204.53	100

Yearly gross electricity generation – mode wise (GWh)
Year	Fossil fuel			Nuclear	Hydro	Sub- total	RES						Utility and captive power			
Year	Coal	Oil	Gas	Nuclear	Hydro	Sub- total	Mini hydro	Solar	Wind	Bio mass	Other	Sub- total	Utility	Captive	Misc.	Total
2021–22	1,078,444	115	36,143	47,019	151,695	1,313,418	10,463	73,483	68,640	16,056	2,268	170,912	1,484,442	235,000	na	1,719,442
2020-21	981,239	129	51,027	42,949	150,305	1,225,649	10,258	60,402	60,150	14,816	1621	147,247	1,373,187	200,000	na	1,573,187
2019-20	995,840	108	48,497	46,381	155,970	1,246,796	9,366	50,103	64,639	13,843	366	138,318	1,385,114	239,567	na	1,622,983
2018-19	1,021,997	129	49,886	37,706	135,040	1,244,758	8,703	39,268	62,036	16,325	425	126,757	1,371,517	175,000	na	1,546,517
2017-18	986,591	386	50,208	38,346	126,123	1,201,653	5,056	25,871	52,666	15,252	358	101,839	1,303,493	183,000	na	1,486,493
2016-17	944,850	262	49,100	37,663	122,313	1,154,188	7,673	12,086	46,011	14,159	213	81,949	1,236,137	197,000	na	1,433,392
2015-16	896,260	406	47,122	37,413	121,377	1,102,578	8,355	7,450	28,604	16,681	269	65,781	1,168,359	183,611	na	1,351,970
2014-15	835,838	1,407	41,075	36,102	129,244	1,043,666	8,060	4,600	28,214	14,944	414	61,780	1,105,446	166,426	na	1,271,872
2013-14	746,087	1,868	44,522	34,228	134,847	961,552	na	3,350	na	na	na	59,615	1,021,167	156,643	na	1,177,810
2012-13	691,341	2,449	66,664	32,866	113,720	907,040	na	na	na	na	na	57,449	964,489	144,009	na	1,108,498
2011-12	612,497	2,649	93,281	32,286	130,511	871,224	na	na	na	na	na	51,226	922,451	134,387	na	1,056,838

Notes: Coal includes lignite; Misc: includes contributions from emergency diesel generator sets; ^{*}Hydro includes pumped storage generation; na = data not available.

In 2019-20, the total generation from all renewable energy sources is nearly 20% of the total electricity generation (utility and captive) in India.

=== Integration of renewable power ===
India has committed to install 275,000 MW renewable energy capacity by 2027. The existing base load coal and gas based power plants need to be flexible enough to accommodate the variable renewable energy. Also ramping up, ramping down, warm start up, hot start up capabilities of existing coal based power stations are critical to accommodate the frequent variations in renewable power generation. It is also examined to use the retired coal based electric generators as synchronous condensers for improving the grid inertia when it is dominated by static power generation sources like solar and wind power. As the solar power plants remain idle during the night hours, reactive power capability of the inverters installed as part of the solar power plant can also be used during the night time for solving the problem of very high voltage which occurs due to low loads on the transmission lines. Wind and solar power plants are also capable to provide fast frequency response in ramping up falling grid frequency. Grid-forming inverters can also restart a downed grid by providing black start power from inverter-based resources like solar, wind and batteries.

== Electricity transmission and distribution ==
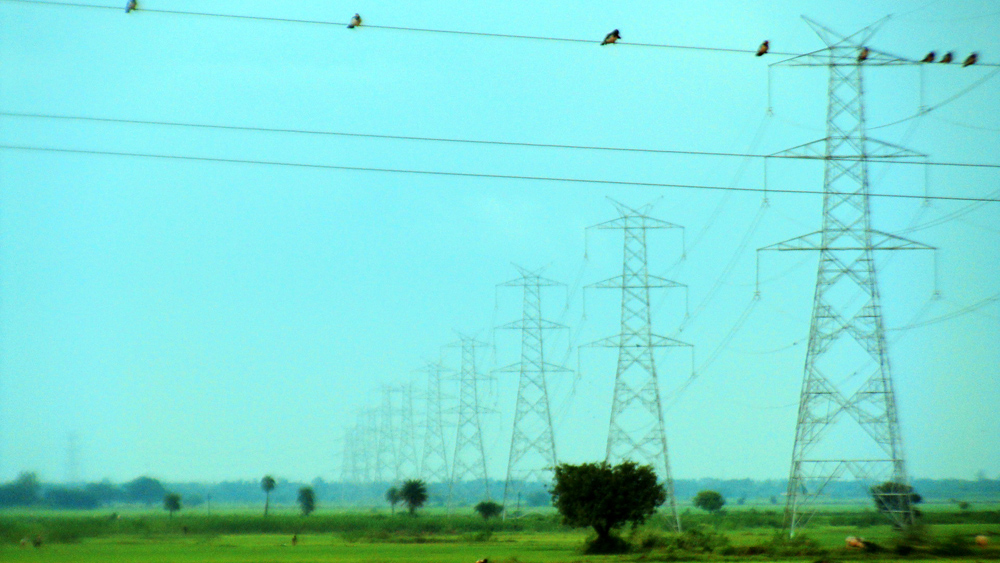
Electricity transmission grid in eastern India

As of 2013, India has a single wide area synchronous grid that covers the entire country except distant islands. As of 31 March 2024, the length of high voltage transmission lines (66 KV & above) is 817,972 circuit kilometers and the length of transmission & distribution lines (below 66 KV) is 14,077,053 circuit kilometers.

Installed transmission lines and distribution capacity (MVA) as of 31 July 2018
Capacity	Substations (MVA)	Transmission lines (circuit km)	c.km / MVA ratio
HVDC ± 220 kV & above	22,500	15,556	0.691
765 kV	197,500	36,673	0.185
400 kV	292,292	173,172	0.707
220 kV	335,696	170,748	0.592
220 kV & above	847,988	396,149	0.467

The total length of high voltage (HV) transmission lines (220 kV and above) would be enough to form a square matrix of area 266 km^{2} (i.e. a square grid 16.3 km on a side, so that on average there is at least one HV line within a distance of 8.15 km) over the entire area of the country. This represents a total of almost 20% more HV transmission lines than that of the United States (322,000 km (200,000 mi) of 230 kV and above). However the Indian grid transmits far less electricity. The installed length of transmission lines of 66 kV and above is 649,833 km (403,788 mi) (on average, there is at least one ≥66 kV transmission line within 4.95 km across the country). The length of secondary transmission lines (400 V and above) is 10,381,226 km (6,450,595 mi) as of 31 March 2018. The spread of total transmission lines (≥400 V) would be sufficient to form a square matrix of area 0.36 km^{2} (i.e. on average, at least one transmission line within 0.31 km distance) over the entire area of the country. In a future grid dominated by decentralized power generation like solar and wind power, unscientific expansion of the electrical grid would yield negative results due to Braess's paradox.

The all-time maximum peak load met was 182,610 MW on 30 May 2019. The maximum achieved demand factor of substations is nearly 60% at the 220 kV level. However, the operational performance of the system is not satisfactory in meeting peak electricity loads. This has led to the initiation of detailed forensic engineering studies, with a plan to make capital investments in a smart grid that maximizes the utility of the existing transmission infrastructure.

The introduction of an availability based tariff (ABT) originally helped to stabilize the Indian transmission grids. However, as the grid transitions to power surplus the ABT has become less useful. The July 2012 blackout, affecting the north of the country, was the largest power grid failure in history as measured by the number of people affected.

India's aggregate transmission and commercial (ATC) losses were nearly 21.35% in 2017–18. This compares unfavorably to the total ATC loss in the electricity sector of the United States, which was only 6.6% out of 4,404 billion kWh electricity supplied during the year 2018. The Indian government set a target of reducing losses to 17.1% by 2017 and to 14.1% by 2022. A high proportion of non-technical losses are caused by illegal tapping of lines, faulty electric meters and fictitious power generation that underestimates actual consumption and also contributes to reduced payment collection.

== Rural electrification ==
As on 28 April 2018, all Indian villages were electrified. India has achieved 100% electrification of all rural and urban households. As of 4 January 2019, 211.88 million rural households are provided with electricity, which is nearly 100% of the 212.65 million total rural households. Up to 4 January 2019, 42.937 million urban households are provided with electricity, which is almost 100% of the 42.941 million total urban households. In urban areas, 88.6% of the households use LPG drastically reducing the use of traditional fuels – fuelwood, agricultural waste and biomass cakes – for cooking and general heating needs.

== See also ==
- Climate change in India
- Electricity sector in India
- Energy in India
- Economics of new nuclear power plants
- Levelised energy cost
- Cost of electricity by source
- Energy returned on energy invested
- Reliance east to west India gas pipeline
- Coal slurry pipeline
- 40,000 MW Yarlung Tsangpo Hydroelectric Project
- Negawatt power
- Water resources in India
- Indian Rivers Inter-link
- Bioeconomy
- Biomass to liquid
- Gas to liquid
- Coal to liquid
- Torrefaction
- Low-carbon economy
- Energy cannibalism
- Fossil fuel phase-out
- Renewable natural gas
- Algae fuel
- Solar power in India
- Wind power in India
- Renewable energy in India
- Index of energy articles
- Index of solar energy articles
- List of energy abbreviations
