= Electricity Regulatory Commissions Act, 1998 =

Act of the Parliament of India

Electricity Regulatory Commissions Act, 1998 was an Act of the Parliament of India, enacted to establish Electricity Regulatory Commissions at the central and state levels. The objective of this Act was to bring transparency, efficiency, and competition to the power sector, which had traditionally been controlled by state electricity boards. Enacted on July 2, 1998, and deemed effective from April 25, 1998, following an ordinance, this Act applied to the whole of India except Jammu and Kashmir. The Act addressed the challenges facing the power sector, such as irrational tariffs, cross-subsidies, and the financial difficulties of state electricity boards amidst increasing demand due to economic liberalization.

== Background ==
The Act was introduced in response to growing inefficiencies, financial losses, and lack of transparency in India's electricity sector, which was dominated by state-controlled electricity boards. It aimed to establish independent electricity regulatory commissions at the central and state levels and to create a uniform regulatory framework for tariff determination, licensing, and promotion of competition in the power sector across India.
