= Electricity Act, 2003 =

Electricity act of government of India

Parliament of India
- Long title: An Act to consolidate the laws relating to generation, transmission, distribution, trading and use of electricity and generally for taking measures conducive to development of electricity industry, promoting competition therein, protecting interest of consumers and supply of electricity to all areas, rationalization of electricity tariff, ensuring transparent policies regarding subsidies, promotion of efficient and environmentally benign policies, constitution of Central Electricity Authority, Regulatory Commissions and establishment of Appellate Tribunal and for matters connected therewith or incidental thereto.
- Citation: Act No. 36 of 2003
- Territorial extent: India
- Assented to: 26 May 2003
- Commenced: 10 June 2003

Amended by
- 2003 and 2007
- Status: In force

The Electricity Act, 2003 is an Act of the Parliament of India enacted to transform the power sector in India.

The act covers major issues involving generation, distribution, transmission and trading in power. While some of the sections have already been enacted and are yielding benefits, there are a few other sections that are yet to be fully enforced till date.

== Background ==
Before the Electricity Act, 2003, the Indian Electricity sector was guided by The Indian Electricity Act, 1910 and The Electricity (Supply) Act, 1948 and the Electricity Regulatory Commission Act, 1998. The generation, distribution and transmission were carried out mainly by the State Electricity Boards in various States. Due to politico-economic situation, the cross-subsidies reached at an unsustainable level. For the purpose of distancing state governments from tariff determination, The Electricity Regulatory Commissions Act was enacted in 1998. So as to reform electricity sector further by participation of private sector and to bring in competition, Electricity Act was enacted in 2003.

With effect from 2 June 2003 India has adopted a new legislation called the Electricity Act 2003, to replace some age-old existing legislation operating in the country. The new act consolidates the position for existing laws and aims to provide for measures conducive to the development of electricity industry in the country. The act has attempted to address certain issues that have slowed reform in the country and consequently has generated new hopes for the electricity industry. This paper reviews the Electricity Act 2003, to highlight how the new features are different from the existing legal provisions and whether these measures have economic rationale.

An act to consolidate the laws relating to generation, transmission, distribution, trading and use of electricity for taking measures conducive to development of electricity industry, promoting competition therein, protecting interest of consumers and supply of electricity to all areas, rationalisation of electricity tariff, ensuring transparent policies regarding subsidies, promotion of efficient and environmentally benign policies, constitution of Central Electricity Authority Regulatory Commissions and establients of Appellate Tribunal for matters therewith or incident thereto.

== Generation ==
The Act delicenses power generation completely (except for all nuclear and hydro-power projects over a certain size). As per the Act, 10 per cent of the power supplied by suppliers and distributors to the consumers has to be generated using renewable and non-conventional sources of energy so that the energy is reliable.

Electricity generation has been made a non-licensed activity and the techno-economic clearance from the Central Electricity Authority (CEA) has been done away with for any power plant, except for hydro-electric power stations above a certain amount of capital investment. This has been provided in section 7 and 8 of the Electricity Act 2003. The generators can sell electricity to any licensees or where allowed by the state regulatory commissions, to consumers directly. The provision of direct sale of electricity by the generators, when and where allowed, would promote more IPP participation in the power generation, as these consumers are more creditworthy and bankable compared to many SEB's. However the act provides for imposition of a surcharge by the regulatory body to compensate for some loss in cross-subsidy revenue to the SEB's due to this direct sale of electricity by generators to the consumers.

The Act delicenses distribution in rural areas and brings in a licensing regime for distribution in urban areas.

However, as per the Act, only 16 states in India have notified what constitutes as rural areas and therefore the rural distribution is yet to be freed up in nearly one third of the country.

== Key features ==
The main features of the act are as follows:

1. Generation is being de-licensed and captive generation freely permitted, i.e. any generating company may establish, operate and maintain a generating station without obtaining a licence under this Act with the only exception that it should comply with the technical standards relating to connectivity with the grid referred to in clause (b) of section 73.
  Note: Hydro-projects, however, need concurrence from the Central Electricity Authority.
2. No person shall
  (a)transmit electricity; or
  (b)distribute electricity; or
  (c)undertake trading in electricity,
  unless he is authorised to do so by a licence issued, exceptions are informed by authorised commissions through notifications.
3. Central Government may, make region-wise demarcation of the country, and, from time to time, make such modifications therein as it may consider necessary for the efficient, economical and integrated transmission and supply of electricity, and in particular to facilitate voluntary inter-connections and co-ordination of facilities for the inter-State, regional and inter-regional generation and transmission of electricity.
  Transmission utility at the central and state level to be a government company with responsibility of planned and coordinated development of transmission network.
4. Open access in transmission with provision for surcharge for taking care of current level of cross-subsidy, with the surcharge being gradually phased out.
5. The state governments are required to unbundle State Electricity Boards. However they may continue with them as distribution licensees and state transmission utilities.
6. Setting up State Electricity Regulatory Commission (SERC) has been made mandatory.
7. An appellate tribunal to hear appeals against the decision of (CERC's) and SERC's.
8. Metering of electricity supplied made mandatory.
9. Provisions related to thefts of electricity made more stringent.
10. Trading as a distinct activity recognised with the safeguard of Regulatory commissions being authorised to fix ceiling on trading margins.
11. For rural and remote areas, stand-alone system for generation and distribution is permitted.
12. Thrust to complete rural electrification and provide for management of rural distribution by panchayat, cooperative societies, NGOs, franchisees etc.
13. Central government to prepare National Electricity Policy and Tariff Policy.
14. Central Electricity Authority (CEA) to prepare National Electricity Plan.

== Role of CEA ==
The role of CEA is limited to policy recommendations, monitoring electricity sector performance, advising the Ministry of power on technical issues, data management/dissemination of the power sector, etc.

Preparation of technical standards for construction of electrical plants, electric lines and connectivity to the grid is the responsibility of CEA as per section 73 (b) of the Electricity Act, 2003. However, as per section 7 of this Act, a generating company may establish, operate and maintain a generating station if it complies with the technical standards only relating to connectivity to the grid as given in clause (b) of section 73. This implies that generating stations need not follow compulsory the CEA technical standards specified for construction of electrical plants and electric lines. Similarly, transmission / distribution licensees need not implement compulsory the standards for construction of electric lines except the Grid Code/ Grid Standards for the operation and maintenance of transmission lines specified by CEA under clause 73 (d) of this Act. Many times, these CEA standards are conservative compromising optimum design features /cost/ utility and also do not give full clarity in selection of the system / sub system capabilities of electrical plants and electric line.

== Left parties opposition ==
Left parties opposed the clauses related to competition in electricity market such as unbundling of Electricity Boards and open access and also had strong objection regarding elimination of cross subsidies. UPA government, in its first tenure agreed for some of the amendments and according clause regarding cross subsidies are amended. In its second tenure, UPA government published a draft amendment of The Electricity Act 2003 with the main intention of separation of retail sale of electricity from distribution business.

== Amendments ==
Several amendments were made after 2003 in the Act. The amendments proposed during 2015 is to make major changes. The important provision is to introduce electricity supply companies who will not own electric lines. The Government says it would attract competition and therefore will cause reduction in price. But those oppose these amendments say that in Indian situation competition can not bring down the cost. Some electricity finance experts are of the opinion that it will weaken the public sector discoms and can damage power sector industry in the country.

Section 25 of the electricity act, 2003 authorises the central government to demarcate the country into regions necessary for the efficient, economical and integrated transmission and supply of electricity, and in particular to facilitate voluntary interconnections and co-ordination of facilities for the inter-State, regional and interregional generation and transmission of electricity. Electricity is listed in the concurrent list (entry 38 of list III). The traditional and unscientific demarcation of the country into five regions (north, south, east, west and north east regions) without giving any valid justification and applying one set of rules for intra region and different set of rules for inter regions in sharing electricity transmission system and transmission losses, etc. is considered discriminating one state from another state. Without the public interest, Constitution does not recognise different set of rules applicable for a group of states except ratified by each of the concerned state under Article 252 of the constitution.

The concept of dividing the country in to regions by clubbing few states, emerged in seventies to envisage pit head super thermal power stations nearer to coal mines and to supply the generated power to far flung areas by high voltage transmission lines. In last forty years, electricity sector in India has grown many folds and the present power consumption in many big states has exceeded the regional level power consumption at that time. Moreover, the electricity generation from other sources such as natural gas, hydro, nuclear, wind, solar, imported coal, etc. has increased substantially and country has achieved decentralisation and diversification with respect to electricity generation and its consumption. The concept of regions is no more useful by treating the states in a region at par and outside the region differently. Many states forming boundary of a region are unable to draw/export cheaper power from adjoining regions/states due to regional bias / differentiation. Also, the electricity grid has transformed into one national grid and the emergence of single grid operation has made practically regional grids obsolete. Each state should be considered as one administrative entity/region/area for power transmission and its losses accounting and its commercial settlement as a part of national grid. Section 25 (provision to create regions) and other related sections of the Electricity Act 2003 & proposed Electricity Bill 2014 are unconstitutional in the absence of its ratification by each state.

Electricity is also being transmitted in circuitous path (ex: north-eastern region exports power to eastern region, eastern region exports power to northern and western regions, western region exports power to northern region and power from northern region is exported back to north-eastern region. Similarly eastern region exports power to western region and western region exports to southern region instead of eastern region directly export all the net power needed by the southern, northern and north-eastern regions.) on daily basis without any economic sense by the central transmission company. Thus regional concept for power generation and transmission has become counter productive.

== Important Judgments on Electricity ==
In a recent ruling, Rajasthan High Court Jaipur bench held that the acts of Jaipur Vidyut Vitran Nigam Limited which is a licensee under section 14 in Jaipur in denying electricity connection and forcing residents to buy electricity from builder are illegal and violation of Article 21 of the constitution of India.

== See also ==
- Electricity sector in India
- Energy law
