= Central Electricity Regulatory Commission =

Indian electricity sector regulator

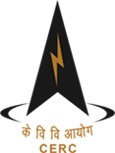

Agency overview
- Formed: 24 July 1998
- Jurisdiction: India
- Headquarters: World Trade Centre Nauroji Nagar, Delhi
- Agency executive: Jishnu Barua, IAS, Chairperson; Ramesh Babu V., Member; Harish Dudani, Member; Ravinder Singh Dhillon, Member
- Parent agency: Ministry of Power
- Website: https://cercind.gov.in/

Central Electricity Regulatory Commission (CERC) is the apex statutory body responsible for regulating the electricity sector at the national level in India. Established under the Electricity Regulatory Commissions Act, 1998, and subsequently governed by the Electricity Act, 2003, the Commission functions as an independent regulator to oversee the generation, transmission and inter-state trading of electricity. It also has a quasi-judicial status

Its key responsibilities include determining tariffs for central generating stations and inter-state transmission systems, promoting competition and efficiency in the power sector, adjudicating disputes, and ensuring the development of a reliable, transparent, and sustainable electricity market in the country.

== History ==
On 2 July 1998, recognizing the needs for reforms in the electricity sector nationwide, the Government of India moved forward to enact the Electricity Regulatory Commission Act of 1998, which mandated the creation of the Central Electricity Regulation Commission with the charge of setting the tariff of centrally owned or controlled generation companies. The Ministry of Power, India, has published the Electricity Regulatory Commissions Act, 1998. Apart from CERC, the act also introduced a provision for the states to create the State Electricity Regulation Commission (SERC) along with the power to set the tariffs without having to enact separate state laws.

Mr.S.L.Rao was the first Chairman of CERC (1998–2001).

During March 2004, Indian Institute of Management Ahmedabad (IIM-A) called for the merger of the Central Electricity Authority (CEA) and Central Electricity Regulatory Commission (CERC) on the grounds that technical and economic regulatory functions need to be carried out in close coordination. Even though the Electricity Act, 2003 envisages separate identity for CERC and CEA, and there is a necessity for separation in the short run, the two regulators should be merged eventually, as there are substantial synergies between them. But Ministry of Power rejected IIM-A's recommendations in this regard and observed that the tariff fixation is in the exclusive domain of electricity regulatory commissions (ERCs), and no other entity or government has any role in this regard.

On 1 September 2009, CERC has entered into a Memorandum of Understanding (MoU) with world-renowned USA's Federal Energy Regulatory Commission for Development and regulatory oversight of Power market, Grid Reliability, Energy Efficiency, Transmission and Distribution services in India.

== Obligations ==
- Formulate an efficient tariff setting mechanism, which ensures speedy and time bound disposal of tariff petitions, promotes competition, economy, and efficiency in the pricing of bulk power and transmission services, and ensures minimal cost investments.
- The regulation of tariffs of central generating stations.
- The regulation of tariffs of electric power generated and sold across states in a composite package.
- The regulation of interstate transmission tariffs, and facilitation of open access in interstate transmission.
- To issue licences to persons to function as transmission licensees and electricity traders with respect to their interstate operations.
- To adjudicate disputes involving generating companies or transmission licensees.
- To Improve the operations and management of the regional transmission systems through Indian Electricity Grid Code (IEGC), Availability Based Tariff (ABT), etc.
- To specify and enforce the standards with respect to quality, continuity, and reliability of service by licensees.
- To promote the development of the power market & fix the trading margin in the interstate trading of electricity, if considered necessary.
- To discharge such other functions as may be assigned under the Act.

=== Advisory functions ===
- Formulation of National Electricity Policy and Tariff Policy.
- Promotion of competition, efficiency, and economy in the activities of the electricity industry.
- Promotion of investment in electricity industry.
- Any other matter referred to the Central Commission by the Central Government.

== Chairpersons ==
No.	Name	Tenure	
1	Prof. S. L. Rao	03.08.1998	21.01.2001
2	Mr. A. K. Basu	04.04.2002	23.03.2007
3	Dr Pramod Deo	09.06.2008	08.06.2013
4	Mr. Gireesh B. Pradhan	22.10.2013	17.12.2017
5	Mr. P. K Pujari	01.02.2018	11.06.2022
6	Mr. Jishnu Barua	02.03.2023	Incumbent

== Members ==
- Mr. A. R. Ramanathan (August, 1988 to December, 2000)
- Mr. D. P. Sinha ( August 1988 to November, 2002)
- Mr. G. S. Rajamani (August, 1998 to July, 2003)
- Mr. K. N. Sinha (May, 2001 to May, 2006)
- Mr Bhanu Bhushan (February, 2004 – February, 2009)
- Mr A. H. Jung (February, 2005 to February, 2007)
- Mr. R. Krishnamoorthy (May, 2007 to January, 2010)
- Mr. S. Jayaraman (September, 2008 to May, 2013)
- Mr. V. S. Verma (February, 2009 to February, 2014)
- Mr. M. Deena Dayalan (March, 2010 to February, 2015)
- Mr. A. K. Singhal (October, 2013 to October, 2018)
- Mr. A. S. Bakshi (August, 2014 to July, 2018)
- Dr. M. K Iyer (August, 2015 to February, 2020)
- Mr. I. S. Jha (January, 2019 to January, 2024)
- Mr. Arun Goyal (April, 2020 to August, 2024)
- Mr. Pravas Kumar Singh(February, 2021 to May,2024)
- Mr. Ramesh Babu V.(May, 2024 to present)
- Mr.Harish Dudani (August,2024 to present)
- Mr.Ravinder Singh Dhillon (Feb, 2025 to present)

== Important advice to government ==
1. Regarding time frame for tariff based competitive bidding (01-06-2010)
2. Regarding the Open Access (18-05-2010)
3. Regarding the installation of dedicated transmission lines (14-05-2010)
4. Regarding the issues related to regulation of electricity forward contracts and electricity derivatives markets (19-02-2010).
5. Regarding the matter of proposed amendment to Tariff Policy (14-1-2010)
6. Regarding the modification in Standard Bidding Document for development of transmission lines through competitive bidding (13-1-2010)
7. Regarding the issues relating to regulation of electricity forward contracts and electricity derivatives markets (18-11-2009)
8. Regarding the guidelines and Standard Bidding Documents for tariff based competitive bidding for procuring transmission services (12-11-2009)
9. Regarding ring-fencing of State Load Despatch Centers (11-08-2009).
10. Regarding the competitive procurement of transmission Services (06-05-2009)
11. Regarding order of the various State Governments (27-04-2009)
12. Regarding the rates of depreciation to be notified under the Companies Act. (20-04-2009)
13. Regarding designating electricity trader by Central Government for import of electricity from other countries (13-04-2009)
14. Regarding the order of the Karnataka under Section 11 of the electricity act, 2003(5-02-2009)
15. Regarding the measures for restricting the pricing of electricity in short-term market (22-12-2008)

== Regulatory independence ==
Regulatory Independence
Selection Process	Selection of Chairman/members by Government on advice of selection committee
Qualifying Criteria	Prescribed
Disqualifying Criteria	Prescribed
Removal Criteria & Procedure	Criteria Laid down. Removal with advice from Supreme Court of India
Tenure	5 Years. Not eligible for re-appointment
Staff Appointment	Can appoint secretary and determine the number, nature and Categories of other staff but with government approval.
Staff Salary	Staff Salary can be determined with the approval of government by regulations
Finance	Expenses to be charged on Consolidated Fund of India
Relationship with government	Quasi-Judicial body, but subject to policy direction by government of India.

== Evolution of Electricity Tariff & Role of CERC ==
=== Single part tariff ===
A system of single-part tariffs was in vogue in India for pricing of thermal power, prior to 1992. The single-part tariff for a station was calculated to cover both the fixed cost as well as the variable (energy) cost at a certain (normative) generation level.

Demerit:

1. Energy production above the normative generation level yielded additional revenue. i.e., a surplus over the fixed and variable cost of the station.
2. The incentive and disincentive for power generation got linearly linked to the annual Plant Load Factor (PLF) of the generating station.

=== Two part tariff for Generation as per K.P. Rao Committee (1992) ===
Finding that the single-part tariff, particularly for Central generating stations, was conducive neither to economic generation of power as per merit-order, nor to satisfactory operation of the regional grids, the government of India adopted in 1992 a two-part tariff formula for NTPC stations based on the recommendations of the KP Rao Committee.

Recognizing that there would be no motivation on the part of NTPC (Central generating stations) to maintain a high level of efficiency and availability if it was paid the full fixed cost irrespective of level of generation and variable cost for the quantum of energy actually generated, the K.P. Rao Committee had recommended a scheme of incentive/disincentive, as a variant of a simple two-part tariff. The scheme provided for linking of incentive and disincentive with Plant Load Factor (PLF) plus deemed generation, which in effect is Plant availability.

=== Evolution of Availability Based Tariff (ABT) ===
The serious problems of regional grid operation however continued even after 1992. This was because the K.P. Rao Committee had been able to tackle only one end; the Central generation side. Overdrawals by some State Electricity Board's during peak-load hours and under-drawals during off-peak hours continued unabated, causing serious frequency excursions and perpetual operational/commercial disputes.

In the year 1994, M/s ECC of USA were commissioned under a grant from the Asian Development Bank to undertake a comprehensive study of the Indian power system and recommend a suitable tariff structure. ECC submitted their report in February, 1994, recommending Availability Tariff for generating stations, which was accepted in principle by GOI in November, 1994. A National Task Force (NTF) was constituted by the Ministry of Power in February, 1995 to oversee the implementation of ECC's recommendations. Based on NTF deliberations between 1995 and 1998, Ministry of Power had crystallized the formulation for the so-called Availability-based tariff (ABT).

With the spirit of the Electricity Regulatory Commissions Act 1998 and consequent upon transfer of relevant powers vested under section 43 A (2) of the Electricity (Supply) Act 1948 to the CERC with effect from 15 May 1999, GOI forwarded the above draft ABT notification to CERC vide OM dated 31.5.1999 for finalization after due deliberation. The draft notification was then issued through a public notice and comments/objections were invited. The Commission in July 1999 held detailed hearings on the above. The ABT order dated 4 January 2000 of the Commission departs significantly from the draft notification as also from the prevailing tariff design

== Standard Tariff Model ==
Tariff for supply of electricity shall comprise two parts:

1. Fixed or Capacity Charges (For recovery of Annual Fixed Cost)
2. Energy or Variable Charges (For recovery of Primary Fuel Cost wherever applicable)

The annual fixed cost (AFC) of a generating station or a transmission system shall consist of the following components

1. Return on equity (RoE);
2. Interest on loan capital;
3. Depreciation;
4. Interest on Working capital;
5. Operation and maintenance expenses;
6. Cost of secondary fuel oil (for Coal-based & Lignite fired generating stations);
7. Special allowance for renovation and modernisation or separate compensation allowance, wherever applicable.

The Energy charge shall cover the primary fuel cost and limestone consumption cost (where applicable), and shall be payable by every beneficiary for the total energy scheduled to be supplied to such beneficiary with fuel and limestone price adjustment

== Relation with Other Power Sector Bodies (MoP, CEA, Appellate Tribunal) ==
=== Appellate Tribunal and CERC ===
Appellate Tribunal for Electricity has been established by Central Government for those who are not satisfied with the Central Electricity Regulatory Commission order or with a state. The Tribunal has the authority to overrule or amend that order, just like the Income-Tax tribunal or the Central Administrative Tribunal. The tribunal has to be approached within 45 days of the aggrieved person from getting the order.

=== Central Electricity Authority (CEA) and CERC ===
Since 1 April 1999 CEA has entrusted CERC with the task of regulating power tariffs of central government power utilities, inter-state generating companies, inter-state transmission tariffs. Section −76 of Electricity Act, 2003 stipulates that CERC shall consist of a Chairperson and three other Members. And one of the CERC members (Ex-Officio) has to be Chairman of CEA.
In Indian Power Sector, CEA takes care of:

1. Planning Regulation where power demand and supply gap has to be regulated.
2. Construction regulation where Construction of thermal-, hydro-, gas-based power plants and power systems are regulated in the right manner.

Whereas CERC take care of third aspect of power sector regulation -

3.Tariff regulation, a purely economic exercise.

National electricity policy is normally formulated in consultation with and taking into account the views of the Central Electricity Regulatory Commission (CERC), Central Electricity Authority (CEA), and state governments.

=== SERC and CERC ===
CERC and State Electricity Regulatory Commission (SERC) are the two electricity regulators – one operating at the central level and the other at various state levels. CERC's primary function was to regulate the tariffs of central generating stations as well as for all interstate generation, transmission and supply of power. Whereas SERC's primary function was to determine bulk and retail tariffs to be charged to customers, regulate the operations of intrastate transmission, including those of the State Load Despatch Center (SLDC). During Parliamentary Standing Committee on Energy in the year 2001, SERC being established in states, for formulating standards relating to quality, continuity and reliability of service for the electricity industry have failed in their efforts. There was a proposal of having benches of the Central Electricity Regulatory Commission (CERC) in five to six locations instead of having a SERC in each state, but the Committee that has rejected the proposal stating it was not possible unless states were willing to accept such a proposal.

=== Ministry of Power and CERC ===
MoP entrusts CERC for providing escalation rate for coal and gas, inflation rate based on WPI and CPI, discount rate, and dollar-rupee exchange variation rate for the purpose tariff determination.

=== Power Exchange Companies and CERC ===
Central Electricity Regulatory Commission (CERC) has issued the Power Market Regulations, 2010 which will govern transactions related to ‘'Energy trading'’ by companies like Indian Energy Exchange (IEX), Power Exchange India (PXI), National Power Exchange (NPX) in various contracts related to electricity. The regulations have been issued by the CERC in exercise of its powers under section 66 of the Electricity Act, 2003, which is aimed at taking measures conducive to development of the electricity industry, promoting competition therein, protecting interest of consumers and enhancing supply of electricity.

== Important Regulations / Policy Framework ==
1999

1. 26-04-99, Conduct of Business Regulation-1999 8/1/99-CERC dt.23-04-99 Notification
2. 26-11-99, Conduct of Business Regulation-1999 8/1/99-CERC dt.24-11-99 Notification

2000

1. 10-05-00, Conduct of Business Regulation (First Amendment) 8/1(1)/99-CERC dt 28-04-00 Notification
2. 25-05-00, Filing of Annual Report by Thermal Generating Companies L-7/20(1)/99-CERC dt.28-04-00
3. 15-07-00, Filing of Annual Report by Transmission Utility L-7/20(1)/99-CERC dt.10-07-00

2001

1. 26-03-01, Terms and conditions of Tariff L-25(1)/2001-CERC dt.26-03-01
2. 24-09-01, Terms and conditions of Tariff L-25(1)/2001-CERC dt.21-09-01

2002

1. 11-07-02, Terms and Condition of tariff Regulation-First Amendment-2002

2003

1. 02-06-03, Terms and Conditions of Tariff (Second Amendment) Regulation-2003

2004

1. 29-03-04, CERC Notification – CERC (Terms and Conditions of Tariff) Regulations, 2004
2. 09-09-04, CERC Notification – CERC (Terms and Conditions of Tariff) (First Amendment) Regulations, 2004
3. 06-02-04, CERC Notification – CERC (Open Access in Inter-State Transmission) Regulations, 2004

2005

1. 11-08-05, CERC Notification – CERC (Terms and Conditions of Tariff)(first Amendment) Regulations, 2005
2. 17-11-05, ERC Medical Regulations – Nov 2005
3. 23-02-05, CERC Notification – CERC (Open Access in inter-state Transmission)(First Amendment) Regulations, 2005

2006

1. 01-06-06, CERC Notification – CERC (Terms and Conditions of Tariff)(First Amendment) Regulations, 2006

2007

1. 13-03-07, CERC Notification – CERC (Terms & Conditions of Tariff)(Amendment) Regulations, 2007

2008

1. 07-02-08, CERC Notification – CERC (Open Access in inter-State Transmission) Regulations, 2008

2009

1. 28-05-09, CERC (Conduct of Business) (Amendment) Regulations, 2009
2. 02-06-09, ERC (Procedure, Terms & Conditions for grant of Transmission Licence & other related matters) Regulations, 2009.
3. 20-01-09, Terms and Conditions of Tariff, Regulations for 2009–14
4. 10-08-09, CERC Grant of Connectivity, LTOA & MTOA in inter-State Transmission related matters, 2009
5. 24-02-09, Procedure, Terms and Conditions for grant of trading licence and other related matters Regulations, 2009
6. 26-09-09, Fees and charges of Regional Load Despatch Centre and other related matters Regulations, 2009
7. 17-09-09, ERC Tariff Regulations for Renewable Energy Sources Regulations, 2009
8. 24-12-09, Measures to relieve congestion in real time operation Regulations, 2009

2010

1. 26-05-10, Procedure, Terms & Conditions for grant of Transmission License & other related matters (Amendment) Regulations, 2010
2. 07-06-10, Procedure, Terms & Conditions for grant of trading license and other related matters (First Amendment) Regulations, 2010.
3. 28-04-10, Indian Electricity Grid Code Regulations, 2010
4. 28-04-10, CERC Unscheduled Interchange charges and related matters (Amendment) Regulations, 2010
5. 21-01-10, Fixation of Trading Margin Regulations, 2010
6. 21-01-10, Power Market Regulations, 2010
7. 16-04-10, Procedures for calculating the expected revenue from tariffs & charges Regulations, 2010
8. 31-06-10, Grant of Regulatory Approval for execution of Inter-State Transmission Scheme to CTU Regulations, 2010
9. 15-06-10, CERC (Sharing of Inter State Transmission Charges and Losses) Regulations, 2010.

== See also ==
- Central Electricity Authority (India)
- Ministry of Power
- Electricity Act 2003
- Energy policy of India
- Electricity sector in India
- Maharashtra Electricity Regulatory Commission
