= BEE Star Label =

Indian government program

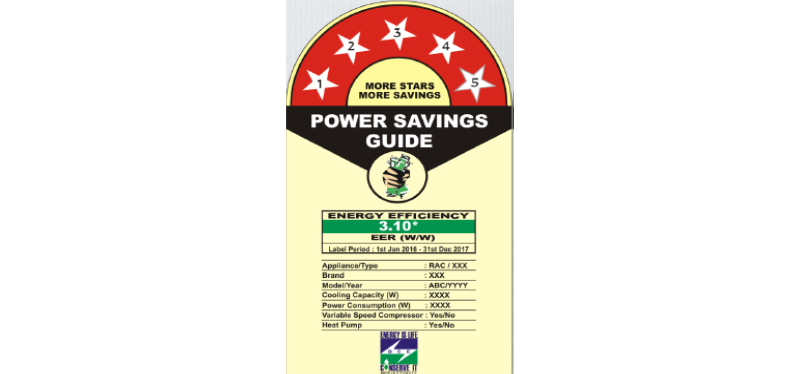
- The BEE Star Label can be found on electrical appliances sold in India
- Founded: May 1, 2006; 19 years ago
- Area served: India
- Website: www.beestarlabel.com

BEE Star Label is a program run by the Indian government's Bureau of Energy Efficiency under Ministry of Power that promotes energy efficiency. The program provides information on the energy consumption of products and devices using different standardized methods. The program for rating electrical appliances started in May, 2006. The labeling program now covers a wide range of electrical appliances like Air Conditioner, Ceiling Fan, Colour Television, Computer, Refrigerator & Freezers, Distribution Transformer, Domestic Gas Stove, Industrial Motor, Pump, Water Heater, Washing Machine, Ballast, Solid State Inverter, Office Automation Products, Diesel Generator Set, LED Lamps, Microwave Oven and Air Compressors.

== Methodology ==
The process for determining star ratings differs between various categories. For instance, the BEE had announced in 2016 that it would be switching to ISEER (Indian Seasonal Energy Efficiency Ratio) to calculate star ratings for air conditioners. This is an evolution of the SEER method used in the US. ISEER allows manufacturers to make more efficient air conditioners for the Indian climate conditions.

== See also ==
- Energy Star
- European Union energy label
