= Energy Efficiency Services Limited =

Indian energy organisation

Energy Efficiency Services Limited (EESL)
- Type of project: Energy efficiency
- Location: Sector-16A, Film City, Noida, Uttar Pradesh - 201301
- Country: India
- Ministry: Ministry of Power
- Key people: Akhilesh Kumar Dixit (Chief Executive Officer)
- Established: 10 December 2009; 16 years ago
- Website: eeslindia.org

Energy Efficiency Services Limited is a joint venture of state-run power companies, responsible for implementation of the Unnat Jyoti by Affordable LEDs for All scheme, formerly known as the Domestic Efficient Lighting Programme. It has reduced the prices of LED bulbs by 75%.
