= National hydrogen energy road map =

Energy program in India

The National Hydrogen Energy Road Map (NHERM) is a program in India initiated by the National Hydrogen Energy Board (NHEB) in 2003 and approved in 2006 for bridging the technological gaps in different areas of hydrogen energy, including its production, storage, transportation and delivery, applications, safety, codes and standards and capacity building for the period up to 2020. The program is under direction of the Ministry of New and Renewable Energy (MNRE).

The project aims to reduce India's dependence on the import of petroleum products, promote the use of diverse, domestic, and sustainable new and renewable energy sources; to provide electricity to remote, far‐flung rural and other electricity deficient areas and promote use of hydrogen as a fuel for transport and power generation; to reduce carbon emissions from energy production and consumption, to increase reliability and efficiency of electricity generation; to generate 1000 MW electricity using fuel cells by 2020 and 1 Million vehicles running on Hydrogen based IC Engines and fuel cells by 2020.

== See also ==
- Hydrogen economy in India
- Hydrogen economy
- Electricity sector in India
- Renewable energy in India
