= Electricity sector in India =

Electricity sector of India
Data
- Electricity coverage: 100%
- Continuity of supply: Urban- 23.4 hr; Rural- 22.6 hr (2023-24)
- Average electricity use: 1,460 kWh per capita (FY 2024-25)
- Transmission & Distribution losses: 17.63% (FY 2023-24)

Institutions
- Responsibility for regulation: CERC, SERC
- Responsibility for policy-setting: Ministry of Power

India is the third-largest producer and consumer of electricity after China and the United States, with about 6-7% share of global electricity generation. Consumption has been growing at a rate of 5.5% annually between FY 2015-2024. The country generated 2059.3 TWh in FY 2024-25, of which 23% came from non-fossil sources.

Electricity in India is generated by both public and private sector utilities, transmitted through a unified national grid, and distributed primarily by state-owned distribution companies (DISCOMs).

India Electricity Flow (TWh) in FY 2023-24

The sector has undergone significant reforms since the Electricity Act of 2003, which de-licensed generation and distribution, introduced open access in transmission, phased open access in distribution, and mandated regulation at state level. Despite rapid growth in generation and transmission capacity, the distribution segment continues to face financial stress due to high technical and commercial losses.

The sector emitted 1234.2 million tonnes of CO2 in FY 2024-25. As part of its commitment to achieve net-zero emissions by 2070, India plans to install 500 GW of non-fossil fuel capacity by 2030. Emissions are estimated to drop to 1114 MT by 2030.

== History ==
Electricity was first introduced in India during British rule in 1879 with the demonstration of electric light in Kolkata, followed by the country's first hydroelectric power station at Darjeeling in 1897 and first coal power plant at Kolkata in 1899. Electricity supply was largely developed by private companies serving urban centers and industries.

After independence in 1947, the Electricity (Supply) Act of 1948 established the Central Electricity Authority (CEA) for planning at central level and State Electricity Boards (SEBs) at state level. SEBs oversaw generation, transmission, and distribution within each state. The sector expanded rapidly through successive Five-Year Plans, with coal and large hydroelectric projects forming the backbone of India's power system.

Regional Grids

However, not every state was rich in coal or hydro resources. This led them to depend on diesel generators. In 1960s, regional grid was conceptualized to supplement power from neighboring states.

By the 1970s, REC was established to finance rural electrification. Generation was not able to keep up with growing demand. This, along with the oil price shocks led the central government to nationalize coal mines and establish CIL, NTPC and NHPC.

In the 1980s, MNRE was established to explore non-conventional energy sources. Rural electrification accelerated. However, due to votebank politics by state governments, tariffs were kept low which strained their finances. In order to further develop the sector, PFC was established for financing needs.

By the 1990s, the idea of a national grid was conceptualized and led to the establishment of PGCIL. The 1991 economic liberalization led to policy reforms. It allowed private participation in generation (via licenses) and the Electricity Regulatory Commissions Act, 1998 created independent regulators at central (CERC) and state level (SERC).

Generation trend - sector wise

In the 2000s, the Electricity Act, 2003 consolidated prior legislation, mandated the unbundling of SEBs. Generation and distribution was de-licensed to encourage competition, and open access was introduced in transmission.

In the 2010s, all the five regional grids were fully synchronized to form a single national grid. Large-scale electrification programmes such as DDUGJY and Saubhagya extended electricity access to nearly all households. India also pursued renewable energy deployment goals.

In the 2020s, the nation achieved 100% household electrification, opened nuclear power to private sector, while continuing to expand its generation capacity, with renewables making up about 87% of total additions between FY 2020-21 and FY 2025-26.

== Generation ==
India is the third-largest producer of electricity in the world. The country's utilities and captive plants generated 2059.3 TWh in FY 2024-25, with non fossil sources accounting for 23%.

In June 2025, India achieved its target of 50% non-fossil installed capacity, five years ahead of its 2030 Paris Agreement commitment. It later set the target to install 500 GW of non-fossil installed capacity by 2030.

Below tables compiles installed capacity and generation data for recent years. Note:

- Coal includes lignite.
- Hydro includes both large and small hydro.
- Bio includes biomass, bagasse, and waste to energy.

Cumulative installed capacity (GW)
Financial year	Utility									Captive							
Financial year	Coal	Diesel	Gas	Nuclear	Hydro	Bio	Wind	Solar	Total	Coal	Diesel	Gas	Hydro	Bio	Wind	Solar	Total
2021-22	210.7	0.5	24.9	6.8	51.5	10.7	40.4	54	399.5	45.3	18.7	5.7	0.1		3.2	3.8	76.7
2022-23	211.9	0.6	24.8	6.8	51.8	10.8	42.6	66.8	416.1	46.8	18.1	6.4	0.1	0.1	3.5	3.5	78.4
2023-24	217.6	0.6	25	8.2	51.9	10.9	45.9	81.8	442.0	46.1	19.6	6.2	0.1	0.2	3.7	4.5	80.9
2024-25	221.8	0.6	24.5	8.2	52.8	11.6	50	105.6	475.2	46.5	19.7	6.3	0.1	9.1			81.7
2025-26	228.6	0.6	20.1	8.8	56.6	11.7	56.1	150.3	532.7								

Gross Generation (TWh)
Financial Year	Utility									Captive							
Financial Year	Coal	Diesel	Gas	Nuclear	Hydro	Bio	Wind	Solar	Total	Coal	Diesel	Gas	Hydro	Bio	Wind	Solar	Total
2021-22	1078.6	0.2	36.0	47.1	162.1	18.3	68.6	73.4	1484.5	179.2	2.1	20.8	0.4		4.0	2.8	209.3
2022-23	1182.1	0.4	23.9	45.9	173.3	18.6	71.8	102.0	1617.9	179.8	2.0	21.1	0.3	0.2	4.8	3.7	211.9
2023-24	1294.9	0.4	31.3	47.9	143.5	17.0	83.4	116.0	1734.3	183.1	10.2	21.7	0.3	0.3	4.8	3.6	223.9
2024-25	1331.6	0.4	31.3	56.6	160.2	15.9	83.3	144.2	1824.2	186.9	12.0	23.0	0.4	12.8			235.1
2025-26	1280.7	0.4	26.0	55.2	179.2	17.1	106.7	174.8	1840.1								

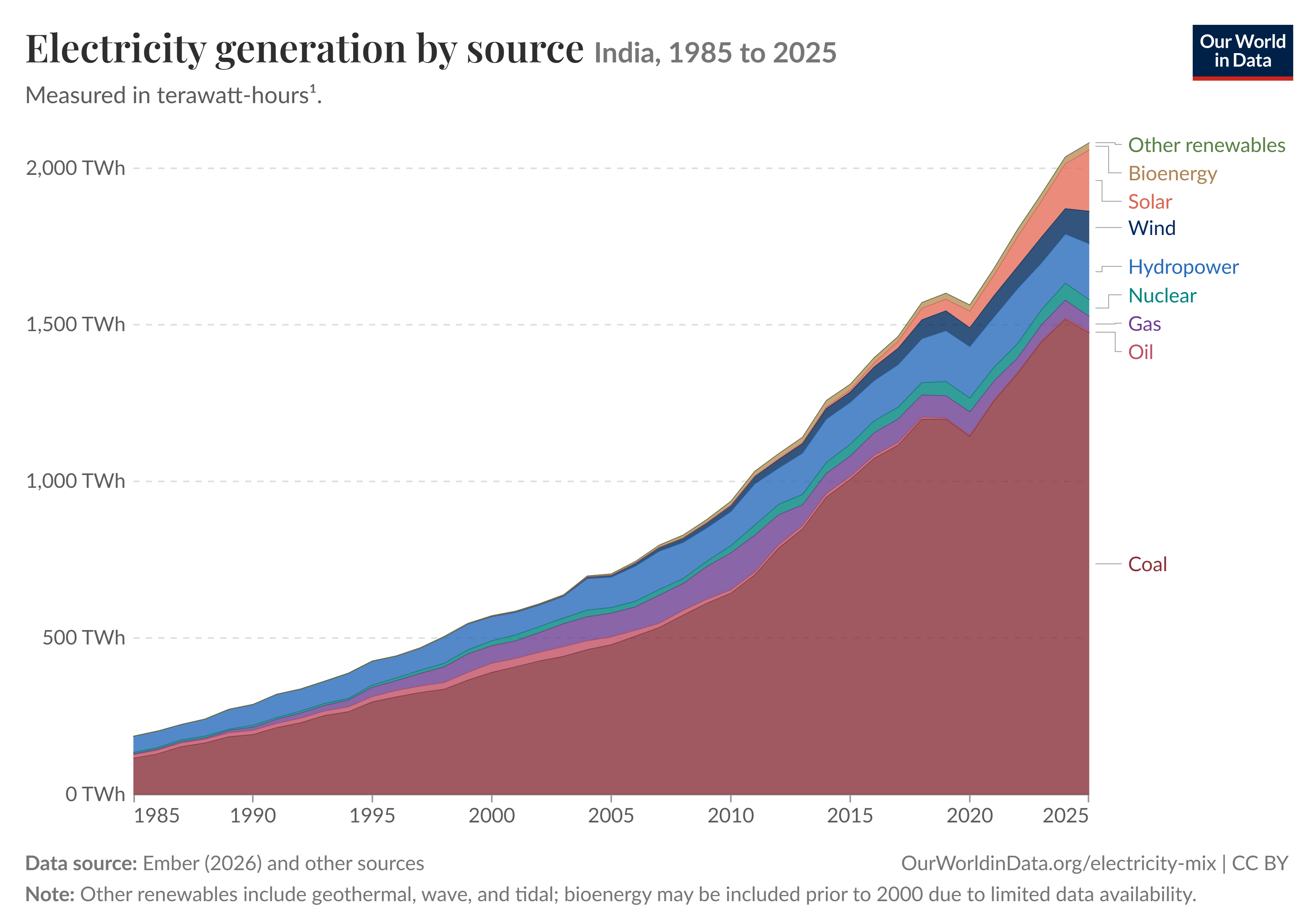
Electricity Generation by Source

Installed Capacity

=== Sources ===
==== Fossil fuels ====
India has huge coal reserves, about an estimated 400.7 billion tonnes as of Apr, 2025 and as such it contributes a major share in electricity generation (typically 73%). The sector consumed 906.1 million tonnes of coal in FY 2025-26. Coal would remain a major source of generation in future, with likely peaking between 2030-2035.

Diesel-based generation plays a negligible role, used mainly for captive or emergency power. Utilization of gas plants has been limited due to low domestic availability and high prices of imported LNG.

==== Nuclear power ====
India has modest uranium reserves, about 325,000 tonnes, but has the largest thorium reserves in the world, around 457,000 - 508,000 tonnes. In order to leverage thorium's potential, the country's nuclear power programme is based on a three-stage strategy where it plans on building up a larger fissile inventory by:

- Using natural uranium (0.7% U-235) in PHWRs and 3-5% enriched uranium in LWRs to make Pu-239
- Using Pu-239 to irradiate thorium (Th-232) into U-233 via Fast Breeder Reactors

It would then deploy thorium-based reactors operating on a self-sustaining uranium-233 fuel cycle.

The nation's fleet is operated by the state-owned NPCIL. The installed capacity is projected to reach 22.48 GW by 2031–32, and is aiming to develop at least five indigenously designed and operational SMRs by 2033. India opened the sector to private ownership in Dec 2025, with a vision of expanding installed capacity to 100 GW by 2047.

==== Renewable energy ====
Solar is the fastest-growing segment of the sector. India has about 10,830 GW of total solar PV potential, with around 3343 GW from ground-mounted solar PV. Development started in 2010s through bundling, Viability Gap Funding, until global prices of solar PV collapsed steeply. As on March 2026, large parks (ground-mounted) make up about 76% of installed solar capacity. India has very limited domestic production of energy-intensive polysilicon and ingots / wafers, so, it assembles Chinese-imported solar cells to make modules / panels. As on March 2026, domestic manufacturing capacity of solar cell and module is around 27 GW and 172 GW respectively. In order to indigenise its supply chain, India has mandated use of domestic cells for all solar projects from Jan 2027.

Wind power generation began in 1990s. With an estimated potential of 1164 GW at 150m above ground, the segment has transitioned from early feed-in tariff mechanism to competitive bidding after 2017. This drove down tariffs, but also reduced project profitability, slowing down further capacity additions. The government plans on reviving the segment by tackling long-standing challenges such as land acquisition bottlenecks and inadequate grid connectivity, and setting a 100 GW installed capacity target for 2030. As on March 2026, India has 24 GW of turbine manufacturing capacity with 70-80% indigenisation across components.

Hydropower is India's oldest sources of large-scale electricity generation. With 133.4 GW of potential (for >25 MW plants), 47% is concentrated in the Brahmaputra basin alone. Almost, all of which remains untapped due to difficult terrain, geological risks, environmental concerns, and high project costs. In recent years, the role of hydropower has expanded beyond electricity generation, with pumped-storage projects being promoted to provide energy storage and grid balancing support as solar and wind capacity increases.

Other renewable sources make up a small share (~6%) of total renewable generation. Small hydro harnesses the energy of rivers and canals, particularly in hilly and remote regions. Estimated potential is around 21.1 GW, with only 5.1 GW installed, as of March 2026. 1.5 GW of capacity is further planned between FY 2026-27 to FY 2030-31. Bagasse based co-generation in sugar mills export surplus captive power to the grid. India has mandated 5% agro residue based biomass pellets for co-generation with coal plants, by weight, from FY 2024-25. Waste-to-energy plants utilize municipal solid waste, sewage, and other biodegradable wastes.

== Storage ==
Renewable sources of electricity such as solar and wind are intermittent and only available during certain parts of the day. Energy storage systems (ESS) absorb the surplus, and provide the same during periods of low generation, enabling round-the-clock supply of low-carbon electricity. Pumped-Storage Hydropower (PSH) and Battery ESS (BESS) are the most widespread and commercially viable means of energy storage.

India has identified a potential PSH of 290.4 GW and has an installed capacity of 7.2 GW as of FY 2025-26. It plans to install 100 GW by FY 2035-36.

India has 0.5 GW / 1.1 GWh of installed BESS as of FY 2025-26. The government is supporting development of 43.8 GWh of BESS through Viability Gap Funding.

There has been renewed interest in solar thermal because of its energy storage properties. As of 2025, India has an installed capacity of just 329.5 MW of solar thermal, out of which only 101 MW was operational. Other storage technologies like Flywheel Energy Storage, Compressed Air Storage, Green Hydrogen, etc. are in nascent stages of development.

== Transmission and distribution ==
India has one of the world's largest interconnected electricity transmission and distribution (T&D) systems. The transmission network facilitates long-distance bulk power transfer, typically using 400kV, 765 kV AC and ±500 kV, ±800 kV HVDC to minimize resistive losses. The national grid, which was synchronized in 2013, consists of:

- Inter-State Transmission System (ISTS): Largely managed by Central Transmission Utility (wholly owned by PowerGrid), with private participation through Tariff Based Competitive Bidding route, with a few exceptions.
- Intra-state Transmission System (Intra-STS): Managed by State Transmission Utility of each state. Projects are developed by State Government through competitive bidding process for projects costing above a threshold limit which are decided by the SERCs.

India - AT&C trend

Voltages are progressively reduced to 220kV, 132kV, 66kV, 33kV, 11kV, 6.6kV for distribution. The segment is managed by state-owned DISCOMs, which are facing:

- High aggregate technical and commercial (AT&C) losses, and
- A gap between average cost of supply (ACS) and average revenue realized (ARR)

As such, distribution remains the most financially stressed part of the sector.

The Government launched several initiatives to improve the operational efficiency and financial health of DISCOMs:

- Integrated Power Development Scheme (IPDS): For strengthening and reducing losses through metering and IT enablement
- Ujjwal DISCOM Assurance Yojana (UDAY): Takeover of debt by State Governments
- Revamped Distribution Sector Scheme (RDSS): Result-linked financial assistance and roll-out of smart meters

Unaccounted losses from transmission and distribution was 288.9 TWh for FY 2023-24, about 17.63% of total generation.

Total energy sold by the DISCOMs in FY 2024-25 was 1423 TWh. Below tables compiles the performance of 65 out of total 72 DISCOMs.

Overview of DISCOMs performance
Key parameters	Unit	FY 2024-25
Energy Sold by participating DISCOMs	TWh	1334.9
Profit with tariff subsidy received excluding regulatory income & UDAY grant	INR crore	-11270
Profit with tariff subsidy received including regulatory income & UDAY grant	INR crore	41
ACS-ARR gap (tariff subsidy received) including regulatory income & UDAY grant	Rs/kWh	-0.01
ACS-ARR gap (tariff subsidy received) excluding regulatory income & UDAY grant	Rs/kWh	0.06
Billing efficiency	%	87.59
Collection efficiency	%	97.00
AT&C loss	%	15.04
Outstanding debt	INR crore	726378
Accumulated losses	INR crore	647210

== Consumption ==
Electricity consumption by sector

Electricity consumption by sector - trend

India consumed a total electrical energy of 1540.6 TWh in FY 2023-24, with a per capita consumption of 1400 kWh. As of May 2026, India met a peak demand of 270.82 GW on May 21, driven by cooling needs due to intense and widespread heatwave conditions across the nation.

Electricity consumption (in TWh)
	FY 2023-24	FY 2024-25
Industrial	640.6	655.6
Residential	369.1	408.5
Agriculture	275.5	260.3
Commercial	128.6	135.2
Others	92.9	128.9
Railway traction	33.9	34.5
Total	1540.6	1623
Per capita (kWh)	1400	1460

Per capita consumption

=== Industrial ===
The industrial sector encompasses manufacturing (automobiles, textiles, steel, cement), chemicals, mining, and construction. Energy-intensive industries like steel, aluminum, and cement contribute significantly to the demand. As India seeks to become a major manufacturing hub through Make in India and National Green Hydrogen Mission, the demand will likely increase in the future. The Perform, Achieve and Trade scheme is the major government step to improve energy efficiency in the sector.

=== Residential ===
The residential sector primarily includes use of household appliances such as air conditioners, refrigerators, fans, and other appliances. Rapid urbanization and rural electrification efforts have driven consumption. With rising global temperatures, residential demand will likely be driven by cooling needs. Steps taken by government to shape consumption include standards & labeling (to help consumers identify energy-efficient products), UJALA (LED bulbs), and Go Electric Campaign (to promote electric mobility and electric cooking).

=== Agriculture ===
Irrigation pumps are the main source of consumption in this sector. In many states, electricity for agriculture is either subsidized or provided for free, which has led to inefficiencies and high consumption levels. The government has been working to reduce energy wastage in this sector by promoting solar-powered irrigation systems (PM-KUSUM) and more energy-efficient pumps (part of AgDSM), which are expected to help curb future demand.

=== Commercial ===
The commercial sector includes areas like offices, retail establishments, malls, hotels, and restaurants. With increasing urbanization and the growth of the services sector, demand for electricity in this sector is steadily rising. Adoption of energy-efficient technologies and sustainable building practices is helping manage consumption growth.

=== Others ===
This includes municipal sector which encompasses public lighting, water works and sewage. MuDSM was launched to reduce energy consumption.

=== Railway traction ===
Ongoing electrification efforts by Indian Railways is the main driver of rising consumption trend. Replacing diesel operated routes with electricity. As of May 31, 2026, India has electrified 99.6% of its broad-gauge railway network (70,002 route km out of 70,271 route km).

Government's efforts on improving energy efficiency across all the sectors, resulted in a net energy savings of 210 TWh between FY 2011-12 and 2020-21. For FY 2020-21, 56% of overall yearly savings came from industrial sector, and 40% from residential.

== International trade ==
India is centrally located in South Asian region, sharing boundaries with Nepal, Bhutan, Bangladesh, and Myanmar. India and these neighboring countries have signed bilateral agreements for cross-border power transfer.

- India–Bhutan (2006): The nations signed an agreement to jointly develop hydroelectric power projects in Bhutan and the transmission systems, allowing trade between the nations.
- India–Bangladesh (2010): The nations signed an MoU to established cross-border grid connectivity for power generation and transmission.
- India–Nepal (2014): The nations signed an agreement to establish cross-border grid connectivity for power exchange and trading.
- India–Myanmar (2016): The nations signed an MoU for mutually beneficial investments in R&D, consultancy, cooperation in generation and transmission in order to enhance Myanmar's power sector.
- India–Saudi Arabia (2023): The nations signed an MoU to explore connecting their electricity systems, exchange electricity during peak demand periods or emergencies. And jointly develop renewable energy and green hydrogen projects.
- India–United Arab Emirates (2024): The nations signed an MoU to develop cross-border interconnection for trade and cooperation on regulatory matters, development of green hydrogen and energy storage technologies.
- India–Sri Lanka (2025): The nations signed an MoU to develop solar projects in Sri Lanka along with cross-border interconnection for trade.

India's electricity trade (TWh)
Fiscal year	Bhutan		Nepal		Bangladesh		Myanmar	
	Export	Import	Export	Import	Export	Import	Export	Import
2023-24	1.1	5	1.8	1.7	8.4	0	0.01	0
2024-25	0.9	5.3	1.6	2.1	8.1	0	0.01	0
2025-26	1.7	7.7	1.4	3.3	8.2	0	0.01	0

One Sun, One World, One Grid (OSOWOG): Under the International Solar Alliance, India aims to create a globally interconnected renewable-energy grid to enable cross-border transfer of solar and other clean energy, based on the principle that the sun never sets across the world.

== Governance and regulatory framework ==
Electricity is a concurrent subject matter in the Constitution of India. As such, central and state governments can both legislate on the Indian power sector. The sector is primarily governed under the Electricity Act, 2003 and the Energy Conservation Act, 2001, which together lay out the regulatory and policy foundations for generation, transmission, distribution, and energy efficiency.

=== Central level ===
Ministry of Power is the nodal ministry which oversees the development of the electricity sector in India. It is responsible for planning, policy formulation, processing of projects for investment decisions, monitoring project implementation, training and manpower development, and the administration and enactment of legislation related to thermal and hydro power, as well as the transmission and distribution network. It is also responsible for the administration of India's Electricity Act (2003), the Energy Conservation Act (2001).

Central Electricity Authority (CEA) is the technical advisory body to the Ministry, which is also responsible for data collection and dissemination, through its National Electricity Plan for a five year period.

Ministry of New and Renewable Energy (MNRE) is the nodal ministry for the development and promotion of renewable energy technologies. MNRE facilitates research, design, development, manufacture, and deployment, setting technical standards, and aligning domestic renewable energy costs with global benchmarks.

Central Electricity Regulatory Commission (CERC) is an autonomous statutory body responsible for regulating the electricity sector at the national level. It regulates the tariff of generating companies owned or controlled by the Central Government and regulates, issues licenses and determine tariff for inter-state transmission.

=== State level ===
State electricity regulatory commissions (SERCs) function as independent regulators at the state level, determining tariffs, issuing licenses, promoting competition, and ensuring consumer protection. They operate under the guidance of the Electricity Act, 2003, and coordinate with CERC for interstate issues.

== Electricity market ==
In the electricity market in India, power can be traded between generators, distributors and large consumers through bilateral contracts or power exchanges. Bilateral contracts are negotiated between two parties and are often for long term, providing stable prices. Power exchanges allow electricity to be traded through collective transactions, where buy and sell bids are anonymously submitted and aggregated. The market is cleared based on supply-demand equilibrium, with the intersection of the demand and supply curves determining the Market Clearing Price (MCP) and Market Clearing Volume (MCV). Power exchanges helps supplement long term arrangements, while allowing discovery of efficient prices.

India has three power exchanges:

- India Energy Exchange (IEX)
- Power Exchange of India (PXIL)
- Hindustan Power Exchange (HPX)

They offer products like day-ahead market, real-time market, and term-ahead market. These exchanges are regulated by CERC and also allow trading of Renewable Energy Certificates. In FY 2024-25, out of 1692 TWh supplied, 143.7 TWh (about 8.5%) was transacted via power exchanges, with the balance being supplied under long-term or bilateral arrangements. 8.5% is relatively small compared to countries with liberalized markets where exchanges handle a much larger share.

Multiple power exchanges create fragmentation and lead to disparate price discovery. CERC has ordered market coupling to create a single clearing price, simplifying procurement, improving cost predictability, and reducing administrative burdens for DISCOMs and industries while improving price discovery and system efficiency. The coupling would be implemented for Day-Ahead Market by Jan 2026 after a shadow pilot project was conducted which could lead to a savings of ₹1.4 crore per day.

CERC would also couple other segments like real-time market and term-ahead market after pilot runs and consultations.

== Environmental concerns ==
The electricity sector in India has significant environmental implications, primarily due to the continued reliance on fossil fuels, especially coal. While renewable energy capacity is expanding rapidly, coal still dominates the generation mix, contributing to high levels of air and water pollution, land degradation, and greenhouse gas emissions.

=== Air pollution ===
Prior to 2015, thermal power plants were only required to meet the norms for particulate matter (150 mg/ Nm3 for 210 MW and above; 350 mg/ Nm3 for less than 210 MW plant), with standards set for chimney height for proper emission dispersion (220m for less than 500 MW, 275m for above 500 MW).

In December 2015, MoEFCC introduced following regulations for thermal power plants with initial compliance deadline of Dec 2017. Due to techno-economic constraints, the deadlines were extended multiple times with the latest deadlines below.

Emission norms (mg/Nm3)
Installed date	PM	NOx	Mercury	SO2
Before Jan 2004	100	600	0.03 (≥ 500MW)	600 (< 500 MW)
Before Jan 2004	100	600	0.03 (≥ 500MW)	200 (≥ 500 MW)
Jan 2004 – Dec 2016	50	450	0.03	600 (<500 MW)
Jan 2004 – Dec 2016	50	450	0.03	200 (≥ 500 MW)
Jan 2017 onward	30	100	0.03	100
Retirement deadlines for compliance exemption	Category A: Dec 2022 Category B: Dec 2025 Category C: Dec 2025			Category A: Dec 2030 Category B: Dec 2030 Category C: Exempt
Compliance deadlines for non-retiring plants	Category A: Dec 2022 Category B: Dec 2023 Category C: Dec 2024			Category A: Dec 2027 Category B: Dec 2028 Category C: Exempt

Note:

- Category A plants: Plants within 10 km radius of NCR and cities having 10L+ population (as per 2011 census)
- Category B plants: Plants within 10 km radius of critically polluted areas or non-attainment cities (as per CPCB)
- Category C plants: Remaining plants

In case of non-compliance after the stipulated deadlines, an Environmental Compensation of Rs. 0.2 / unit generated will be levied for up to 180 days, Rs 0.3 / unit for 180–365 days, and Rs 0.4 / unit for beyond 365 days.

=== Water and land impacts ===
Coal mining, particularly open-cast mining, leads to deforestation, land degradation, and displacement of communities in several parts of the country.

Coal-based power generation requires substantial water for cooling, which can stress local water resources, especially in water-scarce regions. Additionally, the discharge of heated water into rivers and lakes can lead to thermal pollution, affecting aquatic ecosystems. In December 2015, MoEFCC introduced following regulations for thermal power plants with a deadline of Dec 2017. However, compliance remains uneven.

Installed date	Specific water consumption
Before Jan 2017	3.5 m3/MWh
Jan 2017 onward	Initial: 2.5 m3/MWh Revised: 3 m3/MWh

=== Greenhouse gas emissions ===
CO2 emissions from electricity sector

India emitted 2959 million tonnes of CO2 equivalent (excluding LULUCF) in FY 2020-21, with electricity sector emitting 909.7 MT CO2, contributing 31% to the total emissions.

The sector emitted 1234.2 MT CO2 in FY 2024-25, with a weighted average emission intensity of 0.71 kg CO2 / kWh of electricity generated. Emission figures include generation from utility plants and power injected into the grid by captive plants.

CO2 emissions per kwh

Emissions from electricity sector
FY	CO2 (million tonnes)	Weighted average emission factor
2020-21	909.7	0.703
2021-22	1002	0.715
2022-23	1108.1	0716
2023-24	1203.4	0.727
2024-25	1234.2	0.710

Total emissions are estimated to reach 1114 MT CO2 in FY 2029-30, with an average emission factor of 0.477 kg CO2 / kWh.

== Challenges ==
India's electricity sector faces many challenges, categorized across generation, transmission & distribution and consumption.

=== Generation ===
- Dependency on coal: Despite growth in renewables, coal remains dominant in generation, leading to air pollution and greenhouse gas emissions fueling climate change. The government has indicated that coal will likely peak between 2030-35.
- Coal plants flexibility: Indian coal plants were designed to run at a minimum technical load (MTL) of 70–80% of their rated capacity. Due to increasing share of variable renewable energy generation, coal plants have to operate at low output, ramp up and down more frequently than they were originally designed for. This causes significant wear and tear. However, after modifications and new operating practices, many can now operate at around 55%, with some modern units at 40%, and further plans at 25% MTL.
- Grid stability: The intermittent nature of solar and wind generation also puts strain on the grid to maintain a constant frequency. BESS can act as a shock absorber to balance the difference between generation and consumption.

=== Transmission and distribution ===
- DISCOM's Finances: Despite improvements under various government schemes, India has high T&D losses due to ageing infrastructure, poor billing efficiency, poor collection efficiency and power theft. This leads to delays, cash flow problems, and loss of revenue for DISCOMs. Tariff reforms and better billing efficiency could improve their financial health.
- Congestion: India's overall renewable curtailment has generally been relatively low on a national basis, but certain regions (Gujarat, Rajasthan, and Tamil Nadu) have experienced higher renewable generation than they could consume locally. Expanding interstate transmission networks for power evacuation, and co-locating ESS with solar and wind plants can help with transmission congestion, while supplying renewable power round-the-clock.

=== Consumption ===
- Quality of supply: While India has achieved 100% household electrification, most households, especially in rural areas, find the electricity supply intermittent and unreliable.
- Subsidies & political interference: Due to vote-bank politics, electricity prices for farmers are kept artificially low, which often leads to wasteful consumption. Further burdening state finances.

== See also ==
- Energy in India
- Energy policy of India
- Oil and gas industry in India
- Climate change in India – Emissions, effects and responses of India related to climate change
- East West Gas Pipeline – Natural gas pipeline project
- List of electricity organisations in India
- Central Electricity Authority – Indian statutory organization
- List of power stations in India
- Indian Rivers Inter-link – Project to interlink rivers in India
- List of countries by electricity production
