= Unnat Jyoti by Affordable LEDs for All =

Indian efficient LED lighting distribution project

Unnat Jyoti by Affordable LEDs for All (UJALA)
- Country: India
- Ministry: MoP
- Key people: Raj Kumar Singh
- Launched: 5 January 2015; 10 years ago
- Status: Active
- Website: www.ujala.gov.in

Unnat Jyoti by Affordable LEDs for All (UJALA) was a project to distribute efficient LED lighting, launched by Prime Minister of India Narendra Modi on 5 Jan 2015. The project is spearheaded by the Energy Efficiency Services Limited. In non-subsidized LED lamp distribution projects, this program is considered the world's largest. In May 2017, the Government of India announced that they were expanding the LED distribution project to the United Kingdom.

== See also ==
- Energy Conservation Building Code
