= Central Electricity Authority (India) =

Indian statutory organization

- Headquarters: Sewa Bhawan; Sector-1, Rama Krishna Puram, New Delhi, India
- Owner: Ministry of Power (India)
- Website: cea.nic.in

The Central Electricity Authority (CEA) is a statutory body under the Ministry of Power responsible for advising the Government of India on matters related to the generation, transmission, distribution, and planning of electricity. Established in 1951 under the Electricity (Supply) Act, 1948 and continued under the Electricity Act, 2003, the CEA plays a key role in formulating policies, setting technical and safety standards, monitoring the development of the power sector in the country, and promoting the integrated operation of the national power grid to ensure reliable and sustainable electricity supply across India.

Officers from the Central Power Engineering Services Cadre, recruited through Engineering Services Examination conducted by the Union Public Service Commission, are posted to the Central Electricity Authority.

== Responsibilities ==
Under the Electricity Act 2003, the Central Electricity Authority is responsible for advising the Government of India on matters related to the electricity sector and ensuring the coordinated development of the country's power system. Its key responsibilities include formulating plans for the development of electricity generation, transmission, and distribution; monitoring the performance of the power sector; and promoting the integrated operation of the national electricity grid.

The Authority develops and enforces technical standards for electrical infrastructure, grid connectivity, and safety measures to ensure the reliable and secure operation of the power system. It also collects, analyses, and publishes data and statistics relating to electricity generation, consumption, demand, and capacity addition.

In addition, the CEA conducts investigations and studies on power system planning, assesses future electricity demand, and evaluates proposals for new power projects. It advises central and state governments, regulatory bodies, and power utilities on technical and policy matters. The Authority also plays a significant role in promoting energy efficiency, renewable energy integration, power system reliability, and the adoption of modern technologies within the Indian power sector.

== See also ==
- Electricity sector in India
