= Bureau of Energy Efficiency =

Indian government agency

Bureau of Energy Efficiency ऊर्जा दक्षता ब्यूरो
- Bureau of Energy Efficiency, India
- Abbreviation: BEE
- Formation: 1 March 2002; 24 years ago
- Type: Statutory body
- Legal status: Constituted by Energy Conservation Act, 2001.
- Purpose: To promote efficient use and conservation of energy in India.
- Location(s): Sewa Bhawan; Sector-1, Rama Krishna Puram, New Delhi, India
- Region served: India
- Parent organisation: Ministry of Power

The Bureau of Energy Efficiency (BEE) is a statutory body under the Ministry of Power, Government of India, established on 1 March 2002 under the provisions of the Energy Conservation Act, 2001. Its primary objective is to promote efficient use of energy and its conservation across various sectors of the Indian economy.

The Bureau formulates policies and strategies to reduce the energy intensity of the economy, develops energy efficiency standards and labeling programmes, and coordinates with central and state governments, industry, and other stakeholders to implement energy conservation initiatives. BEE also administers national programmes aimed at improving energy efficiency in buildings, industries, appliances, and transportation, thereby contributing to India's energy security, economic development, and climate change mitigation efforts.

== Actions & Activities ==
The broad objectives of BEE are as follows:

- To exert leadership and provide policy recommendation and direction to national energy conservation and efficiency efforts and programs.
- To coordinate energy efficiency and conservation policies and programs and take it to the stakeholders
- To establish systems and procedures to measure, monitor and verify energy efficiency results in individual sectors as well as at a macro level.
- To leverage multi-lateral, bi-lateral, and private sector support in implementation of Energy Conservation Act and efficient use of energy and its conservation programs.
- To demonstrate delivery of energy efficiency services as mandated in the EC bill through private-public partnerships.
- To interpret, plan and manage energy conservation programs as envisaged in the Energy Conservation Act.
- To promote research and development in energy efficiency and energy conservation.
- To develop testing and certification procedures for energy consumption of equipment and appliances and promote the testing facilities.
- To strengthen consultancy services in the field of energy conservation.

Energy Audit : The Government of India has identified certain energy intensive industries labelled as 'designated consumers', and made it compulsory for them to conduct Energy Audits following the ‘Bureau of Energy Efficiency (Manner and Intervals of Time for Conduct of Energy Audit) Regulations, 2010’ It has declared new energy standards for ACs which will be applicable from 1 January 2021.

Energy Efficient Lamps: Bachat Lamp Yojana is a voluntary participation program that provides Energy Efficient Compact Fluorescent Lamps (CFLs) at the same cost as regular incandescent bulbs. Participant investors in the sales earn internationally tradeable carbon credits under the Clean Development Mechanism of the Kyoto Protocol.

Standards and Labeling: The BEE has made it mandatory for certain high energy use consumer equipment and appliances to be tested and labeled with their energy performance in order for consumers to be able to make an informed choice about their purchases. The program also allows for some classes of products to volunteer for testing and labeling. The program includes outreach and workshops for sellers to understand the labeling and the cost and energy saving potential of rated equipment and appliances in order for them to inform customers. The program includes a searchable database for consumers to compare products.

Under this scheme, BEE has made it mandatory for certain appliances like air conditioners, refrigerators, and LED bulbs to display energy efficiency star ratings on their labels. These star ratings help consumers evaluate the power consumption and energy savings of different models.

== See also ==
- Bachat Lamp Yojna
- Energy Conservation Building Code
- Life Long Learning (3L) Programme
- Ministry of New and Renewable Energy
- Ministry of Power
- National Mission for Enhanced Energy Efficiency
- Renewable energy in India

== Energy Auditor Accreditation ==
Under the Energy Conservation Act, 2001, the Bureau of Energy Efficiency maintains a registry of accredited energy auditors and energy auditing firms empanelled to conduct energy audits of designated consumers. Empanelled firms are assigned a registration number and are authorised to conduct energy audits that satisfy the compliance requirements under the Act. The BEE empanelment system forms the basis for mandatory energy audits in energy-intensive industries such as cement, steel, aluminium, fertiliser, and textile sectors.
