= Green Grids Initiative — One Sun, One World, One Grid =

Electrical grid integration initiative

- Country: Global
- Partners: International Solar Alliance, India, France, United Kingdom
- Vision: The OSOWOG initiative aims to connect different regional grids through a common grid that will be used to transfer renewable energy power and, thus, realize the potential of renewable energy sources, especially solar energy.
- Conceptualised: October 2018
- Estimated completion: 2030
- Capacity: 2600 gigawatt
- Website: http://www.isolaralliance.org

Green Grids Initiative — One Sun, One World, One Grid (GGI — OSOWOG) is an initiative by the International Solar Alliance (ISA), India, France and United Kingdom to build a global green energy grid, primarily focusing on solar and wind energy.

== History ==
Indian Prime Minister Narendra Modi proposed the One Sun, One World, One Grid (OSOWOG) initiative in the first assembly of the International Solar Alliance (ISA) in October 2018. In May 2021 United Kingdom and India agreed to merge their Green Grids Initiative (GGI) and OSOWOG initiatives respectively, during the UK—India Virtual Summit. On the sidelines of COP26 in November 2021, the merged initiative was launched. About 83 ISA member nations have endorsed the initiative. The ISA and the World Bank are instrumental in the implementation of initiative.

== Initiative ==
The project has proposed three phases. In the first phase, the grids of Middle East, South Asia and Southeast Asia would be integrated. In second phase, the Asian grid will be connected with African grid. In last phase, the grid will be the global grid. The feasibility study has been commissioned by ISA.

India, Bhutan, Bangladesh, Nepal and Myanmar have cross-border transmission infrastructure which could be upgraded for the initiative.

ISA director general Ajay Mathur said that the proposed grid could have interconnection capacity of 2600 gigawatt by 2050.

== See also ==
- Global Energy Interconnection
