= Adani Green Energy =

Indian renewable energy private company

Adani Green Energy Limited

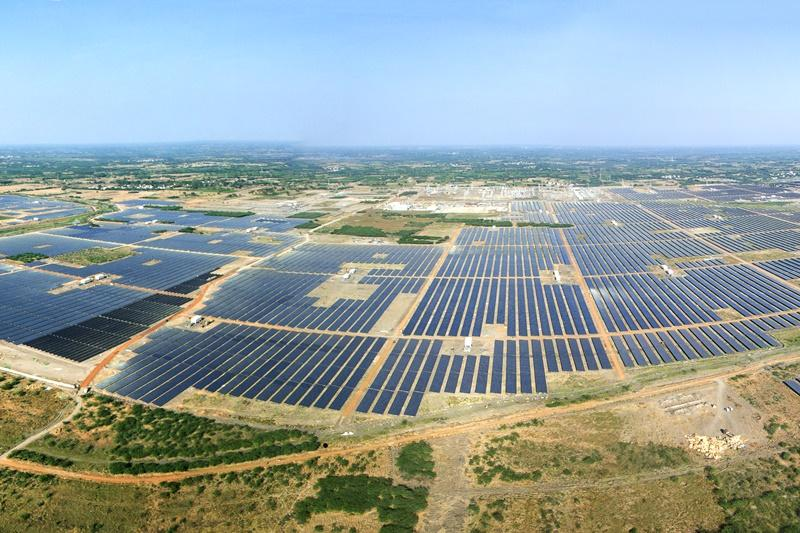
- Aerial view of Kamuthi Solar Power Project
- Type: Public
- Traded as: BSE: 541450; NSE: ADANIGREEN
- ISIN: INE364U01010
- Industry: Renewable energy
- Founded: 2015; 11 years ago
- Founder: Gautam Adani
- Headquarters: Ahmedabad, Gujarat, India
- Area served: India
- Key people: Vineet S. Jain(Managing Director and CEO)
- Products: Solar energy; Wind energy
- Revenue: ▲₹10,460 crore (US$1.1 billion) (2024)
- Operating income: ▲₹1,628 crore (US$170 million) (2024)
- Net income: ▲₹1,260 crore (US$130 million) (2024)
- Total assets: ▲₹88,538 crore (US$9.5 billion) (2024)
- Total equity: ▲₹17,448 crore (US$1.9 billion) (2024)
- Number of employees: 3,324 (including 1727 off-roll) (2024)
- Parent: Adani Group (55%); TotalEnergies (20%)
- Website: adanigreenenergy.com

Adani Green Energy Limited (AGEL) is an Indian renewable energy company, headquartered in Ahmedabad, India. It is majority-owned by the Indian conglomerate Adani Group, which is a major international coal-mining enterprise, and minority-owned by TotalEnergies. The company operates Kamuthi Solar Power Project, one of the largest solar photovoltaic plants in the world.

== History ==
The company was incorporated on 23 January 2016, as Adani Green Energy Limited under the Companies Act 2013.

During the initial days of existence, AGEL and Inox Wind together established a 20 MW capacity wind power project in Lahori, Madhya Pradesh. Also, AGEL bought Inox Wind's 50 MW wind power project at Dayapar village in Kutch. The project was conceived by the latter when it won a Solar Energy Corporation of India's capacity bids for wind power projects connected to the National Grid.

In 2015–2016, Adani Renewable Energy Park Limited, a subsidiary of AGEL, signed a joint venture agreement with the Government of Rajasthan.

In 2017, the company took the complete control of overall solar energy portfolio of Adani Enterprises and got itself listed at National Stock Exchange of India and Bombay Stock Exchange.

In 2022, Adani Green Energy Limited had a market cap of Rs. 3,26,635.42 crore.

== Operations ==
Currently, the company manages 5,290 MW of wind energy and solar power plants including 46 operational projects in 11 states of India namely Uttar Pradesh, Rajasthan, Punjab, Maharashtra, Gujarat, Madhya Pradesh, Chhattisgarh, Andhra Pradesh, Karnataka, Tamil Nadu, and Telangana. AGEL has a current project portfolio of ~5.29 GW and an operational capacity of ~2.36 GW.

As of 31 March 2019, AGEL has one joint venture and 39 subsidiaries.

In May 2020, AGEL won the world's largest solar bid worth $6 billion by the Solar Energy Corporation of India (SECI). The bid entails AGEL building an 8000 MW photovoltaic power plant.

In May 2021, AGEL confirmed its decision to buy SoftBank Group Corp backed SB Energy Holdings Limited for $3.5 billion.

According to media reports, The Khavda renewable energy plant was initiated in December 2022, and its first production occurred on 31 December 2023.The plant covers an area of 538 square kilometers. The hybrid renewable energy cluster generates solar energy during the day and wind energy in the evening, with an operational capacity of 2,000 MW of solar energy.

The wind turbines used at Khavda had a capacity of 5.2 MW each, based on German designs and manufactured at Adani Group facilities near Mundra Port. According to the report, it supplied electricity to millions of households annually and reduced carbon dioxide emissions by an estimated 58 million tonnes per year. The site also featured waterless robotic cleaning systems for solar panels to reduce water consumption in the arid environment. In 2024, United States Ambassador Eric Garcetti visited the Khavda site and highlighted its role in the US–India partnership on clean energy.

In May 2026, AGEL commissioned 3.37 GWh of battery energy storage at Khavda; by October, three further projects had raised operational battery storage capacity there to 6.63 GWh.

== Green bonds ==
In late 2019, AGEL became the first Indian company to offer investment-grade US dollar green bonds worth US$362.5 million to foreign investors. The bonds got listed on Singapore Exchange Securities Trading Limited (SGX- ST) on 15 October 2019 and it will mature on the same date in 2039.

== Acquisitions ==
In March 2018, upon acquisition of 49 percent equity shares of Kodangal Solar Parks Private Limited, the latter became a joint venture of AGEL. In 2019, AGEL acquired the rest 51 percent equity share as well.

In mid-2019, AGEL acquired Essel Group's solar power portfolio of 205 MW located in Punjab, Karnataka and Uttar Pradesh for US$185 million (approx. ₹1,300 crores). AGEL has also agreed to buy out the remaining 480 MW solar energy portfolio of the former which are under construction.

In early 2020, French energy company TotalEnergies entered into a binding agreement with AGEL for the investment of US$510 million to acquire a 20% stake in the latter.

In May 2021, AGEL acquired SoftBank Group Corp backed SB Energy Holdings Limited for $3.5 billion.

== Controversies ==
=== Rajasthan Solar Park ===
Local farmers have opposed to construction of 1.5 GW solar park at Pokhran after which High Court of Rajasthan has ordered status quo.

== See also ==
- List of renewable energy companies by country
- Renewable energy in India
- Solar power in India
- Wind power in India
