= Prayagraj Solar Power Plant =

- Country: India
- Status: Operational
- Commission date: 2018
- Owner: EMC LIMITED

Power generation
- Nameplate capacity: 50 MW

External links
- Website: www.emcpower.com

Prayagraj Solar Power Project is the first solar power plant in Uttar Pradesh. The plant has been developed by Kolkata-based company EMC Limited at Naini, Prayagraj, 25 km away from Prayagraj as part of Jawaharlal Nehru National Solar Mission. The plant is spread out over 25 acres of land.

== See also ==
- Solar power in India
- Renewable energy in India
