= Solairedirect =

Solairedirect S.A.
- Type: Private
- Industry: Renewable energy, solar power
- Founded: 2006
- Headquarters: Paris, France
- Key people: Thierry Lepercq (president)
- Products: Photovoltaic plants, solar modules, solar energy
- Website: www.solairedirect.com

Solairedirect is a global renewable energy company focused on solar power. Headquartered in Paris, the company is the main solar power producer in France and has also international operations in the US, Chile, India and South Africa. In develops, builds, owns, and operates solar power plants. The company announced its acquisition by Engie in July 2015 after it had pulled out of its IPO process the company had announced in April 2015.

Its business consists mainly in the development and commissioning of solar parks projects (land identification, sourcing of solar panels and plant equipment, sourcing of civil works, connection to the local electricity grid) and in managing and maintaining those parks, including on behalf of third parties investors the company sells its solar parks to. In march 2015, the company, advised by Conquest Advisory, sold two solar parks in South West France. Later in the same year, it was awarded a licence for the construction of 48 MW in Chile, after having acquired 72MW in May in the country, and won a bid for 54 MW in Punjab, India.

== See also ==
- Solar power in India
- Solar Energy Corporation of India
- CleanMax Solar
- Tata Power Solar
