= Canal Solar Power Project =

Energy project in Gujarat, India

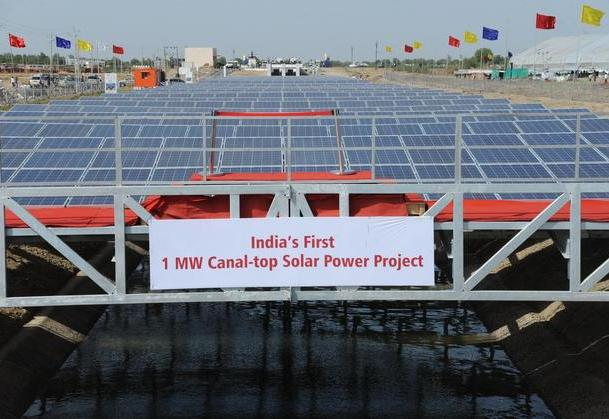
Canal Solar Power Project in Kadi

The Canal Solar Power Project is a solar canal project launched in Gujarat, India, to use the 532 km (331 mi) long network of Narmada canals across the state for setting up solar panels to generate electricity. The first such project in India, it has been commissioned by SunEdison India.

== Inauguration of pilot project ==
On 24 April 2012 Narendra Modi, then Chief Minister of Gujarat, inaugurated a 1 Megawatt (MW) pilot project covering 750 metres (2,460 ft) of the canal. The project is situated on the Narmada branch canal near Chandrasan village of Kadi taluka in Mehsana district.

In addition to generating 1 MW of clean energy the pilot project will also prevent evaporation of 9,000,000 litres (2,000,000 imperial gallons; 2,400,000 US gallons) of water annually from the canal. The project eliminates the need to acquire vast tracts of land for installing solar panels and limits evaporation of water. tackling two challenges simultaneously by providing energy and water security.

== Engineering and construction ==
The engineering, procurement and construction contract for the project was awarded to SunEdison at a cost of ₹177.1 million (US$2.1 million). The pilot project was developed on a 750-meter stretch of the canal by Gujarat State Electricity Corporation (GSECL) with support from Sardar Sarovar Narmada Nigam Ltd. (SSNNL), which owns and maintains the canal network.

The cost per megawatt of solar power, in this case, was much less than regular solar power plants, as the two banks of the canal will be used to cover the canal by installing solar power panel and the government did not have to spend much on creating basic infrastructure, including land acquisition .

Gujarat has about 458 km (285 mi) of open main canal, while the total canal length, including sub-branches, is about 19,000 km (12,000 mi) at present. When completed, the SSNNL's canal network will be about 85,000 km (53,000 mi) long.

Assuming a utilization of only 10% of the existing canal network of 19,000 kilometres (12,000 mi), it is estimated that 2,200 MW of solar power generating capacity can be installed by covering the canals with solar panels.

This also implies that 11,000 acres (45 km^{2}) of land can be potentially conserved along with about 20 billion liters of water saved per year.

== Praise for the project ==
Then Union Minister for New and Renewable Energy Farooq Abdullah praised Gujarat's Canal Solar Power Project saying,

Gujarat has shown the way with the commissioning of the world's first 1 MW canal-top solar power plant in Mehsana district.

Abdullah said Damodar Valley Corporation, which has over 2,000 km (1,200 mi) of canals, will follow Gujarat's lead and mount solar panels that can generate up to 1,000 MW.

As a pilot the project has been successful and has caused similar projects to be started elsewhere, e.g. a 2.5 MW installation over the Sidhwan Canal in Punjab and a project to cover Delhi's Munak canal.

== See also ==
- Electricity sector in India
- Renewable energy in India
- Gujarat Solar Park
- Sakri PV solar energy project
- Jawaharlal Nehru National Solar Mission
- Dhirubhai Ambani Solar Park
