= Vikram Solar =

Indian solar energy company

Vikram Solar Limited
- Company type: Public
- Traded as: BSE: 544488; NSE: VIKRAMSOLR
- Industry: Solar energy
- Founded: 2005; 21 years ago
- Founder: Gyanesh Chaudhary
- Headquarters: Kolkata, West Bengal, India
- Area served: Worldwide
- Key people: Gyanesh Chaudhary (chairman & managing director)
- Products: Solar modules
- Revenue: INR 25,109.90 Million (FY 2023-24)
- Number of employees: 1,513 employees and 728 contractual employees (FY 2023-24)
- Website: www.vikramsolar.com

Vikram Solar Limited is an Indian solar energy company headquartered in Kolkata, West Bengal. It manufactures solar photovoltaic (PV) modules and develops solar power projects through engineering, procurement, and construction (EPC) and operations and maintenance (O&M) services.

As of January 2026, the company has an annual module manufacturing capacity of 9.5 GW. Vikram Solar became a publicly traded company in August 2025 and is listed on the Bombay Stock Exchange (BSE) and the National Stock Exchange of India (NSE).

== History ==
Vikram Solar was founded in 2005 by Gyanesh Chaudhary. It began manufacturing operations in 2009 with an initial annual capacity of 12 MW. In its early operations, the company participated in utility-scale solar projects in India and Germany, including projects under the first phase of India's National Solar Mission. Between 2013 and 2014, the company installed a 100 kW rooftop solar facility at Cochin International Airport and commissioned a 10 kW floating solar plant in Rajarhat, Kolkata, which was the first such installation in India.

From 2015 to 2019, the company increased its annual manufacturing capacity to 1 GW and began exporting modules to Africa, Europe, and the United States. During this period, it executed utility-scale projects for several public-sector entities, including NTPC Limited.

In August 2025, the company completed an initial public offering (IPO) that raised ₹2,079 crore. Its equity shares were listed on the BSE and NSE on 26 August 2025.

== Manufacturing and technology ==
Vikram Solar's manufacturing facilities are located at the Falta Special Economic Zone in West Bengal, and in Oragadam and Vallam in Tamil Nadu. In November 2025, the company commissioned an automated facility in Vallam with an annual capacity of 5 GW, increasing its total installed module manufacturing capacity to 9.5 GW.

The Vallam facility utilizes tunnel oxide passivated contact (TOPCon) cell technology and is configured to manufacture modules in M10, G12, and G12R wafer formats. In January 2026, Vikram Solar reported that it had transitioned its module portfolio to G12R-based configurations.

== See also ==
- Solar power in India
