= Kamuthi Solar Power Project =

Photovoltaic power station in Tamil Nadu, India

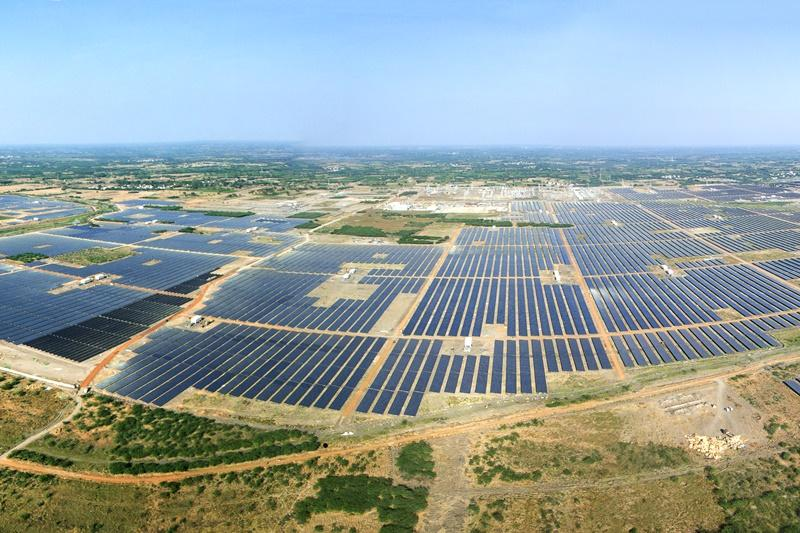
- Aerial view of Kamuthi Solar Park
- Country: India
- Location: Kamuthi, Tamil Nadu
- Coordinates: 9.347568°N 78.392162°E
- Status: Operational
- Construction began: February 2016
- Commission date: March 2017; 9 years ago
- Construction cost: ₹4,550 crore (equivalent to ₹64 billion or US$670 million in 2023)
- Owner: Adani Green Energy

Solar farm
- Type: Flat-panel PV
- Site resource: appr 2100 kWh/(m^{2}*yr)
- Site area: 2,500 acres (1,000 ha)

Power generation
- Nameplate capacity: 648 MW_{p}
- Capacity factor: 24 %
- Annual net output: Appr. 1.35 TWh/yr

External links
- Commons: Related media on Commons

Kamuthi Solar Power Project is a photovoltaic power station spread over an area of 2,500 acres (10 km^{2}) in Kamuthi, Ramanathapuram district, 90 km from Madurai, in the state of Tamil Nadu, India. The project was commissioned by Adani Power. With a generating capacity of 648 MW_{p} at a single location, it is the world's 12th largest solar park based on capacity.

ABB commissioned five sub-stations to connect the solar park with the National Grid on 13 June 2016. The Kamuthi Solar Power Project was completed on 21 September 2016 with an investment of around ₹4,550 crore (equivalent to ₹65 billion or US$680 million in 2023). The solar plant consists of 2.5 million solar modules, 380,000 foundations, 27,000 metres of structures, 576 inverters, 154 transformers, and almost 6,000 km of cables. Construction of the structures needed to mount the solar panels required 30,000 tonnes of galvanised steel. Around 8,500 workers installed an average of 11 MW of capacity per day to complete the project within 8 months.

The entire solar park is connected to a 400 kV substation of the Tamil Nadu Transmission Corp. The solar panels are cleaned daily by a self-charged robotic system.

Given the solar resource of around 2100 kWh/(m^{2}*yr) an annual generation of 1.35 TWh/yr may be possible. This corresponds to a capacity factor (or average power) of 24% of the peak capacity 648 MW_{p}. Assuming a technical life time of 25 years the investment cost is 700 MUSD/(25*1.35 TWh) = 2 US cent/kWh.

== Controversy ==
The plant relies on approximately 200,000 liters of water to keep its 25,000 modules clean each day, which has apparently been sourced from borewells nearby without consent of the respective district authority.

== See also ==
- Solar power in India
- Renewable energy in India
- Ultra Mega Solar Power Projects
