= Vankal Solar Park =

Solar power plant

- Country: India
- Location: Vankal,Khawzawl
- Status: Operational
- Commission date: 18th March 2023

Solar farm
- Type: Flat-panel PV
- Site area: 194 acres (0.3 sq mi)

Power generation
- Nameplate capacity: 20 MW

Vankal Solar Park is a 20-megawatt solar power plant located in Vankal, Khawzawl district, Mizoram, in Northeast India. It is Mizoram's first and largest photovoltaic power plant.

== Features ==
The power plant is spread over an area of 194 acres (78.5 ha) with 52453 Solar Plate/Module. It has 113 Inverter, 7 Inverter Control Room and 1 Main Control Room. The plant is shaped like a hand, with 15 solar array fingers connected by a perimeter road and a 33 kV transmission line. The plant is built with high-efficiency mono-PERC modules and high-wattage string inverter. The solar park was developed at a cost of Rs 2,107 crore, Rs 1,707 crore from the state and Rs 400 crore from the centre.

== Commissioning ==
The power plant was commissioned on 18 March 2023. Sunfree North East Renewable Energy and ATA Renewable P4 Pvt. Ltd has signed a 25-year power purchase agreement with the power and electricity department of the Mizoram government.

== See also ==
- Solar power in India
