= National Institute of Solar Energy =

Government organization in Gurgaon, India

- Type: Government of India's Agencies
- Industry: New and Renewable Energy
- Founded: 24 October 2013; 12 years ago
- Headquarters: Gurgaon, India
- Parent: Ministry of New and Renewable Energy
- Website: nise.res.in

The National Institute of Solar Energy (NISE) is a research and development organization in India, focused on the field of solar energy. Established in 2013, NISE is an autonomous organization under the Ministry of New and Renewable Energy (MNRE). The organization's main goal is to conduct and promote research and development in the field of solar power in India, as well as act as a national resource center for solar energy. It is headquartered in Gurgaon, Haryana.

== History ==
In September 2013, the Union Cabinet approved the establishment of NISE in 2013 as a national institute for solar energy R&D and related activities under MNRE. The National Institute of Solar Energy (NISE) was established in August 2013 by the Ministry of New and Renewable Energy (MNRE) of the Government of India as an autonomous organization. NISE was officially registered under the Haryana Societies Registration Act on October 24, 2013.

The operations of NISE are overseen by a Governing Council, which is led by the Secretary of Ministry of New and Renewable Energy and an Executive Committee headed by the Director-General.

In 2019, NISE and United Nations Industrial Development Organization signed an agreement to launch a skill development program for solar thermal energy sector as part of an MNRE-GEF-UNIDO project.

== Works ==
NISE conducts research on various topics related to solar energy such as photovoltaics, solar thermal system and solar Resource assessment. The organization also provides technical assistance to government agencies and private organizations, and plays a key role in the implementation of national solar energy programs in India. NISE also offers training and education on solar energy technologies to professionals and students and collaborates with other research organizations, both within and outside of India, to advance solar energy research and development.

NISE is also responsible for the development of standards, testing and quality control of solar equipment and devices in India. NISE conducts R&D, testing, certification, standardization, skill development, resource assessment, and awareness in the field of solar energy under MNRE.

== See also ==
- Solar power in India
