= BP Solar =

Former solar manufacturer (1981–2011)

- Type: Subsidiary
- Industry: Solar energy
- Founded: 1981
- Founder: Philip Wolfe
- Defunct: 21 December 2011
- Headquarters: Madrid, Spain
- Area served: Worldwide
- Key people: Reyad Fezzani (CEO)
- Parent: BP
- Subsidiaries: Tata BP Solar
- Website: www.bpsolar.com

BP Solar was a manufacturer and installer of photovoltaic solar cells headquartered in Madrid, Spain, with production facilities in Frederick, MD, India and China. It was a subsidiary of BP.

== History ==
In 1981, BP acquired initially 50% of Lucas Energy Systems which became Lucas BP Solar Systems. The company became wholly owned by BP in the mid-1980s. When BP merged with Amoco in 1998 it acquired Amoco's 50% stake in Solarex. In 1999 it acquired Enron's stake in Solarex and consolidated its PV divisions into a new subsidiary named BP Solarex. In that year the company became the world's leading PV producer. In 2001 the division renamed itself BP Solar.

BP Solar and Indian firm Tata Power established Tata BP Solar, a joint venture company, in 1989. The company began commercial operations in 1991 by establishing its first manufacturing unit with a production capacity of 3 MW in India. BP Solar exited the joint venture in 2012, and Tata BP Solar became a wholly owned subsidiary of the Tata Group.

In 2004, the R&D part of BP Solar was sold to the UK's National Renewable Energy Centre (Narec). In 2013, it became Solar Capture Technologies. In 2010, it closed down the factory at Frederick, Maryland. BP Solar closed on 21 December 2011 when BP announced its departure from the solar energy business.

== Operations ==
PV power plants using BP solar modules include:

- Bürstadt, Germany — 5 MW from 30,000 modules
- Springerville, Arizona, USA — 4.59 MW from 34,980 modules
- Geiseltalsee, Germany — 4 MW from 25,000 modules
- Long Island, New York, USA — 32 MW from 164,312 modules

BP Solar had many projects and co-operative activities in developing countries, including supplying power to 36,000 homes in rural Indonesia, installing 1000 solar devices to provide power to 400 remote villages in the Philippines, and setting up a rural electrification scheme in Malaysia to provide power to 30,000 remote homes in Sabah, Sarawak and Peninsular Malaysia. In the mid-1980s BP installed Solar power for Microwave repeater stations across Sierra Leone in support of a telecommunications network restoration.

BP Solar, together with the Commonwealth Scientific and Industrial Research Organisation (CSIRO), was also involved in the commercialization of a long-life deep cycle lead acid battery suited to the storage of electricity for renewable remote area power systems (RAPS). This GreenGel battery, and CSIRO's new battery charging procedures, aim to reduce capacity loss and premature failure sometimes encountered with existing battery technology. A significant component of the project will be the establishment of a manufacturing process for the production of these advanced batteries at an internationally competitive price, facilitating a major export market.

== See also ==
- Green technology
- List of photovoltaics companies
- Photovoltaic array
- Photovoltaics
- Photovoltaic power stations
- Renewable energy
- Solar power
- Solar shingle
- Solar tracker
- Timeline of solar energy
