= Solar power in India =

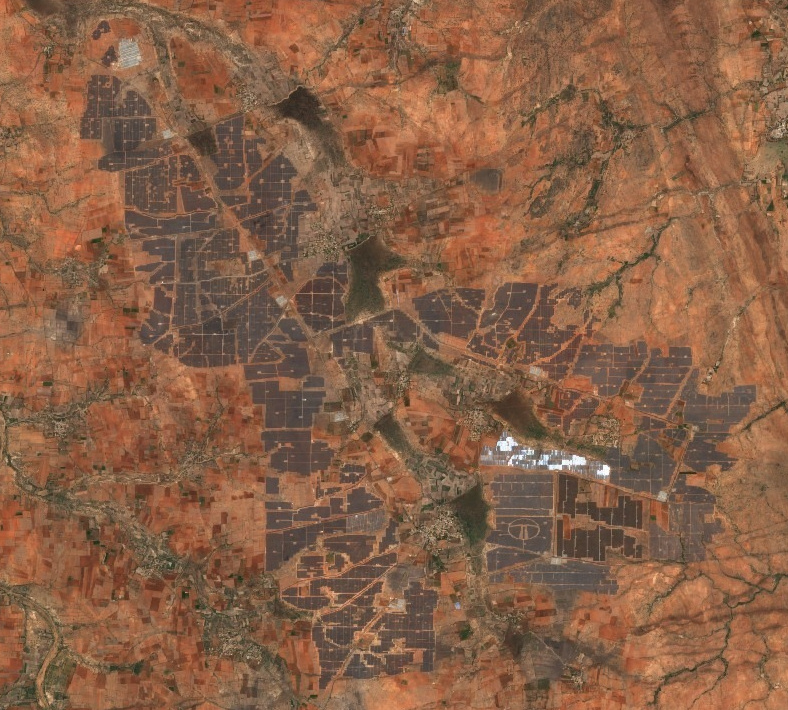
2050 MW Pavagada Solar Park, India's second-largest in Pavagada, Karnataka

India’s solar power has grown nearly 20 times since December 2015, at an average growth rate of 40% per year. As of 2026, it is India’s third-largest source of electricity behind hydro power. This graph charts India's solar power growth relative to the equivalent total electricity demand of other nations.

Solar power is an important source of electricity in India. Since the mid-2010s, India has increased its solar power significantly with the help of various government initiatives. By October 2026, India's solar power installed capacity reached 174.55 GW_{AC}. The nation is one of the world's fastest adopters of solar power, making it the third-largest producer of solar power globally as of 2026, after China and the United States.

India is home to some of the world's largest solar parks as well, including the Bhadla Solar Park in Rajasthan, the nation's largest and the world's 11th-largest as of 2026, with a capacity of 2,245 MW. The Pavagada Solar Park in Karnataka is the nation's second-largest and the world's twelfth-largest, also as of 2026.

With the provision of allowing 100% foreign direct investment in renewable energy, during 2010–19, the foreign capital invested in India on solar power projects was nearly US$20.7 billion, one of the world's highest invested in a single nation so far. In FY2023-24, the nation received US$3.76 billion foreign capital, and is executing 40 GW tenders for solar and hybrid projects. The nation has established over 100 solar parks to make land available to the promoters of solar plants. The Gujarat Hybrid Renewable Energy Park, being built near Khavda in the Rann of Kutch desert in Gujarat, will generate 30 GW_{AC} power from both solar panels and wind turbines. It will become the world's largest hybrid renewable energy park spread over an area of 72,600 hectares (726 km^{2}) of desert. As of 2026, the plant has completed to generate around 13 GW of power, and the remaining will be fully completed by 2029.

The International Solar Alliance (ISA) is headquartered in New Delhi founded by the India itself. The nation has also put forward the concept of "One Sun, One World, One Grid" and "World Solar Bank" to harness abundant solar power on a global scale.

== History ==
Launched in 2003, the Indian Solar Loan Programme was a four-year partnership between United Nations Environment Programme (UNEP), the UNEP Risoe Centre, and two of India's largest banks, the Canara Bank and Syndicate Bank, a particularly impactful program in rural areas of South India where the electricity grid did not yet extend.

On 11 January 2010, the Prime Minister of India, Manmohan Singh inaugurated Jawaharlal Nehru National Solar Mission under the National Action Plan on Climate Change, aiming to achieve 1000MW, 10GW and 20GW solar capacity in regular intervals over the following 12 year period. The final target of 20 GW capacity for 2022 was achieved four years ahead of schedule. In the 2015 Union budget of India, the third phase was revised to 100GW (including 40 GW from rooftop solar) by 2022, targeting an investment of US$100 billion. The target was widely missed by 40,000 MW shortfall due to poor performance in the rooftop sector, and was instead reached on January 31 2025. The mission also aimed to achieve grid parity (electricity delivered at the same cost and quality as that delivered on the grid) which it achieved in 2017 with the cost around ₹4.34 (4.6¢ US) per kWh, around 18% lower than the average price for electricity generated by coal-fired plants.

On 30 November 2015, the Prime Minister of India, Narendra Modi and the President of France Francois Hollande launched the International Solar Alliance, an alliance of 121 solar rich countries lying partially or fully between the Tropic of Cancer and the Tropic of Capricorn with several countries outside of this area also involved with the organization. The ISA aims to promote and develop solar power amongst its members and has the objective of mobilising $1 trillion of investment by 2030.

Rooftop solar power accounts for 2.1 GW in 2018, of which 70% is industrial or commercial. In addition to its large-scale grid-connected solar photovoltaic (PV) initiative, India is developing off-grid solar power for local energy needs. Solar products have increasingly helped to meet rural needs; by the end of 2015 just under 10 lakh (1 million) solar lanterns were sold in the country, reducing the need for kerosene. That year, 118,700 solar home lighting systems were installed and 46,655 solar street lighting installations were provided under a national programme; just over 14 lakh (1.4 million) solar cookers were distributed in India.

== Solar potential ==
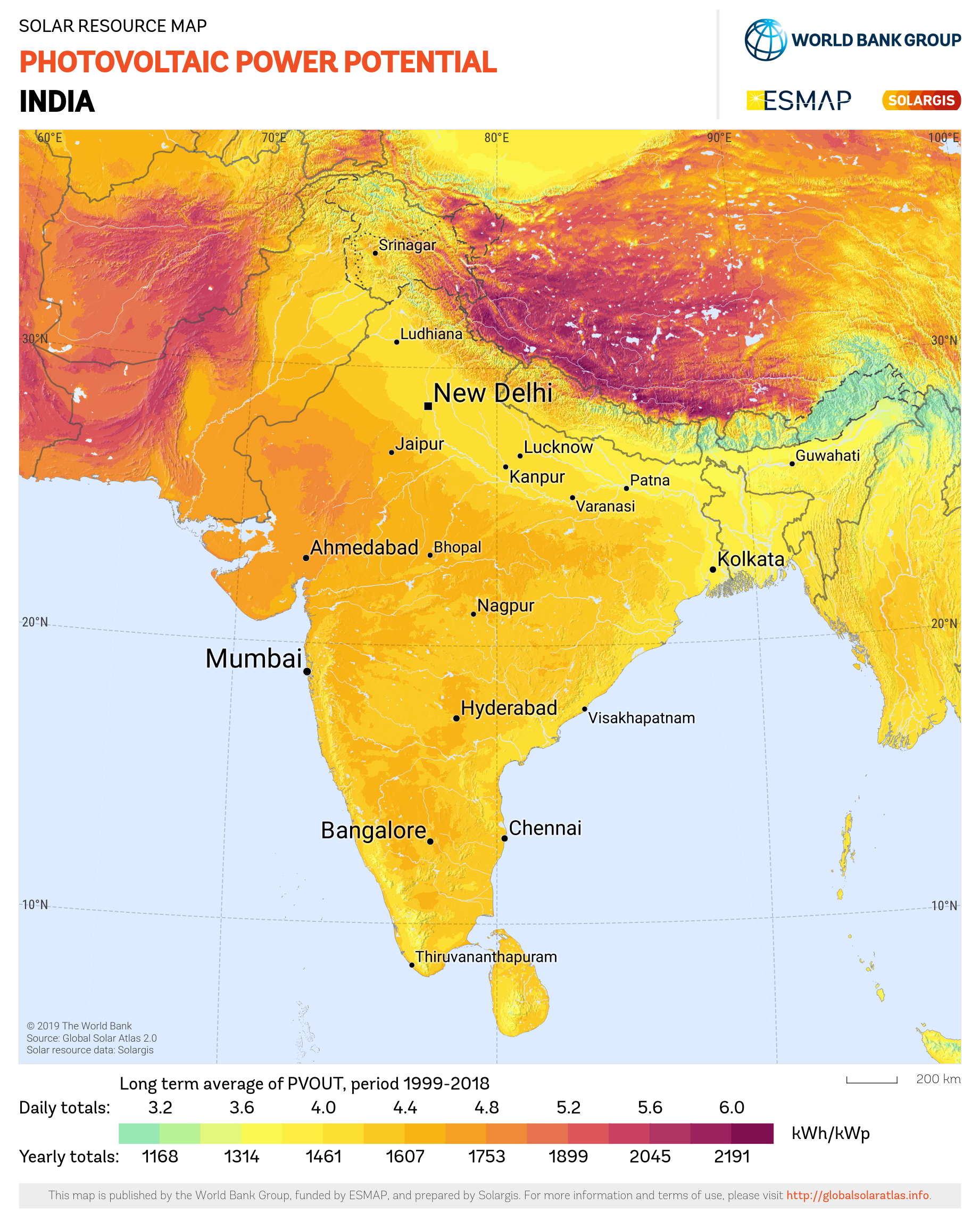
Photovoltaic electricity potential of India

The solar power potential of India is assessed at 10,830 GW in 2025. With about 300 clear and sunny days in a year, the calculated solar energy incidence on India's land area is about 5,000 lakh crore (5,000 trillion) kilowatt-hours (kWh) per year (or 5 EWh/yr). The solar energy available in a single year exceeds the possible energy output of all of the fossil fuel energy reserves in India. The daily average solar-power-plant generation capacity in India is 0.30 kWh per m^{2} of used land area, equivalent to 1,400–1,800 peak (rated) capacity operating hours in a year with available, commercially-proven technology.

Solar radiation resource assessment stations (SRRA) in India. MNRE Phase1, MNRE Phase2, MEDA, AMS, ANERT SRRA stations.

In June 2015, India began a ₹40 crore (US$4.3 million) project to measure solar radiation with a spatial resolution of 3 by 3 kilometres (1.9 mi × 1.9 mi). This solar-radiation measuring network provides the basis for the Indian solar-radiation atlas. 121 solar radiation resource assessment (SRRA) stations have been installed across India by the National Institute of Wind Energy, Ministry of New and Renewable Energy to create a database of solar-energy potential. Data is collected and reported to the Centre for Wind Energy Technology (C-WET). Among the parameters measured are Global Horizontal Irradiance (GHI), Direct Normal Irradiance (DNI) and Diffuse Horizontal Irradiance (DHI).

Currently, 90% of India's solar photovoltaic (PV) capacity is concentrated in just nine states, raising concerns about the resilience of a future PV-dominated grid. Recent studies have shown that during cyclones, PV generation can plummet to near-zero levels. Given that a significant portion of India is prone to cyclones, dust storms, and monsoon rains, deploying PV plants in regions with uncorrelated irradiance profiles can significantly reduce the overall risk of low generation and variability of PV output. Concentration of PV capacity in limited regions may present challenges for grid stability in a PV-dominated future. Geographically diversifying PV sites in India yields multifaceted benefits beyond weather resilience. It can facilitate the strategic integration of regional irradiation patterns, resulting in a balanced year-round energy harvest. Moreover, expanding the geographical footprint extends the effective "daylight hours" for solar generation, bolstering grid reliability. Additionally, this approach mitigates peak production surges, easing grid management and potentially accommodating further PV capacity. Notably, it fosters synergy with existing hydropower infrastructure in the Northeast and leverages the exceptional solar potential of Ladakh, unlocking diverse renewable energy avenues.

== Installations by region ==
=== Summary ===
Installed capacity (MW_{AC})
State or territory	31 Dec 2016	31 March 2017	31 March 2019	31 March 2021	31 March 2023	31 March 2025
Rajasthan	1,317.64	1,812.93	3,226.79	5,732.58	17,055.70	28,761.22
Gujarat	1,158.5	1,249.37	2,440.13	4,430.82	9,254.57	19,421.89
Madhya Pradesh	840.35	857.04	1,840.16	2,463.22	2,802.14	5,156.78
Maharashtra	430.46	452.37	1,633.54	2,289.97	4,722.90	11,151.53
Punjab	545.43	793.95	905.62	959.50	1,167.26	1,421.43
Uttar Pradesh	239.26	336.73	960.10	1,712.50	2,515.22	3,368.87
Uttarakhand	45.10	233.49	306.75	368.41	575.53	593.07
Haryana	53.27	81.40	224.52	407.83	1,029.16	2,099.33
Delhi	38.78	40.27	126.89	192.97	218.26	319.30
Jammu & Kashmir + Ladakh	1	1.36	14.83	20.73	49.44	82.29
Chandigarh	–	17.32	34.71	45.16	58.69	78.85
Himachal Pradesh	0.33	0.73	22.68	42.73	87.49	213.66
Chhattisgarh	–	128.86	231.35	252.48	948.82	1,398.50
Dadra and Nagar Haveli	–	2.97	5.46	5.46	5.46	5.46
Goa	–	0.71	3.81	7.44	26.49	57.64
Daman and Diu	–	10.46	14.47	40.55	41.01	42.66
Tamil Nadu	1,590.97	1,691.83	2,575.22	4,475.21	6,736.43	10,309.77
Andhra Pradesh	979.65	1,867.23	3,085.68	4,203.00	4,534.19	5,406.90
Telangana	973.41	1,286.98	3,592.09	3,953.12	4,666.03	4,842.10
Kerala	–	88.20	161.057	257.00	761.44	1,591.04
Karnataka	327.53	1,027.84	6,095.56	7,355.17	8,241.41	9,690.13
Puducherry	-	0.08	3.14	9.33	35.53	67.51
Bihar	95.91	108.52	142.45	159.51	192.89	328.34
Odisha	77.64	79.42	394.73	401.72	453.17	629.34
Jharkhand	17.51	23.27	34.95	52.06	105.84	199.87
West Bengal	23.07	26.14	75.95	149.84	179.98	320.62
Sikkim	0.01	0.00	0.01	0.07	4.68	7.56
Assam	11.18	11.78	22.40	42.99	147.92	212.34
Tripura	5.02	5.09	5.09	9.41	17.60	21.24
Arunachal Pradesh	0.27	0.27	5.39	5.61	11.64	14.85
Mizoram	0.10	0.10	0.50	1.53	28.01	30.39
Manipur	0.01	0.03	3.44	6.36	12.28	13.79
Meghalaya	0.01	0.01	0.12	0.12	4.15	4.28
Nagaland	0.50	0.50	1.00	1.00	3.04	3.17
Andaman and Nicobar	5.10	6.56	11.73	29.22	29.91	29.91
Lakshadweep	0.75	0.75	0.75	0.75	3.27	4.97
Others	58.31	58.31	0.00	0.00	45.01	45.01
Total India (MW)	6,762.85	12,288.83	28,180.66	40,085.37	66,780.36 (Note: Includes roof mounted and off-the-grid installations.)	107,945.61

Installed solar PV on 31 March
Year:	Cumulative capacity (in MW_{AC})
2010	161
2011	461
2012	1,205
2013	2,319
2014	2,632
2015	3,744
2016	6,763
2017	12,289
2018	21,651
2019	28,181
2020	34,627
2021	40,085
2022	56,951
2023	66,781
2024	81,813
2025	105,647
2026	157,046

=== Andhra Pradesh ===
The installed photovoltaic capacity in Andhra Pradesh was 4257 MW as of 30 September 2022. The state is planning to add 10,050 MW solar power capacity to provide power supply to the farming sector during the day time. The state has also offered five Ultra Mega Solar Power Projects with a total capacity of 12,200 MW to developers under renewable power export policy outside the state. Andhra Pradesh is endowed with abundant pumped hydroelectric energy storage to make available solar power in to round the clock power supply for meeting its ultimate energy needs. The state is planning to construct 33,000 MW pumped storage projects to mitigate the intermittency associated with renewable energy.

In 2015, NTPC agreed with APTransCo to install the 250-MW NP Kunta Ultra Mega Solar Power Project near Kadiri in Anantapur district. In October 2017, 1000 MW was commissioned at Kurnool Ultra Mega Solar Park which has become the world's largest solar power plant at that time. In August 2018, Greater Visakhapatnam commissioned a 2 MW Mudasarlova Reservoir grid-connected floating solar project which is the largest operational floating solar PV project in India. NTPC Simhadri has awarded BHEL to install a 25 MW floating solar PV plant on its water supply reservoir. APGENCO commissioned 400 MW Ananthapuram – II solar park located at Talaricheruvu village near Tadipatri.

=== Delhi ===
Delhi, the capital of India, has limitations in installing ground based solar power plants. However, it attempts to lead in rooftop solar powered plants installations by adopting a fully flexible net metering system. The installed solar power capacity was 211 MW as on 30 June 2022. The Delhi government announced that the Rajghat thermal power plant will be officially shut at the 45 acre plant site and turned into a 5 MW solar power PV plant.

=== Gujarat ===
Gujarat is one of India's most solar-developed states, with its total installed solar power generation capacity reaching 7,806 MW as of 30 June 2022. Gujarat has been a leader in solar-power generation in India due to its high solar-power potential, availability of vacant land, connectivity, transmission and distribution infrastructure and utilities. According to a report by the Low Emission Development Strategies Global Partnership (LEDS GP) report, these attributes are complemented by political will and investment. The 2009 Solar Power of Gujarat policy framework, financing mechanism and incentives have contributed to a green investment climate in the state and the targets for grid-connected solar power.

The state has commissioned Asia's largest solar park near the village of Charanka in Patan district, the Gujarat Solar Park-1. The park is generating 345 MW by March 2016 of its 500 MW total planned capacity and has been cited as an innovative and environmentally-friendly project by the Confederation of Indian Industry.In December 2018, 700 MW Solar PV plant at Raghanesda Solar Park is contracted at ₹2.89/unit levelised tariff.

To make Gandhinagar a solar-power city, the state government has begun a rooftop solar-power generation scheme. Under the scheme, Gujarat plans to generate 5 MW of solar power by putting solar panels on about 50 state-government buildings and 500 private buildings.

It also plans to generate solar power by putting solar panels along the Narmada irrigation canals. As part of this scheme, the state has commissioned the 1 MW Canal Solar Power Project on a branch of the Narmada Canal near the village of Chandrasan in Mehsana district. The pilot project is expected to stop 9,000,000 litres (2,000,000 imperial gallons; 2,400,000 US gallons) of water per year from evaporating from the Narmada River.

A 70 MW wind-solar hybrid power plant was commissioned in Gondal.

=== Haryana ===
The state government of Haryana has set a target installed capacity of 4.2 GW (including 1.6 GW solar roof top) via solar power by 2022 as it has high potential since it has at least 330 sunny days. Haryana is one of the fastest growing state in terms of solar energy with installed and commissioned capacity of 73.27 MW. Out of this, 57.88 MW was commissioned in FY 2016/17. Haryana solar power policy announced in 2016 offers 90% subsidy to farmers for the solar powered water pumps, which also offers subsidy for the solar street lighting, home lighting solutions, solar water heating schemes, solar cooker schemes. It is mandatory for new residential buildings larger than 500 square yards (420 m^{2}) to install 3% to 5% solar capacity for no building plan sanctioning is required, and a loan of up to ₹10 lakh is made available to the residential property owners. Haryana provides 100% waiver of electricity taxes, cess, electricity duty, wheeling charges, cross subsidy charges, transmission and distribution charges, etc. for rooftop solar projects.

In December 2018, Haryana had installed solar capacity of 48.80 MW, and in January 2019 Haryana floated tender for 300 MW grid-connected solar power, and additional 16 MW tender for the canal top solar power.

=== Karnataka ===
Karnataka is one of the highest solar power producing state in India with a total 7,597 MW installed capacity by the end of June 2022. The installed capacity of Pavagada Solar Park is 2050 MW by the end of year 2019 which was the world biggest solar park at that time.

=== Kerala ===
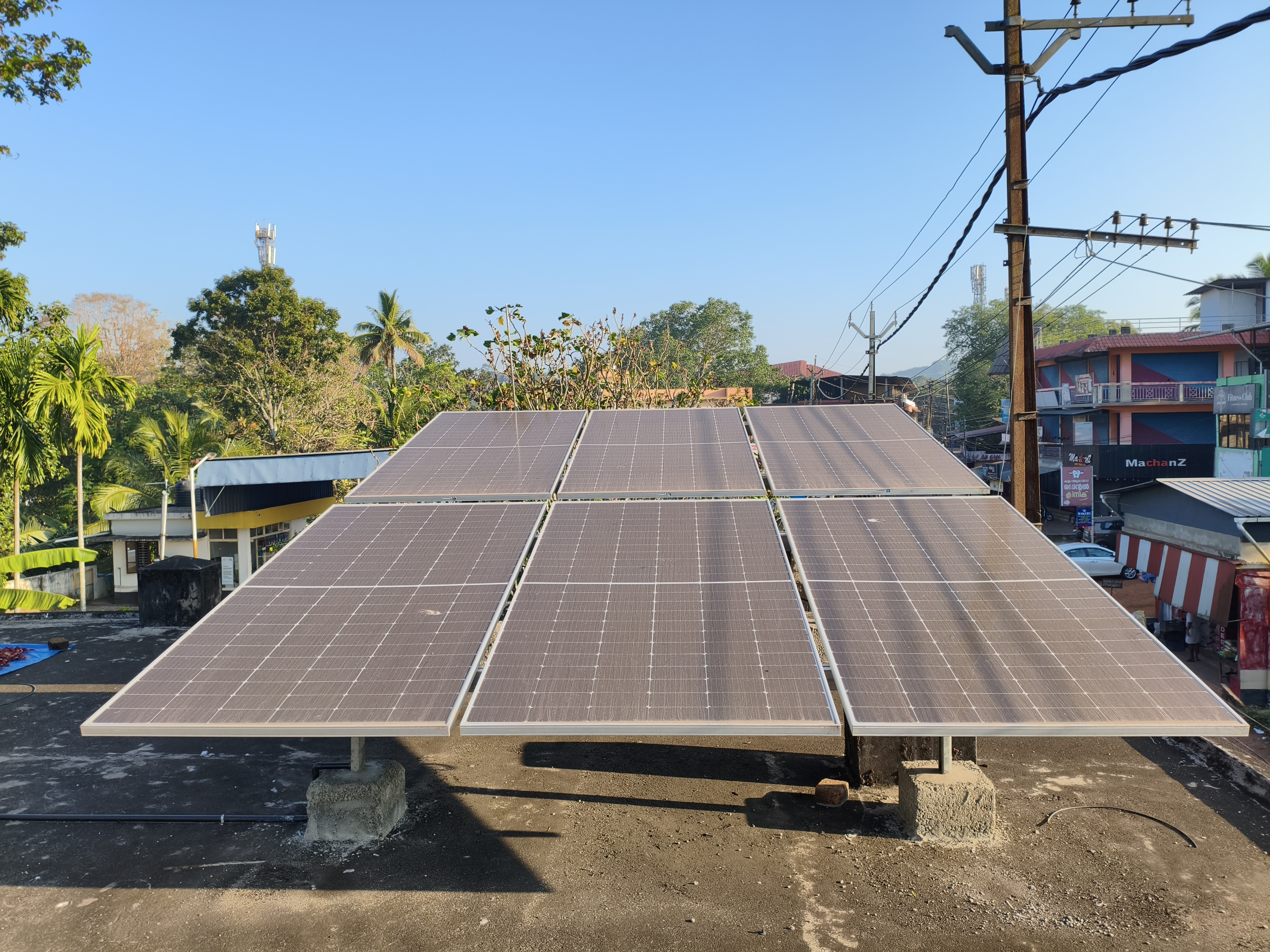
Rooftop solar panels (3KW) on a residence in Kerala.

The installed capacity of solar plants in Kerala as on 31 March 2023 is 761 MW. Kochi international airport is the first airport to run completely in solar energy. CIAL solar farm is responsible for it. There are plans to set up solar power plants in Idukki, Wayanad, Malappuram and Palakkad districts.

The first solar park in Kerala is located in Perla, Kasaragod. Floating Solar parks are being built and partly functional in Kayamkulam, Banasura Sagar, Idukki Dam and Vembanad Lake.

=== Ladakh ===
Ladakh, though a late entrant in solar power plants, is planning to install nearly 7,500 MW capacity in few years.

=== Madhya Pradesh ===
Madhya Pradesh had a total photovoltaic capacity of 1,117 MW by the end of July 2017. The Welspun Solar MP project, the largest solar-power plant in the state, was built at a cost of ₹11 billion (US$120 million) on 305 ha (3.05 km^{2}) of land and will supply power at ₹8.05 (8.6¢ US) per kWh. A 130 MW solar power plant project at Bhagwanpura, a village in Neemuch district, was launched by Prime Minister Narendra Modi. It is the largest solar producer, and Welspun Energy is one of the top three companies in India's renewable-energy sector. A planned 750 MW solar-power plant in Rewa district, the Rewa Ultra Mega Solar plant, was completed and inaugurated on 10 July 2020. Spread over 1,590 acres, it is Asia's largest solar power plant and was constructed at a cost of ₹4,500 crore. Madhya Pradesh I is a power plant under construction near Surajpur Village in the Shajapur district of Madhya Pradesh with 200 MW. It is scheduled to be operational by fall 2023.

=== Maharashtra ===
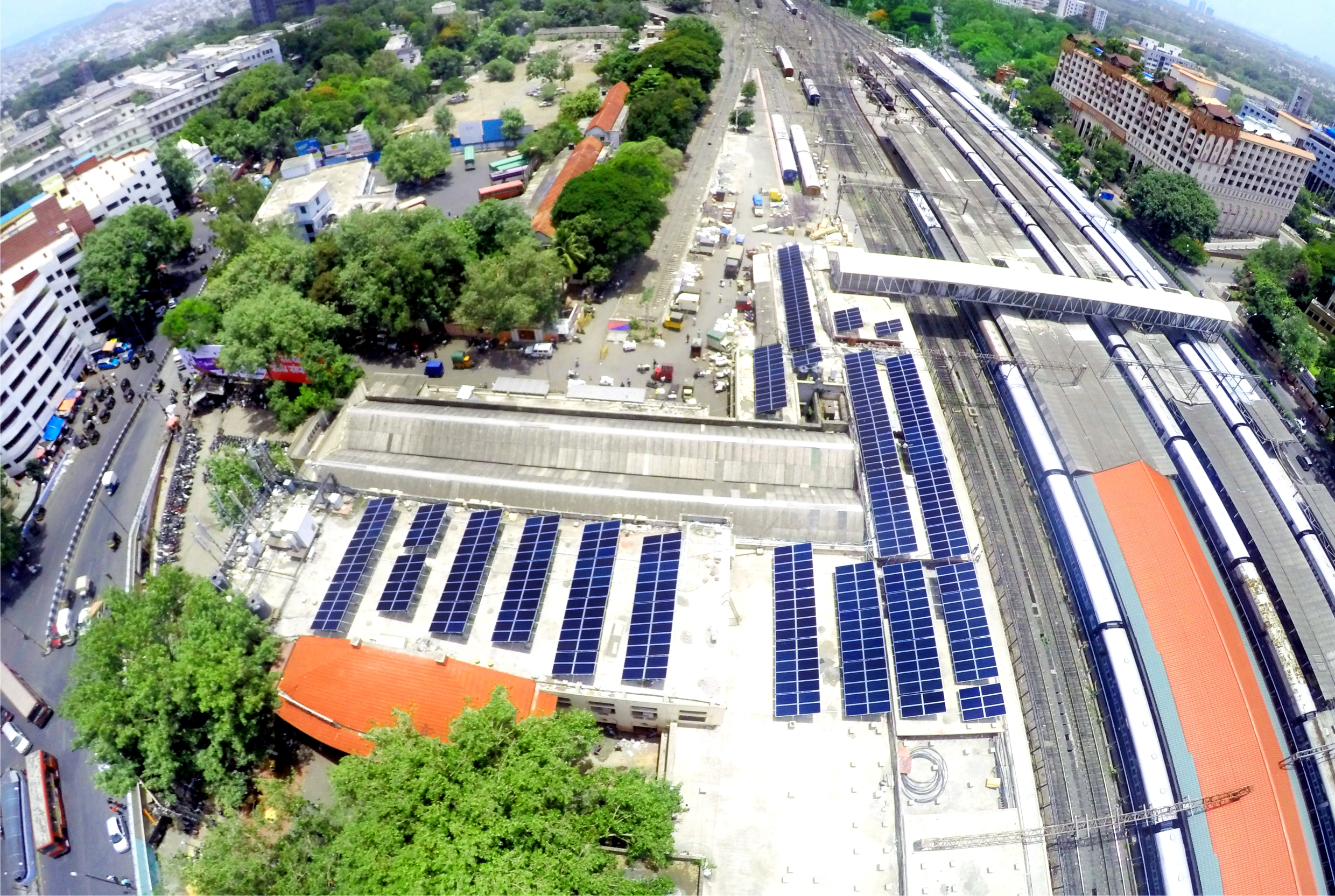
Rooftop solar panels at Pune Railway Station

The 125-MW Sakri solar plant is the largest solar-power plant in Maharashtra. The Shri Saibaba Sansthan Trust has the world's largest solar steam system. It was constructed at the Shirdi shrine at an estimated cost of ₹13.3 million (US$140,000), ₹5,840,000 (US$62,000) which was paid as a subsidy by the renewable-energy ministry. The system is used to cook 50,000 meals per day for pilgrims visiting the shrine, resulting in annual savings of 100,000 kg of cooking gas, and was designed to generate steam for cooking even in the absence of electricity to run the circulating pump. The project to install and commission the system was completed in seven months, and the system has a design life of 25 years. The Osmanabad region in Maharashtra has abundant sunlight, and is ranked the third-best region in India in solar insolation. A 10 MW solar power plant in Osmanabad was commissioned in 2013. According to reports published by the National Institute of Solar Energy (NISE), its aggregate solar power potential capacity is 64.32 GW.

=== Rajasthan ===
Rajasthan is one of India's most solar-developed states, with its total photovoltaic capacity reaching 28,761.22 MW by the end of March 2025. Rajasthan is also home to the world's largest Fresnel type 125 MW CSP plant at the Dhirubhai Ambani Solar Park. Jodhpur district leads the state with installed capacity of over 1,500 MW, followed by Jaisalmer and Bikaner.

The Bhadla Solar Park, with total installed capacity of 2,245 MW, is the 11th largest plant in the world as of October 2026.

The only tower type solar thermal power plant (2.5 MW) in India is located in Bikaner district.

In March 2019, the lowest tariff in India was ₹2.48/kWh for installing the 750 MW solar power plants in the state.

Rajasthan became the first state with 10GW of solar power capacity. It is targeting a capacity of 30 GW by financial year 2024–2025 and 75 GW by 2030.

=== Mizoram ===
The installed capacity of solar plants in Mizoram as on 31 March 2023 is 23 MW. Vankal Solar Park is the largest solar park in Mizoram.

=== Tamil Nadu ===
Tamil Nadu had the 5th highest operating solar-power capacity in India in May 2018. The total operating capacity in Tamil Nadu was 1.8 GW. On 1 July 2017, the solar power tariff in Tamil Nadu has hit an all-time low of ₹3.47 per unit when bidding for 1500 MW capacity was held.

The 648-MW Kamuthi Solar Power Project is the biggest operating project in the state. On 1 January 2018, NLC India Limited (NLCIL) commissioned a new 130 MW solar power project in Neyveli.

As of 2021, total installed capacity was at 4.3 GW, with plans for capacity to double by 2022.

=== Telangana ===
Telangana ranks sixth when it comes to solar energy generation capacity in India. The state has a solar power generation capacity of 3,953 MW and plans to achieve a capacity of 5,000 MW by 2022. In 2019, NTPC Ramagundam had placed work order on Bharat Heavy Electricals Limited (BHEL) to install 100 MW floating solar PV plant on its water supply reservoir. In July 2022, NTPC's 100 MW floating solar photovoltaic (PV) project becomes fully operational in Telangana and becomes India's largest floating solar plant equipped with cutting-edge technology and environmentally friendly features.

== Electricity generation ==
Annual solar power generation
Year	Solar power generation (TWh)
2013–14	3.36
2014–15	4.60
2015–16	7.45
2016–17	13.50
2017–18	25.87
2018–19	39.27
2019–20	50.13
2020–21	60.40
2021–22	73.48
2022–23	102.01
2023–24	115.98
2024–25	144.15
2025–26	174.76

Including ground-mounted, roof-mounted, hybrid and off-grid plants, the country's installed solar power capacity was 175.55_{AC} as of 31 October 2026. Solar electricity generation in 2025 increased by 53 terawatt-hour (TWh), a 37% increase from the previous year. Curtailment of solar power generation is happening when the power evacuation is not adequate, and by 2025 this happened in notable amounts (0.9 TWh in October) as other power plants had reached their limits of flexibility.

Monthly solar power generation, April 2022 – March 2023
Month	Regional solar power generation (GWh)					Total (GWh)
Month	North	West	South	East	North East	Total (GWh)
April 2022	3,208.06	1,632.07	3,376.37	92.37	15.04	8,323.92
May 2022	3,558.22	1,744.64	3,402.17	99.98	22.55	8,827.56
June 2022	3,447.78	1,538.53	3,177.10	78.58	17.92	8,259.91
July 2022	3,000.77	1,178.11	2,699.70	74.34	12.98	6,965.89
August 2022	3,136.11	1,216.88	2,972.50	75.70	27.07	7,428.25
September 2022	3,662.69	1,390.23	3,052.64	76.37	25.79	8,207.73
October 2022	3,835.41	1,657.49	3,123.65	88.36	21.92	8,726.83
November 2022	3,389.91	1,577.53	2,898.03	89.57	21.85	7,976.88
December 2022	3,436.29	1,564.96	3,098.10	85.72	22.44	8,207.51
January 2023	3,539.94	1,831.84	3,806.66	87.91	23.66	9,290.01
February 2023	3,733.67	1,977.84	3,726.01	98.09	19.80	9,555.41
March 2023	4,172.76	1,930.04	4,018.53	97.45	25.5	10,244.34
Total (GWh)	42,121.59	19,240.16	39,351.45	1,044.45	256.58	102,014.24

== Installations by application ==
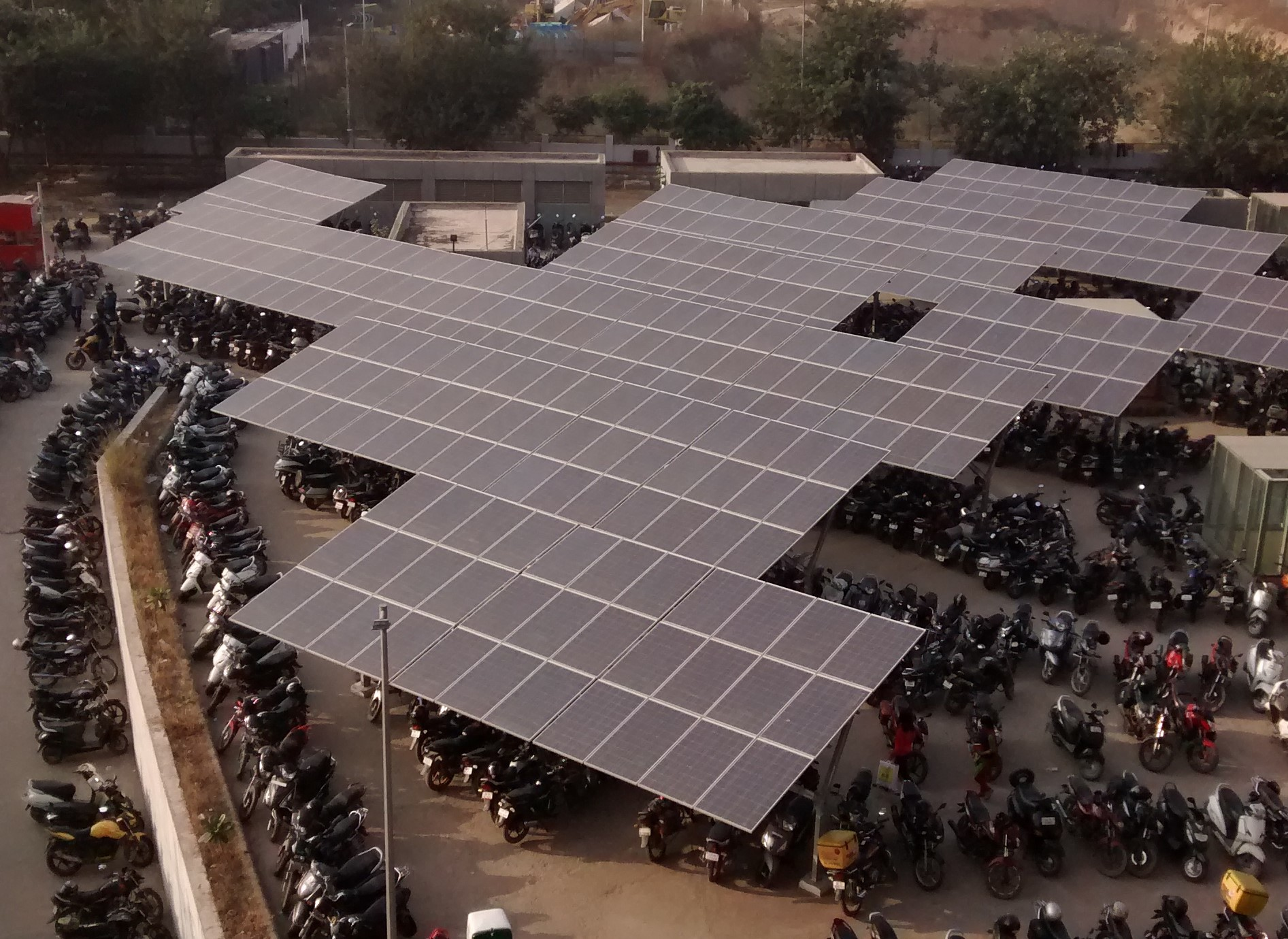
Solar panels at HUDA City Centre, Gurgaon

Photovoltaic (PV) installed capacity by application (MW_{AC})
Application	31 March 2024
Ground mounted including floating and hybrid.	66,980
Grid connected rooftop	11,870
Off-grid	2,960
TOTAL	81,810

The installed capacity is generally given in DC capacity at standard operating conditions. The actual AC power peak output at high voltage from a solar plant is between 65 and 75% of the rated DC capacity, after accounting for temperature coefficient, derating of solar cells capacity with time, losses in the total system, elevation of the plant, location of the plant, actual solar irradiance, etc. The AC peak power is also generally limited by the selected inverter's capacity for economic reasons.

As of September 2022, the rooftop solar power generation capacity is 8.3 GW. Rooftop solar can be divided into residential solar, commercial and industrial solar roofs as well as a range of installations including agricultural buildings, community and cultural centers. 70 per cent of rooftop solar in 2018 was in the industrial and commercial sectors, with just 20 per cent as residential rooftop solar. Rooftop solar as a proportion of total solar installations is much less than is typical in other leading solar countries but was forecast to grow to 40 GW by 2022 under national targets. A rough calculation would imply that India had around just 430 MW of residential rooftop solar, whilst the UK with around half the overall solar capacity of India had over 2,500 MW of residential solar in 2018. The smallest segment was off-grid solar at 1467 MW which could help play a role in reaching villages and dwellings without access to the national grid.

The open-access solar installation capacity reached 16.3 GW capacity as of June 2024.

== Concentrated solar power ==
The installed capacity of commercial concentrated solar power plants (non-storage type) in India is 227.5 MW with 50 MW in Andhra Pradesh and 177.5 MW in Rajasthan. The existing solar thermal power plants (non-storage type) in India, which are generating costly intermittent power on a daily basis, can be converted into storage type solar thermal plants to generate 3 to 4 times more base load power at cheaper cost and not depend on government subsidies. Concentrated solar power plants with thermal storage are also emerging as cheaper (US 5¢/kWh) and cleaner Load following power plants than fossil fuel power plants. In March 2024, SECI announced that a RfQ for 500 MW would be issued in the year 2024.

== Hybrid solar plants ==
Solar power, generated mainly during the daytime in the non-monsoon period, complements wind which generate power during the monsoon months in India. Solar panels can be located in the space between the towers of wind power plants. It also complements hydroelectricity, generated primarily during India's monsoon months. Solar-power plants can be installed near existing hydropower and pumped-storage hydroelectricity, using the existing power transmission infrastructure and storing the surplus secondary power generated by the solar PV plants. Floating solar plants on the reservoirs of pumped-storage hydroelectric plants are complementary to each other. Solar PV plants clubbed with pumped-storage hydroelectric plants are also under construction to supply peaking power.

During the daytime, the additional auxiliary power consumption of a solar thermal storage power plant is nearly 10% of its rated capacity for the process of extracting solar energy in the form of thermal energy. This auxiliary power requirement can be made available from cheaper solar PV plant by envisaging hybrid solar plant with a mix of solar thermal and solar PV plants at a site. Also to optimise the cost of power, generation can be from the cheaper solar PV plant (33% generation) during the daylight whereas the rest of the time in a day is from the solar thermal storage plant (67% generation from solar power tower and parabolic trough types) for meeting 24 hours baseload power. When solar thermal storage plant is forced to idle due to lack of sunlight locally during cloudy days in monsoon season, it is also possible to consume (similar to a lesser efficient, huge capacity and low cost battery storage system) the cheap excess grid power when the grid frequency is above 50 hz for heating the hot molten salt to higher temperature for converting stored thermal energy in to electricity during the peak demand hours when the electricity sale price is profitable.

== Solar heating ==
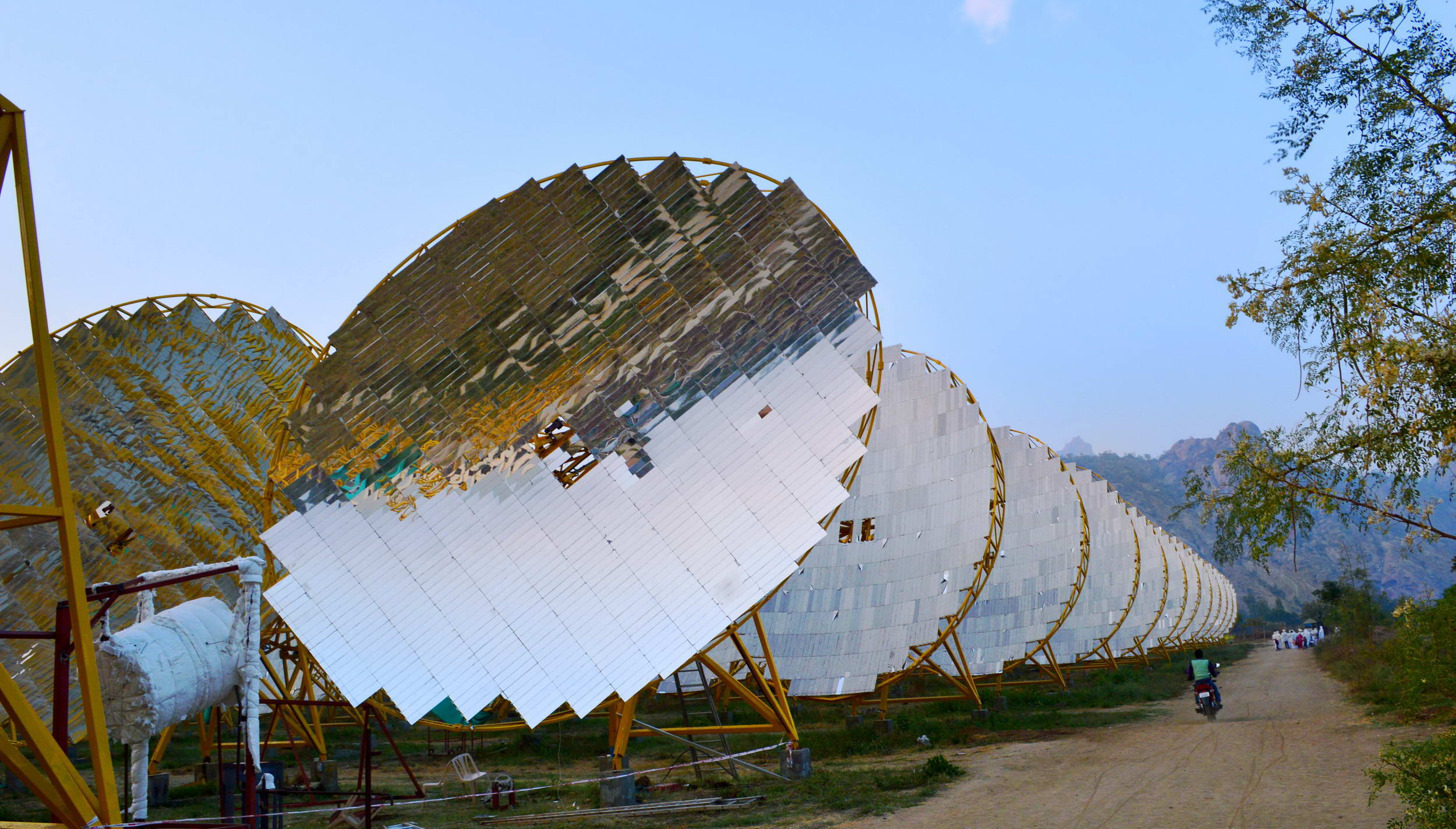
A solar heating plant in Rajasthan

Generating hot water or air or steam using concentrated solar reflectors, is increasing rapidly. Presently concentrated solar thermal installation base for heating applications is about 20 MW_{th} in India and expected to grow rapidly.

Bengaluru has the largest deployment of roof-top solar water heaters in India, generating an energy equivalent of 200 MW. It is India's first city to provide a rebate of ₹50 (53¢ US) on monthly electricity bills for residents using roof-top thermal systems, which are now mandatory in all new structures. Pune has also made solar water heaters mandatory in new buildings. Photovoltaic thermal (PVT) panels produce simultaneously the required warm water/air along with electricity under sunlight.

== Rural electrification ==
The lack of an electricity infrastructure is a hurdle to rural India's development. India's power grid is under-developed, with large groups of people still living off the grid. In 2004, about 80,000 of the nation's villages still did not have electricity, 18,000 out of them could not be electrified by extending the conventional grid due to inconvenience. A target of electrifying 5,000 such villages was set for the 2002–2007 Five-Year Plan. By 2004 more than 2,700 villages and hamlets were electrified, primarily with solar photovoltaic systems. The development of inexpensive solar technology is considered a potential alternative, providing an electricity infrastructure consisting of a network of local-grid clusters with distributed electricity generation. It could bypass (or relieve) expensive, long-distance, centralised power-delivery systems, bringing inexpensive electricity to large groups of people. In Rajasthan during Financial Year 2016–17, 91 villages have been electrified with a solar standalone system and over 6,200 households have received a 100 W solar home-lighting system.

India has sold or distributed about 12 lakh (1.2 million) solar home-lighting systems and 32 lakh (3.2 million) solar lanterns, and has been ranked the top Asian market for solar off-grid products.

=== Lamps and lighting ===
By 2012, a total of 4,600,000 solar lanterns and 861,654 solar-powered home lights were installed. Typically replacing kerosene lamps, they can be purchased for the cost of a few months' worth of kerosene with a small loan. The Ministry of New and Renewable Energy is offering a 30- to 40-percent subsidy of the cost of lanterns, home lights and small systems (up to 210 W_{p}). 2 crore (20 million) solar lamps are expected by 2022.

=== Agricultural support ===
Solar photovoltaic water-pumping systems are used for irrigation and drinking water. Most pumps are fitted with a 200–3,000 W (0.27–4.02 hp) motor powered with a 1,800 W_{p} PV array which can deliver about 140,000 litres (37,000 US gal) of water per day from a total hydraulic head of 10 m (33 ft). By 31 October 2019 a total of 181,521 solar photovoltaic water pumping systems were installed and total solar photovoltaic water pumping systems would reach 35 lakh (3.5 million) by the year 2022 under PM Kusum Scheme. During hot sunny daytime when the water needs are more for watering the fields, solar pumps performance can be improved by maintaining pumped water flowing/sliding over the solar panels to keep them cooler and clean. Agro photovoltaics is the electricity generation without losing agriculture production by using the same land. Solar driers are used to dry harvests for storage. Low cost solar powered bicycles are also available to ply between fields and village for agricultural activity, etc. On site/field, fertiliser is produced from air by solar power with no carbon emissions.

=== Rainwater harvesting ===
In addition to solar energy, rainwater is a major renewable resource of any area. In India, large areas are being covered by solar PV panels every year. Solar panels can also be used for harvesting most of the rainwater falling on them. Drinking or breweries water quality, free from bacteria and suspended matter, can be generated by simple filtration and disinfection processes, as rainwater is very low in salinity. Good quality water resources, closer to populated areas, are becoming a scarcity and increasingly costly for consumers. Exploitation of rainwater for value-added products like bottled drinking water makes solar PV power plants profitable even in high rainfall and cloudy areas by the increased income from drinking water generation.

== Refrigeration and air conditioning ==
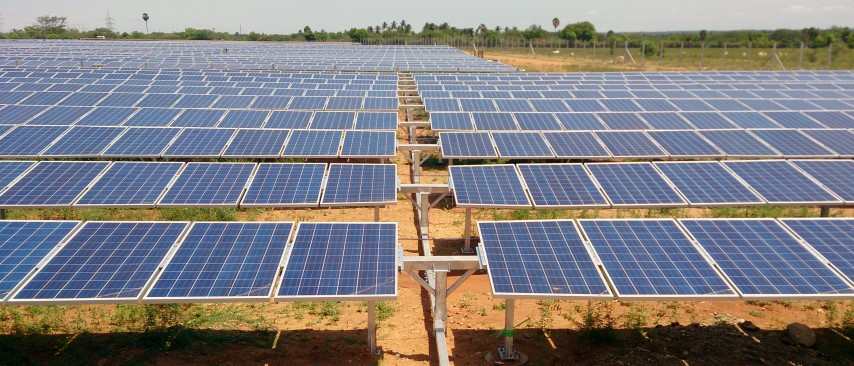
4 MW horizontal single-axis tracker in Vellakoil, Tamil Nadu

Residential electricity consumers who are paying higher slab rates more than ₹5 (5.3¢ US) per unit, can form into local groups to install collectively rooftop off-grid solar power units (without much battery storage) and replace the costly power used from the grid with the solar power as and when produced. Hence power draw from the grid which is an assured power supply without much power cuts nowadays, serves as a cheaper backup source when grid power consumption is limited to lower slab rate by using solar power during the day time. The maximum power generation of solar panels during the sunny daytime is complementary with the enhanced residential electricity consumption during the hot/summer days due to the higher use of cooling appliances such as fans, refrigerators, air conditioners, desert coolers, water heaters, etc. It would discourage Discoms to extract higher electricity charges selectively from its consumers. There is no need of any permission from Discoms similar to DG power sets installation. Cheaper discarded batteries of electric vehicle can also be used economically to store the excess solar power generated in the daylight.

Maximum solar-electricity generation during the hot hours of the day can be used for meeting residential air-conditioning requirements regardless of other load requirements, such as refrigeration, lighting, cooking, and water pumping. Power generation of photovoltaic modules can be increased by 17 to 20 per cent by equipping them with a tracking system.

In regions where peak electricity demand occurs in the evening, precooling of houses by increasing A/C settings in the afternoon as well as air conditioning systems combined with chilled water storage can increase the value of PV to the system and facilitate high shares of PV in total electricity generation. Using both options to better match AC electricity demand with PV electricity supply could increase cost-optimal shares of PV in total electricity by up to 15 percentage points.

== Grid stabilisation ==
Solar power PV plants are capable to provide fast frequency response in ramping up falling grid frequency. Solar-power plants equipped with battery storage systems where net energy metering is used can feed stored electricity into the power grid when its frequency is below the rated parameter (50 Hz) and draw excess power from the grid when its frequency is above the rated parameter. Excursions above and below the rated grid frequency occur about 100 times daily. The solar-plant owner would receive nearly double the price for electricity sent into the grid compared to that consumed from the grid if a frequency-based tariff is offered to rooftop solar plants or plants dedicated to a distribution substation. A power-purchase agreement (PPA) is not needed for solar plants with a battery storage systems to serve ancillary-service operations and transmit generated electricity for captive consumption using an open-access facility. Battery storage is popular in India, with more than 1 crore (10 million) households using battery backup during load shedding. Battery storage systems are also used to improve the power factor. Solar PV or wind paired with four-hour battery storage systems is already cost competitive, without subsidy and power purchase agreement by selling peak power in Indian Energy Exchange, as a source of dispatchable generation compared with new coal and new gas plants in India". Battery energy storage system cost have come down drastically in India for a mega storage capacity of 500 MW with four hours daily power supply (two round trip cycles per day) at full capacity.

India is experiencing morning peak power demand for nearly 6 months from November to April and the solar power generation from 6 am to 10 am is not adequate to meet morning peak demand as its availability peaks at midday time. However solar power panels can be oriented/fixed towards the south-eastern direction (nearly 10° towards the east from the south direction) to capture more sunlight for enhanced solar power generation during peak hours. Higher solar tariffs during morning hours enable the solar power plants to cater the maximum peak demand of the national grid reducing the load on peaking hydropower or load-following power plants. Combination of solar panels in different orientations on both sides of North-South line generates power for longer hours daily and undesirable peak output is dampened at the midday.

As the solar power plants remain idle during the night hours, reactive power capability of the inverters installed as part of the solar power plant can also be used during the night time for solving the problem of very high voltage which occurs due to low loads on the transmission lines.

Battery storage is also used economically to reduce daily/monthly peak power demand for minimising the monthly demand charges from the utility to the commercial and industrial establishments. Using batteries to shift PV electricity from times with very high generation (noon) to times with low generation (evening, night, morning) can increase the cost-optimal share of PV in the future Indian power system substantially, from 40 to 50% without batteries to 60–90% with batteries.

== Challenges and opportunities ==
The land price is costly for acquisition in India. Dedication of land for the installation of solar arrays must compete with other needs. The amount of land required for utility-scale solar power plants is about 1 km^{2} (250 acres) for every 40–60 MW generated. One alternative is to use the water-surface area on canals, lakes, reservoirs, farm ponds and the sea for large solar-power plants. Due to better cooling of the solar panels and the sun tracking system, the output of solar panels is enhanced substantially. These water bodies can also provide water to clean the solar panels. Conventional floating solar plants can only be installed on the dead storage area of a reservoir where water is always available. Floating solar plants installation cost has reduced steeply by 2018. Solar panels can also be installed economically above the maximum water level on the shallow sea and reservoirs (shallow live storage) area supported on piles. In January 2019, Indian Railways announced the plan to install 4 GW capacity along its tracks. Highways and railways may also avoid the cost of land nearer to load centers, minimizing transmission-line costs by having solar plants about 10 meters above the roads or rail tracks. Solar power generated by road areas may also be used for in-motion charging of electric vehicles, reducing fuel costs. Highways would avoid damage from rain and summer heat, increasing comfort for commuters. By using high efficiency monocrystalline silicon modules in an earth mount solar array, the cost of module supporting structures and the land requirement are reduced drastically without reduction in electricity generation. Earth mounted solar arrays can withstand category 4 hurricane and designed for water submergence condition. To reduce land footprint drastically where land cost is high, vertical installation of solar panels, in north-south orientation, forming a solar tower located on either side of roads, canals and rail tracks is also feasible. Bifacial solar panels in vertical configuration on rooftop is also feasible. The installed length of transmission lines of 66 kV and above is 649,833 km (403,788 mi) with nearly 20 lakh (2 million) truss type transmission towers. These transmission towers have nearly 50 GW solar PV potential (without any extra land footprint) @ 25 kW/tower if panels are installed on the south-facing facade at a safe distance from the conductors. Using micro-inverters for each solar panel would minimise the effect of shading that is caused for some duration by the transmission tower. Without the need to level the uneven land or maintaining the natural grading of a site, single axis trackers facilitate solar panels installation economically at optimum power generation.

The architecture best suited to most of India would be a set of rooftop power-generation systems connected via a local grid. Not only the rooftop area but also outer surface area of tall buildings can be used for solar PV power generation by installing PV modules in a vertical position in place of glass panels to cover facade area. Such an infrastructure, which does not have the economy of scale of mass, utility-scale solar-panel deployment, needs a lower deployment price to attract individuals and family-sized households. The cost of high efficiency and compact mono PERC modules and battery storage systems have reduced to make rooftop solar PV more economical and feasible in a microgrid. It is possible to generate more solar power during sunrise and sunset hours by using motionless trackers attachment to solar PV modules.

It is more economical to have multi-purpose floating solar PV power plants compared to single-purpose floating solar plants. Three tier boat houses are constructed on pontoons with the top tier (inclined roof up to 35 degrees) fully covered by solar panels (2.5 MW/acre area), bottom area (below the pontoon) for cage fish culture and middle two tiers one each for poultry and mushroom/orchid cultivation. Pontoon can have a tilting arrangement (another 35 degrees) to have inclined floating by varying water content in the ballast tanks to track the sun's direction for optimum solar power generation. Water is oxygenated in a evaporative cooler and used in cage cultivation with the power generated by the solar panels. The cold air at wet-bulb temperature from the evaporative cooler is used for cooling the poultry and mushroom areas. These boathouses can move to safer water depths with the variation in the water level of the water body or for avoiding occasional high winds. The excess power generated during the daytime is stored in a battery system mounted on a separate pontoon which can be moved to shore for feeding power to the grid during nighttime. Multipurpose solar plants can be installed at deeper (10 meters and more) water areas, unlike single-purpose floating solar PV plants. With multipurpose PV solar plants, the floating solar power potential of India enhances many times by using much of the inland water bodies area. Water is sprinkled over the solar panels to keep them cool and clean to optimise the power output. Rainwater harvesting can also be achieved by storing the water in collapsible bladders which can float on water for generating bottled drinking water.

Greenpeace recommends that India adopt a policy of developing solar power as a dominant component of its renewable-energy mix since, being a densely-populated country in the tropical belt, the subcontinent has an ideal combination of high insolation and a large potential consumer base. In one scenario India could make renewable resources the backbone of its economy by 2030, curtailing carbon emissions without compromising its economic-growth potential. A study suggested that 100 GW of solar power could be generated through a mix of utility-scale and rooftop solar, with the realisable potential for rooftop solar between 57 and 76 GW by 2024.

It is considered prudent to encourage solar-plant installations up to a threshold (such as 7,000 MW) by offering incentives. Otherwise, substandard equipment with overrated nameplate capacity may tarnish the industry. The power purchaser, transmission agency and financial institution should require capacity utilisation and long-term performance guarantees for the equipment backed by insurance coverage in the event that the original equipment manufacturer ceases to exist. Alarmed by the low quality of equipment, India issued draft quality guide lines in May 2017 to be followed by the solar plant equipment suppliers conforming to Indian standards. Secondary market for purchase of used solar panels is also available to replace the damaged solar panels which are out of production.

== Solar PV tariff ==
Price of silicon solar cells since 1977. In 2023, solar cell prices fell to 0.055 US$/watt.

=== Solar PV plus storage tariff ===
Battery pack prices have fallen to US$ 55 per kWh in May 2025 for intraday storage applications. With plummeting battery storage costs due to lower installation cost and drastic improvement in operating life of battery packs, it has become standard practice to opt for solar PV plus storage power plants instead of solar PV plants. In May 2025, energy storage auctions in India reveal record-low levelised tariffs for 25 years, with unsubsidized standalone battery storage bids at Rs 0.28 million/MW/month (two hours supply at a time) and solar plus storage bids at 3.1–3.5 INR/kWh. These price and performance levels are on par with those currently available in China and significantly below those in the United States (US) or the European Union (EU). These tariffs for meeting base/peak loads are below 50% of the tariffs applicable to new coal/gas and nuclear based power plants on levelised tariff basis.

In July 2025, the discovered levelised tariffs for 20 years, with standalone battery storage is at Rs 0.36 million/MW/month (four hours supply/day). The discovered tariff in August 2025 for firm dispatchable renewable electricity (FDRE) including interstate transmission charges and losses is 4.77 INR/kWh.

=== Tariff history ===
The average bid in reverse auctions in April 2017 is ₹3.15 (3.4¢ US) per kWh, compared with ₹12.16 (13¢ US) per kWh in 2010, which is around 73% drop over the time window. The current prices of solar PV electricity is around 18% lower than the average price of electricity generated by coal-fired plants. By the end of 2018, competitive reverse auctions, falling panel and component prices, the introduction of solar parks, lower borrowing costs and large power companies have contributed to the fall in prices. The cost of solar PV power in India, China, Brazil and 55 other emerging markets fell to about one-third of its 2010 price, making solar the cheapest form of renewable energy and cheaper than power generated from fossil fuels such as coal and gas.

India has the lowest capital cost per MW globally of installing solar power plants. However the global levelised cost of solar PV electricity fell to 1.04¢ US per kWh (₹0.77 per kWh) in April 2021, much cheaper than the lowest solar PV tariff in India. The intermittent / non-dispatchable solar PV at the prevailing low tariffs clubbed with Pumped-heat electricity storage can offer cheapest dispatchable power round the clock on demand.

The Indian government has reduced the solar PV power purchase price from the maximum allowed ₹4.43 (4.7¢ US) per KWh to ₹4.00 (4.3¢ US) per KWh, reflecting the steep fall in cost of solar power-generation equipment. The applicable tariff is offered after applying viability gap funding (VGF) or accelerated depreciation (AD) incentives. In January 2019, the time period for commissioning the solar power plants is reduced to 18 months for units located outside the solar parks and 15 months for units located inside the solar parks from the date of power purchase agreement.

Solar PV generation cost fell to ₹2.97 (3.2¢ US) per kWh for the 750 MW Rewa Ultra Mega Solar power project, India's lowest electricity-generation cost. In first quarter of calendar year 2020, large scale ground mounted solar power installations cost fell to ₹3.5 crore/MW by 12% in a year. Solar panel prices are lower than those of mirrors by unit area.

In an auction of 250 MW capacity of the second phase in Bhadla solar park, South Africa's Phelan Energy Group and Avaada Power were awarded 50 MW and 100 MW of capacity respectively in May 2017 at ₹2.62 (2.8¢ US) per kilowatt hour. The tariff is also lower than NTPC's average coal power tariff of ₹3.20 per kilowatt hour. SBG Cleantech, a consortium of SoftBank Group, Airtel and Foxconn, was awarded the remaining 100 MW capacity at a rate of ₹2.63 (2.8¢ US) per kWh. Few days later in a second auction for another 500 MW at the same park, solar tariff has further fallen to ₹2.44 (2.6¢ US) per kilowatt hour which are the lowest tariffs for any solar power project in India. These tariffs are lower than traded prices for day time in non-monsoon period in IEX and also for meeting peak loads on a daily basis by using cheaper solar PV power in pumped-storage hydroelectricity stations indicating there is no need of any power purchase agreements and any incentives for the solar PV power plants in India. Solar PV power plant developers are forecasting that solar power tariff would drop to ₹1.5 (1.6¢ US) /unit in near future.

The lowest solar tariff in May 2018 is Rs 2.71/kWh (without incentives) which is less than the tariff of Bhadla solar park (₹2.44 per kWh with VGF incentive) after the clarification that any additional taxes are pass through cost with hike in the tariff. In early July 2018 bids, the lowest solar PV tariff has touched ₹2.44 (2.6¢ US) per kWh without viability gap funding incentive. In June 2019, the lowest tariff is ₹2.50 (2.7¢ US)/kWh for feeding in to the high voltage interstate transmission system (ISTS). In February 2019, the lowest solar power tariff is ₹1.24 (1.3¢ US) per kWh for 50 MW contracted capacity at Pavagada Solar Park.

The tariff for rooftop installations is also falling with the recent offer of ₹3.64 (3.9¢ US) with 100% locally made components. In August 2022, the installation cost of rooftop solar has reduced below 45,000 Rs/KW for capacity between 1 and 3 kW.

In May 2020, the discovered first-year tariff is ₹2.90 (3.1¢ US) per kWh with ₹3.60 (3.8¢ US) per kWh levelised tariff for round-the-clock hybrid renewable power supply. In November 2020, Solar PV power tariff has fallen to ₹2.00 (2.1¢ US) per kWh.

In March 2021, the discovered levelised tariff was ₹2.20 (2.4¢ US) per kWh after the imposition of basic customs duty (BCD) on imported solar PV panels and cells. The discovered tariff for floating solar power was ₹3.70 (4.0¢ US) per kWh in November 2022.

In April 2023, the discovered minimum levelised tariff was ₹3.99 (4.3¢ US) per kWh for the round-the-clock hybrid solar power supply with or without storage. In April 2023, the discovered minimum tariff for solar power was ₹2.55 (2.7¢ US) per kWh. In 2023, the minimum levelised tariff (₹/kWh) was ₹2.51 (2.7¢ US).

In December 2023, solar module prices in China fallen steeply below 0.15 US$/watt and solar cell prices below 0.055 US$/watt. The cost of imported solar cells is only 1/6 of the total project cost. However, Indian made solar module prices are at least 50% more than the prices of modules made in China. The imported cost component of solar power plants is less than the imported cost component of fossil fuel based power plants in India and it would reduce further in few years with the indigenous production capacity in pipeline. A record 69+ GW of renewable energy (mostly solar) tenders were issued in FY 2023-24, surpassing the government-mandated target of 50GW. Average capital cost of large scale solar plants have fallen drastically below ₹ 35 million per MW in 2024.

In October 2024, solar power levelised tariff has fallen to 0.013 US$/kWh compared to ₹2.5 (2.7¢ US) discovered in Indian currency. In December 2024, the response by the bidders for the solar PV was not satisfactory and the levelised tariff has increased to ₹3.10 (3.3¢ US) per kWh due to mandatary use of locally produced solar PV panels/modules. Meanwhile, China has enhanced export price of polysilicon material by 5 times over the local price to protect its profit margins on entire downstream production chain since it is the monopoly in production of solar grade polysilicon.

== Government support ==
The Indian government announced an allocation of ₹10 billion (US$110 million) for the National Solar Mission and a clean-energy fund for the 2010–11 fiscal year, an increase of ₹3.8 billion (US$41 million) from the previous budget. The budget encouraged private solar companies by reducing the import duty on solar panels by five per cent. This is expected to reduce the cost of a rooftop solar-panel installation by 15 to 20 per cent.

The Indian government is giving subsidies for installing rooftop solar panels in an effort to increase the adoption of solar power in the country. Rooftop solar panels have numerous benefits, including the ability to generate electricity directly from the source, reducing dependence on fossil fuels, and lowering electricity bills for households and businesses. In addition, rooftop solar panels help to reduce carbon emissions, making them a key component in India's efforts to combat climate change. With the availability of government subsidies, more households and businesses can now afford to install rooftop solar panels, contributing to a more sustainable future for the country.

=== Incentives ===
At the end of July 2015, the chief incentives were:

1. Viability Gap Funding: Under the reverse bidding process, bidders who need least viability gap funding at the reference tariff (RS 4.93 per unit in 2016) is selected. Funding was ₹1 Crore/MW for open projects on average in 2016.
2. Depreciation: For profit-making enterprises installing rooftop solar systems, 40 per cent of the total investment could be claimed as depreciation in the first year (decreasing taxes).
3. Liberal external commercial borrowing facility for the solar power plants.
4. To protect the local solar panel manufacturers, 25% safe guard duty is imposed for two years period from August 2018 on the imports from China & Malaysia who are suspected of dumping solar panels in to India.
5. Capital subsidies were applicable to rooftop solar-power plants up to a maximum of 500 kW. The 30 per cent subsidy was reduced to 15 per cent.
6. Renewable Energy Certificates (RECs): Tradeable certificates providing financial incentives for every unit of green power generated.
7. Net metering incentives depend on whether a net meter is installed and the utility's incentive policy. If so, financial incentives are available for the power generated.
8. Assured Power Purchase Agreement (PPA): The power-distribution and -purchase companies owned by state and central governments guarantee the purchase of solar PV power when produced only during daylight. The PPAs offer fair market determined tariff for the solar power which is a secondary power or negative load and an intermittent energy source on a daily basis.
9. Interstate transmission system (ISTS) charges and losses are not levied during the period of PPA for the projects commissioned before 31 March 2022.
10. Union government offers 70% and 30% subsidy for the hill states and other states respectively for the installation of rooftop solar units. Additional incentives are offered to rooftop solar power plants from various state governments.
11. 100% foreign direct investment (FDI) is automatically permitted, subject to the provisions of The Electricity Act, 2003, to install solar power plants.

=== Indian initiative of International solar alliance ===
In January 2016, Prime Minister Narendra Modi and French President François Hollande laid the foundation stone for the headquarters of the International Solar Alliance (ISA) in Gwal Pahari, Gurugram. The ISA will focus on promoting and developing solar energy and solar products for countries lying wholly or partially between the Tropic of Cancer and the Tropic of Capricorn. The alliance of over 120 countries was announced at the Paris COP21 climate summit. One hope of the ISA is that wider deployment will reduce production and development costs, facilitating the increased deployment of solar technologies to poor and remote regions.

== Solar-panel manufacturing in India ==
As of December 2023, manufacturing capacity of solar cells and solar modules in India was 6 GW and 37 GW respectively. The production capacity is expected to be 25 GW for solar cells and 60 GW for solar modules by the end of 2025. India has similar advantages in total solar panels manufacturing process by importing solar ingots grade silica from USA similar to China as the industrial wages and electricity costs are cheaper than in China. India is also exporting quartz to China which is used for making metallurgical silica and further converted to polysilicon ingots. Nearly 80 per cent of solar-panel's weight is flat glass. Nearly 50 tons of flat glass is used to manufacture a MW of solar panels. Low-iron flat or float glass is manufactured from soda ash and iron-free silica. Soda-ash manufacturing from common salt is an energy-intensive process unless it is extracted from soda lakes or glasswort cultivation in alkali soil. To increase installation of photovoltaic solar-power plants, the production of flat glass and its raw materials must expand commensurately to eliminate supply constraints or future imports.

The Ministry of New and Renewable Energy (MNRE), India, has issued a memorandum to ensure the quality of solar cells and solar modules. Compliance with the requisite specifications will grant manufacturers and their specific products an entry in the ALMM (Approved List of Models and Manufacturers.) Indian manufacturers are gradually enhancing the production capacity of monocrystalline silicon PERC cells to supply better performing and enduring solar cells to local market. India's solar panel sector is expected to be self-sufficient by 2026. In May2024, India started production of ingots, that are converted into solar cells, from imported polysilicon.

For utility-scale solar projects, top solar module suppliers in 2025–26 are: UTL Solar, Waaree Energies Ltd., Trina Solar, JA Solar, Canadian Solar, Risen, Vikram Solar Ltd. and Hanwha.

== Major photovoltaic power stations ==
Below is a list of solar power generation facilities with a capacity of at least 20 MW.

Major photovoltaic (PV) power plants
Plant	State	Coordinates	DC peak power (MW)	Year comm- issioned	Notes	Ref
Adani Green Solar Park	Gujarat	24°10′04.41″N 69°34′09.79″E	2,250	2024		
Bhadla Solar Park	Rajasthan	27°32′22.81″N 71°54′54.91″E	2,245	2020	World's biggest solar park in terms of generation and second largest in terms of area as of March 2020	
Pavagada Solar Park	Karnataka	14°15′7″N 77°26′51″E	2,050	2019	Second biggest solar park in the world and world's largest in terms of area as in March 2020	
Kurnool Ultra Mega Solar Park	Andhra Pradesh	15.681522°N 78.283749°E	1,000	2017		
NP Kunta	Andhra Pradesh	14°01′N 78°26′E	978	2021	In Nambulapulakunta Mandal. Total planned capacity 1500 MW	
Rewa Ultra Mega Solar	Madhya Pradesh	24°28′49″N 81°34′28″E	750	2018		
Charanka Solar Park	Gujarat	23°54′N 71°12′E	690	2012	Situated at Charanka village in Patan district. Capacity expected to go up to 790 MW in 2019.	
Kamuthi Solar Power Project	Tamil Nadu	9.347568°N 78.392162°E	648	2017	With a generating capacity of 648 MW_{p} at a single location, it is the world's 12th largest solar park based on capacity.	
Gujarat solar park 1	Gujarat	23°54′N 71°12′E	221	2012		
Ananthapuramu – II	Andhra Pradesh	14°58′49″N 78°02′45″E	400	2019	Located at Talaricheruvu village in Tadipatri mandal of Anantapur district. Planned capacity 500 MW	
Galiveedu solar park	Andhra Pradesh	14°6′21″N 78°27′57″E	400	2020	Located at Marrikommadinne village in Galiveedu mandal of kadapa district.	
Mandsaur Solar Farm	Madhya Pradesh	24°5′17″N 75°47′59″E	250	2017		
Kadapa Ultra Mega Solar Park	Andhra Pradesh	14°54′59″N 78°17′31″E	250	2020	Total planned capacity 1000 MW	
Welspun Solar MP project	Madhya Pradesh		151	2014		
ReNew Power, Nizamabad	Telangana		143	2017		
Neyveli Solar Power Project	Tamil Nadu		130	2018	The project is spread over 4 locations within the town.	
Sakri solar plant	Maharashtra		125	2013		
NTPC solar plants NTPC Bhadla Solar Power Plant			110	2015		
Maharashtra I	Maharashtra		67	2017		
Green Energy Development Corporation (GEDCOL)	Odisha		50	2014		
Tata Power Solar (TPS), Rajgarh	Madhya Pradesh		50	2014		
Welspun Energy, Phalodhi	Rajasthan		50	2013		
Jalaun Solar Power Project	Uttar Pradesh		50	2016		
GEDCOL	Odisha		48	2014		
CIAL Solar Power Project	Kerala		40	2013	Powering first fully solar powered airport in the world	
Karnataka I	Karnataka		40	2018		
Bitta Solar Power Plant	Gujarat		40	2012		
Dhirubhai Ambani Solar Park, Pokhran	Rajasthan		40	2012		
Vikram Solar and IL&FS Energy Development Co Ltd	Madhya Pradesh		40	2015		
Rajasthan Photovoltaic Plant	Rajasthan		35	2013		
Welspun, Bathinda	Punjab		34	2015		
Moser Baer, Patan district	Gujarat		30	2011		
Lalitpur Solar Power Project	Uttar Pradesh		30	2015		
Mithapur Solar Power Plant	Gujarat		25	2012		
Vankal Solar Park	Mizoram		20	2023		
GEDCOL	Odisha		20	2014		

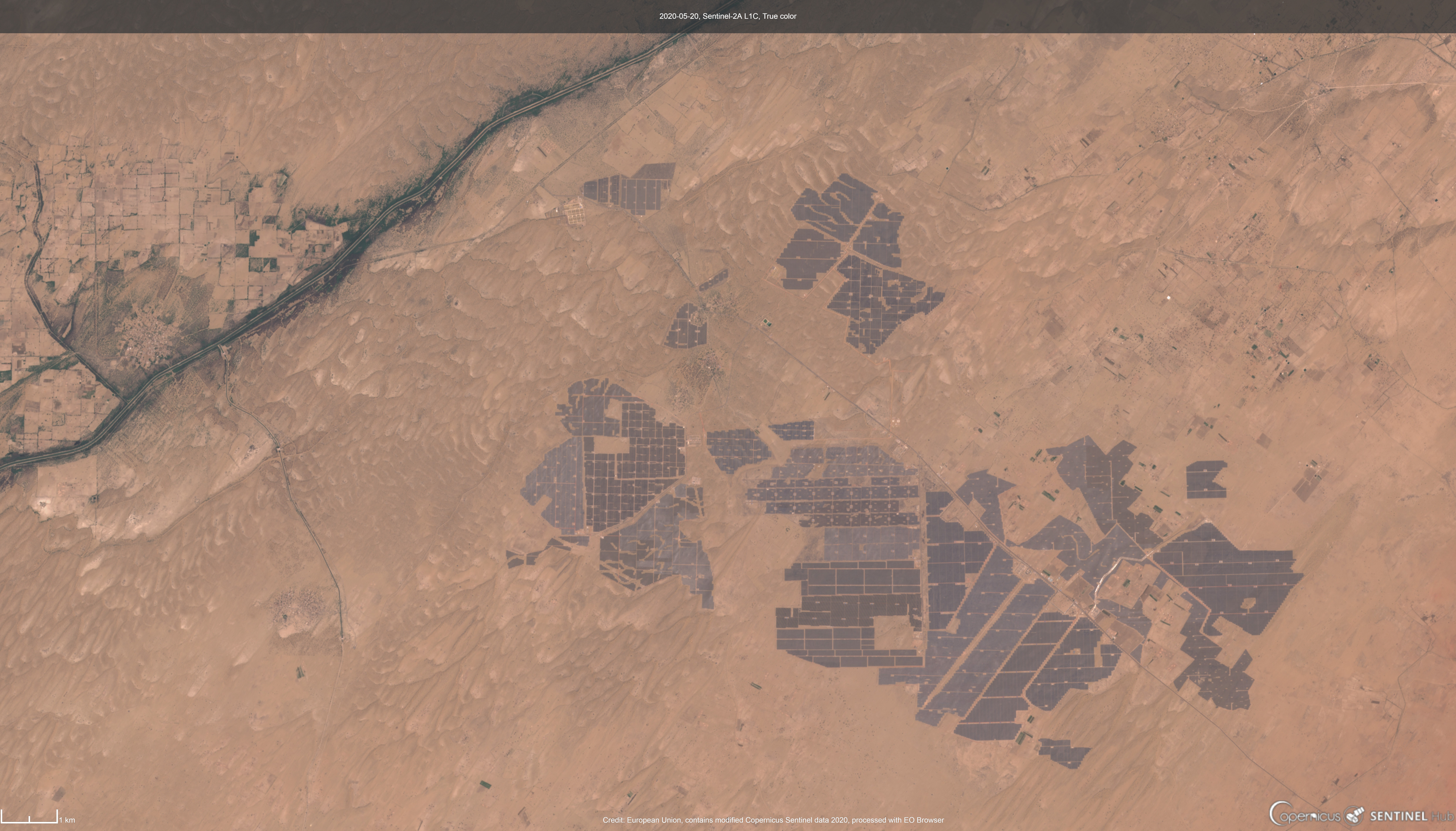
Bhadla Solar Park, Rajasthan 2,245 MW 27°32′22.81″N 71°54′54.91″E

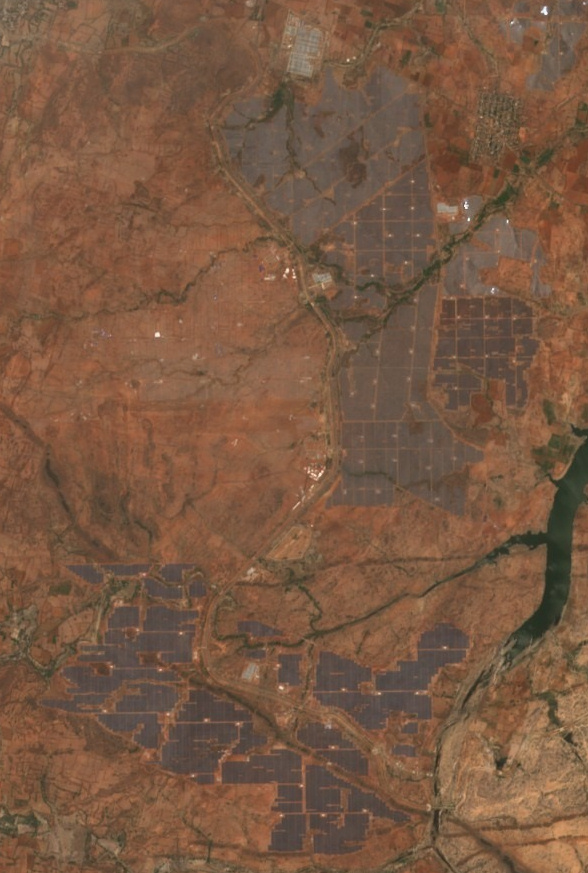
NP Kunta Ultra Mega Solar Park, Andhra Pradesh 978 MW 14°01′N 78°26′E

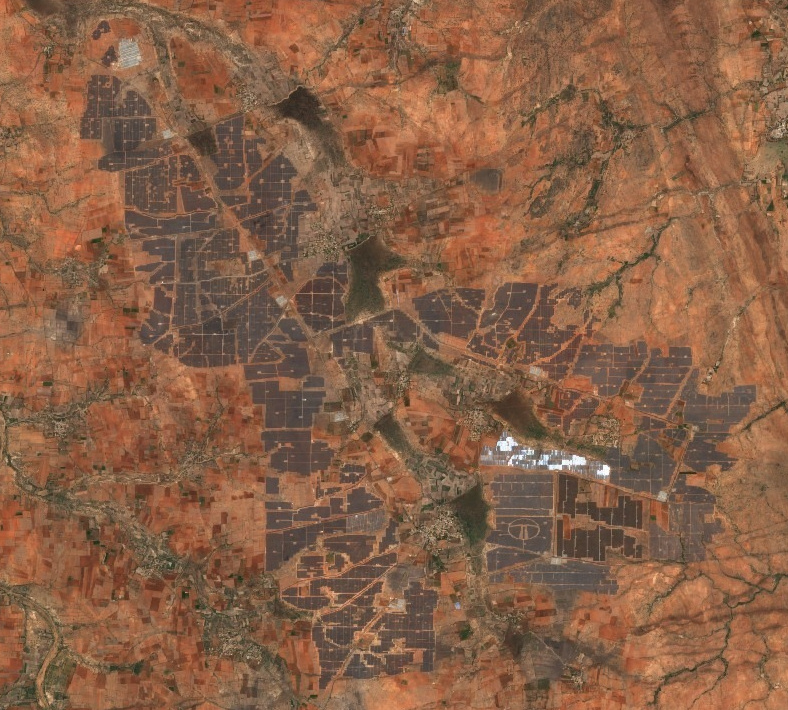
Pavagada Solar Park, Karnataka 2,050 MW 14°15′7″N 77°26′51″E

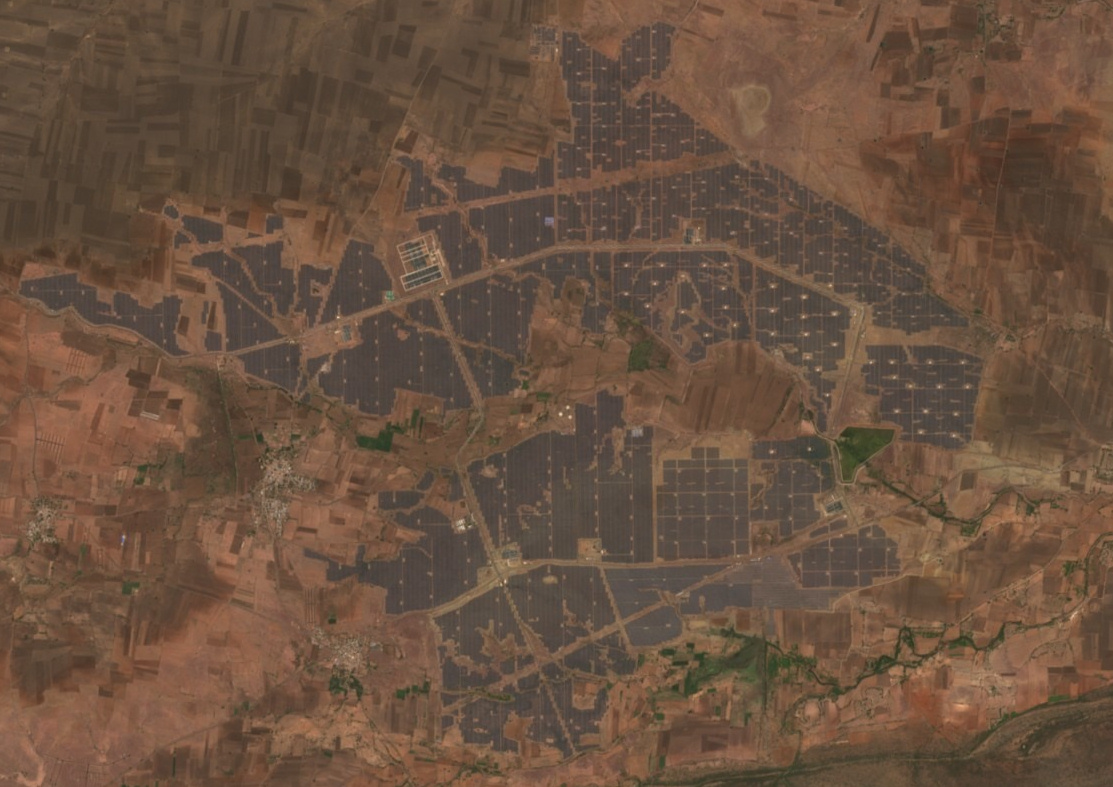
Kurnool Ultra Mega Solar Park, Andhra Pradesh 1,000 MW 15.681522°N 78.283749°E

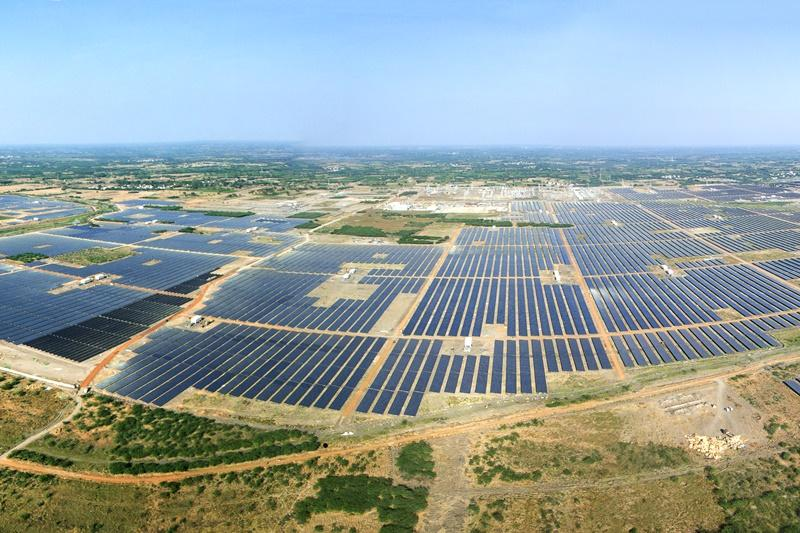
Kamuthi Solar Power Project, Tamil Nadu 648 MW 9.347568°N 78.392162°E

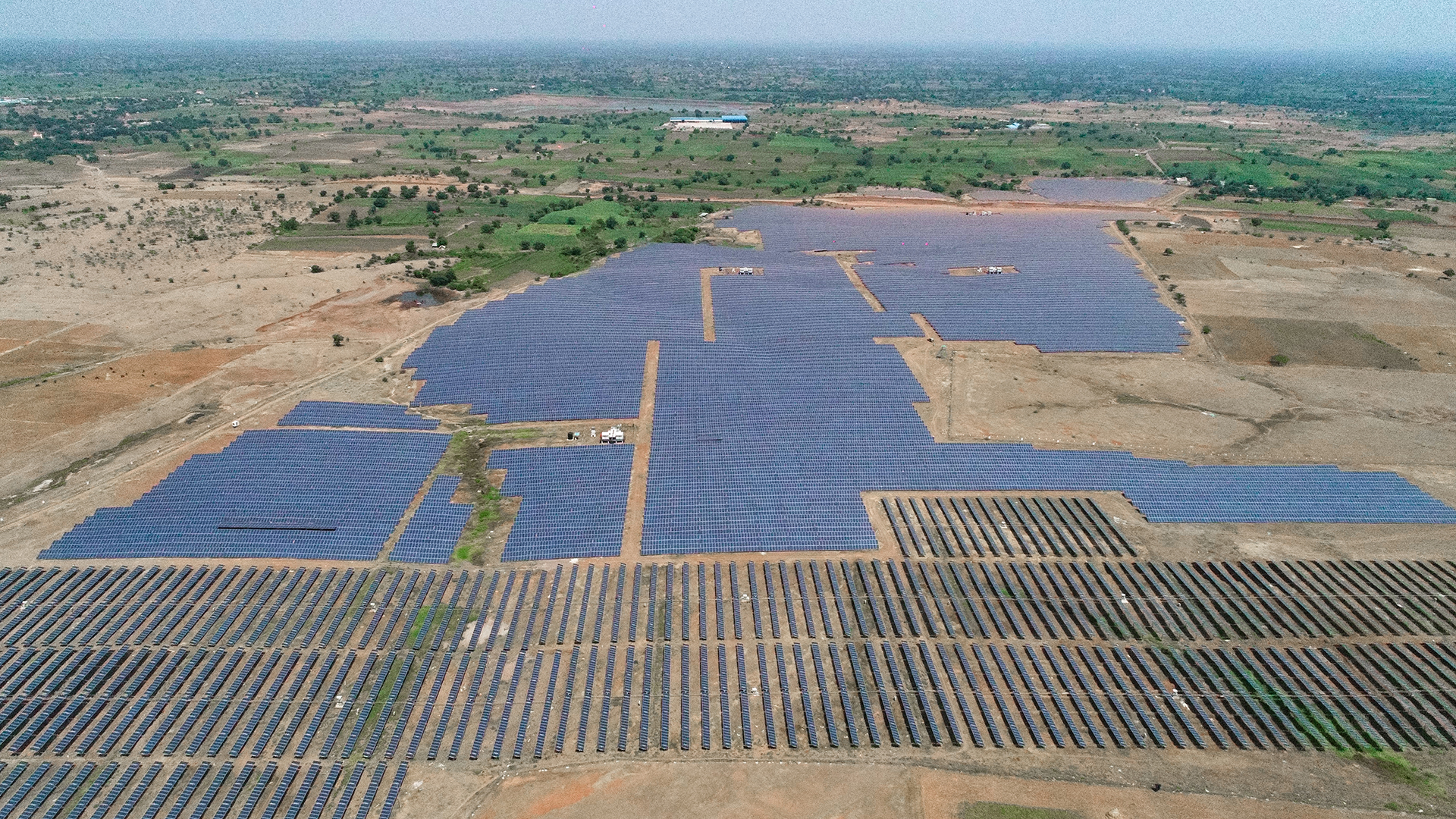
Maharashtra I Solar Power Plant, Maharashtra 67 MW

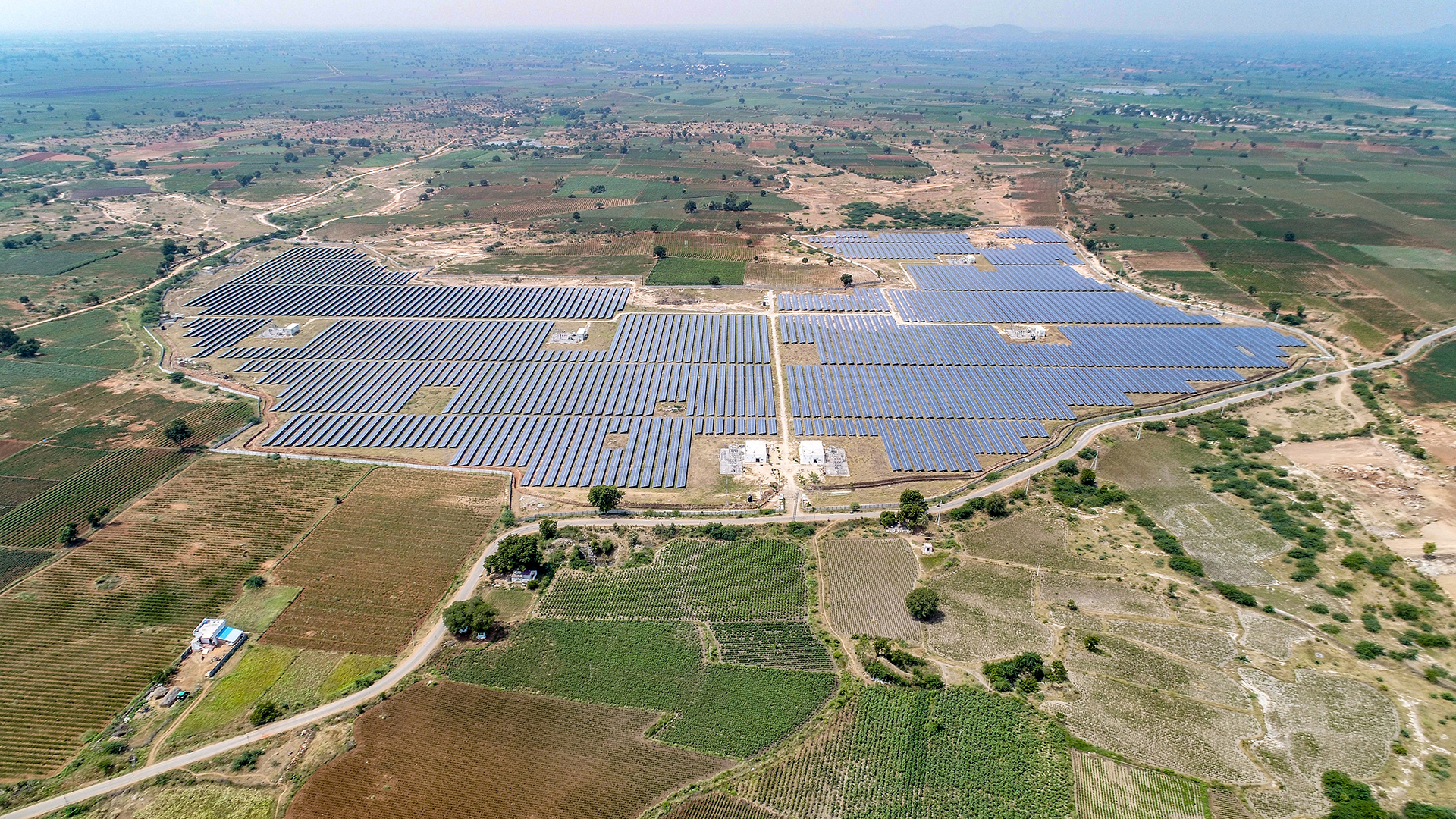
Telangana I Solar Power Plant, Telangana 12 MW

== See also ==
- Renewable energy in India
- Electricity sector in India
- Energy policy of India
- Cost of electricity by source
- Wind power in India
- Biofuels in India
- Hydroelectric power in India
- Growth of photovoltaics
- Index of solar energy articles
- Solar power in China
