= Jalaun Solar Power Project =

- Country: India
- Status: Operational
- Commission date: 27 Jan 2016
- Owner: Essel Infraprojects Limited

Solar farm
- Type: Flat-panel PV

Power generation
- Nameplate capacity: 50 MW

Jalaun Solar Power Project is a solar photo-voltaic power generating station spanning two villages of Kuhana and Shajahanpur in Jalaun district of Uttar Pradesh. The plant has been developed by Essel Infraprojects Limited, an arm of Essel Group. The plant is spread on a 250-acre land and is expected to generate 85 million units per year and connected to 132 KV Sarsela-Kalpi substations.

The plant was inaugurated by U.P. chief minister Akhilesh Yadav on 27 January 2016 under the Uttar Pradesh Solar Power Policy 2013. A Power Purchase Agreement (PPA) between U.P. Government and Essel Infraprojects Limited has been signed which is valid for 25 years.

== See also ==
- Solar power in India
- Renewable energy in India
