= Tata Power Solar =

Indian solar energy company

Tata Power Solar Systems Limited
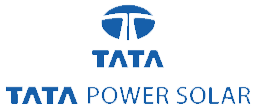
- Formerly: Tata BP Solar India Limited
- Company type: Subsidiary
- Industry: Solar power
- Founded: 1989; 37 years ago
- Founders: Tata Power; BP Solar
- Headquarters: Shatabdi Bhavan, Sector 4, Noida, Uttar Pradesh, India
- Area served: Worldwide
- Parent: Tata Group
- Website: tatapowersolar.com

Tata Power Solar Systems Limited, formerly Tata BP Solar, is an Indian company that specialises in solar energy services. The company manufactures solar modules, solar cells, and other solar products, and provides EPC services for solar power projects.

In February 2017, Tata Power Solar became the first Indian company to ship over 1 GW solar modules worldwide. The company's manufacturing unit in Bangalore has a production capacity of 400 MW of modules and 300 MW of cells.

== History ==
Tata Power and BP Solar established Tata BP Solar, a joint venture company, in 1989. The company began commercial operations in 1991 by establishing its first manufacturing unit with a production capacity of 3 MW.

BP Solar was closed on 21 December 2011, when BP announced its departure from the solar energy business. On 30 August 2012, Tata BP Solar India Limited was renamed as Tata Power Solar Systems Limited and became a wholly owned subsidiary of the Tata Group.

In August 2016, Tata Power Solar commissioned a 100 MW solar project at the NP Kunta Ultra Mega Solar Power Project in Anantapur, Andhra Pradesh. This was the largest solar project commissioned using domestically manufactured solar cells and modules at the time.

In 2022, Tata Power Solar raised 4,000 crore from Tata Power and a consortium of investors led by BlackRock, which also includes the Mubadala Investment Company.

== Rooftop ==
Tata Power Solar also undertakes solar rooftop EPC projects. The company commissioned an 820.8 kWp solar rooftop at the Cricket Club of India (Brabourne Stadium) in Mumbai, claiming to be the world’s largest solar rooftop on a cricket stadium.

== See also ==
- Solar power in India
- Solar Energy Corporation of India
- Azure Power
