= Dayadara =

- village
- Location within Gujarat Location within India
- Coordinates: 21°48′09″N 72°55′46″E
- Country: India

Population (2015)
  - Total: In excess of 5,000
- Demonym: Gujarati

Official language
  - Official language: Gujarati
  - Spoken languages: Gujarati
- Time zone: UTC+05:30 (IST)

Dayadara is a village in Bharuch District, Gujarat, India. It has an area of about 2.53 km^{2} (0.98 sq mi) and a population in excess of 5000.

Two villages Dayadara and Bakroli amalgamated into one village called Dayadara.

== Schools ==
- The Dayadara Higher Secondary School
- Dayadara Kumar (Boys) Shala
- Dayadara Kanya (Girls) Shala
