= Solar Energy Corporation of India =

Indian government company

Solar Energy Corporation of India Ltd.
- Type: Public sector undertaking
- Industry: Solar energy
- Founded: 9 September 2011; 14 years ago
- Headquarters: 6th Floor, Plate-B, NBCC Office Block Tower-2, East Kidwai Nagar, New Delhi - 110023, India
- Area served: India
- Net income: ₹ 511 crore (2023)
- Parent: Ministry of New and Renewable Energy
- Website: www.seci.co.in

Solar Energy Corporation of India Ltd. (SECI) is a public sector undertaking under the Ministry of New and Renewable Energy, Government of India, established to facilitate the implementation of the National Solar Mission (NSM). The company's mandate has been broadened to cover the entire renewable energy domain. The company attained Navratna status in 2024, which allows the organisation to undertake substantial investments of up to ₹1,000 crore without needing approval from the centre. SECI has also been designated as one of the Renewable Energy Implementing Agencies (REIA) by the Government for the addition and expansion of Renewable Energy capacity in the country.

The company is responsible for implementation of several government schemes, major ones being the VGF schemes for large-scale grid-connected projects under NSM, solar park scheme and grid-connected solar rooftop scheme, along with a host of other specialised schemes.

In addition, SECI has ventured into solar project development on a turnkey basis for several PSUs. The company also has a power-trading licence and is active in this domain through trading of solar power from projects set up under the schemes being implemented by it. IREDA, REC, and Tusco Ltd. are some of the public sector rivals in the same space.

== Background ==
SECI was incorporated in the year 2011 as a not-for-profit company (Sec 25 of the Companies Act, 1956) and converted to a commercial company in 2015 (Sec 3 of the Companies Act, 2013). SECI releases tenders for the selection of Renewable Energy (RE) developers for the establishment of Projects on a Pan-India or State-specific basis. The selection process for successful bidders is conducted through a tariff-based competitive e-bidding procedure.

SECI invited bids to set up 2000MW inter-state grid-connected solar power projects. SECI will be paid US$265 million under this tender.

Though SECI was not meant to make profits, it made profits of ₹12 crores in 2014–15, following which the Union Cabinet under the chairmanship of Prime Minister Narendra Modi gave its approval to SECI to:

1. Converting it into Section 3 Company under the Companies Act, 2013

The major impact of the decision will be:

1. SECI will become a self-sustaining and self-generating organisation with its own solar power plants that will generate and sell power. It will also help the company in other segments of solar sector activities, including the manufacturing of solar products and materials, since it was not allowed earlier.
2. SECI will become RECI after a change of its name and then will take up development of all segments of renewable energy, namely, geothermal, offshore wind, tidal, etc., apart from solar energy.
3. In 2016, SECI also faced huge challenges. Since India's reverse auction mechanism has not stabilized the market and system in 2016, SECI has conducted 9 auctions. However, most of the projects were unable to proceed normally, and many bids were under-subscribed.

== See also ==
- Solar power in India
- Central Electronics Limited (CEL)
- Tata Power Solar
- Solairedirect
