= Sakri solar plant =

Building in India

Sakri Solar Plant
- Country: India
- Location: Shivajinagar, Sakri taluka, Dhule, Maharashtra
- Coordinates: 20°59′N 74°19′E
- Status: Operational
- Commission date: March 2013
- Construction cost: Rs 20 billion
- Owner: Mahagenco

Solar farm
- Type: Flat-panel PV
- Site area: 400 acres (160 ha)

Power generation
- Nameplate capacity: 125.0 MW

Sakri Photovoltaic solar energy project is a 125 MW solar photovoltaic power plant. The project was developed by Mahagenco in Shivajinagar in Sakri taluka of Dhule district in Maharashtra, India. Its cost was about Rs 20 billion, and it became operational in 2013. Completion was in March 2013.

KfW, a German financial institution, has agreed to finance the project. Work has already started on 125 MW (5x25MW) Solar Photovoltaic part while for remaining 100 MW part, based on crystalline technology, international bids have been invited.
