= Dhirubhai Ambani Solar Park =

Photovoltaic power stations in India

- Country: India
- Location: Pokhran
- Coordinates: 26°45′47″N 72°00′51″E
- Status: Operational
- Commission date: 31 March 2012; 14 years ago
- Owner: Reliance Power

Solar farm
- Type: Concentrated solar power

Power generation
- Units operational: 500,000
- Nameplate capacity: 40 MW_{AC} planned: 300 MW
- Annual net output: 60 gigawatt-hours (216 terajoules)

The Dhirubhai Ambani Solar Park at Dhursar village near Pokhran in the Jaisalmer district of Rajasthan is a 40 megawatt (MW_{AC}) photovoltaic power station, set up in 129 days and commissioned in 2012. It is one of a large number of solar parks expected to be built in a 35,000 km^{2} area of the Thar Desert that has been reserved for solar power projects. The solar park was named after the late Dhirubhai Ambani, the founder of Reliance Industries, and was constructed using 500,000 Cadmium telluride photovoltaics (CdTe) modules by First Solar, and covers an area of 350 acres (140 hectares).

India has a target of developing 22,000 megawatts (7.5×10^{10} British thermal units per hour) of solar power plants, and an additional 8,000 megawatts (2.7×10^{10} British thermal units per hour) is expected in local generation, bringing the total to 30,000 megawatts (1.0×10^{11} British thermal units per hour) by 2022. Speaking at the dedication of the park, the new and renewable energy minister hoped that Rajasthan alone would exceed 22,000 MW by then.

A 100 megawatts (340,000,000 British thermal units per hour) solar thermal project at the same location has been synchronised in November, 2014.
