= National Solar Mission =

Initiative of the Government of India

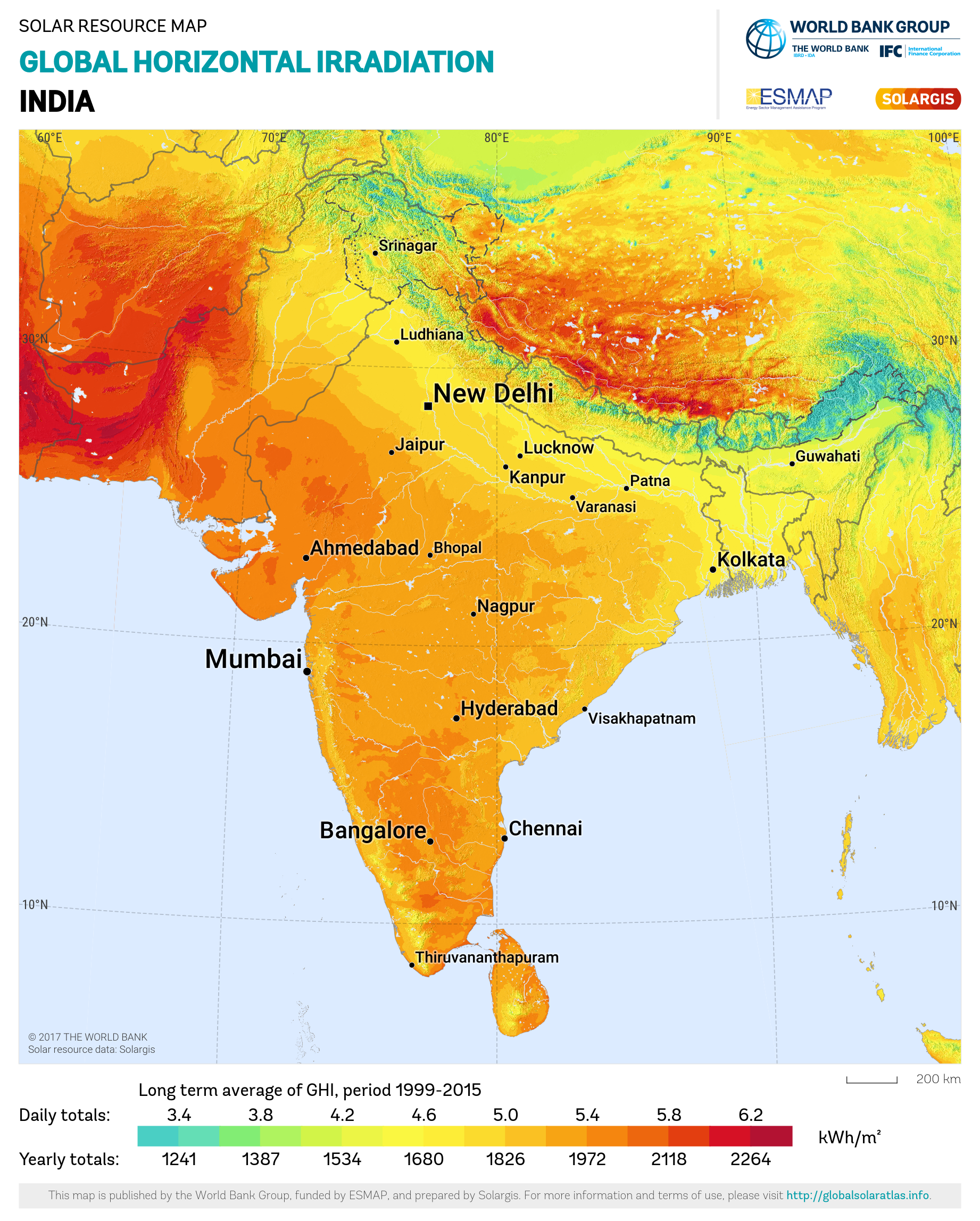
Global Horizontal Irradiance in India. The potential solar power in the country has been assessed to be around 748 GWp.

The National Solar Mission (NSM) is a major initiative of the Government of India with active participation from States, to meet its growing energy demands while addressing climate change.

The NSM was launched as the Jawaharlal Nehru National Solar Mission by Ministry of New and Renewable Energy on January 11, 2010 under National Action Plan on Climate Change with the objective to establish India as a global leader in solar energy by creating the policy conditions for solar technology diffusion across the country as quickly as possible.

To achieve this goal, the mission targets were:

- To create an enabling policy framework to reduce the cost of solar power generation enabling large scale deployment
- To create favourable conditions for solar manufacturing capability through aggressive R&D and the domestic production of critical raw materials, components and products.

NSM adopted 3 phase approach
Phases	Timelines	Capacity Targets
Phase 1	2010-13	1100 MW
Phase 2	2013-17	10 GW
Phase 3	2017-22	100 GW

Initially, the phase 3 target was 20 GW capacity by 2022. It was later revised to 100 GW. Timelines for which was later extended to March 2026.

== Achievements ==
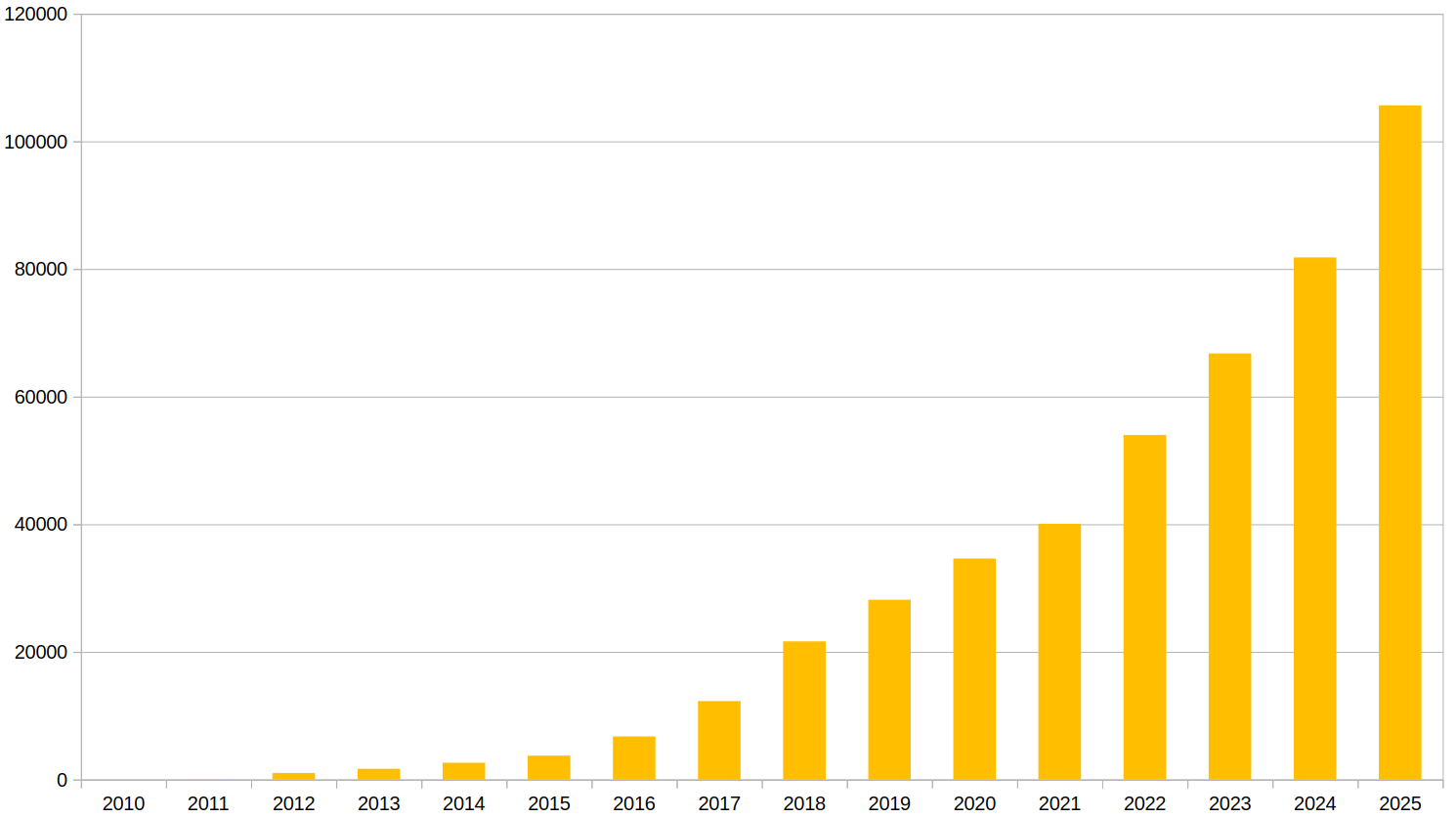
India's Cumulative Solar Capacity

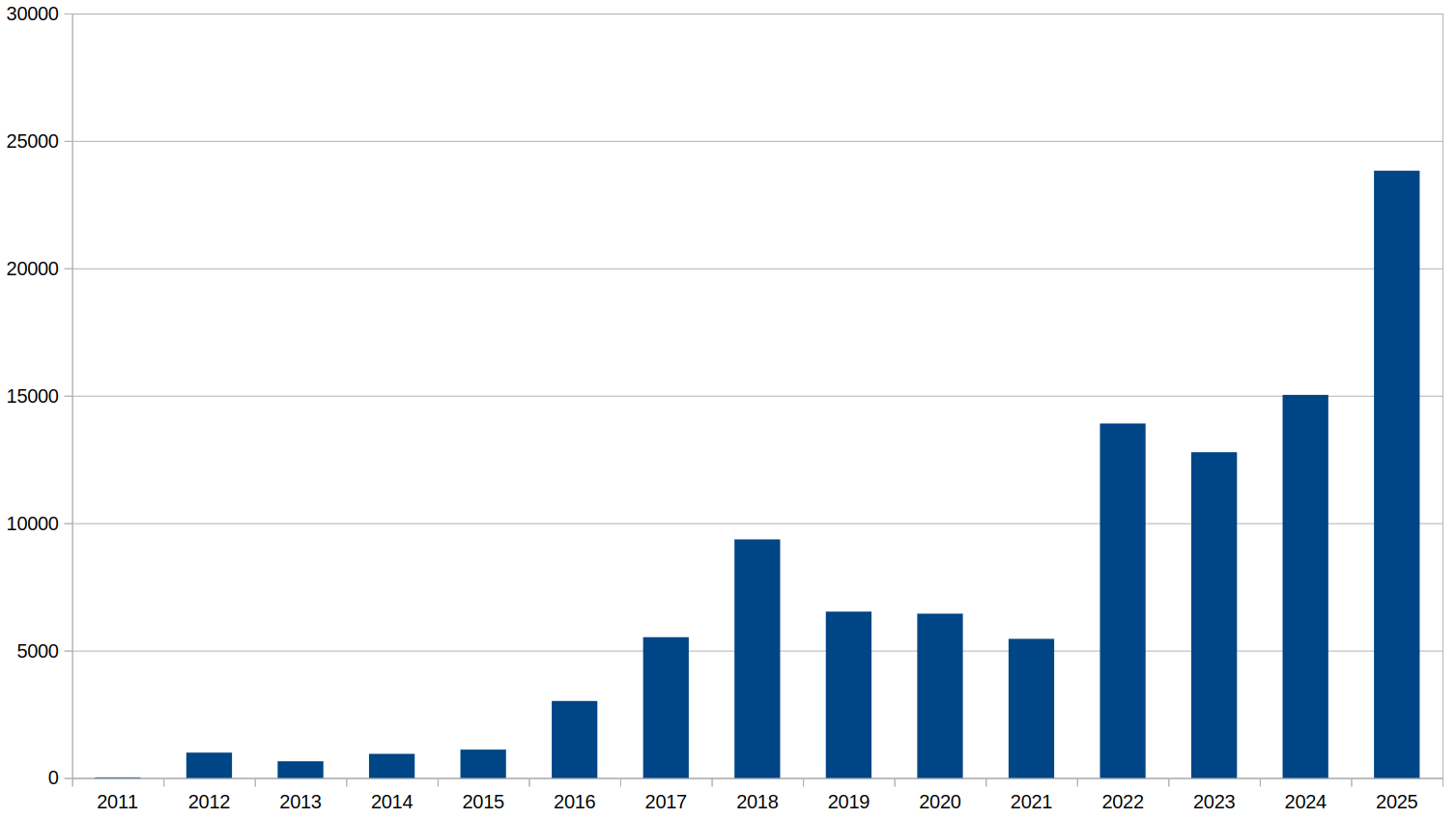
India's Solar Capacity Additions

India reached the 100 GW milestone on Jan 31 2025.

Installed Solar Capacity as on Mar 31 of listed year
Year	Cumulative Capacity (MW)	Capacity Added in FY (MW)
2010	11	
2011	36	25
2012	1030	994
2013	1686	656
2014	2631.93	945.9
2015	3743.97	1112.04
2016	6762.85	3018.88
2017	12288.83	5525.98
2018	21651.48	9362.65
2019	28180.71	6529.23
2020	34627.82	6447.11
2021	40085.37	5457.55
2022	53996.54	13911.17
2023	66780.34	12783.8
2024	81813.6	15033.26
2025	105646.49	23832.89

== Phase 1 (2010–13) ==
At the time, many investors were willing to set up solar power plants in India, but sale of power by the IPPs was an issue due to the high cost of power and realization of tariff for the same from the distribution companies.

It was decided to bundle solar power along with power out of the cheaper unallocated quota of Central stations and selling this bundled power to state distribution utilities at the CERC regulated price. This brought down the gap between average cost of power and sale price of power.

For the purpose of bundling, power was to be purchased by an entity and re-sold to the state power distribution utilities. Such function can be done only by a trading company/Discoms, as per the existing statutory provisions.

NTPC had a wholly owned subsidiary company engaged in the business of trading of Power – NTPC Vidyut Vyapar Nigam Ltd. (NVVN). NVVN was designated as nodal agency for entering into a PPA with Solar Power Developers.

The first phase of NSM aimed to commission 1100 MW of grid-connected solar power projects by 2013. This included:

- 500 MW of solar thermal
- 500 MW of solar PV
- 100 MW of rooftop and small solar plants
- 200 MW of off-grid solar applications
- 7 million sq. meters of solar thermal collector area (for SWHs, solar cooking, solar cooling, Industrial process heat applications, etc.)

NVVN laid out Guidelines for selection of developers for commissioning grid connected solar power projects in India. It issued Request for Selection document outlining criteria for selection: Solar Thermal RFS, Solar PV RfS. To avoid allocating entire capacity to a select few corporate, guidelines required no two projects to have the same parent company or common shareholders. In case of over subscription, a reverse bidding process was to be used to select the final IPPs based on lowest tariff they offer.

Phase 1 Implementation
Stages	Policy	Scope	Avg Tariff
Migration Scheme	On-going projects under advanced stage of implementation in different States were provided an option to migrate from their existing arrangements to JNNSM, subject to the consent of distribution licensee, state government and willingness of the developer.	PV- 54 MW	Rs. 17.91
Migration Scheme	On-going projects under advanced stage of implementation in different States were provided an option to migrate from their existing arrangements to JNNSM, subject to the consent of distribution licensee, state government and willingness of the developer.	Thermal- 30 MW	Rs. 15.31
Batch 1	Modules based on crystalline silicon must be manufactured in India.	PV- 150 MW	Rs. 12.12
Batch 1	Modules based on crystalline silicon must be manufactured in India.	Thermal- 470 MW	Rs. 11.48
Batch 2	Projects had to use cells and modules manufactured in India. Modules made from thin film technologies or concentrator PV cells may be sourced from any country, provided the technical qualification criterion is fully met.	PV- 350 MW	Rs. 8.77

NVVN would sign PPAs with the developers and sell the purchased power to different state utilities which had to fulfill their mandatory Renewable Purchase Obligation.

Key Government Measures:

- Concessional Import duty, excise duty exemption, accelerated depreciation and tax holiday.
- Generation Based Incentive and facility for bundled power for Grid connected Solar Power Projects through various interventions announced from time to time.
- Awareness programmes such as exhibitions, training workshops etc. were conducted.
- Provision for renewable purchase obligation for solar was made in the National Tariff Policy.
- A payment security mechanism was created to ensure payment to project developers.

== Phase 2 (2013-17) ==
After having built an initial momentum of solar projects in the country through setting up domestic manufacturing, demand and fiscal incentives during Phase 1, the next phase was focused on supporting projects through Viability Gap Funding (VGF).

The cumulative capacity targets for March 2017 were:

- 10 GW of grid-connected solar PV plants
- 1 GW of Off-grid solar applications
- 15 million sqm of Solar Thermal Collector Area

Phase 2 Implementation
Stages	Schemes Involved	Scope	Maximum VGF
Batch 1	VGF Scheme: Implemented by SECI in close association with NVVN. Projects were selected through open competitive reverse bidding on VGF sought by bidders. SECI would purchase at a levelized tariff of Rs 5.45 / unit and would sell to willing buyers at Rs 5.5 / unit for 25 years	375 MW with DCR	30% of the project cost upto Rs 2.5 Cr / MW
Batch 1	VGF Scheme: Implemented by SECI in close association with NVVN. Projects were selected through open competitive reverse bidding on VGF sought by bidders. SECI would purchase at a levelized tariff of Rs 5.45 / unit and would sell to willing buyers at Rs 5.5 / unit for 25 years	375 MW with no DCR restriction	30% of the project cost upto Rs 2.5 Cr / MW
Batch 2	(Tranche-I of 15 GW project) Bundling Scheme: Implemented by NVVN. 3 GW Solar power would be bundled in ratio of 2:1 with 1.5 GW unallocated coal based thermal power	3 GW	
Batch 3	State Specific VGF Scheme: Implemented by SECI. Projects were selected through reverse bidding on VGF sought by bidders. SECI would purchase at levelized tariff of Rs 5.79 / unit and would sell to willing buyers at Rs 5.5 / unit for 25 years.	DCR category: 250 MW	DCR category: 1.31 Cr/MW
Batch 3	State Specific VGF Scheme: Implemented by SECI. Projects were selected through reverse bidding on VGF sought by bidders. SECI would purchase at levelized tariff of Rs 5.79 / unit and would sell to willing buyers at Rs 5.5 / unit for 25 years.	Open category: 1750 MW	Open category: Rs.1Cr/MW
Batch 4	State Specific VGF Scheme: Implemented by SECI. Projects were selected through reverse bidding on VGF sought by bidders. SECI would purchase at levelized tariff of Rs 4-4.5 / unit and would sell to willing buyers at Rs 5 (or less) / unit for 25 years.	5 GW	DCR category: Rs. 1.25 Cr/MW
Batch 4	State Specific VGF Scheme: Implemented by SECI. Projects were selected through reverse bidding on VGF sought by bidders. SECI would purchase at levelized tariff of Rs 4-4.5 / unit and would sell to willing buyers at Rs 5 (or less) / unit for 25 years.	5 GW	Open category: Rs. 1 Cr/MW
Batch 5	Scheme for CPSU with VGF: Implemented by SECI. Scheme for setting up PV projects on government buildings with VGF support.	1 GW	Projects using domestic cells and modules: Rs. 1 Cr/ MW
Batch 5	Scheme for CPSU with VGF: Implemented by SECI. Scheme for setting up PV projects on government buildings with VGF support.	1 GW	Projects using domestic modules: Rs. 50 Lakh / MW

== Phase 3 (2017-25) ==
The 100 GW cumulative capacity target was further broken down into following categories. Original timeline of March 2022 was later extended to March 2026, but were achieved by Jan 2025.

Categories	Target (GW)
Rooftop Solar	40
Scheme for Decentralized Generation of Solar Energy Projects by Unemployed youths, Village Panchayats, Small Scale Industries (SSI) Units	10
Public Sector Undertakings	10
Large Private Sector	5
SECI	5
Under State Policies	20
Ongoing programmes	10

== 2025 and Beyond ==
As per the target announced by India in the COP26, 500 GW of non fossil based capacity is proposed to be achieved by 2030. The Optimal Generation Mix 2030 Report of CEA estimates a cumulative capacity of around 292 GW for solar PV by 2029-30.

This is planned to be achieved through various schemes such as:

- Pradhan Mantri Surya Ghar - Muft Bijli Yojana
- Pradhan Mantri - Kisan Urja Suraksha evam Utthaan Mahaabhiyan (PM-KUSUM)
- Scheme for Development of Solar Parks and Ultra-Mega Solar Power Projects
- CPSU Scheme for Grid Connected Solar PV Power Projects, etc.

Other government measures included: Concessional Import duty, Excise duty exemption, Tax holidays, Viability Gap Funding, Generation Based Incentive, Renewable Purchase Obligation, Green Energy Corridor, Permitting FDI up to 100% under the automatic route, etc

== Domestic Content complaint ==
Guidelines for the solar mission mandated cells and modules for solar PV projects based on crystalline silicon to be manufactured in India. That accounts to over 60% of total system costs. For solar thermal, guidelines mandated 30% project to have domestic content. A vigorous controversy emerged between power project developers and solar PV equipment manufacturers. The former camp prefers to source modules by accessing highly competitive global market to attain flexible pricing, better quality, predictable delivery and use of latest technologies. The latter camp prefers a controlled/planned environment to force developers to purchase modules from a small, albeit growing, group of module manufacturers in India. Manufacturers want to avoid competition with global players and are lobbying the government to incentivise growth of local industry.

Market responded to domestic content requirement by choosing to procure thin film modules from well established international players. A significant number of announced project completions are using modules from outside India.

US Trade Representative has filed a complaint at World Trade Organization challenging India's domestic content requirements in Phase II of this Mission, citing discrimination against US exports and that industry in US which has invested hugely will be at loss. US insists that such restrictions are prohibited by WTO. India however claims that it is only an attempt to grow local potential and to ensure self sustenance and reduce dependence

== See also ==
- Solar power in India
- Electricity sector in India
- Solar Energy Corporation of India
- Renewable energy in India
- Paramount Solar Park
