= Sasan Ultra Mega Power Project =

4th largest power station in India

Sasan Ultra Mega Power Plant (Sasan UMPP)
- Country: India
- Location: Sasan village, Singrauli district, Madhya Pradesh
- Coordinates: 23°57′56″N 82°37′30″E
- Status: Active
- Commission date: 19 March 2015 (all 6 units)
- Construction cost: ₹25,186 crores
- Owner: Reliance Power Limited
- Operator: Sasan Power Limited

Thermal power station
- Primary fuel: Coal

Power generation
- Units operational: 6 × 660 MW
- Make and model: Shanghai Electric
- Nameplate capacity: 3,960 MW

External links
- Website: https://www.reliancepower.co.in

Sasan Ultra Mega Power Plant or Sasan UMPP is one of the four Ultra Mega Power Projects awarded by the Ministry of Power, Government of India. It is located in Sasan village near Waidhan in Singrauli district of Madhya Pradesh. Sasan UMPP is India's largest integrated power generation and coal mine project with 3,960 MW power plant and 20 MT per year coal mining capacity. It is presently the 4th largest electricity generation power plant in India after NTPC Vindhyachal (4,760 MW), Mundra Thermal Power (4,620 MW) and Mundra UMPP (4,000 MW). The total project value of Sasan UMPP is ₹25,186 crores (₹251.86 Billion).

The plant is estimated to have been one of the ten most carbon polluting coal-fired power plants in the world in 2018, at 27.2 million tons of carbon dioxide, and relative emissions are estimated at 1.4 kg per kWh.

== History ==
The plant is operated by Sasan Power Limited (SPL), a subsidiary of Reliance Power Limited. SPL was incorporated on 10 February 2006. The Letter of Intent (LoI) was awarded to Reliance Power on 01 August 2007 and the Power purchase agreement (PPA) was signed on 07 August 2007. As of March 2020, it provides electricity to 13 million customers across 7 states of India. The Engineering, procurement and construction (EPC) contract was given to Reliance Infrastructure. In terms of Plant Load Factor among all thermal power plants in India, Sasan achieved “Numero Uno” position in the country for 4th year in a row.

== Coal Mines ==
The Sasan UMPP is a pit-head power project, which has been allocated 3 captive coal mine blocks: Moher, Moher-Amlohri extension and Chhatrasal in Singrauli, Madhya Pradesh. Reserves are in excess of 750 million tonnes. Together, the mines produce 20 million tonnes of coal each year, making it the largest integrated power plant and coal mines project in India.

== Installed capacity ==
Following is the unit-wise capacity of the 3,960 MW plant. There are 6 units of 660 MW each.

Stage	Unit Number	Installed Capacity (MW)	Date of Commissioning	Status
Stage I	1	660	16 Aug 2013	Running
Stage I	2	660	28 Jan 2014	Running
Stage I	3	660	12 Apr 2014	Running
Stage I	4	660	27 May 2014	Running
Stage I	5	660	12 Dec 2014	Running
Stage I	6	660	19 Mar 2015	Running

== Achievements ==
- The plant achieved the highest Plant Load Factor (PLF) of 90.84% in 2015-16 in the first year of its full operation.
- The Plant achieved 94.78% PLF in 2018-19, the highest among thermal power plants in India.
- The Plant achieved 95.85% PLF in 2019-20, the highest among thermal power plants in India.
- The Plant achieved 96.25% PLF in 2020-21, the highest among thermal power plants in India.
- The Plant achieved 94.78% PLF in 2021-22, the highest among thermal power plants in India.

== Status updates ==
- Aug 2007: Reliance Power awarded the contract for this project.
- Mar 2015: All 6 units of Sasan UMPP became operational.

== See also ==
- Reliance Infrastructure
- Vindhyachal Thermal Power Station
