= Ultra Mega Solar Power Projects =

Solar power plants in India

Ultra Mega Solar Power Projects, also known as Ultra Mega Solar Parks, are a series of solar power projects planned by the Ministry of New and Renewable Energy of the Union Government of India to expand renewable energy and address energy and environmental challenges. Each power project has a minimum capacity of 500 MW.

In December 2014, the Government of India introduced a scheme to establish at least 25 solar parks and Ultra Mega Solar Power Projects, adding over 20 GW of installed solar power capacity. The Central Government provides financial support for the construction of these solar projects through the Ministry of New and Renewable Energy. In February 2017, the Union Cabinet increased the total number of planned solar parks to 50 with a total capacity of 40 GW. By April 2017, 34 solar parks were under construction across 21 states.

As of January 31, 2025, solar parks of aggregate capacity of 41,137 MW have been proposed for development. The capacity for 13,054 MW is already commissioned, 15,181 MW is in construction, and 12,902 MW is in the awarding process to firms. India has successfully produced 197.19 GW of capacity of renewable energy.

== List of projects ==
List of Ultra Mega Solar Power Projects
Project name	Location	State	Capacity (MW)	
Project name	Location	State	Operational	Planned
NP Kunta Ultra Mega Solar Park	Anantapur	Andhra Pradesh	978.5	1500
Kadapa Ultra Mega Solar Park	Galiveedu	Andhra Pradesh	250	1000
Kurnool Ultra Mega Solar Park	Kurnool	Andhra Pradesh	1000	1000
Ananathapurumu II Solar park	Tadipatri	Andhra Pradesh	500	500
Pavagada Solar Park	Tumakuru	Karnataka	2000	2000
Rajnandgaon Solar Park	Rajnandgaon	Chhattisgarh	100	100
Rewa Ultra Mega Solar	Rewa	Madhya Pradesh		500
Neemuch - Mandsaur Solar park	Neemuch	Madhya Pradesh		500
Agar - Shajapur Solar Park	Shajapur	Madhya Pradesh	550	550
Paramount Solar Park - K.P.Power	Beed	Maharashtra		500
Bhadla Solar Park	Phalodi	Rajasthan	2245	2255
Kamuthi Solar Power Project	Kamuthi	Tamil Nadu	648	648
Gujarat Hybrid Renewable Energy Park	Kutch	Gujarat		3000
Dholera Solar Park	Dholera SIR	Gujarat		5000
Gujarat Solar Park-1	Patan	Gujarat	615	615
Radhanesda (Banaskantha) Solar Park	Radhanesda	Gujarat	700	700
Odisha Solar Park	Landehill, Ganjam	Odisha		40
Total			9,586.5	20,408

== Motivations ==
India has expanded its renewable energy capacity to address issues arising from air and water pollution due to industrial activity and inadequate sanitation. As a result, India established Ultra Mega Solar Projects (UMPP) as large-scale solar industrial parks.

India is the world’s fourth-largest consumer of electricity and third-largest producer of electricity, and it has an installed capacity of 356 GW. However, it still has one of the lowest per capita consumption of electricity, with over 300 million Indian people lacking access to it. With the Ultra Mega Solar Power projects, India aims to push its electricity capacity to 5000 GW.

Some of the largest UMPPs include Dholera, Bhadla, Pavagada, and Kurnool Solar Parks, which help supply electricity and make energy more accessible in all areas in India. In addition to efficiency, proponents of the parks advocate for the use of low-cost, reliable and low-emission systems based on renewable energy. For instance, greenhouse gas emissions per year are expected to decrease by over a million tons once the Rewa project is completed.

== Funding ==
Funding for each project is split among state governments, administrative agencies, Central Public Sector Undertakings (see Public Sector Undertakings in India), and private entrepreneurs. The Ministry of New and Renewable Energy and the Solar Energy Corporation of India review proposals submitted by potential developers. A selected developer is designated as a Solar Power Park Developer (SPPD).

The Ministry of New and Renewable Energy has designated Central Financial Assistance (CFA) of up to either Rs. 20.00 lakh per MW or 30% of the project cost. It also provides CFA of up to Rs. 25 lakh per solar park for preparing a Detailed Project Report.

The Climate Investment Fund (CIF) has also invested in India’s solar power projects, including Bhadla Solar Park, which received $200 million directly from the CIF and $112 million in additional co-financing facilitated by the fund.

== Challenges ==
Solar parks are land-intensive, requiring, on average, five acres per megawatt generated. This demand for land has increased competition within the private sector for companies to win investment bids for India’s solar parks. Critics of the solar parks are concerned that locals displaced by the parks’ construction are not being fairly compensated for their land and livelihoods.

Researchers also warn against environmental harms that come from water stress on the arid environments selected for construction. Large solar plants are washed twice a year, which requires 70,000 to 20,000 liters of water per megawatt per wash. Locals have advocated for areas of biodiversity, such as Oran, to be protected from solar plant construction.

== Impacts ==
Private investments have made the solar projects a large market for private equity and venture capital. From 2018 to 2019, there was a 169% increase in investment amounting to $1.4 billion USD. India is projected to invest $360 billion USD by 2030 in renewable energy projects, which includes solar projects.

Due to its geography, India receives on average 4 to 6 kW per meter per day of solar radiation around 300 days per year. This has encouraged more private companies to invest in solar power installations and domestic manufacturing, including panel cell and wafer production. India has been projected to become the second-largest solar panel manufacturer in the world by 2025.

These projects have also contributed to a growing solar and wind industry workforce. In 2014, the solar and wind workforce had 19,800 workers, and this number grew to 100,000 workers in 2019. An individual solar park, such as the Sun Source Energy Solar Open Access Project in Bundelkhand, employs 500 workers. As a region, the Bundelkhand solar projects employ around 2440 workers in total. In the Poorvanchal region, 5000 new employment opportunities have been created by solar park construction.

== See also ==
- Solar power in India
- List of photovoltaic power stations
