= Tata Power Dholera Solar PV Station =

Photovoltaic power station in Gujarat, India

- Country: India
- Location: Dholera, Gujarat
- Coordinates: 22.148434°N 72.236085°E
- Construction began: March 2020
- Commission date: April 2022
- Operator: Tata Power Renewable Energy Limited

Solar farm
- Type: Flat-panel PV
- Site area: 1320 acres

Power generation
- Nameplate capacity: 400 MW

Tata Power Dholera Solar PV Station is a photovoltaic power station located within the Dholera Solar Park. It is owned and operated by Tata Power Renewable Energy Limited, a wholly owned subsidiary of Tata Power.

== History ==
The 300 MW Phase 1 of the plant went online in April 2022. At that time, it was the largest single-axis solar tracker system.

During construction, unpredictable weather, including heavy rains, flooded the 33 KV cable trench. Despite this, the EPC team used floaters to install high-tension cables and elevated pre-cast ballasts to position power cables 500 mm above ground, bypassing the conventional underground approach.

Currently, the plant is providing electricity to Gujarat Urja Vikas Nigam under a 25-year power purchase agreement.
