= Ahmedabad Airport =

Airport serving Ahmedabad, Gujarat, India

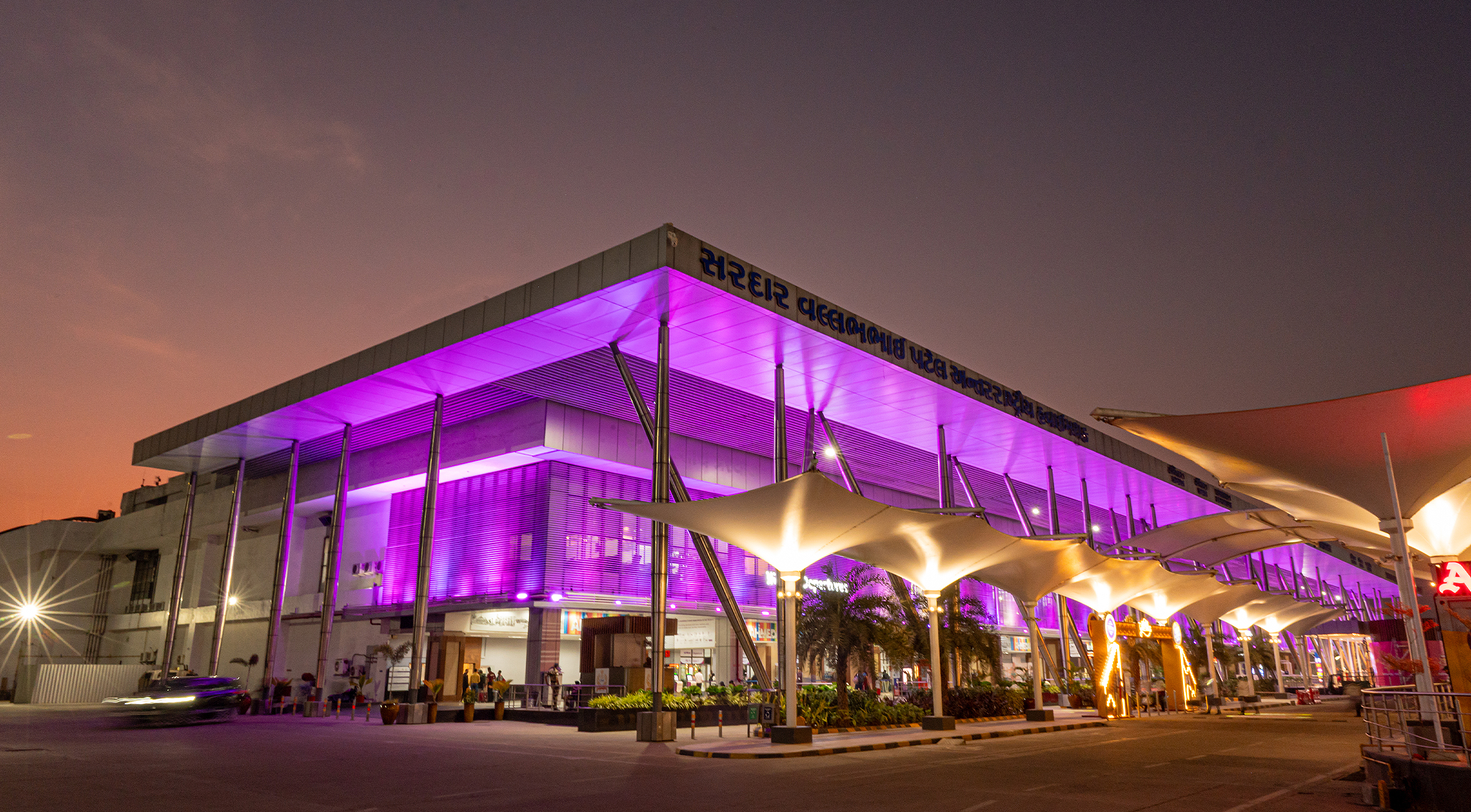
- IATA: AMD; ICAO: VAAH

Summary
- Airport type: Public
- Owner: Airports Authority of India
- Operator: Ahmedabad International Airport Limited
- Serves: Ahmedabad; Gandhinagar
- Location: Hansol, Ahmedabad, Gujarat, India
- Opened: 1937; 89 years ago
- Focus city for: Air India
- Operating base for: IndiGo
- Elevation AMSL: 189 ft (58 m)
- Coordinates: 23°04′38″N 072°38′05″E
- Website: svpia-ahmedabad.adaniairports.com

Maps
- Location within Ahmedabad Location within Gujarat Location within India
- Interactive map of Ahmedabad Airport

Runways
Direction	Length		Surface
Direction	m	ft	Surface
05/23	3,505	11,499	Asphalt

Statistics (April 2025 - March 2026)
- Passengers: 13,822,287 (▲2.9%)
- Aircraft movements: 103,475 (▲2.3%)
- Cargo tonnage: 135,648 (▲14.1% )
- Source: AAI

Ahmedabad Airport, officially Sardar Vallabhbhai Patel International Airport (IATA: AMD, ICAO: VAAH), is an international airport in Ahmedabad, Gujarat, India. It is named after Sardar Vallabhbhai Patel, the first Deputy Prime Minister of India. The airport is the busiest and largest airport in the state of Gujarat, and is the seventh-busiest airport in India.

In fiscal year 2024–25, it handled over 13 million passengers, making it the seventh-busiest airport in terms of passenger traffic in India. The airport serves as a focus city for Air India and an operating base for IndiGo. In 2015, the government started the procedure for the privatisation of the airport. The new Dholera International Airport is being developed due to expansion constraints at the current airport.

== History ==
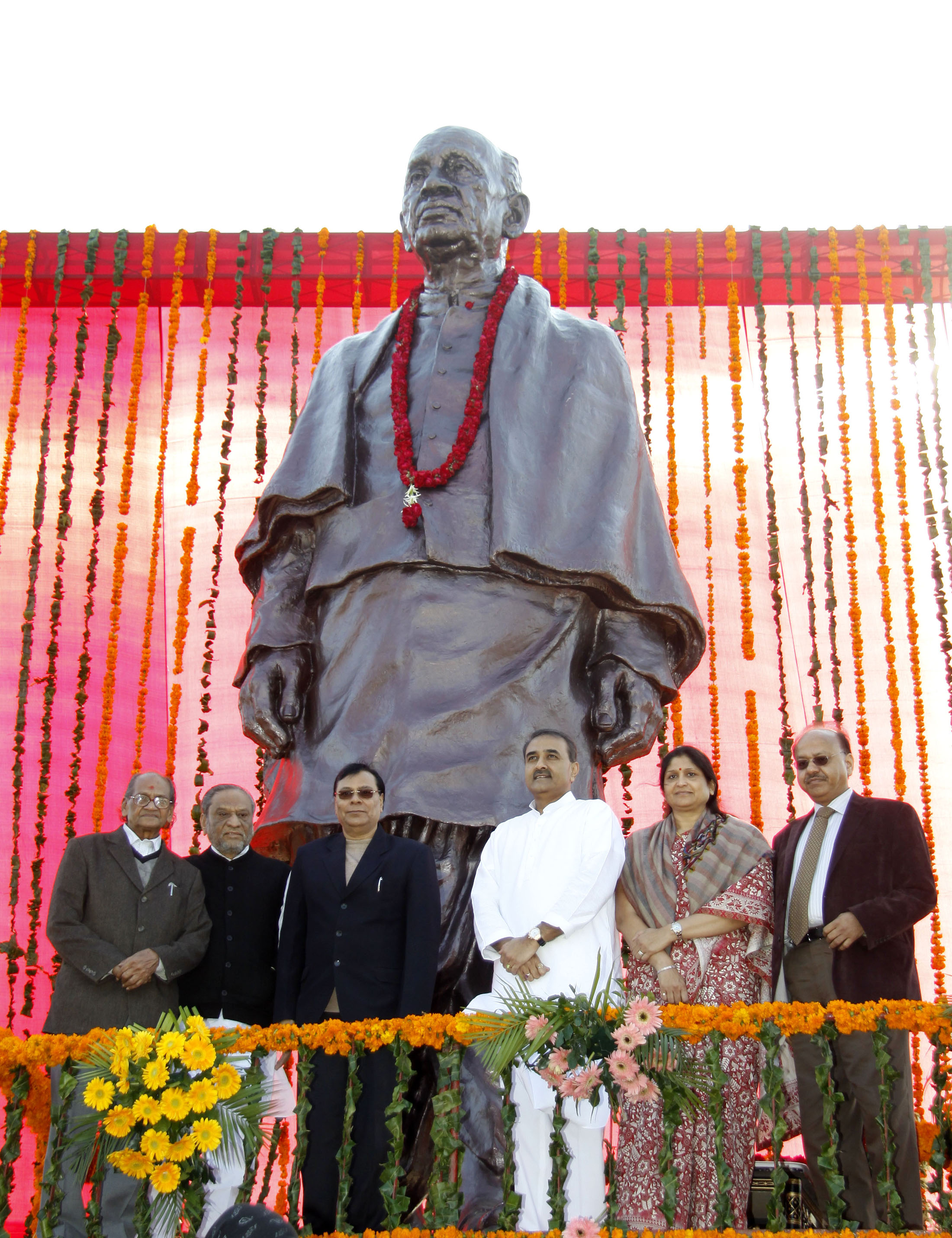
Statue of Sardar Patel, installed within the airport in 2011

The airport opened in 1937, while international operations began on 26 January 1991. It was categorised as an international airport on 23 May 2000. In March 2004, Air India commenced service to London's Heathrow Airport with a Boeing 747. The flight catered to the large Gujarati community in the United Kingdom. The carrier ended the service in October 2008. The following June, Air India began a route to Frankfurt using 747s. The link lasted until November 2010.

The new Terminal 2 was inaugurated for handling international passengers in 2010. A 5.5-metre-tall (18 ft) statue of Sardar Vallabhbhai Patel was also inaugurated at the airport. In August 2016, Air India reinstated direct service to London-Heathrow aboard a Boeing 787. Of the four weekly flights, three continued on to Newark. In March 2017, a 700 kWp rooftop solar plant was commissioned at the airport. Air India stopped operating the London–Newark service in November 2018.

In November 2018, the Central Government cleared a proposal by the Airports Authority of India (AAI) for leasing out six of its airports, including Ahmedabad. The following month, AAI commenced an international competitive bidding process to award Operations, Management and Development (OMD) contracts for the six airports. Seven companies participated in the bidding process for Ahmedabad airport. These included Adani Enterprises Limited, Sydney, Australia-based AMP Capital Investors (UK) Limited, Autostrade, GMR Airports Limited, I Investments Ltd, PNC Infrastructure Ltd and Sanna Enterprises.

The bidding process that was won by the Adani Group. Subsequent to the selection of Adani Enterprises Limited (AEL) as the selected bidder, AEL promoted and incorporated the Special Purpose Vehicle (SPV) – Ahmedabad International Airport Limited (AIAL), as the concessionaire under the Companies Act, 2013 in accordance with the terms of the RFP. AIAL signed the Concession Agreement with AAI for exclusive right to operate, manage and develop Ahmedabad Airport on 14 February 2020.

== Structure ==
The airport currently consists of four terminals: domestic, international, an additional terminal for secondary traffic and a cargo terminal. The airport has 45 aircraft parking bays and both the international and domestic terminals have four aero-bridges each. The new terminal was modelled on Singapore Changi Airport.

The new terminal has a 500 metre-long moving walkway, which connects the two terminals. Airports Authority of India (AAI) will construct a new technical block which will enhance the flight handling capacity and provide better control of flights.

=== Runway ===
The airport's single runway, 05/23, is 3,505 metres (11,499 ft) long, with runway 23 being used for over 70% of operations. It has a single parallel taxiway which only extends 1,895 metres (6,217 ft) along its full length. As a result, aircraft requiring a full-length departure from 23 must backtrack along the runway, while those arriving on 05 and rolling past the taxiway must turn around and backtrack to exit. Larger wide-body aircraft cannot use the taxiway at all. As this significantly limits the peak number of flights the airport can safely handle, there are plans to extend the taxiway to the full length of the runway, with the first 395 metres (1,296 ft) extension completed in March 2024.

=== Air traffic control tower ===
As part of the airport modernisation process, the AAI announced that it would construct a new air traffic control (ATC) building that would include a new airport tower 65 metres (213 ft) in height.

== Terminals ==
=== Terminal 1 ===
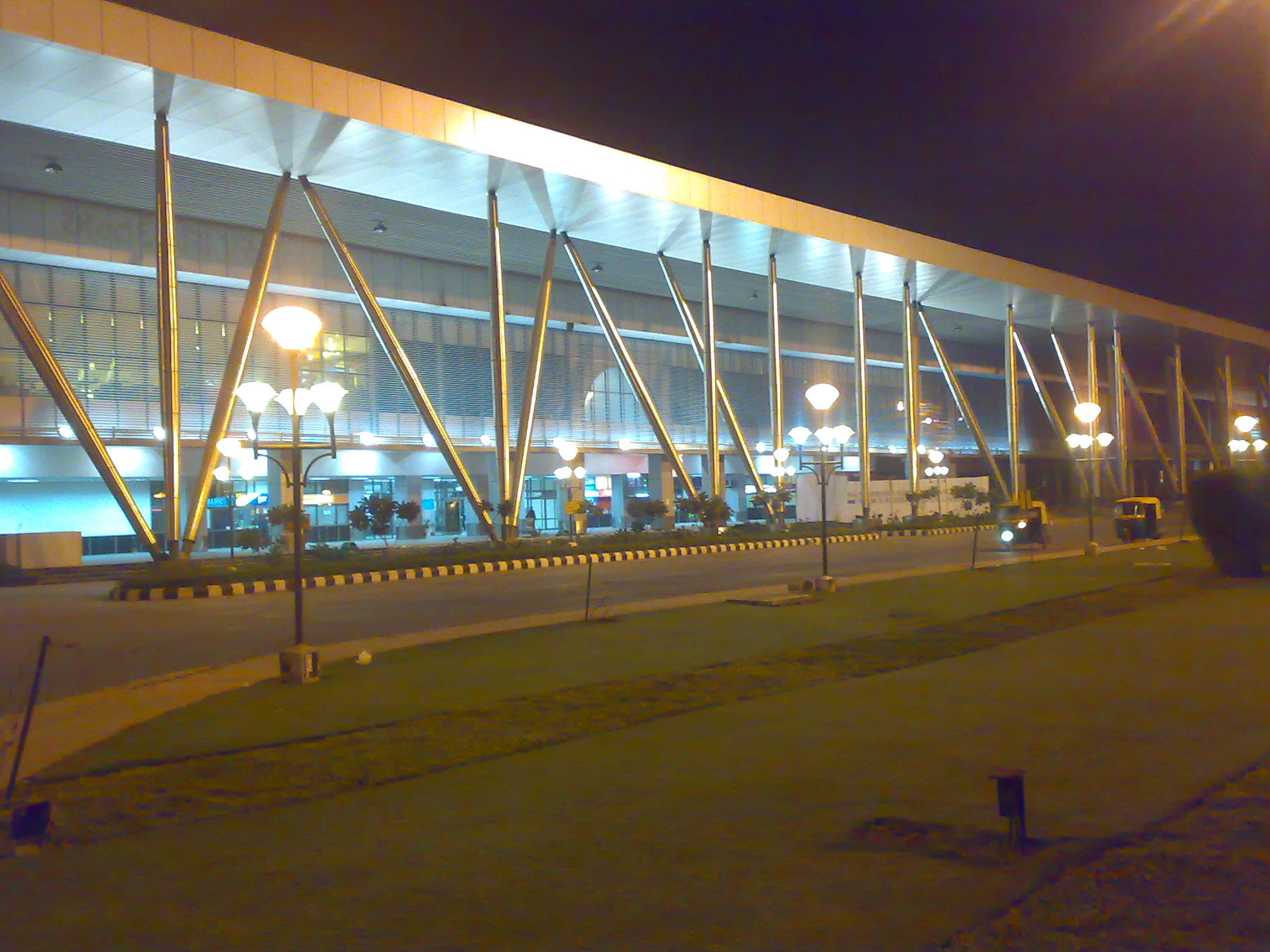
Exterior of Terminal 1

Terminal 1 is used for domestic flights. It has 32 check-in counters and has an area of 45,000 m^{2} (480,000 sq ft).

=== Terminal 2 ===
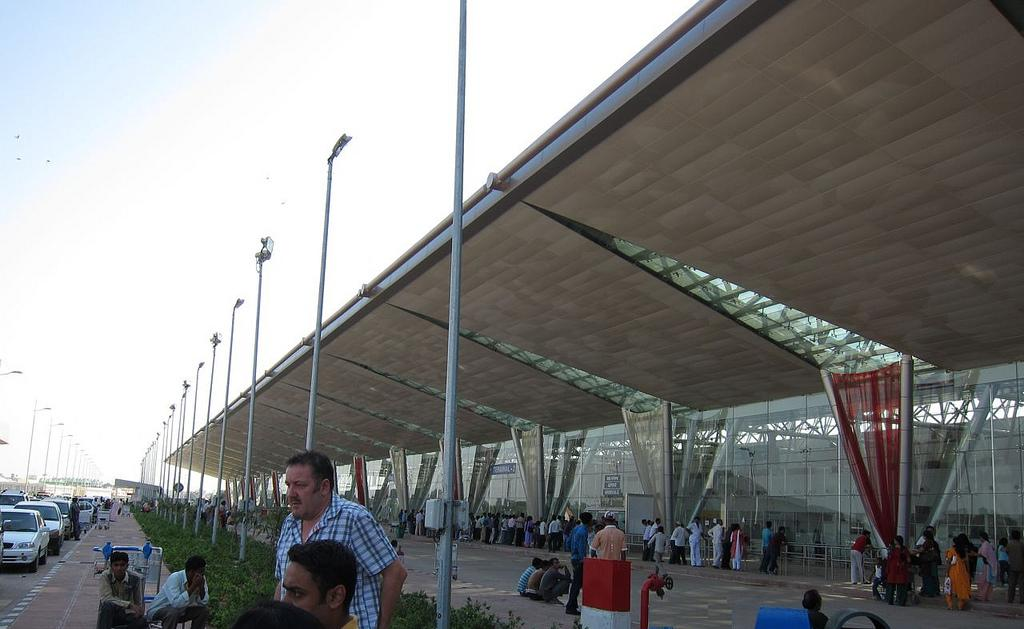
Exterior of Terminal 2

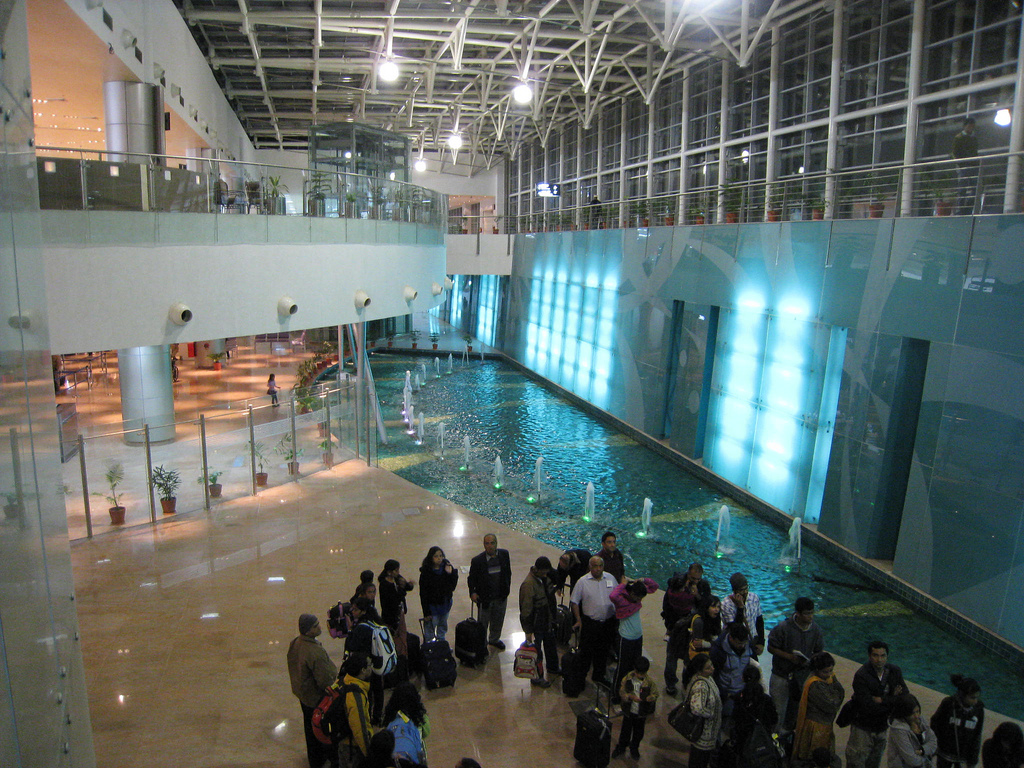
Interior of Terminal 2

Terminal 2 was inaugurated on 5 July 2010 and opened for international flights on 15 September 2010. The terminal won the award for the best Steel Structure at the 2009 edition of the National Structural Steel Design and Construction Awards. The terminal has four aerobridges and 32 check-in counters. With a total floor area of approximately 41,000 sq. metres, this terminal will be able to accommodate around 1,600 passengers at any given time. In November 2018, a new Plaza Premium lounge was opened at the international departures area of Terminal 2, which caters for business class and first class passengers as well as passengers holding Priority Pass.

=== Cargo terminal ===
The airport handled 51,637 tonnes of cargo in 2013–14. Sixty per cent of the cargo came from domestic sources. In 2009, 3,685 square metres (39,670 sq ft) of land was leased for a period of seven years out by the AAI to Gujarat Agro Industries Corporation to set up a center for perishable cargo. However, due to a government policy that prevented third-party operations at airports run by the AAI, the CPC was not in use until July 2014, when the minister of state for civil aviation announced that the government had issued a No Objection Certificate for commencement of operations. In 2014, it was announced that the airport would be getting a dedicated cargo terminal which is expected to come up at Terminal 3.

== Airlines and destinations ==
=== Passenger ===
Airlines	Destinations
Air Arabia	Abu Dhabi, Sharjah
Air India Express	Bengaluru, Chandigarh, Dehradun, Delhi, Mumbai–Shivaji
AirAsia	Kuala Lumpur–International
Akasa Air	Abu Dhabi, Jeddah, Kolkata
Alliance Air	Daman, Keshod
Emirates	Dubai–International
Etihad Airways	Abu Dhabi
FitsAir	Colombo–Bandaranaike
Flydubai	Dubai–International
IndiGo	Abu Dhabi, Ayodhya, Dehradun, Diu, Goa–Mopa, Guwahati, Jaisalmer, Jeddah, Jodhpur, Mumbai–Navi, Nashik, Patna,Thiruvananthapuram
Iran Air	Mashhad
Jazeera Airways	Kuwait City
Kuwait Airways	Kuwait City
Malaysia Airlines	Kuala Lumpur–International
Qatar Airways	Doha
Singapore Airlines	Singapore
SpiceJet	Jaipur, Patna, Sharjah; Charter: Najaf
Star Air	Jamnagar, Kolhapur, Mumbai–Navi, Mundra, Nagpur, Nanded, Purnea
Sun PhuQuoc Airways	Phu Quoc (begins 2 December 2026)
Thai AirAsia	Bangkok–Don Mueang
Thai Airways International	Bangkok–Suvarnabhumi
Thai Lion Air	Bangkok–Don Mueang
Thai VietJet Air	Bangkok–Suvarnabhumi
VietJet Air	Hanoi, Ho Chi Minh City
Vietnam Airlines	Hanoi (begins 3 November 2026)

=== Cargo ===
Airlines	Destinations	Refs.
Blue Dart Aviation	Delhi, Mumbai	
Qatar Airways Cargo	Doha	

== Future ==
Due to growing demands and rise in passenger traffic, the airport will get a third passenger terminal beside Terminal 1, by moving the present cargo terminal to Terminal 2, which will increase the airport's capacity. Also, the existing parallel taxiway is being extended to match the length of the runway to increase aircraft handling capacity. After that, the airport could not be expanded due to limited space. To solve this problem, a new airport at Dholera, which is being developed into a new smart city, located 107 km (66 mi) south-west from the present airport, is under construction, which will be the biggest airport in Gujarat with two parallel runways. Developed in three phases, the first phase of the airport will be completed by December 2025.

== Awards ==
The airport was awarded as the Most Improved Airport in the Asia-Pacific Region by the Airports Council International in 2017. In 2019, it received three awards for the Best Airport for Customer Service, Best Airport for Environment and Ambience and Best Airport for Infrastructure and Facilitation from the Airport Service Quality (ASQ) Survey for 2019 conducted by Airports Council International.

== Accidents and incidents ==
- Indian Airlines Flight 113, operating from Mumbai to Ahmedabad, crashed on final approach to the airport on 19 October 1988; 133 people died, including all 6 crew members. The flight was cleared for a visual approach into a foggy airport, when it struck trees and a high-tension pylon 5 km (3.1 mi) from Runway 23, crashing into a field and bursting into flames.
- Jet Airways Flight 2510, operating from Indore to Ahmedabad, collapsed on the runway while landing at the airport on 22 July 2010. There were 57 passengers and 4 crew members on board the ATR flight. The nose wheel reportedly collapsed due to a tyre burst, causing some passengers to receive minor injuries.
- Air India Flight 171, a Boeing 787-8 Dreamliner operating from Ahmedabad to London Gatwick, crashed shortly after takeoff in the suburb of Meghaninagar on 12 June 2025. Of the 242 passengers and crew on board, 241 died and one passenger survived the crash, while 19 people died on the ground. This was the first fatal accident and hull loss of a 787, which entered service in 2011.

== See also ==
- Airports in India
- List of busiest airports in India by passenger traffic
