= Bunyu =

Coordinates: 3°30′N 117°50′E

- Interactive map of Bunyu

Geography
- Location: Celebes Sea
- Total islands: 1

Administration
- Indonesia
- North Kalimantan

Bunyu is an oil-rich Indonesian island situated to the north of Tarakan City, in the eastern Celebes Sea off the north-eastern coast of Borneo in North Kalimantan province. The administrative area comprising Bunyu District is composed of eleven islands - Pulau Baru, Pulau Batok, Pulau Bunyu, Pulau Burung, Pulau Papa, Pulau Tibi Barat, Pulau Tibi Lumot, Pulau Tibi Selatan, Pulau Tibi Timur, Pulau Tibi Utara and Pulau Titus - all sharing the postal code of 77281. It lies just off the northern side of the delta of the Sesayap River, with the southern side of the delta having Tarakan Island, and the north Mandul Island.

Bunyu is of economic importance as a producer of petroleum, and coal. The Mundra Thermal Power Station in Gujarat, India uses coal imported from a mine in Bunyu Island, under a 15-year fuel supply agreement signed with Adani Enterprises/Adani Power.

== Traffic ==
- Bunyu Airport
