= BYQ =

BYQ may refer to:

- the IATA code for Bunyu Airport, Indonesia
- the ISO 639-3 code for Basay language
