= DXML =

Digos; Philippines
- Broadcast area: Davao
- Frequency: 1044 kHz
- Branding: DXML

Programming
- Format: News, Talk, Music

Ownership
- Owner: Rural Electrification Corporation

History
- First air date: 1965
- Former frequencies: 1030 kHz (1965–1978)

Technical information
- Power: 10,000 watts

DXML (1044 AM) is a radio station of Rural Electrification Corporation. The station's studio and transmitter are located along MacArthur Hi-way, Digos. In 1981, 6 years after Davao del Sur Electric Cooperative acquired Rural Electrification Corporation, the Associated Labor Unions (ALU) took over the management of the station.
