= Buxar Thermal Power Plant =

Power plant

Buxar Thermal Power Plnt
- Country: India
- Location: Buxar, Bihar
- Coordinates: 25°27′44″N 83°52′57″E
- Status: Under construction
- Construction began: 2019
- Construction cost: INR 10,500 Crores
- Owner: SJVN Thermal Private ltd
- Operator: SJVN

Thermal power station
- Primary fuel: Coal

Power generation
- Nameplate capacity: 1320 MW upcoming

Buxar Thermal Power Plant is a coal-based thermal power plant located at Chausa village in Buxar district, Bihar, India. It was conceptualized in 2013 when SJVN signed an MoU with Bihar State Power Holding Company Limited (BSPHCL) and Bihar Infrastructure Company (BPIC). Prime Minister Narendra Modi laid the foundation stone for this project in March 2019. Larsen & Toubro Limited holds the contract for the construction, at an estimated cost of Rs 7,000 crores. It is scheduled to start power generation in March 2025.

== Capacity ==
The planned capacity of the power plant will be 1320 MW (2x660 MW).

Stage	Unit Number	Capacity (MW)	Date of Commissioning	Status
1st	1	660	November-2025	Operational
1st	2	660	September-2026	Operational

== See also ==
- Electricity sector in India
- Ultra Mega Power Projects
- Bihar State Power Holding Company Limited
