= Sambhar Ultra Mega Solar Power Project =

Sambhar Ultra Mega Solar Power Project is a proposed photo-voltaic solar power project with a cumulative capacity of 4,000 MW at Sambhar in Rajasthan state of India.

Sambhar is home to many species of birds. The proposed project was opposed by several environmental groups. The Union Government later decided to develop the acquired land in Sambhar as a tourist spot, and shift the proposed solar power station to Kharaghoda in Surendranagar district of Gujarat.

== See also ==
- Ultra Mega Solar Power Projects
