= Fedara =

- village
- Location in Gujarat, India Fedara (India)
- Coordinates: 22.454°N 72.161°E
- Country: India
- State: Gujarat
- District: Ahmedabad

Languages
  - Official: Gujarati, Hindi
- Time zone: UTC+5:30 (IST)
- Vehicle registration: GJ-
- Website: gujaratindia.com

Fedara is a small village near Dholera in Ahmedabad district in Indian state of Gujarat.

Gujarat government has proposed a new International Airport for Ahmedabad city. The proposed international airport has been strategically located near the planned 335 million USD Port-cum-SEZ project of the Adani Group spread over 30,000 hectares at Dholera.
