= Dholera Special Investment Region =

Dholera Special Investment Region DSIR
- Suburb
- Location in Gujarat, India Dholera Special Investment Region (India)
- Coordinates: 22.213099°N 72.218230°E
- Country: India
- State: Gujarat
- City: Dholera
- Established: 22 November 1998; 27 years ago

Government
  - Key People: S. S. Rathore (Chairman); Kuldeep Arya (Managing Director)

Area
  - Total: 920 km^{2} (360 sq mi)
- Time zone: UTC+5:30 (IST)
- Postal code: 382455
- Website: dholera.gujarat.gov.in

Dholera Special Investment Region (Dholera SIR) is a greenfield industrial planned city near Dholera in Gujarat's Ahmedabad district, around 100 kilometers to the south-west. spread over more than 920 km^{2}, it is a new industrial city being jointly developed by the Government of India and Gujarat. Dholera is strategically located, well connected with trade gateways and falls in the influence zone of proposed Delhi – Mumbai Industrial Corridor project (DMIC), a joint initiative by the Government of India and Japan.

A legal framework known as the Special Investment Region Act 2009 was made by the Government of Gujarat. A regional development authority for DSIR has been constituted in accordance with the act. The Dholera Special Investment Region Development Authority (DSIRDA) would be in charge of managing government land within DSIR in addition to planning and developing DSIR. The Central Government (NICDC Trust) and the State Government (DSIRDA) of Gujarat have formed an SPV called Dholera Industrial City Development Limited (DICDL) to carry out the project. A special purpose business called the National Industrial Corridor Development Corporation Limited (NICDC) was founded in order to create, support, and facilitate the development of the DMIC Project.

== History ==
In 2009, the project was announced by Narendra Modi when he was the Chief Minister of Gujarat.

In 2009, a regional development authority 'Dholera Special Investment Region Development Authority (DSIRDA)' has been established under Special Investment Region Act 2009, India. DSIRDA is responsible for planning and development of DSIR and maintain the function of administering government land.

Design and Planning Counsel Private Limited (DPC), Ahmedabad was appointed for preparation of Development Plan for Dholera Special Investment Region Development Authority (DSIRDA) through a tendering process. The initial concept plan prepared by Halcrow, DPC was critically evaluated and developed further through satellite image and site verification, base map preparation, matching existing land use maps and cadastral maps. Preparation of Detail land-use and road network plan, development control regulations, and preparing the design of trunk infrastructure. Along with this, DPC was involved in bringing all stakeholders on a common platform by having a number of consultations with Government departments and the public.

Future DPC was also involved in preparation of Town Planning Scheme No.5, which spreads across an area of approx. 75 km2 and Town Planning Scheme No.6 spreads across an area of approx. 67 km2. Both of these are among the 6 town planning schemes proposed to implement the Development Plan of Dholera SIR. T.P. Scheme No.5 covers approximately 853 plots and spans over 5 villages and T.P. Scheme No.6 covers approximately 612 plots and spans over 5 villages. The sprawl around the gamtal is reserved under the green buffer zone. There has been an effort to create large plot appropriations for the authority so as to enable it to raise resources to provide public infrastructure in the area to support industrial development.

== DICDL ==
On 28 January 2016, the governments of India and Gujarat established a Special Purpose Vehicle (SPV) called "Dholera Industrial City Development Ltd." (DICDL) for the development of the Dholera SIR. The Gujarat government owns 51% of the SPV through DSIRDA, and the Indian government owns 49% through DMIC Trust.

The DMIC Trust initially issued cash to DICDL in exchange for equity contributions for activities in the Activation Area. Through DSIRDA, the Gujarat government is contributing equity in the form of land that is given to SPV DICDL. The infrastructure project for the activation trunk has already received approval from the National Industrial Development & Implementation Trust (NICDIT).

== Projects ==
- Ultra-Mega Solar Park of 4400 MW capacity: Out of the 4400 MW, Phase-1 of 1000 MW is under implementation; 300 MW of work has already been commissioned by Tata Power.
- The 109.019 km Ahmedabad–Dholera Greenfield Expressway connects Ahmedabad with Dholera SIR and have opened for public use in 2026 following completion of the principal construction works.
- Bhimnath – Dholera Freight Rail Network, a proposed railway line from Bhimnath to Dholera.
- Dholera International Airport, is a greenfield airport project that is under construction, with commissioning/operations targeted for 2026.
- In 2023, South Korean firms visited Dholera SIR to explore business opportunities, indicating growing international interest in the region.
- The region is also ready to kickstart its plug-and-play infrastructure, aimed at attracting both national and international investments.
- Vedanta Group is in talks with three partners for setting up a semiconductor and display fab in Dholera SIR, with a proposed $5 billion investment for the first phase.
- The government has allocated a 12,095 square meter plot for the first 5-star hotel in the region, with the e-auction for the plot scheduled for 8 June 2023.
- Tata to Set Up India's First Chip Fab Unit In Gujarat's Dholera.
- In July 2026, the Gujarat government's Data Centre Policy 2026-29 named Dholera as its primary hub, with officials citing potential capacity of 7 to 8 gigawatts and investment of ₹6–7 lakh crore.

== Controversies ==
- Between 2009 and 2022, farmers from about 22 villages in Gujarat's Bhal region staged protests against the Gujarat SIR Act, 2009's land pooling for the DSIR, which includes projects like the Ahmedabad–Dholera Expressway and the airport. They opposed the 2013 Land Acquisition Act's requirement for consent, the plan to take 50% of their land and return smaller or flood-prone plots, the loss of productive farmland, and compensation based on antiquated jantri rates. Rallies, sit-ins, threats of hunger strikes, arrests, and the creation of organizations like Bhal Bachao Samiti were all part of the protests, but the government persisted in surveying land and sending out notices in spite of the opposition.

== See also ==
- Dholera
- Dholera Airport
- Dholera Solar Park
