= Shri Swaminarayan Mandir, Dholera =

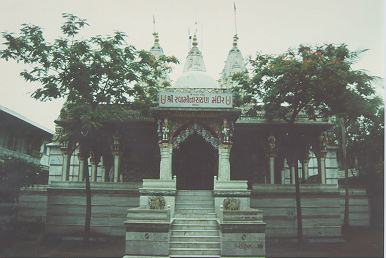
- The temple at Dholera

Religion
- Affiliation: Hinduism
- Deity: Radha Krishna
- Festivals: Janmashtami, Radhashtami, Holi

Location
- Location: Dholera
- State: Gujarat
- Country: India

Architecture
- Creator: Swaminarayan
- Completed: May 19, 1826

Shri Swaminarayan Mandir, Dholera is a Hindu temple in Dholera, Gujarat, India, and is one of nine Shri Swaminarayan Temples built by Swaminarayan.

== About the Mandir ==
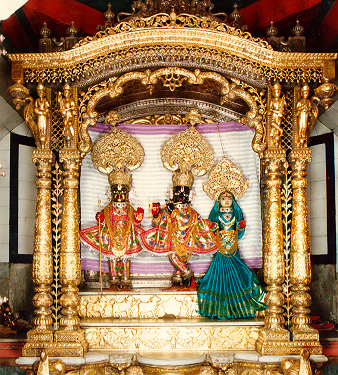
Central Altar of the temple Madan Mohan dev (Krishna at center), Radha ji (Right) and HariKrishna Maharaj (Left).

Dholera itself is an ancient port-city, 30 km from Dhandhuka of Ahmedabad district.

The making this temple with three spires was supervised and planned by Nishkulanand Swami, Atmanand Swami, Akshardanand Swami and Dharmprasad Swami.

The land on which the building is sited was donated by Darbar Punjabhai. Swaminarayan Bhagwan, when camping in Kamiala, was requested by the devotees Shri Punjabhai and others, to go to Dholera to install idols in the new temple in Dholera. Swaminarayan bhagwan asked Brahmin priests to find out an auspicious time for the installation ceremony.

Swaminarayan bhagwan graced Dholera on the request from Punjabhai and other devotees, and on May 19, 1826, and installed the idols of Madan Mohan dev and his own form, Harikrishna Maharaj, at the principal seat of the temple amidst Vedic hymns. Swaminarayan bhagwan then appointed Adbhutanand Swami as the temple's mahant.

The central altar is graced with the idols of deities Madan Mohan Dev (Krishna), Radha ji and HariKrishna Maharaj. Besides the deities in the inner temple and Garbhagriha, Hanuman and Ganapati grace Roop Chowki near the main stairway of the temple. On the west, near the steps, there are the idols of Sheshashayi, Suryanarayan, Dharm-Bhakti and Ghanshyam Maharaj. The idols of Shankar and Parvati are on the right hand side.
