= Lanco Amarkantak Power Plant =

Lanco Amarkantak Power Plant is a coal based thermal power project located at Pathadi village in Korba district in Indian state of Chhattisgarh. The power plant owned and operated by Lanco Infratech.

In 2024, Adani Power acquired Lanco Amarkantak.

== Capacity ==
Its planned capacity is 1920 MW (2x300 MW, 2x660 MW).

Unit Number	Capacity (MW)	Date of Commissioning	Status
1	300	2009	Running.
2	300	2010	Running.
3	660		Under construction.
4	660		Under construction.
