= Kawai Thermal Power Station =

Coordinates: 24.7776°N 76.7364°E

Kawai Thermal Power Station is a coal-based thermal power plant located in Kawai village in Baran district, Rajasthan. The power plant is operated by the Adani Power.

== Capacity ==
This is located at NH 90 Kawai Atru main road district Baran. Kawai, Rajasthan 1320 MW (2 X 660 MW)

Kawai has a total installed capacity of 1320 MW and has the capability to expand in future. Kawai consists of 2x660 MW units. For immediate connectivity, Kawai has a 1500m long air strip and is using state of the art technology for environment management.

Stage	Unit Number	Installed Capacity (MW)	Date of Commissioning	Status
1	1	660	January 2013	Running
1	2	660	January 2014	Running

Adani Power Limited (APL), executed a MoU with the Government of Rajasthan (GoR) in March 2008, to set up a thermal power generation project of 1200 MW (±10%) and sell at least 50% power in the State of Rajasthan which later on, implemented long term PPA (21.01.2010) thru competitive bidding process for supply of 1200 MW power to Rajasthan Discoms.
