= Mundra Ultra Mega Power Plant =

Building in India

Mundra Ultra Mega Power Project (TATA POWER LIMITED)
- Country: India
- Location: Tunda village in Mundra, Kutch district, Gujarat
- Coordinates: 22°49′20″N 69°31′56″E
- Status: Operational
- Construction began: 2007
- Commission date: 2012-2013
- Owner: Tata Power
- Operator: Coastal Gujarat Power Ltd.

Thermal power station
- Primary fuel: Subbituminous coal

Power generation
- Units operational: 5 × 800 MW
- Make and model: Toshiba, Doosan
- Nameplate capacity: 4,000 MW

Mundra Ultra Mega Power Project or Mundra UMPP is a subbituminous coal-fired power plant in Tunda village at Mundra, Kutch district, Gujarat, India. It is the 3rd largest operational power plant in India. The coal for the power plant is imported primarily from Indonesia. The source of water for the power plant is sea water from Gulf of Kutch. The power plant is owned by Tata Power. The special purpose vehicle Coastal Gujarat Power Ltd (CGPL) was incorporated on 10 February 2006.

== Capacity ==
The capacity of the project is 4,000 MW with 5 units of 800 MW each.

Stage	Unit Number	Installed Capacity (MW)	Date of Commissioning
1st	10	800	March 2012
2nd	20	800	July 2012
3rd	30	800	October 2012
4th	40	800	January 2013
5th	50	800	March 2013
Total	Five	4000	

== Technology ==
The plant uses super-critical boiler technology. Mundra UMPP would use 1.7 million tonnes of less coal per year while generating the same quantum of power. Boilers are supplied by Doosan and turbines are supplied by Toshiba.

== Buyers ==
Tata Power entered into a power purchase agreement for the sale of the 4,000 MW capacity of the plant.

State	Contracted Capacity (MW)
Gujarat	1,805
Maharashtra	760
Punjab	475
Rajasthan	380
Haryana	380
Non-PPA	200
Total	4000

In January 2013, the company terminated the PPA with the Rajasthan distribution companies - Jaipur Vidyut Vitaran Nigam, Jodhpur Vidyut Vitaran Nigam and Ajmer Vidyut Vitaran Nigam - due to non-compliance on payment security related issues and consistent failure on the part of the discoms as procurers to fulfill their obligations, including collateral arrangements. The company will now have to option of selling the power in the merchant market.

== Controversy over power tariff ==
Tata Power won the project through a competitive tariff based bidding route in 2006 by quoting 55% of the fuel cost as a non-scalable component and a levelised tariff of Rs 2.26 per kWh or unit. The Indonesian government's decision in 2010 to change its mining law to bring coal price exported from Indonesia in line with the international market caused an increase in coal price and under-recovery of costs at Mundra UMGPP (and similarly impacted Adani Power's 4620 MW Mundra plant). The loss led to an erosion of Tata Power's net worth by over 3800 crore in 3 years. The company had accordingly petitioned the Central Electricity Regulatory Commission for compensatory tariff hike, and later for compensatory relief.

In December 2016 the Central Electricity Regulatory Commission allowed compensatory relief for Tata Power from the electricity procuring states under the Force Majeure clause after having awarded in February 2014 a compensatory tariff of 52 paise per unit; however the orders are subject to the outcome of a pending appeal in the Supreme Court. The compensatory relief also is to be adjusted against profits made in sale of coal from the Indonesian mines where the companies have a stake.

In 2007, Tata Power had acquired a 30% stake in two Indonesian thermal coal companies owned by PT Bumi Resources—PT Kaltim Prima Coal (KPC) and PT Arutmin Indonesia— for about $1.1 billion as part of a strategy to provide low cost coal for the Mundra UMPP.

In 2014, Tata Power agreed to sell a 30% stake it held in PT Arutmin Indonesia, to the Bakrie Group for a sale consideration of $510 million (later revised to $400 million). No date has been set for his sale closure, which is pending regulatory clearances from the authorities

The company had requested Central Electricity Regulatory Commission to allow a tariff hike to about Rs 3.00 per unit

The company had petitioned the CERC to rule whether the company can claim relief under any/all of the following:

- Article 13 of the PPA due to Change in Law

The company stand is that the definition of law under the PPA is an inclusive (and not exhaustive) definition. The definition of law covers 'any law' and is not restricted to Indian law. The term 'law' is required to be interpreted in a contextual basis with a view to give business efficacy to the PPA since the project is based on imported coal and the fuel supply arrangements are a part of the Project Documents. The definition of Law must be given a plenary meaning and cannot be read down by confining it to Indian laws. The promulgation and enforcement of 'Regulation of Ministry of Energy and Mineral Resources No. 17 of 2010 regard procedure for Setting Mineral and Coal Benchmark Selling Price' dated 23.09.2010 by Government of Indonesia ("Indonesian Regulations") led to an unprecedented, uncontrollable and unforeseeable rise in coal prices which constitutes a 'Change in Law' under the PPA.

- Article 12 of the PPA, pertaining to Force Majeure

The definition of Force Majeure under Article 12.3 of the PPA covers "any event or circumstance or combination of events or circumstances that wholly or partly prevents or unavoidably delays an Affected Party in performing its obligations under the PPA to the extent such events or circumstances are not within the reasonable control, directly or indirectly of the Affected Party and could not have been avoided if the Affected Party had taken reasonable care". Tata Power is arguing that the promulgation of the Indonesian Regulation is an event which is beyond its control and has made it impossible for the company to perform its obligations as per the contracted price. So this is covered as a Force Majeure event under Article 12.3 of the PPA.

- CERC's power to 'regulate' tariff by exercising its powers under Section 79(1)(b) of the Electricity Act, 2003.

Tata Power is arguing that CERC has the power under Section 79(1)(b) of the Electricity Act, 2003 to revisit/restructure the tariff for a power project if the project has lost its viability and it has become commercially impossible for the project owner to perform its contractual obligations.

On 18 July 2012 the Central Electricity Regulatory Commission deferred a decision on Tata Power's petition. Central Electricity Regulatory Commission has asked the company to go back and take recourse to the dispute resolution provisions of the power purchase agreement (PPA) before seeking relief from the Central Electricity Regulatory Commission.

On 25 October 2012 the CERC admitted the petition for hearing since the consultative process under Article 17.3 of the Power Purchase Agreement (PPA) between Coastal Gujarat Power Ltd and the lead procurer, Gujarat Urja Vikas Nigam Limited (GUVNL) had failed. The petition will now be renotified for hearing on 4 December 2012.

== See also ==
- Ultra Mega Power Plants (India)
- Mundra Thermal Power Station owned by Adani Power
