= Raikheda Thermal Power Station =

Coordinates: 21.450°N 81.853°E

Raikheda Thermal Power Station is a coal-based thermal power plant located in Raikheda village in Tilda Tehsil in Raipur district in the Indian state of Chhattisgarh.

On 3 August 2019, Adani Power Limited or Adani Group Chhattisgarh took over control of the power plant from GMR Chhattisgarh Energy Ltd.

Project Details

Sponsor: Raipur Energen

Parent company: Adani Group

Location: Raikheda, Gaitra, and Chicoli villages, Tilda tehsil, Raipur district, Chhattisgarh

Coordinates: 21.4499182, 81.8524736 (exact)

Status: Operating

Capacity: 1370 MW (2 x 685 MW) Type:

Projected in service: 2015 (Unit 1); 2016 (Unit 2)

Coal Source: Imported coal from South Africa until domestic coal linkage is obtained[11]

Estimated annual CO_{2}: 8,101,770 tons

Source of financing:

== Capacity ==
It is a 1370 MW (2×685 MW) project.

Unit No.	Generating Capacity	Commissioned on	Status
1	685 MW	2016 February	Running
2	685 MW	2016 March	Running
