= Bhadla Solar Park =

Solar power array in Rajasthan, India

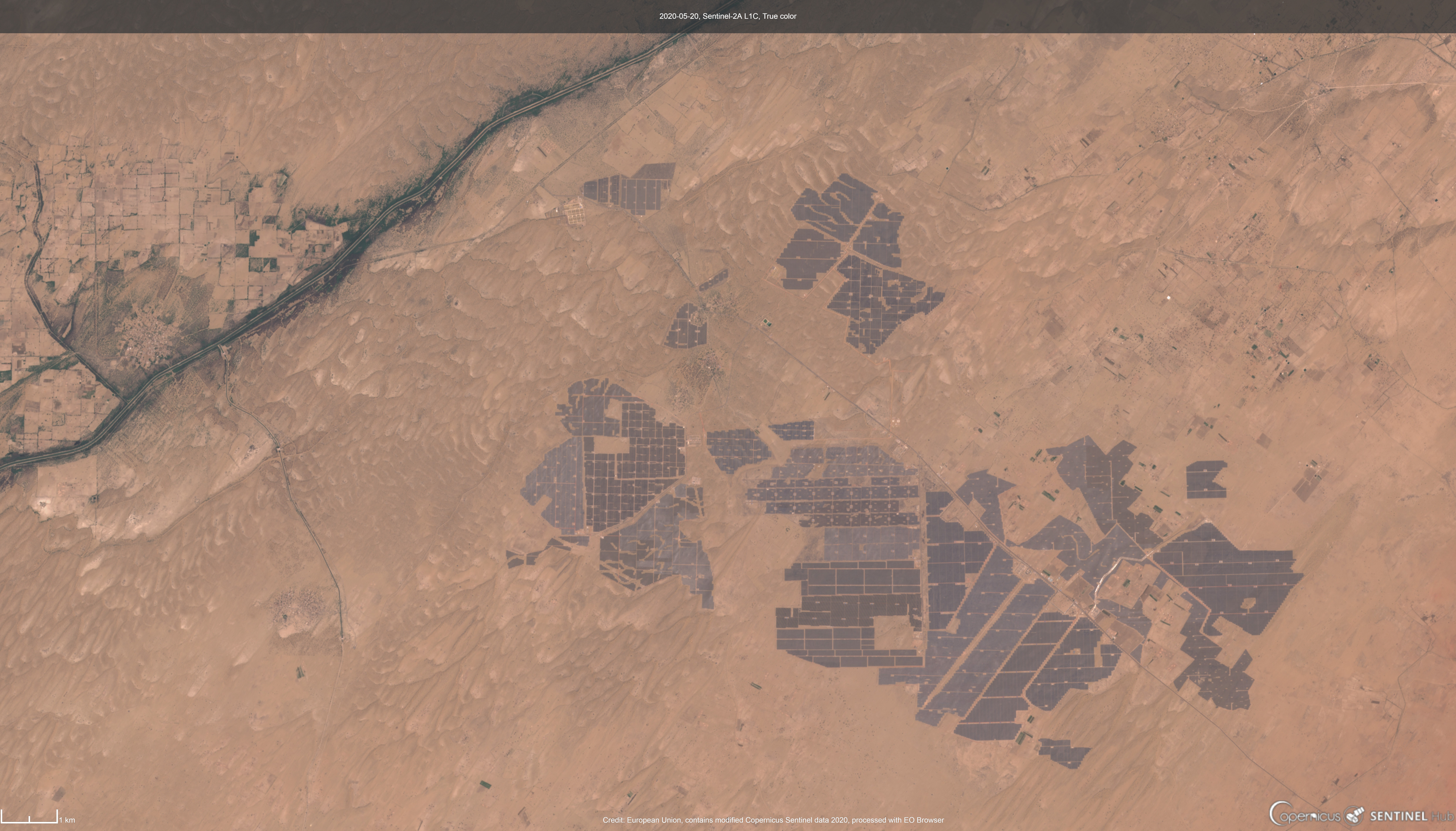
- Country: India
- Location: Bhadla, Phalodi district, Rajasthan
- Coordinates: 27°32′23″N 71°54′55″E
- Status: Operational
- Commission date: 20 March 2020; 6 years ago
- Construction cost: (US$2.175 billion) 200crores

Solar farm
- Type: Flat-panel PV
- Site area: 5,700 ha (14,000 acres)

Power generation
- Nameplate capacity: 2,245 MW

External links
- Website: https://ntpcrel.co.in/
- Commons: Related media on Commons

The Bhadla Solar Park is a solar power plant located in the Thar Desert of Rajasthan, India. It covers an area of 56 square kilometers and has a total installed capacity of 2,245 megawatts (MW), making it India's largest and the 11th-largest solar park in the world as of 2024. The park was developed in four phases since 2015, with $775 million in funding from the Climate Investment Fund and $1.4 billion in funding from other sources. The park contributes to India's renewable energy goals and helps reduce greenhouse gas emissions by an estimated 4 million tons per year.

== Development ==
The Bhadla Solar Park was initiated by the Rajasthan Renewable Energy Corporation Limited (RRECL), a joint venture between the Government of Rajasthan and the Ministry of New and Renewable Energy (MNRE). The RRECL identified Bhadla, a remote area in the Phalodi tehsil of Phalodi district, as a suitable site for solar power generation due to its high solar irradiance, low population density, and availability of government-owned land.

In Phase I in 2017, NTPC Limited auctioned 420 MW to several developers including Fortum of Finland. In Phase II, Solar Energy Corporation of India (SECI) auctioned 250 MW which includes the under-construction AMPIN Energy Transition's Bhadla Solar Power Plant and NTPC Bhadla Solar Power Plant. In Phase III on May 11, 2017, ACME Power won 200 MW and Softbank Group (SBG) won 300 MW. In Phase IV on May 9, 2017, Phelan Energy Group won 50 MW, Avaada Energy won 100 MW and SBG Cleantech consortium won 100 MW. SECI tendered bids for the remaining 750 MW in June 2017. After its completion in December 2018, the solar park achieved a total installed capacity of 2,055 MW, making it the largest solar park in India as of 2023.

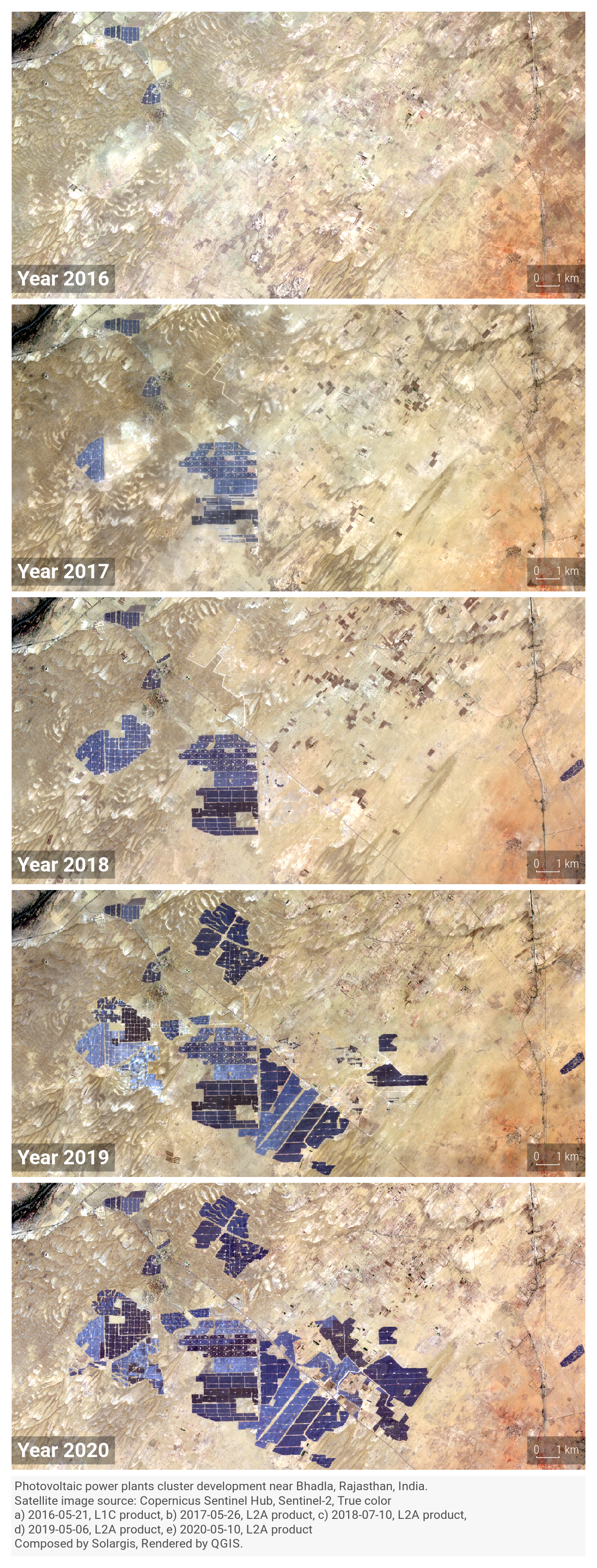
Development of Bhadla Solar Park documented on satellite Sentinel-2 imagery

== Impact ==
The Bhadla Solar Park is one of the projects of India's National Solar Mission, which aims to install 100 gigawatts (GW) of solar power by 2022. The park also helps India meet its commitments under the Paris Agreement to reduce its carbon intensity by 33-35% by 2030.

According to a study by the World Bank, the park has multiple benefits for the local economy and environment. The park has created about 10,000 direct and indirect jobs during construction and operation. The park has also improved the quality and reliability of electricity supply in the region. The park has also reduced the dependence on fossil fuels and avoided about 4 million tons of carbon dioxide emissions per year.

== Challenges ==
The Bhadla Solar Park has faced some challenges due to its location and scale. One of the main challenges has been dust accumulation on the solar panels, which reduces their efficiency and output. The park is also located in an arid region that experiences frequent dust storms and sandstorms. Some operators have adopted automated cleaning robots to reduce manual labour and water consumption.

== See also ==
- Ultra Mega Solar Power Projects
- Solar power in India
