= AMPIN Energy Bhadla Solar Power Plant =

Photovoltaic power station in Bhadla, India

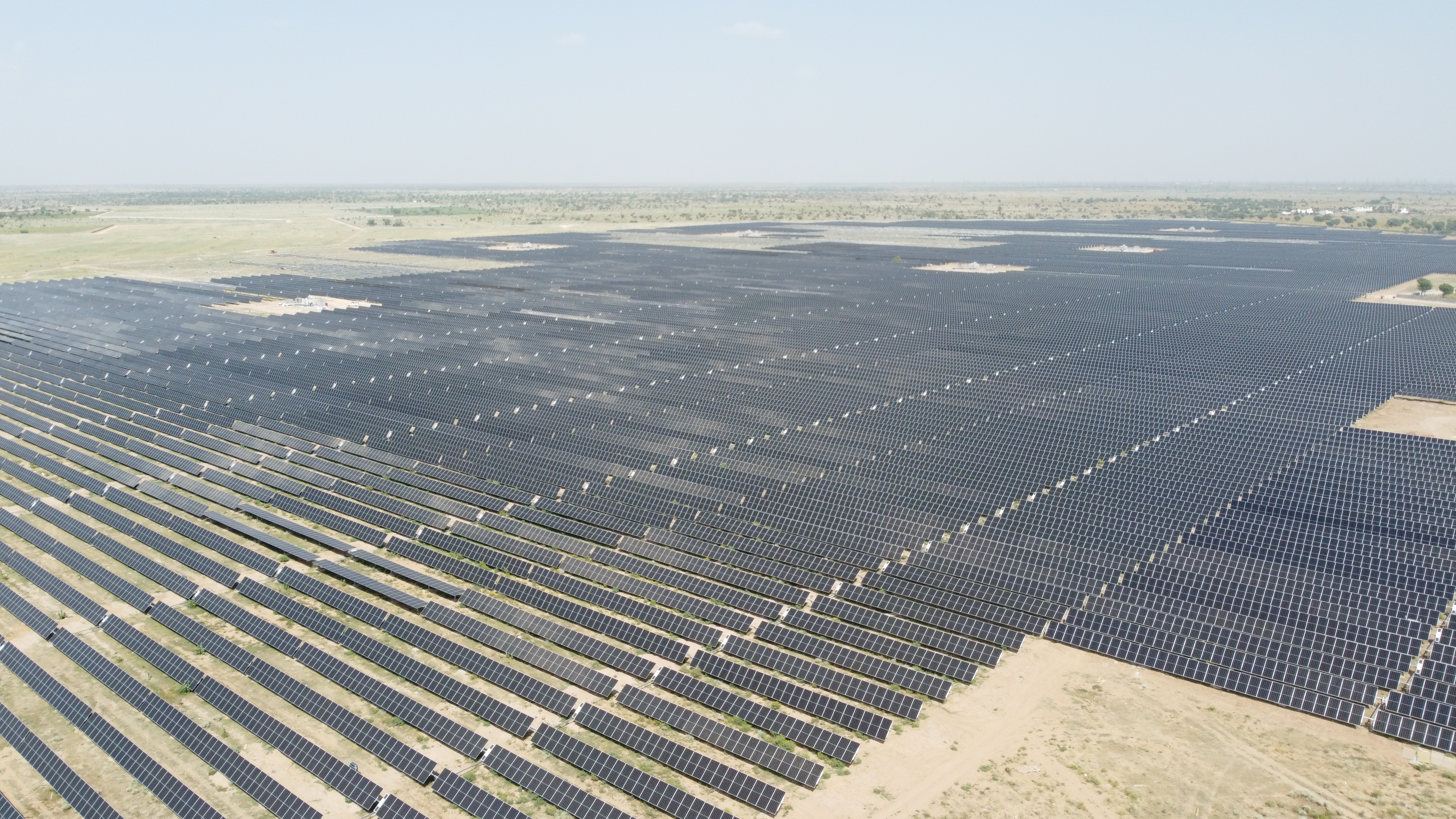
- Country: India
- Location: Bhadla, Rajasthan
- Coordinates: 27.485071°N 71.997756°E
- Construction began: 2021
- Commission date: 2023
- Owner: AMPIN Energy Transition

Solar farm
- Type: Flat-panel PV

Power generation
- Nameplate capacity: 100 MW

AMPIN Energy Bhadla Solar Power Plant (also known as AMPIN Energy Green Four Solar Power Plant) is a photovoltaic power station in Bhadla, Jodhpur district, India.

== History ==
The 100 MW solar plant has been built at the phase 2 of the Bhadla Solar Park by AMPIN Energy India. It is supported by the Bhadla-II PS 220 kV section line. In 2022, the operator of the plant signed a power purchase agreement with Amazon India to supply power through the Inter State Transmission System (ISTS).
