= NTPC Bhadla Solar Power Plant =

Photovoltaic power station in Bhadla, India

- Country: India
- Location: Bhadla, Rajasthan
- Coordinates: 27.485071°N 71.997756°E
- Construction began: 2021
- Commission date: 2017
- Operator: National Thermal Power Corporation

Solar farm
- Type: Flat-panel PV

Power generation
- Nameplate capacity: 260MW

NTPC Bhadla Solar Power Plant is a photovoltaic power station in Bhadla, Jodhpur district, India.

== History ==
The 260 MW solar power plant is built by the National Thermal Power Corporation at the Bhadla Solar Park, under the Ministry of New and Renewable Energy's Central Public Sector Undertaking (CPSU) Scheme Phase II.

Phase-by-phase commissioning;

- 45 MW commissioned in March 2017.
- 130 MW commissioned in April 2017.
- 55 MW commissioned in January 2018.
