= Power Finance Corporation =

Indian infrastructure finance company

Power Finance Corporation Ltd.

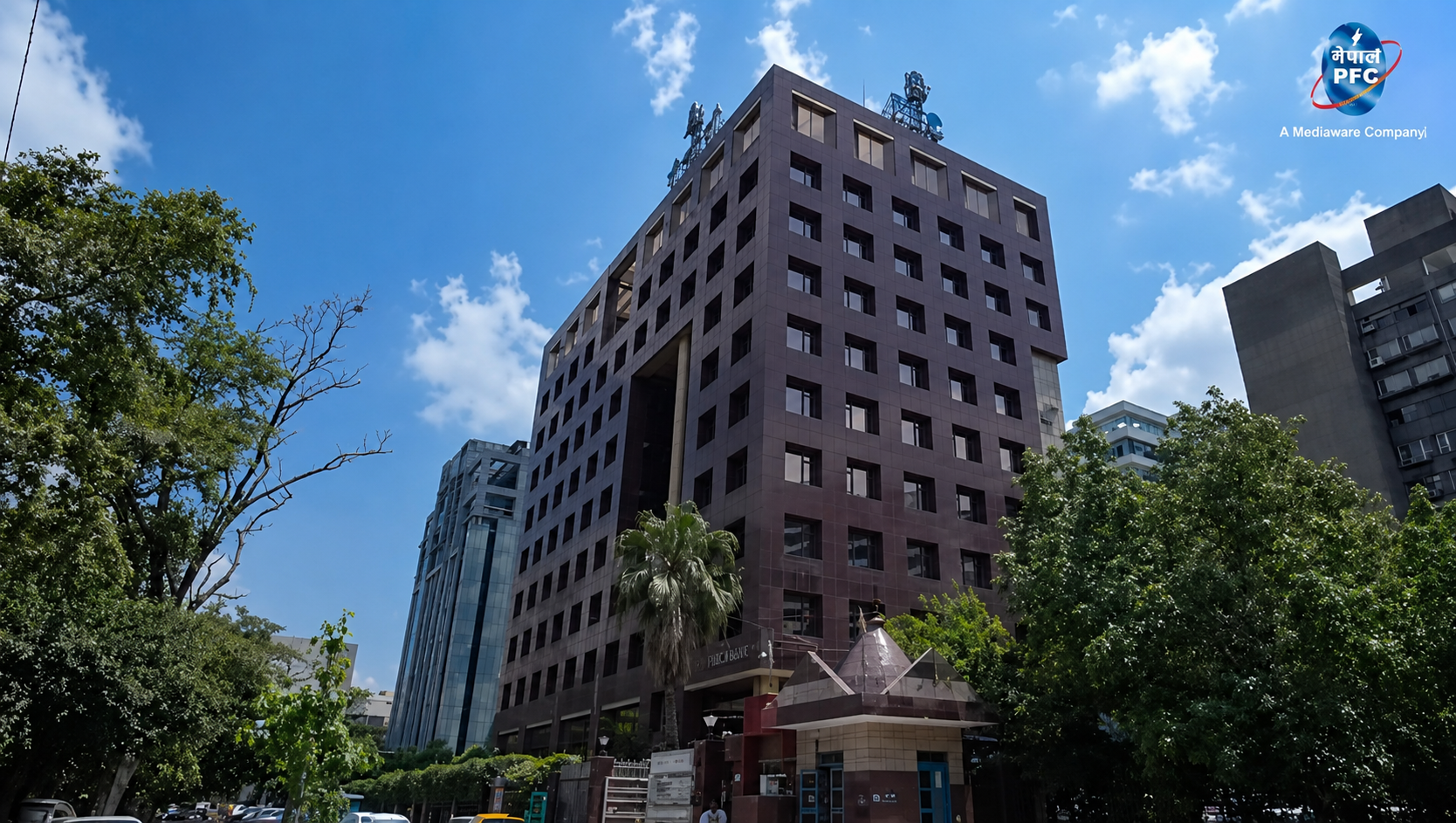
- Headquarters at 1 Barakhamba Lane in New Delhi
- Type: Public
- Traded as: NSE: PFC; BSE: 532810
- Industry: Financial services
- Founded: July 1986; 40 years ago
- Headquarters: New Delhi, India
- Area served: India
- Key people: Parminder Chopra (Chairman & MD)
- Products: Rupee Term Loan, Foreign Currency Loan, Short Term Loan
- Services: Financial Consulting, Financial Products, Investment Banking, Loan Management, Linkage Management
- Revenue: ▲₹107,000 crore (US$11 billion) (2025)
- Operating income: ▲₹33,588 crore (US$3.5 billion) (2024)
- Net income: ▲₹30,514 crore (US$3.2 billion) (2025)
- Total assets: ▲₹1,038,877 crore (US$110 billion) (2024)
- Total equity: ▲₹134,288 crore (US$14 billion) (2024)
- Owner: Government of India
- Number of employees: 550 (2024)
- Subsidiaries: Rural Electrification Corporation Limited
- Website: pfcindia.com

Power Finance Corporation Ltd. (PFC) is an Indian public sector undertaking and non-banking financial company (NBFC) under the Ministry of Power, Government of India. Established in 1986, The company provides financial assistance to projects across the power sector, including generation, transmission, distribution, and renewable energy. On 12 October 2021, PFC was conferred “Maharatna” status.

Initially wholly owned by the Government of India, PFC launched one of the largest IPOs by any Indian CPSU in January 2007. It is listed on both the Bombay Stock Exchange (BSE) and the National Stock Exchange (NSE). On 6 December 2018, the Government approved PFC’s acquisition of Rural Electrification Corporation Limited (REC). The deal was finalized on 28 March 2019, with PFC acquiring the Government of India’s 52.63% stake in REC.

== Organization structure ==
The corporation is headed by the Chairman and Managing Director, currently Parminder Chopra. It operates through three main divisions: the Commercial Division, which handles credit appraisal, borrower categorization, sector reforms, and analysis; the Projects Division, which manages operations across states and appraises new projects; and the Finance Division, which oversees fund mobilization and disbursement. PFC is a lean organization with approximately 550 employees as of 31 March 2023.

== Borrowings ==
Most of the corporation’s funds are raised through rupee-denominated bonds, which carry the highest credit ratings in both domestic and international markets, on par with India’s sovereign rating. It also borrows from banks and other financial institutions, and has raised external commercial borrowings (ECBs) through private placements in U.S. markets. PFC is among the institutions authorized to raise funds through capital gains tax bonds under Section 54EC of the Income Tax Act, 1961.

In recent years, PFC has focused on diversifying its borrowing portfolio by tapping international markets. In November 2017, it issued its debut Green Bond worth US$400 million, which achieved the tightest spread for an Indian issuer on a maiden 10-year issue. In the first quarter of the 2020 financial year, it raised about US$1.3 billion internationally, including a landmark US$1 billion dual-tranche bond in June 2019, the first and largest such transaction by a government-owned Indian NBFC. This was also its first international borrowing since the successful acquisition of REC.

In 2017, PFC became the first company to receive approval from the Ministry of Finance (India) to raise funds under Section 54EC of the Income Tax Act, following the Union Budget announcement that year. Since then, it has raised more than US$14.7 million through these bonds.

== Operations ==
Since its inception, PFC has been providing financial assistance to power projects across India, including generation, transmission, distribution, and Renovation, Modernization, and Upgradation initiatives. More recently, it has extended financing to infrastructure projects with strong linkages to the power sector, such as coal mine development, fuel transportation, and oil and gas pipelines. Its borrower base includes State Electricity Boards, state and central sector utilities, and private companies. PFC also acts as the nodal agency for flagship government programs, including the Ultra Mega Power Projects and the Restructured Accelerated Power Development and Reforms Programme. It has also developed a system for rating the performance of state power utilities.
