= Gujarat Hybrid Renewable Energy Park =

Renewable energy plant in Gujarat

- Country: India
- Location: Vighakot, Kutch district, Gujarat
- Coordinates: 24°07′N 69°21′E
- Status: Under construction
- Construction began: 15 December 2020; 5 years ago
- Commission date: 2029; 3 years' time
- Construction cost: ₹150,000 crore (US$16 billion)

Solar farm
- Type: Flat-panel PV

Wind farm
- Type: Onshore
- Site usage: Wasteland
- Site area: 72,600 ha (726 km^{2})

Power generation
- Units planned: 1 × 30000 MW
- Nameplate capacity: 30000 MW

External links
- Commons: Related media on Commons

The Gujarat Hybrid Renewable Energy Park or Khavda Solar Park is a renewable energy park under construction near Vighakot village in Kutch district of Gujarat, India. Slated to be the world's largest hybrid renewable energy park, it is being built on 72,600 hectares (179,000 acres) of waste land. It is expected to generate 30 gigawatts (GW) from solar panels and wind turbines, enough to power 18 million Indian homes. 1 GW capacity was commissioned in March 2024. As of April 2026, its capacity has increased to 9.4 GW.

The Power Grid Corporation of India will manage the electric power transmission. The park is expected to generate 100,000 jobs and attract an investment of ₹150,000 crore (US$16 billion). It also accounts for 5 crore tonnes carbon emission reductions each year. The government also has plans to install 14 GWh grid-scale battery storage system.

Separately, Adani Green Energy reported that its operational battery energy storage capacity at Khavda reached 3.37 GWh on 26 May 2026.

The Ministry of Power plans to spend ₹18,598 crore (US$2.0 billion) to build infrastructure to move 7 gigawatt from the park.

Composition of the park
Zones	Total land (hectares)	Developers	Allocated land (hectares)	Permitted capacity (MW)	Installed capacity (MW)
Hybrid wind-solar power zone	49,600	Adani Green Energy (AGEL)	19,000	9,500	2,824
Hybrid wind-solar power zone	49,600	Sarjan Realities	9,500	4,750	
Hybrid wind-solar power zone	49,600	NTPC	9,500	4,750	212.5
Hybrid wind-solar power zone	49,600	Gujarat Industries Power Company (GIPCL)	4,750	2,375	
Hybrid wind-solar power zone	49,600	Gujarat State Electricity Corporation	6,650	3,325	
Wind power zone	23,000	Solar Energy Corporation of India will invite competitive bidding	23,000	11,500	

== History ==
The proposal of the park was approved by the Government of Gujarat on 9 September 2020, allocating 60,000 hectares (600 km^{2}) of land. The proposal had mentioned total 41.5 gigawatt capacity. The foundation stone of the project was laid on 15 December 2020 by Indian Prime Minister Narendra Modi. The 30-km road leading to park was constructed. In March 2024, AGEL commissioned 1 GW capacity which needed the installation of 2.4 million photovoltaic modules. AGEL had secured funding for the construction 2.1 GW capacity. GIPCL's 600 MW capacity is under construction. The first 250 MW wind power came online in July 2024. In August 2025, NTPC Green commissioned 212.5 MW capacity. In March 2026, the installed capacity increased to 9.4 GW, and the entire project is slated to be completed by 2029.

== See also ==
- Solar power in Gujarat
- List of photovoltaic power stations
- Ultra Mega Solar Power Projects
