= Avantha Korba West Power Station =

Coordinates: 21.741°N 83.275°E

Avantha Korba West Power Station is a power project located near Kirorimalnagar railway station in Raigarh district in Indian state of Chhattisgarh. The power plant is one of the coal based power plants of Korba West Power Company Limited, a wholly owned subsidiary of Gautam Thapar led Avantha Group.

BHEL is EPC contractor for this power plant. Coal for the power plant is sourced from South Eastern Coalfields.

On 07-Sep-2019, Adani Power Limited got approval from NCLT to become new owner of this project.

== Capacity ==
Its planned capacity is 1200 MW (2x600 MW).

Unit Number	Capacity (MW)	Date of Commissioning	Status
1	600	2013 October	Running.
2	600		under construction.

== Extortion calls ==
Extortion calls in April 2015 for ‘protection money’ for the Rs. 42 000 crore acquisition agreement, between Avantha Group and Adani Power Limited for Avantha Korba West Power Station, led to the arrest of a senior corporate executive of a Thapar-Avantha Group company.
