= Kurnool Ultra Mega Solar Park =

3rd Largest Solar Park in India

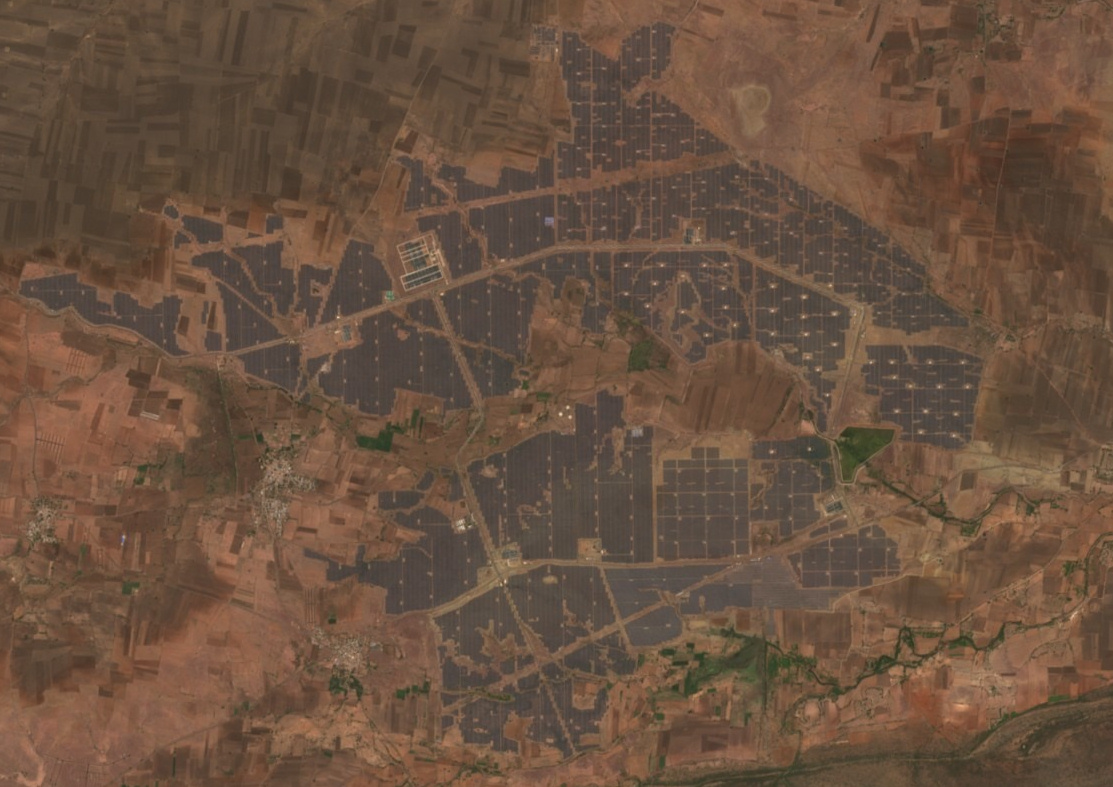
- Country: India
- Location: Kurnool district, Andhra Pradesh
- Coordinates: 15.681522°N 78.283749°E
- Status: Operational
- Commission date: 17 May 2022; 4 years ago
- Owner: Andhra Pradesh Solar Power Corporation Private Limited (APSPCL)

Solar farm
- Type: Flat-panel PV
- Site resource: 5.5–6.0 kW⋅h/m^{2}/d
- Site area: 24 km^{2} (9.3 sq mi)

Power generation
- Units operational: 1000 MW
- Nameplate capacity: 1000 MW

External links
- Website: apspcl.ap.gov.in/content/kurnoolultramegasolarparks
- Commons: Related media on Commons

Kurnool Ultra Mega Solar Park in Andhra Pradesh is a solar park spread over a total area of 24 square kilometres (9.3 sq mi) in Panyam mandal of Kurnool district, Andhra Pradesh, with a capacity of 1000 MW. It was inaugurated by then chief minister of Andhra Pradesh Nara Chandrababu Naidu in 2019 The park was built at an investment of around ₹70 billion (US$730 million) by solar power developers and the Central and State governments. Solar power developers invested ₹10 billion (US$100 million), while the remaining ₹60 billion (US$620 million) was funded by APSPCL supported by a ₹2 billion (US$21 million) grant from the Union Government.

== Description ==
The Kurnool Solar Park is spread over a total area of 24 km^{2} (9.3 sq mi) in the Gani and Sakunala villages of Kurnool district. The region is arid. The park utilizes over 4 million solar panels with capacities of 315 and 320 watts. The panels are connected to four 220/33 kV pooling stations of 250 MW each and a 400/220 kV grid substation through nearly 2,000 circuit kilometres (1,200 mi) of cables. During a sunny day, the Kurnool Solar Park is able to generate more than 8 GW⋅h of electricity, which is sufficient to meet virtually the entire electricity demand in Kurnool district.

== Auction and commissioning ==
NTPC Limited invited bids from solar power developers for the first phase of the park on 29 April 2015, and the second phase on 21 May 2015. In total, NTPC auctioned 1,000 MW of capacity through a reverse auction. The contracts were awarded to solar power developers in mid-December 2015. 500 MW was awarded to SunEdison (as a part of bankruptcy acquired by Greenko) and 350 MW to Softbank Energy (both at rate ₹4.63/kW), 100 MW to Azure Power and 50 MW to Adani Power (at rates of ₹5.12/kW⋅h and ₹5.13/kW⋅h respectively).

350 MW capacity was commissioned on 29 March 2017 by Softbank Energy. Azure Power had begun construction of 100 MW capacity at the park in December 2016, and commissioned the plant by 13 June 2017. The commissioning of 100 MW by Azure Power takes the generating capacity of the park to 950 MW, which made it the largest solar park in the world, at the time.

The solar park was damaged by a gale and thunderstorm in Kurnool district on 7 May 2017. Strong winds uprooted some solar panels installed by Softbank and Greenko, and also damaged staff quarters and workers facilities. The damage to the solar park caused by the extreme weather was estimated at ₹20 million (US$210,000).

The remaining 50 MW capacity had been awarded to Prayatna Developers, a subsidiary of Adani Power. The company commissioned 30 MW of capacity at the park on 28 June and the remaining 20 MW in July 2017.

Over 2,500 skilled and unskilled workers were employed to construct the Kurnool Ultra Mega Solar Park.

== See also ==
- Power sector of Andhra Pradesh
- NP Kunta Ultra Mega Solar Park
- Kadapa Ultra Mega Solar Park
