= Dholera Solar Park =

Planned solar plant in India

Dholera Solar Park is a planned, large scale solar project in Dholera Special Investment Region (DSIR), Gujarat. It is categorised as an Ultra Mega Solar Power Project, by the Ministry of New and Renewable Energy of the Central Government of India; the capacity will be 5 GW by 2030.

== History ==
=== Background ===
The Government of India has a target of increasing power generated from renewable energy sources to 175 GW by 2022. The National Solar Mission (NSM) has a target of achieving 100GW of grid-connected power generation from solar energy by 2022. India originally had a target of 20GW by 2022; this target was achieved with four years to go. Following this the Narendra Modi government increased the target to 100GW.

The Chief Minister of Gujarat approved the Dholera Solar Park in April 2018.

=== Auctions ===
Auctions have been held in 2020. An excess response of 600 MW was seen. The discovered tariff was between ₹2.78 (equivalent to ₹3.00 or 3.4¢ US in 2023) and ₹2.81 (equivalent to ₹3.00 or 3.4¢ US in 2023) per unit. Five companies were allotted 100-200MW each. However following lower tariffs of ₹1.99 (equivalent to ₹2.00 or 2.3¢ US in 2023) per unit during subsequent auctions, the original contracts were cancelled and new tenders were placed. In 2018 and 2019 similar cancellations in Gujarat had taken place. These cancelled contracts in Gujarat have resulted Uttar Pradesh also cancelling bids of a 500 MW solar auction.

== See also ==
- Tata Power Dholera Solar PV Station
