= Ultra Mega Power Projects =

Thermal power plants in India

Ultra Mega Power Projects (UMPP) are a series of ambitious power stations planned by the Government of India. This would entail the creation of an additional capacity of at least 100,000 MW by 2022. Ultra Mega Power projects, each with a capacity of 4000 MW or above, are being developed with the aim of bridging this gap.

The UMPPs are seen as an expansion of the MPP (Mega Power Projects) projects that the Government of India undertook in the 1990s, but met with limited success. The Ministry of Power, in association with the Central Electricity Authority and Power Finance Corporation Ltd., has launched an initiative for the development of coal-based UMPP's in India. These projects will be awarded to developers on the basis of competitive bidding.

Based on supercritical technology, 16,000 MW of capacity has been contracted through the competitive bidding process for UMPPs. The average tariff for these projects is in the range of ₹2-3 per kWh which is much lower than the recent cost plus tariffs. The first UMPP, developed by Tata Power at Mundra, Gujarat has been commissioned and contributes 4,000 MW in power to the Western grid.

== Special purpose vehicles ==
Special purpose vehicles (SPV) have been set up as wholly owned subsidiaries of the Power Finance Corporation for each UMPP that will be built. The SPV obtains various clearances, water linkage, coal mine allocation (for domestic coal based projects) etc. for the project. The SPV also initiates action for land acquisition in the name of the SPV, selects the developer through a tariff based competitive bidding process and finally transfers the SPV to the identified developer along with the various clearances, tie ups, etc. The developer is then responsible to build–own–operate (BOO) these UMPP plants.

== List of UMPPs ==
According to the Power Finance Corporation, 15 UMPPs are envisioned. As of July 2012, 12 SPVs had been formed. Currently, two UMPPs have been commissioned. The table below shows the status of the 12 UMPPs for which SPVs have been formed.

Name of UMPP	Special Purpose Vehicle (SPV)	State	Owner	Capacity in MW	Fuel source	Status
Bhedabahal Ultra Mega Power Project	Orissa Integrated Power Ltd.	Odisha	Not yet awarded	4,000	local coal mine	Bids invited by Government of India.
Cheyyur Ultra Mega Power Project	Coastal Tamil Nadu Power Ltd.	Tamil Nadu	Not yet awarded	4,000	Imported coal	Bids invited by Government of India.
Etah Ultra Mega Power Project	Coastal Uttar Pradesh Power Ltd.	Uttar Pradesh	Not yet awarded	4,000	Imported coal	Bids invited by Government of India.
Ghogarpalli Ultra Mega Power Project	Ghogarpalli Integrated Power Co. Ltd.	Odisha	Not yet awarded	4,000	local coal mine	Proposed
Girye Ultra Mega Power Project	Coastal Maharashtra Mega Power Ltd.	Maharashtra	Not yet awarded	4,000	Imported coal	Deferred
Kakwara Ultra Mega Power Project	Bihar Mega Power Limited	Bihar	Not yet awarded	4,000	local coal mine	Proposed
Krishnapatnam Ultra Mega Power Project	Coastal Andhra Power Ltd.	Andhra Pradesh	Reliance Power	3,960	Imported coal	Deferred or Postponed
Mundra Ultra Mega Power Project	Coastal Gujarat Power Ltd.	Gujarat	Tata Power	4,000	Imported coal	All 5 units (5x800 MW) are fully functional.
Nayunipalli Ultra Mega Power Project	Tatiya Andhra Mega Power Ltd.	Andhra Pradesh	Not yet awarded	4,000	Imported coal	Proposed
Sakhigopal Ultra Mega Power Project	Sakhigopal Integrated Power Co. Ltd.	Odisha	Not yet awarded	4,000	Imported coal	Proposed
Sasan Ultra Mega Power Project	Sasan Power Ltd.	Madhya Pradesh	Reliance Power	3,960	local coal mine	All 6 units (6x660 MW) are fully operational
Surguja Ultra Mega Power Project	Chhattisgarh Surguja Power Ltd.	Chhattisgarh	Not yet awarded	4,000	local coal mine	Uncertain
Tadri Ultra Mega Power Project	Coastal Karnataka Power Ltd.	Karnataka	Not yet awarded	4,000	Imported coal	Deferred
Tilaiya Ultra Mega Power Project	Jharkhand Integrated Power Ltd.	Jharkhand	Reliance Power	3,960	local coal mine	Unknown. Reliance quit.

== Operational costs ==
The project is being developed with the intention of providing power to consumers at minimum cost. Because of the huge size of these power plants, the cost of the electricity would be lower due to the economies of scale. The plants are estimated to cost roughly ₹15,000 crores each to set up. The cost of generation per unit is estimated at under ₹2.

== See also ==
- Ultra Mega Solar Power Projects
