= Bunyu Airport =

Indonesian Airport

Bunyu Airport Bandar Udara Bunyu
- IATA: BYQ; ICAO: WAQB

Summary
- Location: Bunyu, Bulungan, North Kalimantan, Indonesia
- Elevation AMSL: 118 ft (36 m)
- Coordinates: 3°27′21″N 117°52′02″E
- Interactive map of Bunyu Airport

Runways
Direction	Length		Surface
Direction	ft	m	Surface
04/22	3,281	1,000	asphalt

Bunyu Airport is an airport located in Bunyu, Bulungan Regency, North Kalimantan, Indonesia.

== Airlines and destinations ==
The following airlines offer passenger service.

Airlines	Destinations
Susi Air	Tarakan
