= Mundra Thermal Power Station =

Indian coal-based power plant

Mundra Thermal Power energy Station
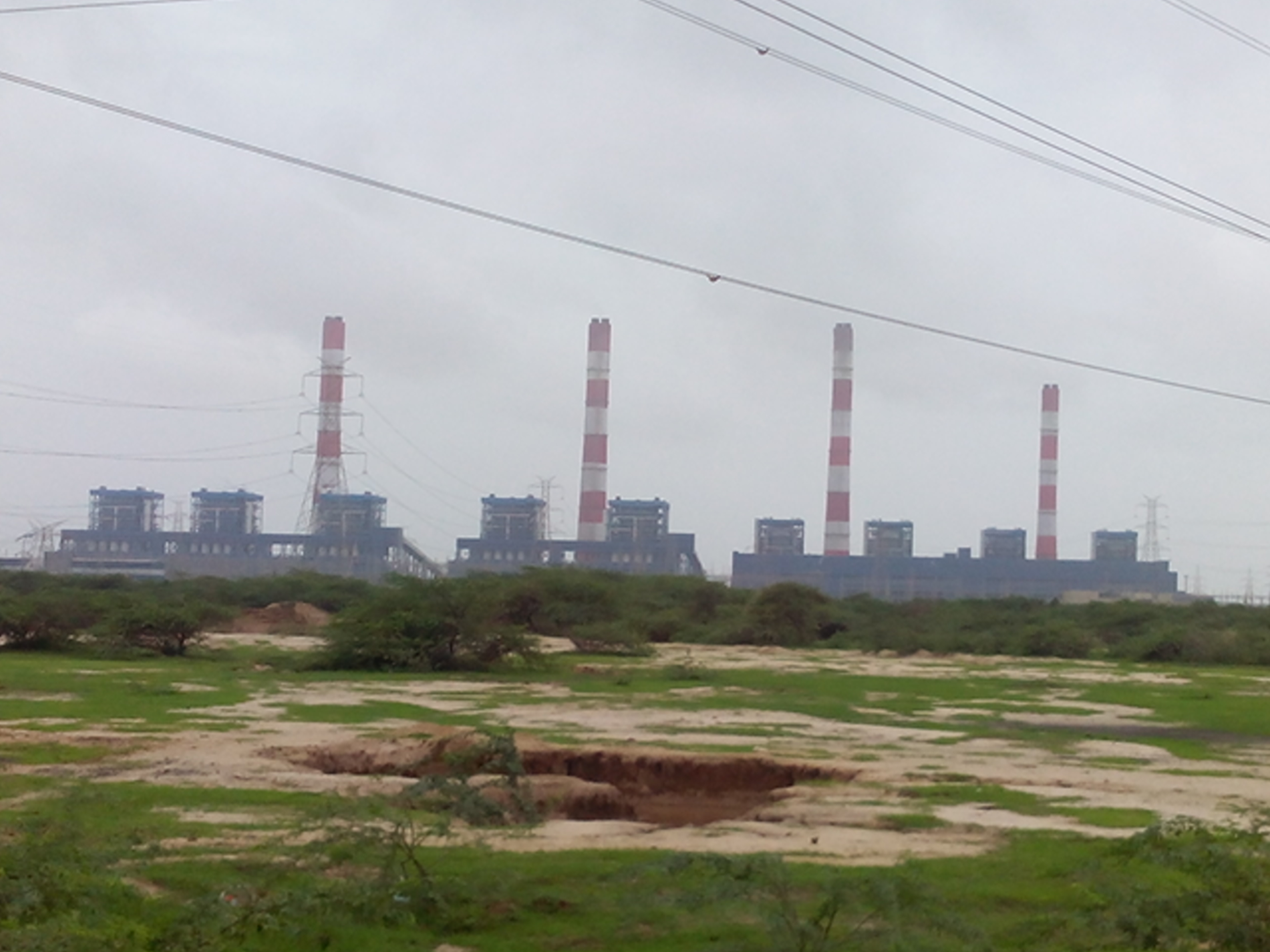
- Mundra Thermal Power Station from distance
- Country: India
- Location: Mundra, Gujarat
- Coordinates: 22°49′22″N 69°33′10″E
- Status: Operational
- Owner: Adani Power
- Operator: Adani Power

Thermal power station
- Primary fuel: Coal

Power generation
- Units operational: 4 × 330 MW; 5 × 660 MW
- Nameplate capacity: 4,620 MW

External links
- Commons: Related media on Commons

Mundra Thermal Power Station is located at Mundra in Kutch district in the Indian state of Gujarat. The power plant is one of the coal-based power plants of Adani Power. The coal for the power plant is imported primarily from Bunyu, Indonesia. Source of water for the power plant is sea water from the Gulf of Kutch.

It is the world's 11th-largest single location coal-based thermal power plant as well as India's second largest operational power plant after NTPC Vindhyanchal.

== Capacity ==
The plant has nine power generating units, unit# 5 to 9 involves super-critical boiler technology.

In July 2012 Adani Power have requested Central Electricity Regulatory Commission to increase the power tariff due to increase in price of coal imported from Indonesia.

Stage	Unit Number	Installed Capacity (MW)	Date of Commissioning
1st	1	330	2009 May
1st	2	330	2010
2nd	3	330	2010 July
2nd	4	330	2010 Nov
3rd	5	660	2010 December
3rd	6	660	2011 June
4th	7	660	2011 October
4th	8	660	2012
4th	9	660	2012 March
Total	Nine	4620	

== See also ==
- Mundra Ultra Mega Power Project owned by Tata Power
- Mundra Port
