= NP Kunta Ultra Mega Solar Park =

Solar park in Andhra Pradesh, India

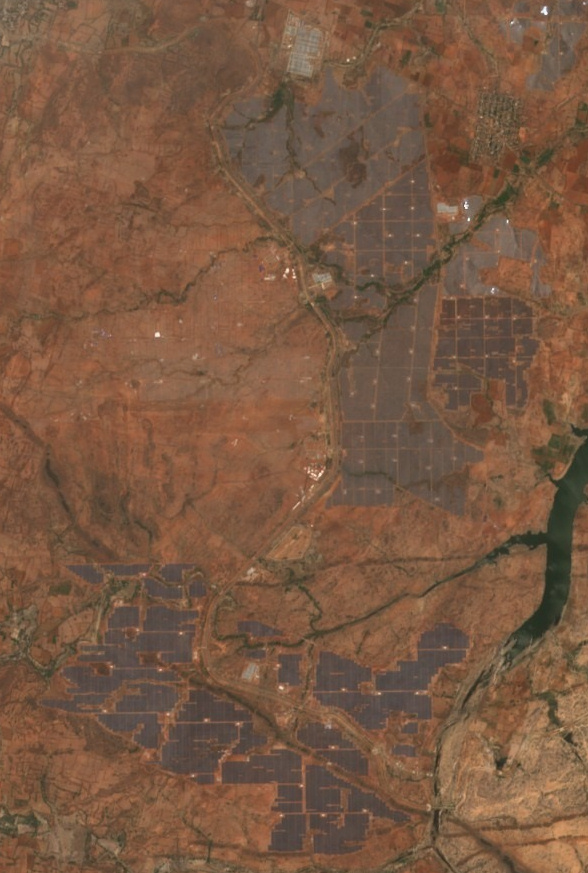
- Official name: Ananthapur Ultra Mega Solar Park
- Country: India
- Location: Nambulapulakunta mandal, Sri Sathya Sai district, Andhra Pradesh
- Coordinates: 14°01′55″N 78°26′09″E
- Commission date: 9 May 2016
- Owner: Andhra Pradesh Solar Power Corporation Private Limited (APSPCL)

Solar farm
- Type: Flat-panel PV
- Site resource: 5.5–6.0 kW⋅h/m^{2}/d
- Site area: 32 km^{2} (12 sq mi)

Power generation
- Units operational: 978.5 MW
- Units planned: 1500 MW
- Units under const.: MW

External links
- Website: apspcl.ap.gov.in/content/npkuntasite

The NP Kunta Ultra Mega Solar Park, also known as Ananthapuram - I Ultra Mega Solar Park or Kadiri Ultra Mega Solar Park, is a solar park occupying a total area of 32 square kilometres (12 sq mi) in Nambulapulakunta mandal, Annamayya district of the Indian state of Andhra Pradesh it is 43 km away from Rayachoti.

The first phase of the park was commissioned on 9 May 2016 with a capacity of 200 MW. An additional 50 MW capacity was commissioned on 29 July 2016. A further 750 MW was planned to have been commissioned by March 2018 in the second phase.

In August 2016, Tata Power Solar commissioned a 100 MW solar project at the park built over an area of 200 hectares (500 acres). This was the largest solar project commissioned using domestically manufactured solar cells and modules at the time.

In May 2018, Azure Power commissioned a 50 MW solar capacity at the park. In July 2018, Tata Power commissioned another 100 MW capacity, taking total commissioned capacity to 500 MW.

In July 2018, 750 MW were awarded for installation at ₹2.71/kW⋅h.

As of 30 April 2021, 978.5 MW capacity was commissioned by the following companies: Sprng Agnitra (250 MW), Ayana Solar (228.5 MW), SB Energy Solar (250 MW) and NTPC (250 MW). Another 400 MW was installed by Tatas (100 MW), ACME (150 MW), Azure (50 MW) and FRV Ltd (100 MW) at adjacent Galiveedu Solar Park which is not part of NP Kunta Solar Park.

== See also ==
- Power sector of Andhra Pradesh
- Kadapa Ultra Mega Solar Park
- Kurnool Ultra Mega Solar Park
