= Ministry of Power =

Ministry of Power may refer to:

- Ministry of Power (India)
- Ministry of Power (West Bengal), India
- Ministry of Power (United Kingdom)
- Ministry of Power and Energy, Sri Lanka
