= Kadapa Ultra Mega Solar Park =

Photovoltaic power stations in India

- Country: India
- Location: Mylavaram mandal Kadapa district, Andhra Pradesh
- Coordinates: 14°54′59″N 78°17′31″E
- Status: Operational
- Commission date: 2018
- Owner: Andhra Pradesh Solar Power Corporation Private Limited (APSPCL)

Solar farm
- Type: Flat-panel PV
- Site resource: 5.5-6.0 kWh/m^{2} per day
- Site area: 5,930 acres (2,400 ha)

Power generation
- Units operational: 250 MW
- Units under const.: 750 MW
- Nameplate capacity: 1,000 MW

External links
- Website: www.apspcl.ap.gov.in/content/kadapa-ultra-mega-solar-park-1000-mw-1

Kadapa Ultra Mega Solar Park is a solar park spread over a total area of 5,927.76 acres (23.9888 km^{2}) in the Mylavaram mandal of Kadapa district, Andhra Pradesh.

The project is being implemented by the Andhra Pradesh Solar Power Corporation Private Limited (APSPCL), a joint venture of Solar Energy Corporation of India (SECI), Andhra Pradesh Power Generation Corporation and the New & Renewable Energy Development Corporation of Andhra Pradesh Ltd.

A 1,000 MW solar park at Kadapa was approved by the Union Government in August 2015. NTPC Limited invited bids from solar power developers to develop 250 MW capacity in March 2016, and 650 MW capacity in July 2016.

The auction for 250 MW concluded on 11 April 2017. NTPC awarded the contract to French firm Solairedirect for a record-low tariff of INR 3.15 per kWh, beating the previous low of INR 3.29 per kWh awarded in auctions for the Rewa Solar Park on 10 February 2017. The price is the levellized tariff for 25 years. Although the Rewa contract was awarded at a cost of INR 2.97 per kWh, the levellized tariff over the contract's 25 year period amounts to INR 3.30 per kWh.

In January 2017, SECI issued India's first grid-scale solar-plus-storage tender to install 5MW/2.5MWh battery energy storage systems to two separate solar projects of 50 MW each in the park.

The project has been delayed due to Andhra Pradesh discoms refusing to purchase the power generated at the solar plant. Discoms argue that solar tariffs have dropped considerably since the auction for the Kadapa park took place and prefer to source power from other sources.

In February 2020, 250 MW capacity was commissioned by Solairedirect and the remaining 750 MW is under various stages of construction.

== See also ==
- Power sector of Andhra Pradesh
- NP Kunta Ultra Mega Solar Park
- Kurnool Ultra Mega Solar Park
