= Adani Power =

Indian multinational Electricity company in Ahmedabad, India pvt ltd

Adani Power Limited
- Type: Public
- Traded as: BSE: 533096; NSE: ADANIPOWER
- ISIN: INE814H01011
- Industry: Energy; Renewable Energy
- Founded: 22 August 1996; 30 years ago
- Headquarters: Shantigram, Khodiyar, Ahmedabad, Gujarat, India
- Key people: Gautam Adani (chairman); Anil Sardana (MD & CEO)
- Products: Electricity generation and distribution; Wind power; Energy trading
- Revenue: ▼₹58,905 crore (US$6.1 billion) (2025)
- Operating income: ▼₹16,359 crore (US$1.7 billion) (2025)
- Net income: ▼₹12,747 crore (US$1.3 billion) (2025)
- Total assets: ▲₹112,918 crore (US$12 billion) (2025)
- Total equity: ▲₹56,347 crore (US$5.9 billion) (2025)
- Number of employees: 4,210 (2025)
- Parent: Adani Group
- Website: www.adanipower.com

Adani Power Limited is an Indian multinational power and energy company, subsidiary of Adani Group and based in Khodiyar in Ahmedabad, India. It is a private thermal power producer, with a capacity of 15,250 MW and operates a mega solar plant of 40 MW at Naliya, Bitta, Kutch, Gujarat. Adani Godda Power is implementing a 1,600 MW plant at Jharkhand. The company has signed long term power purchase agreements of about 9,153 MW with the government of Gujarat, Maharashtra, Haryana, Rajasthan, Karnataka, and Punjab.

== History ==
Adani Power was started as a power trading company in 1996.

- 2009 – It started generation in July 2009 by RAM implementation of its first 330 MW of 4,620 MW at Mundra. This is the largest single location coal-based power project in India.
- 2010 – The company commissioned another three 330 MW by November 2010 and country's first supercritical unit of 660 MW on 22 December 2010, making its capacity 1,980 MW.
- 2011 – On 6 June 2011, it synchronised its second unit of 660 MW bringing the total generating capacity to 2,640 MW and on 2 October 2011, it synchronised its third super critical unit with national grid.
- 2012 – In February 2012, it commissioned the last unit of Mundra Project to take its capacity to 4,620 MW which made the Mundra TPP the largest privately held thermal power plant in the world and fifth largest on an overall basis, as of March 2012. This plant became the third-largest thermal power plant in the world after its completion.
- 2013 – In 2013, the company commissioned a 40 MW solar power project in Kutch, Gujarat. This is the largest solar power project in the country and marked the group's entry into the renewable energy sector.
- 2014 – On 3 April 2014, the company announced the commissioning of the fourth unit of 660 MW at its power plant at Tiroda in Maharashtra, thus emerging as the largest private power producer in India, with an overall installed capacity of 9,280 MW. The fifth unit was commissioned later in 2014.
- 2015 – the company announced the completion of acquisition of Udupi Power Corporation Limited on 11 May 2015. With this, Adani Power has a total commissioned capacity of 10,440 MW, making the company the largest private power producer in India.
- 2017 – In 2017, one of its units created a national record by continuously operating for 600 days.
- 2019 – In the fourth quarter ended on 31 March 2019, Adani Power reported a consolidated net profit of ₹634.64 crores. In the same fiscal the previous year, the company had reported a consolidated net loss of ₹653.25 crore.
- In 2024, Adani Power acquired Lanco Amarkantak.

== Operations ==
=== Built by Adani ===
- Mundra Thermal Power Station: 4,620 MW (4×330 MW + 5×660 MW) coal-based thermal power plant at Mundra, Kutch district, Gujarat. It operates first power transmission project of 400 kV Double Circuit Transmission System from the Mundra plant to Dehgam (430 km).
- Kawai Thermal Power Station: 1,320 MW (2×660 MW) coal-based thermal power plant at Kawai village, Baran district, Rajasthan.
- Tiroda Thermal Power Station: 3,300 MW (5×660 MW) coal-based thermal power plant at Tirora, Gondia district, Maharashtra. It is Maharashtra's largest coal-fired thermal power station.
- The company produces 40 MW of solar power in Bitta, Kutch Gujarat. This power plant was commissioned in 2011 within 165 days.

=== Taken over by Adani ===
- Udupi Power Plant: 1,200 MW (2×600 MW) coal-based thermal power plant at Padubidri, Udupi district, Karnataka. Bo from Lanco Infratech in August 2014 for ₹ 6,000 crores.
- Raikheda Thermal Power Station: On 2 August 2019, the firm completed the acquisition of GMR Chhattisgarh Energy Ltd. (GCEL) which owns and operates a power plant in Raikheda village in Raipur. The acquisition was concluded at an enterprise valuation of ₹ 3,530 crore. This addition has led to an increase in APL's total capacity to 12,450 MW. With this, APL has become the largest private sector thermal power producer.
- Avantha Korba West Power Station: The firm got approval from NCLT in 07-Sep-2019 to take over this plant.
- Adani Green House has rallied 29 percent after the announcement that the company has commissioned a 75MW wind power project.

== Future projects ==
As of January 2011, the company has 16,500 MW under implementation and planning stage. Included are a 3,300 MW coal-based TPP at Bhadreswar in Gujarat; a 2,640 MW TPP at Dahej, Gujarat; a 1,320 MW TPP at Chhindwara in Madhya Pradesh; a 2,500 MW TPP at Anugul, Orissa; a 2,000 MW TPP at Sambalpur, Orissa; and a 2,000 MW gas-based power project at Mundra, Gujarat. The company is bidding for a 1,000 MW lignite coal-based power plant in Kosovo.

In November 2017, Adani Power (Jharkhand) signed a long-term pact with Bangladesh Power Development Board to supply electricity from its upcoming 1,600 MW plant at Godda in Jharkhand.

As of 2019, the Adani Group is in talks with the Rural electrification Corporation (REC Limited) and Power Finance Corporation (PFC) to set up a 1600 MW Godda Power Project in Jharkhand at a cost of approximately Rs 14,000 crores.

In 2023, Adani awarded a 2x800MW order for their subsidiary Mahan Energen Limited formerly (Essar Mahan Power Plant) in Madhya Pradesh.

Again in 2024 Adani Power have awarded order for 2x800 MW thermal power plant (TPP) in Raipur, Chhattisgarh and 2x800 MW thermal power plant (TPP) in Mirzapur, Uttar Pradesh.

== Controversies ==
=== Allegations of stock manipulation ===
In January 2023, Hindenburg Research published the findings of a two-year investigation claiming that Adani had engaged in market manipulation and accounting malpractices; Hindenburg also disclosed that it was holding short positions on Adani Group companies. Bonds and shares of companies associated with Adani experienced a decline in value after the accusations. Adani denied the fraud allegations as unfounded and ill intentioned.

== Awards ==
In 2017, it was named the Most Innovative Young Power Professional by IPPAI (Independent Power Producers Association of India) at the 18th Regulators & Policymakers Retreat. In 2017, CSR Works International with support of British Chamber of Commerce and High Commission of Canada, recognized the firm for best sustainability reporting in Asia, in Singapore. In 2018, it received the Recognition for Best Environment Management practices by Srishti Publications.

== See also ==
- Electricity sector in India
- Fortune India 500
- List of companies of India
