= Dholera International Airport =

Future airport to serve Dholera, Gujarat, India

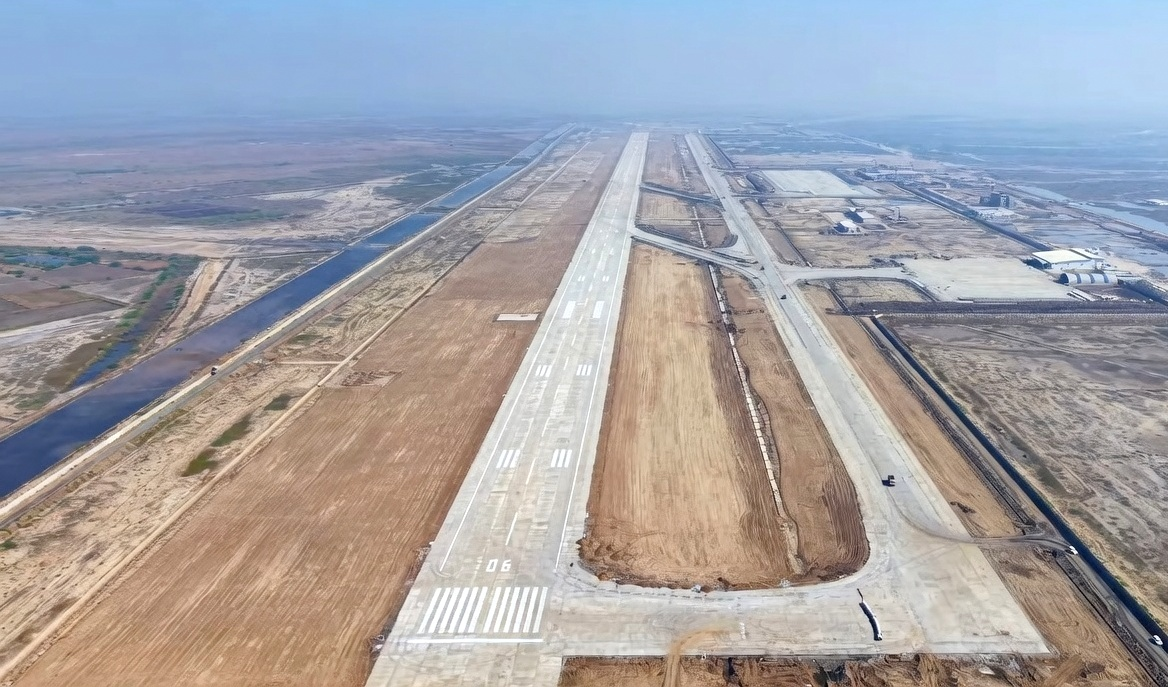
- Dholera International Airport Phase 1 Work-in-Progress, December 2025
- IATA: none; ICAO: none

Summary
- Airport type: Public
- Owner: Airports Authority of India
- Operator: Dholera International Airport Company Limited (DIACL)
- Serves: Dholera Special Investment Region; Ahmedabad; Gandhinagar
- Location: Dholera, Ahmedabad district, Gujarat, India
- Opened: December 2026; 2 months' time
- Coordinates: 22°21′25″N 72°18′12″E

Map
- Location of the airport in Gujarat Dholera International Airport (India)

Runways
Direction	Length		Surface
Direction	ft	m	Surface
	10,500	3,200

Dholera International Airport (IATA: none, ICAO: none) is an under-construction international airport and a greenfield airport, which will serve the Dholera Special Investment Region (DSIR) in Gujarat, India. It is being built near Navagam in the Dholera taluka of Ahmedabad district. The project site is spread over 1,426 hectares about 80 km (50 mi) from Ahmedabad and around 20 km (12 mi) from the Dholera Special Investment Region (DSIR). 75 hectares of government land has been allocated for commercial development.

The airport would serve the logistics requirements of the DSIR, which is planned as a huge industrial township in the Delhi–Mumbai Industrial Corridor (DMIC) project, as well as to relieve congestion of the existing Sardar Vallabhbhai Patel International Airport serving the cities of Ahmedabad and Gandhinagar, the capital of Gujarat. It is expected to be commissioned by December 2025.

== History ==
The Airports Authority of India (AAI) inspected the site in January 2010 to carry out a techno-economical feasibility study and gave its technical clearance the following month. The project received "site clearance" from the central government in July 2014. The Environment Ministry gave its approval in December 2015.

Dholera International Airport Company Limited (DIACL) was set up in 2012 by the State Government of Gujarat as a special-purpose vehicle to develop the airport. The Airports Authority of India picked up a 51% stake in DIACL in 2018. Following this, the Gujarat government holding dropped to 33% while the remaining 16% is held by the Delhi Mumbai Industrial Corridor Development Corporation (DMICDC).

=== Construction ===
The Airports Authority of India (AAI) signed a memorandum of understanding (MoU) with the State Government in January 2019 for the construction of airport. In 2021, the Airport Authority of India released a ₹987 crore (US$100 million) tender for Phase 1 of airport project. Phase 1 civil works involved construction of the airport’s infrastructure including a 3,200 metre long runway suitable for 4E category aircraft, taxiways, aprons and road network. The contract was awarded to Jodhpur-based Varaha Infrastructure in June 2021 which was the lowest bidder at ₹636.45 crore (US$66 million).

In June 2022, the Union Cabinet Committee on Economic Affairs approved the development of Phase I at an estimated cost of ₹1,305 crore (US$140 million), to be completed within 48 months.

In January 2024, DIACL awarded a ₹333 crore (US$35 million) EPC contract to Ahmedabad-based Yashnand Engineers and Contractors. The scope of the contract includes the construction of a new integrated passenger terminal building, air traffic control tower, cargo complex, and environmental support services among others, with a construction deadline of 18 months.
