= REC Limited =

Indian infrastructure finance company

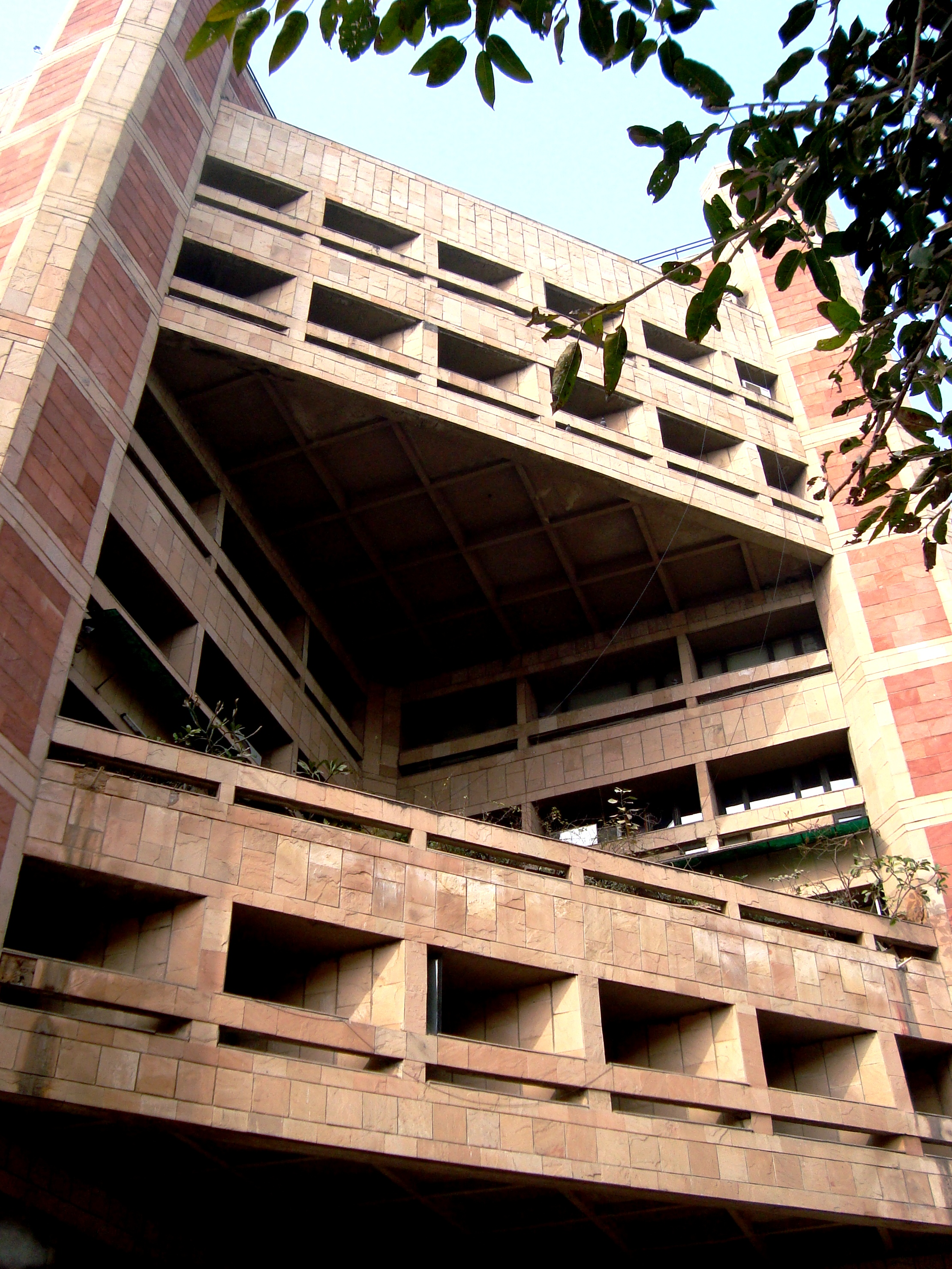
- REC's corporate office on Lodi Road, New Delhi
- Native name: आर ई सी लिमिटेड
- Formerly: Rural Electrification Corporation Limited
- Type: Public Subsidiary
- Traded as: BSE: 532955; NSE: RECLTD
- Industry: Infrastructure finance
- Founded: 25 July 1969; 57 years ago New Delhi, Delhi, India
- Defunct: April 1, 2027; 4 months' time
- Fate: Merged with Power Finance Corporation
- Headquarters: Core-4, SCOPE Complex, 7, Lodi Road, New Delhi, Delhi - 110003
- Area served: India
- Key people: Sh. Jitendra Srivastava(CMD)
- Revenue: ▲₹47,571.23 crore (US$5.1 billion) (2024)
- Operating income: ▲₹17,959.94 crore (US$1.9 billion) (2024)
- Net income: ▲₹14,145.46 crore (US$1.5 billion) (2024)
- Total assets: ▲₹548,191.09 crore (US$59 billion) (2024)
- Total equity: ▲₹69,350.25 crore (US$7.4 billion) (2024)
- Owner: Power Finance Corporation
- Number of employees: 513 (March 2024)
- Subsidiaries: REC Transmission Projects Company Limited (RECTPCL); REC Power Distribution Company Limited (RECPDCL)
- Website: recindia.nic.in

REC Limited, formerly Rural Electrification Corporation Limited, is an Indian public sector company that finances and promotes power projects across India. It loans to Central/State Sector Power Utilities, State Electricity Boards, Rural Electric Cooperatives, NGOs and Private Power Developers. It is a subsidiary of Power Finance Corporation (PFC) and is under administrative control of the Ministry of Power, Government of India.

On 20 March 2019, PFC agreed to acquire a 52.63% controlling stake in REC for ₹14,500 crore (US$1.5 billion). On 28 March, PFC announced it had paid for the acquisition and intended to merge with REC in 2020. However, REC has maintained that merging PFC-REC is no longer an option.

From 1 September 2023, REC has been included in the Morgan Stanley Capital International (MSCI) Global Standard Index.

REC has diversified into non-power infrastructure and logistics, now covering airports, metro, railways, ports, and bridges. REC has 22 regional offices..

== Business operations ==
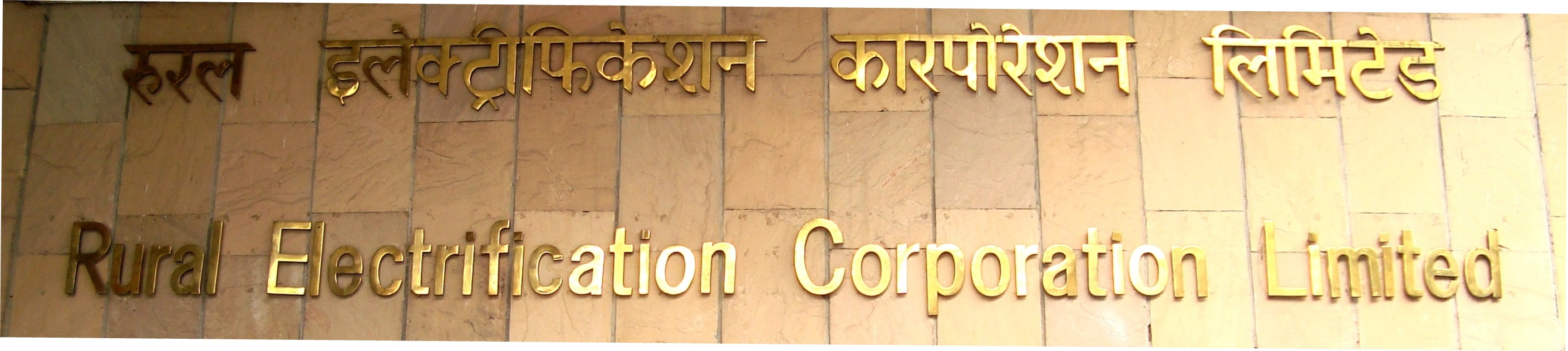

REC is the 12th Maharatna Company functioning under the purview of the Ministry of Power. The company is listed on both the National Stock Exchange and the Bombay Stock Exchange. Business operations in India are supported by 22 regional offices, with corporate headquarters at Gurugram and a registered office in New Delhi.

=== Services ===
The company primarily provides finance for rural electrification projects across India, loaning to Central/ State Sector Power Utilities, State Electricity Boards, Rural Electric Cooperatives, NGOs, and Private Power Developers. The company may be a non-primary financier of loans. It provides consultancy, project monitoring, and financial/technical appraisal, acting as a nodal agency for public schemes or projects. It audits financial requirements of transmission and distribution (T&D) utilities, and appraises T&D scheme financing. REC has financed system improvement, intensive electrification, pump-set energisation, and the APDRP Programme. The company also physically and financially monitors T&D schemes.

REC offers loans for renewable energy projects. The company has allocated a €100M (approximately ₹ 6000M) credit line with KfW under Indo-German Development Cooperation to finance renewable energy projects at concessional interest rates. Eligible projects include solar, wind, small hydro, biomass, and cogeneration/hybrid projects.

GARV (Grameen Vidyutikaran) APP is a mobile application developed by REC to aid the Grameen Vidyutikaran Mission. The app provides real-time updates on the electrification status of eighteen thousand UE villages, and launched on 14 October 2015.

=== Finances ===
The company was listed on the National Stock Exchange and the Bombay Stock Exchange on 12 March 2008. REC went for Initial Public Offer of 156,120,000 equity shares in February 2008 which was oversubscribed by about 27 times, raising a total amount of ₹819 crore. 171,732,000 more equity shares were released in February 2010. The issue was oversubscribed by 3.14 times, raising a total of ₹ 26.47 billion

The company is currently among the top 500 Global Financial Services brands by UK-based plc Brand Finance. The company is also among the Forbes Global 2000 companies for 2010. Domestic debt instruments of REC have been assigned "AAA" by credit rating agencies CRISIL, Fitch and ICRA. Moody’s and Fitch rated its international credit at par with India’s sovereign rating.

International collaborations include tie-ups for External Commercial Borrowings with Standard Chartered Bank (London), DEPFA Investment Bank Limited (Cyprus) etc. as well as current tie-ups with KfW (Germany) and Japan International Cooperation Agency (Japan) under Official Development Assistance. As an IFC, REC may issue infrastructure bonds and raise up to US$500M through External Commercial Borrowing in a year.

== History ==
=== Early years ===
REC was established in July 1969, amidst a critical drought situation in the late sixties. The company’s initial mandate was helping State Electricity Boards energise pump-sets across the country to boost agriculture and mitigate the impact of three successive years of deficient monsoons. The company also financed rural electrification, supporting planned programmes for increased agricultural production. Besides finance, REC also offered appraising, consultancy, technical support and monitoring of projects, to assist State Electricity Boards/Power Utilities, Rural Electric Cooperatives and other such institutions.

=== Post-Liberalised India (1990s) ===
Liberalisation by the Government of India (GoI) in 1991 saw amendment to existing laws and reform measures enabling the private sector to participate in large-scale manufacturing, services and infrastructure. Sectors like power, airports, seaports, roadways, projects were identified for private participation, and nodal agencies were set up for initial spade work, later handing over projects to private players through competitive bidding. In April 2006, GoI identified 14 transmission projects worth ₹ 200 billion for development by 2012. REC was identified as one of the two GoI-appointed nodal agencies for transferring identified projects to private developers. REC also started extending loans to manufacturers of transmission and distribution equipment.

=== 2000–Current ===
Till 2000, REC focused on the transmission and distribution, with projects for household electrification in rural and semi-urban areas, area electrification in tribal/Dalit areas, intensive electrification, and system improvement. REC's portfolio constituted mainly Mini/Micro generation projects up to 25MW capacity till 2000. In June 2002, the REC's mandate was expanded to financing all generation projects without limit on size or location. Today, financing of generation projects has become a growing focus for REC, also attracting its private sector borrowers.

Since 2005, REC has been appointed nodal agency by Ministry of Power for Government of India scheme Rajiv Gandhi Grameen Vidyutikaran Yojana. The scheme built rural electricity infrastructure and electrified households, supporting the National Common Minimum Programme goal of universal access to electricity. Under the scheme, a 90% capital subsidy is provided by Government of India for overall project cost. Cumulatively till FY10, works in 190,858 villages were completed with free connections to over 10 million impoverished households. The REC is the nodal agency under the SAUBHAGYA Yojana.

== REC Institute of Power Management & Training (RECIPMT) ==
In 1979, REC established a national training institute in Hyderabad for techno-managerial skill and efficiency in power utilities, and programmes for REC’s employees. CIRE served as an association platform for institutions working towards rural electrification and rural energy development.

Today, RECIPMT conducts regular programmes on transmission and distribution for power sector executives, including seminars for private and public utilities. Programmes focus on adoption of new technologies, training in conventional and non-conventional energy areas and practical demonstrations via an in-house Energy Park.

== Energy Efficiency Services Limited (EESL) ==
EESL is a joint venture (JV) with 4 power PSUs – REC, Powergrid, NTPC, and PFC for implementing energy efficiency projects, promoting usage of energy efficient appliances, promoting the concept of Energy Service Companies (ESCOs) etc.

== Indian Energy Exchange (IEX) ==
REC is an equity partner in Indian Energy Exchange (IEX), India's first nationwide, automated, and online electricity trading platform (power exchange / electricity market), among other reputed investors like IDFC, Adani, Reliance Energy, Lanco and Tata Power.

== See also ==
- Electricity sector in India
- Saubhagya scheme
