= Dholera =

- town
- Location in Gujarat, India Dholera (India)
- Coordinates: 22.248°N 72.195°E
- Country: India
- State: Gujarat
- District: Ahmedabad

Languages
  - Official: Gujarati
- Time zone: UTC+5:30 (IST)
- Postal code: 382455
- Vehicle registration: GJ
- Website: Dholera

Dholera is a town in Ahmedabad district of Gujarat state in India.

== History ==
=== Background ===
Dholera was also an ancient port-city in Gulf of Khambhat, 30 km. from Dhandhuka village of Ahmedabad district.

Shri Swaminarayan Mandir, Dholera is one of the nine temples built by Swaminarayan.

=== Smart city ===
Since 2011, the Government of Gujarat has been making plans to develop a smart city at Bhal area. The economic viability of the project has been questioned by farmer organisations. Several investors who initially signed the Memorandum of Understanding to develop the project, have withdrawn and refused to invest.

== Geography ==
The region is located in a low lying area and is flood prone. In August 2019, the area was waterlogged and remained cut off from other cities for three days.

== Planned infrastructure ==
Gujarat Government has proposed a new International Airport for Ahmedabad city at Fedara. The proposed international airport is to be strategically located near the planned SEZ project of the Adani Group at Dholera. A new seaport was initially proposed, but the plans have been abandoned.

In January 2021, a monorail project to link Ahmedabad and the Dholera Special Investment Region (DSIR) was approved. The ₹60 billion (US$620 million) Mass Rapid Transit System (MRTS) will run parallel to the expressway and have seventy stations.

In 2025, Dholera, along with Kutch, was identified as a suitable site for setting up launchpads for space exploration institutions by the government of Gujarat.

Tata Group is constructing a semiconductor chip fabrication plant in the town.

=== Dholera International Airport ===
Dholera International Airport, a greenfield airport is under construction near Navagam in the Dholera taluka of Ahmedabad district. The project site is spread over 1,426 hectares near Navagam village in Dholera taluka, about 80 km from Ahmedabad and around 20 km from the Dholera Special Investment Region (DSIR).

The Airports Authority of India (AAI) inspected the site in January 2010 to carry out a techno-economical feasibility study and gave its technical clearance. The Dholera International Airport Company Ltd (DIACL) was founded in 2013 to develop the airport. The central government approved the site in July 2014, the Environment Ministry gave its approval in December 2015.

In 2021, the Airport Authority of India released a Rs. 987 crore tender for Phase 1 of airport project. The airport will have a 3,200 metre long runway suitable for 4E category aircraft. The airport is expected to cater to not only DSIR and its hinterland, but also to traffic overflow from the Ahmedabad international airport. The Gujarat government has allocated 1427 hectares of land for the said project and 75 hectares of government land, has been allocated for commercial development.
