= Gomia block =

Gomia
- Community development block
- Location in Jharkhand, India Gomia (India)
- Coordinates: 23°48′27″N 85°49′56″E
- Country: India
- State: Jharkhand
- District: Bokaro

Government
  - Type: Representative democracy

Area
  - Total: 650.70 km^{2} (251.24 sq mi)
- Elevation: 273 m (896 ft)

Population (2011)
  - Total: 231,185
  - Density: 355.29/km^{2} (920.19/sq mi)

Languages
  - Official: Hindi, Urdu

Literacy (2011)
  - Total literates: 128,206 (65.40%)
- Time zone: UTC+5:30 (IST)
- PIN: 829111 (Gomia); 829128 (Swang Colliery); 829116 (Kathara); 829112 (E.Gomia); 829134 (Sarubera)
- Telephone/STD code: 06544
- Vehicle registration: JH 09
- Lok Sabha constituency: Giridih
- Vidhan Sabha constituency: Gomia
- Website: bokaro.nic.in

Gomia (also spelled Gumia) is a community development block that forms an administrative division in the Bermo subdivision of the Bokaro district, Jharkhand state, India.

== Overview ==
Bokaro district, a part of the Chota Nagpur Plateau, has undulating surface with the altitude varying between 200 and 282 m. Topographically, the entire area is divided into three parts – the Bokaro uplands in the west, the Bokaro-Chas uplands in the middle and Barakar basin in the east. The general slope of the region is from the west to the east. The main rivers are the Damodar, Garga, Parga, Konar and Gobei. The district, covered with hills and forests, is a mining-industrial area. With the construction of the gigantic Bokaro Steel Plant in the nineteen sixties, it has become the focal point of this district.

== Maoist activities ==
Jharkhand is one of the states affected by Maoist activities. As of 2012, Bokaro was one of the 14 highly affected districts in the state. As of 2016, Bokaro was identified as one of the 13 focus areas by the state police to check Maoist activities.

== Geography ==
Gomia is located at 23°48′27″N 85°49′56″E.

Gomia CD block is bounded by Bishnugarh and Tati Jhariya CD blocks, in Hazaribagh district, on the north, Bermo and Petarwar CD blocks on the east, Gola, Chitarpur and Ramgarh CD blocks, in Ramgarh district on the south and Mandu CD block, in Ramgarh district, on the west.

Gomia CD block has an area of 650.70 km^{2}. It has 36 gram panchayats, 135 villages and 5 census towns. Gomia and Mahuatand police stations are located in this CD block. Headquarters of this CD block is at Gomia.

== Demographics ==
=== Population ===
According to the 2011 Census of India, Gumia CD block had a total population of 231,185, of which 130,898 were rural and 100,287 were urban. There were 118,918 (51%) males and 112,267 (49%) females. Population in the age range 0-6 years was 35,144. Scheduled Castes numbered 28,774 (12.45%) and Scheduled Tribes numbered 46,327 (20.04%).

Gomia CD block has several census towns (2011 population figure in brackets): Gomia (48,145), Hasir (11,195), Lalpania (3,659), Saram (15,212) and Tenudam-cum-Kathara (22,080).

Large villages (with 4,000+ population) in Gomia CD block are (2011 census figures in brackets): Hurlung (4,028), Barkipunu (6,986) and Kodwatanr alias Bhitugarha (6,283).

=== Literacy ===
As of 2011 census the total number of literate persons in Gumia CD block was 128,206 (65.40% of the population over 6 years) out of which males numbered 77,211 (76.62% of the male population over 6 years) and females numbered 50,995 (53.53% of the female population over 6 years). The gender disparity (the difference between female and male literacy rates) was 23.09%.

As of 2011 census, literacy in Bokaro district was 73.48% , Literacy in Jharkhand was 66.41% in 2011. Literacy in India in 2011 was 74.04%.

See also – List of Jharkhand districts ranked by literacy rate

Literacy in CD Blocks of
Bokaro district
Bermo subdivision
Nawadih – 62.55%
Chandrapura – 75.41%
Bermo – 79.04%
Gomia – 65.40%
Petarwar – 62.33%
Kasmar – 65.33%
Jaridih – 68.94%
Chas subdivision
Chas – 77.14%
Chandankiyari – 63.65%
Source: 2011 Census: CD Block Wise
Primary Census Abstract Data

=== Language ===
Hindi is the official language in Jharkhand and Urdu has been declared as an additional official language. Jharkhand legislature had passed a bill according the status of a second official language to several languages in 2011 but the same was turned down by the Governor.

In the 2001 census, the three most populous mother tongues (spoken language/ medium of communication between a mother and her children) in Bokaro district were (with percentage of total population in brackets): Khortha (41.08%), Hindi (17.05%) and Santali (10.78%). In the 2011 census, scheduled tribes constituted 12.40% of the total population of the district. The five most populous mother tongues were (with percentage of ST population in brackets): Santali (70.12%), Munda (17.05%), Oraon (5.90%), Karmali (4.23%) and Mahli (3.23%).

== Economy ==
=== Livelihood ===
Livelihood
in Gomia CD block
1. Cultivators (33.9%)
2. Agricultural labourers (16.9%)
3. Household industries (3.21%)
4. Other Workers (46.1%)

In Gomia CD block in 2011, amongst the class of total workers, cultivators numbered 28,912 and formed 33.85%, agricultural labourers numbered 14,397 and formed 16.86%, household industry workers numbered 2,743 and formed 3.21% and other workers numbered 39,355 and formed 46.08%. Total workers numbered 85,407 and formed 36.94% of the total population, and non-workers numbered 145,778 and formed 63.06% of the population.

Note: In the census records a person is considered a cultivator, if the person is engaged in cultivation/ supervision of land owned. When a person who works on another person's land for wages in cash or kind or share, is regarded as an agricultural labourer. Household industry is defined as an industry conducted by one or more members of the family within the household or village, and one that does not qualify for registration as a factory under the Factories Act. Other workers are persons engaged in some economic activity other than cultivators, agricultural labourers and household workers. It includes factory, mining, plantation, transport and office workers, those engaged in business and commerce, teachers, entertainment artistes and so on.

=== Infrastructure ===
There are 107 inhabited villages in Gomia CD block. In 2011, 48 villages had power supply. 9 villages had tap water (treated/ untreated), 106 villages had well water (covered/ uncovered), 96 villages had hand pumps, and all villages had drinking water facility. 14 villages had post offices, 13 villages had sub post offices, 6 village had telephone (land line) and 49 villages had mobile phone coverage. 106 villages had pucca (hard top) village roads, 20 villages had bus service (public/ private), 5 villages had autos/ modified autos, and 41 villages had tractors. 9 villages had banks branches, 5 villages had agricultural credit societies, no village had cinema/ video hall, no village had public library and public reading room. 37 villages had public distribution system, 27 villages had weekly haat (market) and 40 villages had assembly polling stations.

=== Explosives ===
Indian Explosives Ltd. set up a plant at Gomia in 1954.

=== Coal mining ===
Kathara Area of Central Coalfields Limited operates the following collieries of East Bokaro Coalfield: Kathara OC, Jarangdih OC, Jarangdih UG, Swang OC, Swang UG and Govindpur UG.

CCL operates coking coal washeries at Kathara and Swang.

=== Power ===
Tenughat Thermal Power Station is located at Lalpania and is owned by the state-owned Tenughat Vidyut Nigam Ltd. It operates a 2x210 MW power plant.

=== Agriculture ===
The average annual rainfall in Bokaro district is 1291.2 mm. The soil is generally laterite and sandy. 39.21% of the total area is under agriculture. It is generally a single monsoon-dependent crop. 9.90% of the cultivable land is under horticulture. Rice and maize are the main crops. Bajara, wheat, pulses and vegetables are also grown.

=== Backward Regions Grant Fund ===
Bokaro district is listed as a backward region and receives financial support from the Backward Regions Grant Fund. The fund created by the Government of India is designed to redress regional imbalances in development. As of 2012, 272 districts across the country were listed under this scheme. The list includes 21 districts of Jharkhand.

== Transport ==
The Gomoh-Barkakhana line serves Gomia block.

== Education ==
In 2011, amongst the 107 inhabited villages in Gomia CD block, 13 villages had no primary school, 68 villages had one primary school and 26 villages had more than one primary school. 50 villages had at least one primary school and one middle school. 16 villages had at least one middle school and one secondary school. Gomia CD block had 4 senior secondary schools and 2 degree colleges.

Jhabbu Singh Memorial College was established at Phusro in 1980. It is affiliated to Vinoba Bhave University and offers courses in arts and science.

Degree College Bokaro Thermal (details not available).

A degree college is planned on the Gomia-Peterwar main road.

Pitts Modern School

== Healthcare ==
In 2011, amongst the 107 inhabited villages in Gomia CD block, 1 village had primary health centre, 17 villages had primary health sub-centres, 7 villages had maternity and child welfare centres, 3 villages had TB clinics, 5 villages had allopathic hospitals, 4 villages had alternative medicine hospitals, 8 villages had dispensaries, 3 villages had veterinary hospitals, 18 villages had medicine shops and 64 villages had no medical facilities.
