= Saram, Bokaro =

Saram
- Census Town
- Location in Jharkhand, India#India3 Saram (India)
- Coordinates: 23.7646°N 85.8182°E
- Country: India
- State: Jharkhand
- District: Bokaro

Area
  - Total: 10.87 km^{2} (4.20 sq mi)

Population (2011)
  - Total: 15,212
  - Density: 1,399/km^{2} (3,625/sq mi)

Languages
  - Official: Hindi, Urdu
- Time zone: UTC+5:30 (IST)
- PIN: 829111
- Telephone/STD code: 06544
- Vehicle registration: JH 09
- Lok Sabha constituency: Giridih
- Vidhan Sabha constituency: Gomia
- Website: bokaro.nic.in

Saram is a census town in the Gomia CD block in the Bermo subdivision of the Bokaro district in the Indian state of Jharkhand.

== Geography ==
Cities, towns and locations in Bokaro district in North Chotanagpur Division
M: municipal town, CT: census town, R: rural/ urban centre, F: Factory, A: Coal Mining Area
Abbreviation used: TPS – Thermal Power Station
Owing to space constraints in the small map, the actual locations in a larger map may vary slightly

=== Location ===
Saram is located at 23.7646°N 85.8182°E.

=== Area overview ===
Bokaro district consists of undulating uplands on the Chota Nagpur Plateau with the Damodar River cutting a valley right across. It has an average elevation of 200 to 540 metres (660 to 1,770 ft) above mean sea level. The highest hill, Lugu Pahar, rises to a height of 1,070 metres (3,510 ft). The East Bokaro Coalfield located in the Bermo-Phusro area and small intrusions of Jharia Coalfield make Bokaro a coal rich district. In 1965, one of the largest steel manufacturing units in the country, Bokaro Steel Plant, operated by Steel Authority of India Limited, was set-up at Bokaro Steel City. The Damodar Valley Corporation established its first thermal power station at Bokaro (Thermal). The 5 kilometres (3.1 mi) long, 55 metres (180 ft) high earthfill dam with composite masonry cum concrete spillway, Tenughat Dam, across the Damodar River, is operated by the Government of Jharkhand. The average annual rainfall is 1,291.2 millimetres (50.83 in). The soil is generally infertile and agriculture is mostly rain-fed.

Note: The map alongside presents some of the notable locations in the district. All places marked in the map are linked in the larger full screen map.

== Demographics ==
According to the 2011 Census of India, Saram had a total population of 15,212, of which 7,959 (52%) were males and 7,253 (48%) were females. Population in the age range 0–6 years was 2,259. The total number of literate persons in Saram was 9,541 (73.66% of the population over 6 years).

== Infrastructure ==
According to the District Census Handbook 2011, Bokaro, Saram covered an area of 10.87 km^{2}. Among the civic amenities, it had 23 km roads with open drains, the protected water supply involved tapwater from treated sources, hand pump, overhead tank. It had 2,421 domestic electric connections. Among the medical facilities, it had 1 hospital, 1 dispensary, 6 health centres, 6 family welfare centres, 8 maternity and child welfare centres, 8 maternity homes, 9 nursing homes, 1 medicine shop. Among the educational facilities it had 1 primary school, 1 middle school, the nearest secondary school, senior secondary school at Hasir 0.5 km away. The nearest general degree college at Teughat 5 km away. It had 2 non-formal educational centres (Sarva Siksha Abhiyan). It had the branch office of 1 nationalised bank.
