= Chandrapura =

- Census Town
- Location in Jharkhand, India Chandrapura (India)
- Coordinates: 23.75°N 86.12°E
- Country: India
- State: Jharkhand
- District: Bokaro

Area
  - Total: 7.6 km^{2} (2.9 sq mi)

Population (2011)
  - Total: 27,425
  - Density: 3,600/km^{2} (9,300/sq mi)

Languages
  - Official: Hindi, Urdu
- Time zone: UTC+5:30 (IST)
- PIN: 828403
- Telephone code: 06549
- Vehicle registration: JH
- Lok Sabha constituency: Giridih
- Vidhan Sabha constituency: Bermo
- Website: bokaro.nic.in
- Industrial township of Chandrapura Thermal Power Station (C.T.P.S) under Damodar Valley Corporation

Chandrapura is a census town in the Chandrapura CD block in the Bermo subdivision of the Bokaro district in the Indian state of Jharkhand. It is situated on the northern banks of the river Damodar. The town is well known for the Chandrapura Thermal Power Station, a thermal-coal based power generation unit of Damodar Valley Corporation (DVC) and De Nobili school which was established by Roberto de Nobili. The school is one of 16 schools supported by Damodar Valley Corporation, an Indian state-owned corporation.

== Chandrapura Thermal Power Station ==
The Chandrapura Thermal Power Station has an installed power generation capacity of 500 MW.The power station earlier consisted of 3 units of 140 MW each, constructed by General Electric (GE), now completely dismantled. At present only two units of 250 MW each, constructed by Bharat Heavy Electricals Limited (BHEL) are in working. The two new units were installed as a part of the expansion program of DVC's Power Project. BHEL had been contracted for the construction and installation of the new units. The units have been installed and have commenced production from late 2011.

Their power station is one of the largest pulverized fuel fire power stations of Asia, and their Unit Number I was the first reheated unit installed in India. The town also has the Electrical switchyard of CTPS of DVC, being India’s biggest network. Additionally, the chimney of newly constructed thermal power unit has the highest standing tower in India and 4th highest in Asia within its township area. The power plant also provides employment in the surrounding regions.

The power plant was a major source of pollution for the adjoining areas owing to the coal-based generators, but things changed after electrostatic precipitators were installed in the chimneys, and large-scale afforestation was carried out, which lowered the pollution levels significantly.

== Geography ==
Cities, towns and locations in Bokaro district in North Chotanagpur Division
M: municipal town, CT: census town, R: rural/ urban centre, F: Factory, A: Coal Mining Area
Abbreviation used: TPS – Thermal Power Station
Owing to space constraints in the small map, the actual locations in a larger map may vary slightly

=== Location ===
Chandrapura is roughly situated near the East-Central part of Jharkhand at 23.75°N 86.12°E and has an average elevation of 222 m (728 ft).

The town is surrounded by a group of hillocks on the North-West, West and the South. On the North, it is surrounded by the small adjoining villages of Ghatiyari, Pipradih, Narra and Taranari. The town is well connected by road and rail. Chandrapura railway station, being one of the biggest railway intersections in the nation, has five routes which provide efficient transportation all throughout India.

=== Area overview ===
Bokaro district consists of undulating uplands on the Chota Nagpur Plateau with the Damodar River cutting a valley right across. It has an average elevation of 200 to 540 metres (660 to 1,770 ft) above mean sea level. The highest hill, Lugu Pahar, rises to a height of 1,070 metres (3,510 ft). The East Bokaro Coalfield located in the Bermo-Phusro area and small intrusions of Jharia Coalfield make Bokaro a coal rich district. In 1965, one of the largest steel manufacturing units in the country, Bokaro Steel Plant, operated by Steel Authority of India Limited, was set up at Bokaro Steel City. The Damodar Valley Corporation established its first thermal power station at Bokaro (Thermal). The 5 kilometres (3.1 mi) long, 55 metres (180 ft) high earthfill dam with composite masonry cum concrete spillway, Tenughat Dam, across the Damodar River, is operated by the Government of Jharkhand. The average annual rainfall is 1,291.2 millimetres (50.83 in). The soil is generally infertile and agriculture is mostly rain-fed.

Note: The map alongside presents some of the notable locations in the district. All places marked in the map are linked in the larger full screen map.

== Civic administration ==
=== Police station ===
Chandrapura police station is located near DVC hospital.

=== CD Bbock HQ ===
The headquarters of Chandrapura CD block are located at Dugda road.

== Demographics ==
According to the 2011 Census of India, Chandrapura had a total population of 27,425, of which 14,428 (52%) were males and 12,997 (47%) were females. Population in the age range 0–6 years was 3,364. The total number of literate persons in Chandrapura was 19,726 (81.98% of the population over 6 years).

As of the 2001 India census, Chandrapura had a population of 22,389. Males constitute 54% of the population and females 46%. Chandrapura had an average literacy rate of 71%, higher than the national average of 59.5%; with male literacy of 78% and female literacy of 62%. 13% of the population was under 6 years of age.

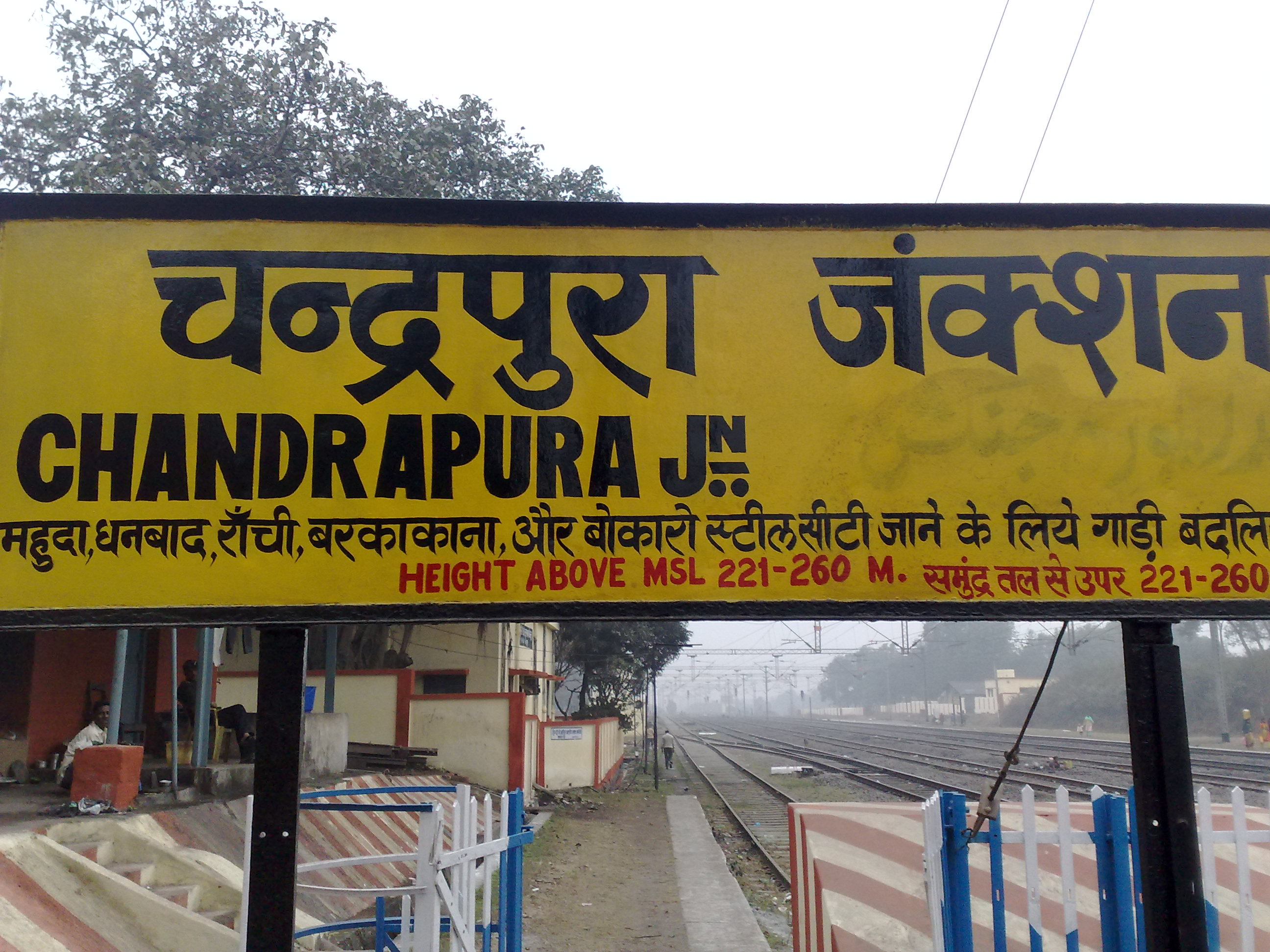
Chandrapura Railway Station

== Infrastructure ==
According to the District Census Handbook 2011, Bokaro, Chandrapura covered an area of 7.6 km^{2}. Among the civic amenities, it had 11 km roads with both open and closed drains, the protected water supply involved tapwater from treated sources, hand pumps, service reservoir. It had 5,112 domestic electric connections, 90 road lighting points. Among the medical facilities, it had 5 hospitals, 4 dispensaries, 4 health centres, 9 family welfare centres, 1 maternity and child welfare centres, 1 maternity homes, 1 nursing home, 12 medicine shops. Among the educational facilities it had 4 primary schools, 2 middle school, 2 secondary school, 3 secondary school, 1 general degree college. It had 1 non-formal educational centre (Sarva Siksha Abhiyan). Among the social, recreational and cultural facilities it had 1 stadium, 1 cinema theatre, 4 auditorium/ community halls, 1 public library, 1 reading room. An important commodity it produced was electricity. It had the branch offices of 1 nationalised bank, 1 non-agricultural credit society.

== Education ==
Educational institutions in the area include the De Nobili School, Chandrapura, which is affiliated to the I.C.S.E. The Kendriya Vidyalaya, (affiliated to the C.B.S.E) and two separate schools funded by the D.V.C (D.V.C. Middle School and the D.V.C. High School, for middle school and high school students respectively) are also in the area. Schools and coaching centres in the neighbouring cities of Dugda, Bhandaridah and Bokaro Steel City also serve the purpose of providing education to students. The Blossom School also provides primary education. The D.V.C. Inter College - a government college funded by D.V.C., provides higher education.
