= Bermo subdivision =

- Subdivision
- Location in Jharkhand, India Bermo subdivision (India)
- Coordinates: 23°47′N 85°57′E
- Country: India
- State: Jharkhand
- District: Bokaro
- Headquarters: Tenughat

Population
  - Total: 1,018,690

Languages
  - Official: Hindi, Urdu
- Time zone: UTC+5:30 (IST)
- Website: bokaro.nic.in

Bermo subdivision is an administrative subdivision of the Bokaro district in the North Chotanagpur division in the state of Jharkhand, India.

== History ==
Bokaro district was created on 1 April 1991 by taking out Chas and Chandankiyari CD blocks of Dhanbad district and the entire Bermo subdivision of Giridih district and merging them. Earlier, in 1972, Giridih district, including Bermo subdivision, was carved out of Hazaribagh district.

== Administrative set up ==
Bokaro district has two subdivisions:

Subdivision	Headquarters	Area km^{2}	Population (2011)	Rural population % (2011)	Urban population % (2011)
Bermo	Tenughat	n/a	1,018,690	59.98	40.02
Chas	Chas	n/a	1,043,640	44.81	55.19
Bokaro district	Bokaro Steel City	2,883	2,062,330	52.30	47.70

Cities, towns and locations in Bokaro district in North Chotanagpur Division
M: municipal town, CT: census town, R: rural/ urban centre, F: Factory, A: Coal Mining Area
Abbreviation used: TPS – Thermal Power Station
Owing to space constraints in the small map, the actual locations in a larger map may vary slightly

=== Urban frame ===
Phusro is the only statutory town in Bermo subdivision. It has 21 census towns: Bhandra, Telo, Narra, Chandrapura, Bursera, Dugda, Sijhua, Termi, Bermo, Kurpania, Bokaro (Thermal), Gomia, Saram, Hasir, Jaridih Bazar, Tenudam-cum-Kathara, Tenu, Lalpania, Jena, Bandh Dih and Tanr Balidih.

The percentage of the population living in the urban areas is very high in Bermo CD block at 97.78%, and it is reasonably high in Chandrapura CD block at 63.09% and in Gomia CD block at 43.38%.

=== Rural frame ===
There are 363 inhabited villages in Bermo subdivision.

== Police stations ==
Police stations in Bermo subdivision were at:

1. Bermo
2. Chandrapura
3. Dugda
4. Gomia
5. IEL
6. Jaridih
7. Kasmar
8. Mahuatand
9. Nawadih
10. Petarwar
11. Pindrajora

== Blocks ==
Community development blocks in Bermo subdivision are

CD block	Headquarters	Area km^{2}	Population (2011)	SC %	ST %	Literacy rate %	Census Towns
Nawadih	Nawadih	318.03	138,454	13.34	12.53	52.51	Bhandra
Chandrapura	Chandrapura	121.08	132,162	11.29	8.52	65.08	Telo, Narra, Chandrapura, Termi, Bursera, Sijua, Dugda
Bermo	Bermo	57.74	100,599	14.61	6.50	69.13	Bokaro (Thermal), Kurpania, Bermo, Jaridih Bazar
Gomia	Gomia	670.49	23,118	12.45	20.24	55.46	Gomia, Hasir, Lalpania, Saram, Tenudam-cum-Kathara
Petarwar	Petarwar	305.64	132150	14.85	29.09	52.93	Tenughat
Kasmar	Kasmar	195.26	89,974	10.91	15.05	55.98	-
Jaridih	Bandhdih	207.52	104,988	10.72	30.67	58.80	Bandh Dih, Jena, Tanr Balidih

== Economy ==
=== Collieries ===
Projects of the Central Coalfields in Bermo subdivision are given below:

Operational Area	Collieries
Bokaro and Kargali Area	Bokaro open cast, Kargali open cast, Kargali underground, Karo opencast, Karo underground, Khas Mahal opencast, Khas Mahal underground, Karo Special underground, Giridih opencast*, Kabribad opencast*, Kargali washery. The area office is at Kargali, PO Bermo 829104
Dhori Area	Amlo opencast, Dhori open cast, Selected Dhori Quarry No. I open cast, Selected Dhori Quarry No. III open cast, New Selected Dhori underground, Dhori Khas underground. The area office is at Dhori, PO Dhori 825102.
Kathara Area	Kathara open cast, Jarangdih opencast, Jarangdih underground, Sawang opencast/ underground, Govindpur underground, Kathara Washery, Swang Washery. The area office is at Kathara, PO Kathara 829116.

.*Located outside the subdivision

Damoda colliery in the Barora Area of BCCL is in Bermo subdivision.

Dugda Coal Washery of BCCL at Dugda has two units: Dugda I with annual capacity of 1 million tonnes per year washes non-coking coal, Dugda II with annual capacity of 2 million tonnes per year washes coking coal.

=== Tenughat Dam ===
The four main multipurpose dams of the Damodar Valley Corporation, located at Tilaiya, Konar, Maithon and Panchet were commissioned during 1953–1959. In addition, a single purpose reservoir on the main stream, the Damodar, at Tenughat (with live storage 224 million m^{3} and without provision for flood storage) was constructed later in 1974. While the four earlier dams are controlled by Damodar Valley Corporation, Tenughat Dam is controlled by the Government of Jharkhand.

=== Thermal Power Plants ===
Bokaro (Thermal) has two power plants:

- BTPS 'A' was started in 1952 and closed down on 17 July 2000 for violating pollution norms. A new efficient 500MW has been set up in May 2016.
- BTPS 'B' has an installed capacity of 630 MW. The first unit was commissioned in March 1986. The station is located on the banks of the Konar River near Bokaro ‘A’ Thermal Power Station.

Chandrapura Thermal Power Station is a thermal power plant located in Chandrapura, operated by the Damodar Valley Corporation. It has 3 units with a total installed capacity of 630 MW. All of the units are coal-based.

Tenughat Thermal Power Station is a coal-based thermal power plant located at Lalpania, owned by Jharkhand State owned Tenughat Vidyut Nigam Limited, with an installed capacity of 420 MW (2x210 MW).

=== Explosives ===
Indian Explosives Ltd. set up a plant at Gomia in 1954.

== Education ==
In 2011, in Bermo subdivision out of a total 363 inhabited villages there were 63 villages with pre-primary schools, 340 villages with primary schools, 193 villages with middle schools, 51 villages with secondary schools, 23 villages with senior secondary schools, 6 locations with general degree colleges, 2 locations with non-formal training centres, 3 locations with vocational training institutes, 1 polytechnic, 20 villages with no educational facility.
.*Senior secondary schools are also known as Inter colleges in Jharkhand

=== Educational institutions ===
The following institutions are located in Bermo subdivision:

- Krishna Ballav Mahavidyalaya, established in 1964, at Bermo.
- Jhabbu Singh Memorial College, established in 1980, at Phusro.

(Information about degree colleges with proper reference may be added here)

== Healthcare ==
In 2011, in Bermo subdivision there were 16 villages with primary health centres, 69 villages with primary health subcentres, 17 villages with maternity and child welfare centres, 11 villages with allopathic hospitals, 20 villages with dispensaries, 5 villages with veterinary hospitals, 11 villages with family welfare centres, 38 villages with medicine shops.
.*Private medical practitioners, alternative medicine etc. not included

=== Medical facilities ===
(Anybody having referenced information about location of government/ private medical facilities may please add it here)
