= Achhaiya (village) =

Coordinates: 23.641°N 85.850°E

Achhaiya is a small electrified village located in Petarwar Block, Bokaro District, India.

== Location ==
Achhaiya is 2 kilometres (1.2 mi) from the national highway (National Highway 7 (India, old numbering)), and is an hour's drive from the state capital, Ranchi. Surrounding villages include Banga, Sadma, Ordana, and Osam.

== History ==
The word Achhaiya is derived from the Sanskrit word akchhat, meaning "raw rice". Achhaiya came into existence in 1773 when Babu Atma Roy was given Mouza Achhaiya under the Zamindari system from the Ramgarh Raj. Babu Laxmi Roy was the last Zamindar of Mouza Achhaiya.

== Festivals ==
Achhaiya is known for the Vasant Kalin Durga Puja, celebrated in the months of March and April by the Roy family.
