= Bermo block =

Bermo
- Community development block
- Location in Jharkhand, India Bermo (India)
- Coordinates: 23°46′49″N 85°57′41″E
- Country: India
- State: Jharkhand
- District: Bokaro

Government
  - Type: Representative democracy

Area
  - Total: 100.32 km^{2} (38.73 sq mi)
- Elevation: 214 m (702 ft)

Population (2011)
  - Total: 100,599
  - Density: 1,002.8/km^{2} (2,597.2/sq mi)

Languages
  - Official: Hindi, Urdu

Literacy (2011)
  - Total literates: 69,543 (79.04%)
- Time zone: UTC+5:30 (IST)
- PIN: 829104 (Bermo)
- Telephone/STD code: 06549
- Vehicle registration: JH 09
- Lok Sabha constituency: Giridih
- Vidhan Sabha constituency: Bermo
- Website: bokaro.nic.in

Bermo is a community development block that forms an administrative division in the Bermo subdivision of the Bokaro district, Jharkhand state, India.

== Overview ==
Bokaro district, a part of the Chota Nagpur Plateau, has undulating surface with the altitude varying between 200 and 282 m. Topographically, the entire area is divided into three parts – the Bokaro uplands in the west, the Bokaro-Chas uplands in the middle and Barakar basin in the east. The general slope of the region is from the west to the east. The main rivers are the Damodar, Garga, Parga, Konar and Gobei. The district, covered with hills and forests, is a mining-industrial area. With the construction of the gigantic Bokaro Steel Plant in the nineteen sixties, it has become the focal point of this district.

== Maoist activities ==
Jharkhand is one of the states affected by Maoist activities. As of 2012, Bokaro was one of the 14 highly affected districts in the state.As of 2016, Bokaro was identified as one of the 13 focus areas by the state police to check Maoist activities.

== Geography ==
Bermo is located at 23°46′49″N 85°57′41″E.

Bermo CD block is bounded by Nawadih CD block on the north, Chandrapura CD block on the east, Petarwar and Gomia CD blocks on the south and Bishnugarh CD block, in Hazaribagh district, on the west.

Bermo CD block has an area of 100.32 km^{2}. It has 19 gram panchayats, 16 villages and 4 census towns. Bermo, Gandhinagar, and BTPS police stations are located in this CD block. Headquarters of this CD block is at Bermo.

Konar River passes Gomia to receive the waters of the Bokaro River, shortly before it joins the Damodar River near Jaridih Bazar in Bokaro district.

== Demographics ==
=== Population ===
According to the 2011 Census of India, Bermo CD block had a total population of 100,599, of which 4,222 were rural and 96,377 were urban. There were 52,481 (52%) males and 48,118 (48%) females. Population in the age range 0–6 years was 12,616. Scheduled Castes numbered 14,963 (14.87%) and Scheduled Tribes numbered 6,538 (6.50%).

Bermo CD block has several census towns (2011 population figure in brackets): Bokaro (39,305), Kurpania (7,789), Bermo (17,401) and Jaridih Bazar (31,882).Phusro Urban Agglomeration is composed of Phusro (Nagar Parishad), Bermo (Census Town), Jaridih Bazar (CT), Bokaro (CT) and Kurpania (CT).

=== Literacy ===
As of 2011 census the total number of literate persons in Bermo CD block was 69,543 (79.04% of the population over 6 years) out of which males numbered 39,976 (87.09% of the male population over 6 years) and females numbered 29,567 (70.27% of the female population over 6 years). The gender disparity (the difference between female and male literacy rates) was 16.82%.

As of 2011 census, literacy in Bokaro district was 73.48% , Literacy in Jharkhand was 66.41% in 2011. Literacy in India in 2011 was 74.04%.

See also – List of Jharkhand districts ranked by literacy rate

Literacy in CD Blocks of
Bokaro district
Bermo subdivision
Nawadih – 62.55%
Chandrapura – 75.41%
Bermo – 79.04%
Gomia – 65.40%
Petarwar – 62.33%
Kasmar – 65.33%
Jaridih – 68.94%
Chas subdivision
Chas – 77.14%
Chandankiyari – 63.65%
Source: 2011 Census: CD Block Wise
Primary Census Abstract Data

=== Language ===
Hindi is the official language in Jharkhand and Urdu has been declared as an additional official language. Jharkhand legislature had passed a bill according the status of a second official language to several languages in 2011 but the same was turned down by the Governor.

In the 2001 census, the three most populous mother tongues (spoken language/ medium of communication between a mother and her children) in Bokaro district were (with percentage of total population in brackets): Khortha (41.08%), Hindi (17.05%) and Santali (10.78%). In the 2011 census, scheduled tribes constituted 12.40% of the total population of the district. The five most populous mother tongues were (with percentage of ST population in brackets): Santali (70.12%), Munda (17.05%), Oraon (5.90%), Karmali (4.23%) and Mahli (3.23%).

== Economy ==
=== Livelihood ===
Livelihood
in Bermo CD block
1. Cultivators (3.41%)
2. Agricultural labourers (1.83%)
3. Household industries (1.91%)
4. Other Workers (92.8%)

In Bermo CD block in 2011, amongst the class of total workers, cultivators numbered 1,758 and formed 3.41%, agricultural labourers numbered 943 and formed 1.83%, household industry workers numbered 986 and formed 1.91% and other workers numbered 47,804 and formed 92.84%. Total workers numbered 51,491 and formed 27.13% of the total population, and non-workers numbered 138,286 and formed 72.87% of the population.

Note: In the census records a person is considered a cultivator, if the person is engaged in cultivation/ supervision of land owned. When a person who works on another person's land for wages in cash or kind or share, is regarded as an agricultural labourer. Household industry is defined as an industry conducted by one or more members of the family within the household or village, and one that does not qualify for registration as a factory under the Factories Act. Other workers are persons engaged in some economic activity other than cultivators, agricultural labourers and household workers. It includes factory, mining, plantation, transport and office workers, those engaged in business and commerce, teachers, entertainment artistes and so on.

=== Infrastructure ===
There are 3 inhabited villages in Bermo CD block. In 2011, all 3 villages had power supply, drinking water facility, pucca (hard top) village roads and 2 villages had assembly polling stations. All three villages had primary schools and 1 village had a middle school. 1 village had a primary health centre, an allopathic hospital and a dispensary.

=== Coal mining ===
Bokaro and Kargali Area of Central Coalfields Limited operates the following projects in East Bokaro Coalfield among others in Bokaro district: Bokaro open cast, Karagli OC, Kargali underground, Karo OC, Karo UG, Karo Spl. UG, Khas Mahal OC, Khas Mahal UG and Kargali Washery. Dhori Area of CCL operates: Amlo OC, Dhori OC, Selected Dhori Quarry No.I OC, Selected Dhori Quarry No. III OC, New Selected Dhori UG and Dhori Khas UG.

- See also: 1965 Dhanbad coal mine disaster

=== Power stations ===
Bokaro Thermal Power Station ‘A’ was the first thermal power station of DVC. It had three units of 45 MW each supplied by GE, USA in 1953, and one unit of 40 MW supplied by MAN, Germany in 1960. All the four were decommissioned in 2000. As of 2015, a new 500 MW unit is under construction.

Bokaro Thermal Power Station B of DVC has three units of 210 MW each. These came up in 1987, 1991 and 1994.

=== Agriculture ===
The average annual rainfall in Bokaro district is 1291.2 mm. The soil is generally laterite and sandy. 39.21% of the total area is under agriculture. It is generally a single monsoon-dependent crop. 9.90% of the cultivable land is under horticulture. Rice and maize are the main crops. Bajara, wheat, pulses and vegetables are also grown.

=== Backward Regions Grant Fund ===
Bokaro district is listed as a backward region and receives financial support from the Backward Regions Grant Fund. The fund created by the Government of India is designed to redress regional imbalances in development. As of 2012, 272 districts across the country were listed under this scheme. The list includes 21 districts of Jharkhand.

== Transport ==
The Gomoh-Barkakhana line serves Bermo block.
