= Tenudam-cum-Kathara =

Tenudam-cum-Kathhara
- Census Town
- Location in India Tenudam-cum-Kathhara (India)
- Coordinates: 23.7526°N 85.8442°E
- Country: India
- State: Jharkhand
- District: Bokaro

Area
  - Total: 20.17 km^{2} (7.79 sq mi)

Population (2011)
  - Total: 22,080
  - Density: 1,095/km^{2} (2,835/sq mi)

Languages
- Time zone: UTC+5:30 (IST)
- PIN: 829111
- Telephone/STD code: 06544
- Vehicle registration: JH 09
- Lok Sabha constituency: Giridih
- Vidhan Sabha constituency: Gomia
- Website: bokaro.nic.in

Tenudam-cum-Kathara is a census town in the Gomia CD block in the Bermo subdivision of the Bokaro district in the Indian state of Jharkhand.

== Geography ==
Cities, towns and locations in Bokaro district in North Chotanagpur Division
M: municipal town, CT: census town, R: rural/ urban centre, F: Factory, A: Coal Mining Area
Abbreviation used: TPS – Thermal Power Station
Owing to space constraints in the small map, the actual locations in a larger map may vary slightly

=== Location ===
Tenudam-cum-Kathara is located at 23.7526°N 85.8442°E.

Teundam-cum-Kathara is not marked in Google maps. The location given here is as per the Map of Gomia CD block on page 78 of District Census Handbook 2011, Bokaro.

=== Area overview ===
Bokaro district consists of undulating uplands on the Chota Nagpur Plateau with the Damodar River cutting a valley right across. It has an average elevation of 200 to 540 metres (660 to 1,770 ft) above mean sea level. The highest hill, Lugu Pahar, rises to a height of 1,070 metres (3,510 ft). The East Bokaro Coalfield located in the Bermo-Phusro area and small intrusions of Jharia Coalfield make Bokaro a coal rich district. In 1965, one of the largest steel manufacturing units in the country, Bokaro Steel Plant, operated by Steel Authority of India Limited, was set-up at Bokaro Steel City. The Damodar Valley Corporation established its first thermal power station at Bokaro (Thermal). The 5 kilometres (3.1 mi) long, 55 metres (180 ft) high earthfill dam with composite masonry cum concrete spillway, Tenughat Dam, across the Damodar River, is operated by the Government of Jharkhand. The average annual rainfall is 1,291.2 millimetres (50.83 in). The soil is generally infertile and agriculture is mostly rain-fed.

Note: The map alongside presents some of the notable locations in the district. All places marked in the map are linked in the larger full screen map.

== Tenughat Dam ==
Tenughat Dam, earthfill dam with masonry-cum-concret==e spillway, was constructed across the Damodar River and inaugurated in 1973. It was constructed by the Government of Bihar, outside the scope of Damodar Valley Corporation. It is 55 metres (180 ft) high and around 5 kilometres (3.1 mi) long. It supplies water to the Bokaro industrial area.

== Demographics ==
According to the 2011 Census of India, Tenudam-cum-Kathara had a total population of 22,080, of which 11,538 (52%) were males and 10,542 (48%) were females. Population in the age range 0–6 years was 3,160. The total number of literate persons in Tenudam-cum-Kathara was 13,798 (72.93% of the population over 6 years).

As of 2001 India census, Tenudam-cum- Kathara had a population of 20,443. Males constitute 53% of the population and females 47%. Tenu Dam-cum- Kathhara has an average literacy rate of 56%, lower than the national average of 59.5%: male literacy is 68%, and female literacy is 43%. In Tenu Dam-cum- Kathhara, 19% of the population is under 6 years of age.

== Infrastructure ==
According to the District Census Handbook 2011, Bokaro, Tenudam-cum-Kathara covered an area of 20.17 km^{2}. Among the civic amenities, it had 79 km roads with open drains, the protected water supply involved tapwater from treated sources, overhead tank. It had 3,636 domestic electric connections, 40 road lighting points. Among the medical facilities, it had 2 hospitals, 2 dispensaries, 2 health centres, 10 family welfare centres, 6 maternity and child welfare centres, 1 nursing home, 3 medicine shops. Among the educational facilities it had 21 primary schools, 10 middle schools, 7 secondary school, 2 senior secondary schools, 1 general degree college. It had 2 non-formal educational centres (Sarva Siksha Abhiyan). An important commodity it produced was coal. It had the branch office of 1 nationalised bank.

== Administration ==
Tenudam-cum Kathara is one of the 16 urban local bodies in Bokaro district. It has a town panchayat.

== Economy ==
Collieries in the CCL Kathara Area (East Bokaro Coalfield)
U: Underground colliery, O: Open Cast colliery, M: Mixed colliery, W: Washery, S: Facility, A: Administrative headquarters
Owing to space constraints in the small map, the actual locations in a larger map may vary slightly

Kathara Area of Central Coalfields Limited operates the following collieries in East Bokaro Coalfield: Kathara OC, Jarangdih OC, Jarangdih UG, Swang OC, Swang UG and Govindpur UG.

CCL operates coking coal washeries at Kathara and Swang.
