= Jaridih block =

Jaridih
- Community development block
- Location in Jharkhand, India Jaridih (India)
- Coordinates: 23°39′30″N 86°0′34″E
- Country: India
- State: Jharkhand
- District: Bokaro

Government
  - Type: Representative democracy

Area
  - Total: 212.83 km^{2} (82.17 sq mi)
- Elevation: 247 m (810 ft)

Population (2011)
  - Total: 104,988
  - Density: 493.30/km^{2} (1,277.6/sq mi)

Languages
  - Official: Hindi(Santali-language ), Urdu

Literacy (2011)
  - Total literates: 61,736 (68.94%)
- Time zone: UTC+5:30 (IST)
- PIN: 829301 (Jaina); 827014 (Balidih)
- Telephone/STD code: 06542
- Vehicle registration: JH 09
- Lok Sabha constituency: Giridih
- Vidhan Sabha constituency: Bermo
- Website: bokaro.nic.in

Jaridih is a community development block that forms an administrative division in the Bermo subdivision of the Bokaro district, Jharkhand state, India.

== Overview ==
Bokaro district, a part of the Chota Nagpur Plateau, has undulating surface with the altitude varying between 200 and 282 m. Topographically, the entire area is divided into three parts – the Bokaro uplands in the west, the Bokaro-Chas uplands in the middle and Barakar basin in the east. The general slope of the region is from the west to the east. The main rivers are the Damodar, Garga, Parga, Konar and Gobei. The district, covered with hills and forests, is a mining-industrial area. With the construction of the gigantic Bokaro Steel Plant in the nineteen sixties, it has become the focal point of this district.

== Maoist activities ==
Jharkhand is one of the states affected by Maoist activities. As of 2012, Bokaro was one of the 14 highly affected districts in the state.As of 2016, Bokaro was identified as one of the 13 focus areas by the state police to check Maoist activities.

== Geography ==
Bandhdih, a census town that is a constituent of the Jaridih CD block, is located at 23°39′30″N 86°0′34″E.

Jaridih CD block is bounded by Chandrapura CD block on the north, Chas CD block on the east, Joypur CD block, in Purulia district of West Bengal, on the south, and Kasmar and Petarbar CD blocks on the west.

Jaridih CD block has an area of 212.83 km^{2}. It has 17 gram panchayats, 42 villages and 3 census towns. Jaridih police station is located in this CD block. Headquarters of this CD block is at Bandhdih.

== Demographics ==
=== Population ===
According to the 2011 Census of India, Jaridih CD block had a total population of 104,988, of which 75,671 were rural and 29,317 were urban. There were 54,445 (52%) males and 50,543 (48%) females. Population in the age range 0-6 years was 15,342. Scheduled Castes numbered 11,250 (10.73%) and Scheduled Tribes numbered 32,202 (30.70%).

Jaridih CD block has three census towns (2011 population figure in brackets): Bandh Dih (13,192), Jena (8,143) and Tanr Balidih (7,982).

Large villages (with 4,000+ population) in Jaridih CD block are (2011 census figures in brackets): Khutri (4,761) and Tanr Mohanpur (4,554).

=== Literacy ===
As of 2011 census the total number of literate persons in Jaridih CD block was 61,736 (68.94% of the population over 6 years) out of which males numbered 37,268 (80.29% of the male population over 6 years) and females numbered 24,468 (56.60% of the female population over 6 years). The gender disparity (the difference between female and male literacy rates) was 23.69%.

As of 2011 census, literacy in Bokaro district was 73.48% , Literacy in Jharkhand was 66.41% in 2011. Literacy in India in 2011 was 74.04%.

See also – List of Jharkhand districts ranked by literacy rate

Literacy in CD Blocks of
Bokaro district
Bermo subdivision
Nawadih – 62.55%
Chandrapura – 75.41%
Bermo – 79.04%
Gomia – 65.40%
Petarwar – 62.33%
Kasmar – 65.33%
Jaridih – 68.94%
Chas subdivision
Chas – 77.14%
Chandankiyari – 63.65%
Source: 2011 Census: CD Block Wise
Primary Census Abstract Data

=== Language ===
Hindi is the official language in Jharkhand and Urdu has been declared as an additional official language. Jharkhand legislature had passed a bill according the status of a second official language to several languages in 2011 but the same was turned down by the Governor.

In the 2001 census, the three most populous mother tongues (spoken language/ medium of communication between a mother and her children) in Bokaro district were (with percentage of total population in brackets): Khortha (41.08%), Hindi (17.05%) and Santali (10.78%). In the 2011 census, scheduled tribes constituted 12.40% of the total population of the district. The five most populous mother tongues were (with percentage of ST population in brackets): Santali (70.12%), Munda (17.05%), Oraon (5.90%), Karmali (4.23%) and Mahli (3.23%).

== Economy ==
=== Livelihood ===
Livelihood
in Jaridih CD block
1. Cultivators (23.5%)
2. Agricultural labourers (19.6%)
3. Household industries (4.16%)
4. Other Workers (52.7%)

In Jaridih CD block in 2011, amongst the class of total workers, cultivators numbered 9,036 and formed 23.54%, agricultural labourers numbered 7,511 and formed 19.57%, household industry workers numbered 1,597 and formed 4.16% and other workers numbered 20,241 and formed 52.73%. Total workers numbered 38,385 and formed 36.56% of the total population, and non-workers numbered 66,603 and formed 63.44% of the population.

Note: In the census records a person is considered a cultivator, if the person is engaged in cultivation/ supervision of land owned. When a person who works on another person's land for wages in cash or kind or share, is regarded as an agricultural labourer. Household industry is defined as an industry conducted by one or more members of the family within the household or village, and one that does not qualify for registration as a factory under the Factories Act. Other workers are persons engaged in some economic activity other than cultivators, agricultural labourers and household workers. It includes factory, mining, plantation, transport and office workers, those engaged in business and commerce, teachers, entertainment artistes and so on.

=== Infrastructure ===
There are 38 inhabited villages in Jaridih CD block. In 2011, 19 villages had power supply. 4 villages had tap water (treated/ untreated), 38 villages had well water (covered/ uncovered), 38 villages had hand pumps, and all villages had drinking water facility. 8 villages had post offices, 9 villages had sub post offices, 6 village had telephone (land line) and 30 villages had mobile phone coverage. 38 villages had pucca (hard top) village roads, 11 villages had bus service (public/ private), 8 villages had autos/ modified autos, and 17 villages had tractors. 4 villages had banks branches, 1 village had an agricultural credit society, 1 village had cinema/ video hall, no village had public library and public reading room. 18 villages had public distribution system, 11 villages had weekly haat (market) and 20 villages had assembly polling stations.

=== Agriculture ===
The average annual rainfall in Bokaro district is 1291.2 mm. The soil is generally laterite and sandy. 39.21% of the total area is under agriculture. It is generally a single monsoon-dependent crop. 9.90% of the cultivable land is under horticulture. Rice and maize are the main crops. Bajara, wheat, pulses and vegetables are also grown.

=== Backward Regions Grant Fund ===
Bokaro district is listed as a backward region and receives financial support from the Backward Regions Grant Fund. The fund created by the Government of India is designed to redress regional imbalances in development. As of 2012, 272 districts across the country were listed under this scheme. The list includes 21 districts of Jharkhand.

== Education ==
In 2011, amongst the 38 inhabited villages in Jaridih CD block, 3 villages had no primary school, 27 villages had one primary school and 8 villages had more than one primary school. 13 villages had at least one primary school and one middle school. 5 villages had at least one middle school and one secondary school. Jaridih CD block had 1 senior secondary school.

NJS College, Jaina More, Bandh Dih

== Healthcare ==
In 2011, amongst the 38 inhabited villages in Jaridih CD block, 1 village had primary health centre, 4 villages had primary health sub-centres,1 village had an allopathic hospital, 1 village had an dispensary and 32 villages had no medical facilities.
