= Nawadih =

- Village
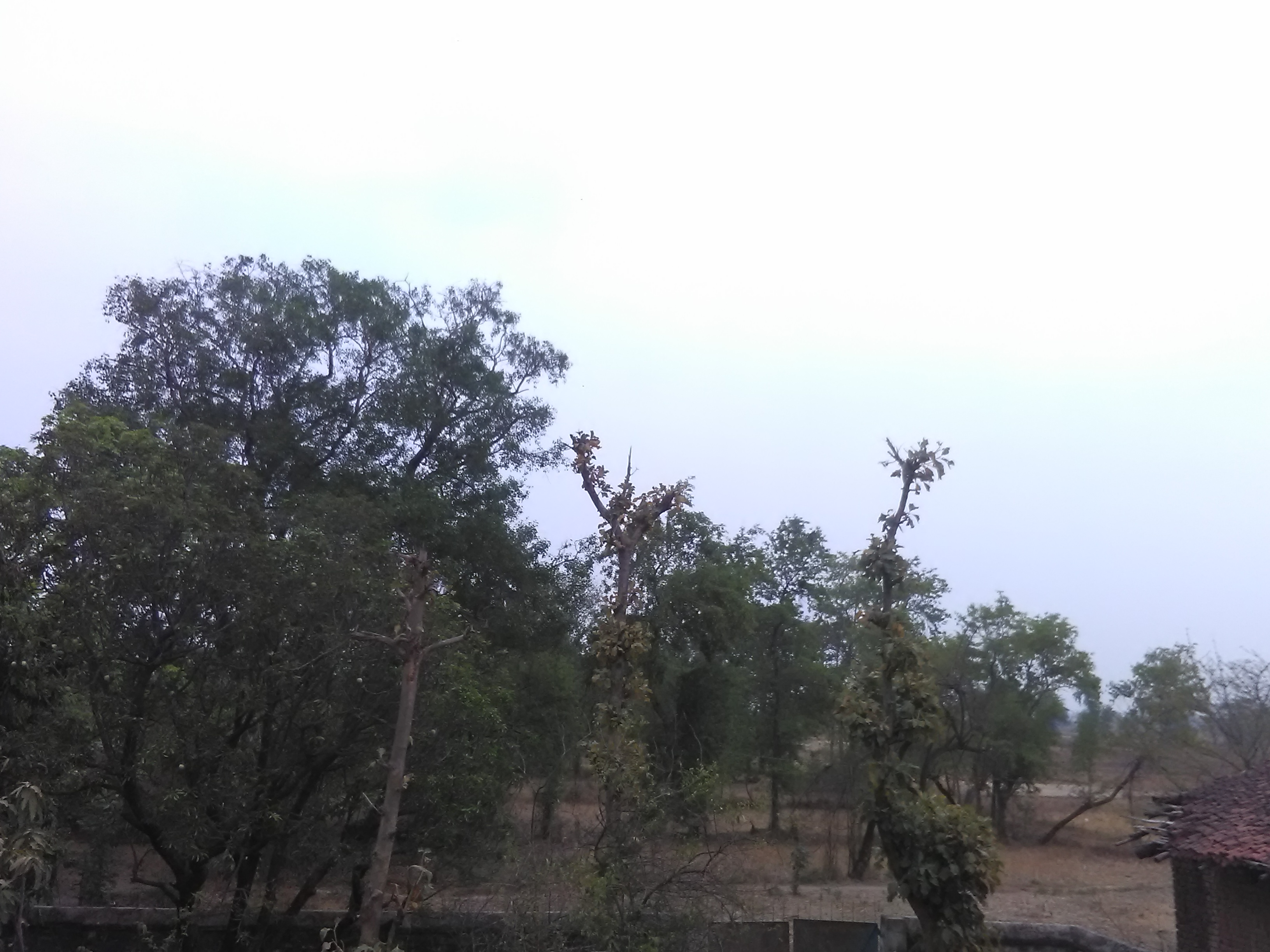

- Location in Jharkhand, India Nawadih (India)
- Coordinates: 23.858889°N 86.044722°E
- Country: India
- State: Jharkhand
- District: Bokaro

Population (2011)
  - Total: 4,362

Languages
  - Official: Hindi, Urdu
- Time zone: UTC+5:30 (IST)
- PIN: 829144
- Telephone/STD code: 06549
- Vehicle registration: JH
- Lok Sabha constituency: Giridih
- Vidhan Sabha constituency: Dumri
- Website: bokaro.nic.in

Nawadih is a village in the Nawadih CD block in the Bermo subdivision of the Bokaro district in the Indian state of Jharkhand.

== Geography ==
=== Location ===
Nawadih is located at 23.858889°N 86.044722°E

Cities, towns and locations in Bokaro district in North Chotanagpur Division
M: municipal town, CT: census town, R: rural/ urban centre, F: Factory, A: Coal Mining Area
Abbreviation used: TPS – Thermal Power Station
Owing to space constraints in the small map, the actual locations in a larger map may vary slightly

.

=== Area overview ===
Bokaro district consists of undulating uplands on the Chota Nagpur Plateau with the Damodar River cutting a valley right across. It has an average elevation of 200 to 540 metres (660 to 1,770 ft) above mean sea level. The highest hill, Lugu Pahar, rises to a height of 1,070 metres (3,510 ft). The East Bokaro Coalfield located in the Bermo-Phusro area and small intrusions of Jharia Coalfield make Bokaro a coal rich district. In 1965, one of the largest steel manufacturing units in the country, Bokaro Steel Plant, operated by Steel Authority of India Limited, was set-up at Bokaro Steel City. The Damodar Valley Corporation established its first thermal power station at Bokaro (Thermal). The 5 kilometres (3.1 mi) long, 55 metres (180 ft) high earthfill dam with composite masonry cum concrete spillway, Tenughat Dam, across the Damodar River, is operated by the Government of Jharkhand. The average annual rainfall is 1,291.2 millimetres (50.83 in). The soil is generally infertile and agriculture is mostly rain-fed.

Note: The map alongside presents some of the notable locations in the district. All places marked in the map are linked in the larger full screen map.

== Civic administration ==
=== Police station ===
Nawadih police station is located at Nawadih. According to old British records, Nawadih PS was there after Giridh subdivision was formed (then in Hazaribagh district) in 1870.

=== CD block HQ ===
The headquarters of Nawadih CD block are located at Nawadih.

== Demographics ==
According to the 2011 Census of India, Nawadih had a total population of 4,362, of which 2,217 (51%) were males and 2,145 (49%) were females. Population in the age range 0-6 years was 648. The total number of literate persons in Nawadih was 2,642 (85.14% of the population over 6 years).

Pin Code of Nawadih is 827013 which comes under dhanbad postal division (Jharkhand Circle)

== Transport ==
The Dumri-Bermo-Jaina Road passes through Nawadih.
