= Chandrapura (community development block) =

- Community development block
- Location in Jharkhand, India Chandrapura (India)
- Coordinates: 23°44′44″N 86°7′8″E
- Country: India
- State: Jharkhand
- District: Bokaro

Government
  - Type: Representative democracy

Area
  - Total: 135.12 km^{2} (52.17 sq mi)

Population (2011)
  - Total: 132,162
  - Density: 978.11/km^{2} (2,533.3/sq mi)

Languages
  - Official: Hindi, Urdu

Literacy (2011)
  - Total literates: 86,011 (75.41%)
- Time zone: UTC+5:30 (IST)
- Vehicle registration: JH-09
- Lok Sabha constituency: Giridih
- Vidhan Sabha constituency: Bermo
- Website: bokaro.nic.in

Chandrapura is a community development block that forms an administrative division in the Bermo subdivision of the Bokaro district, Jharkhand state, India.

== Overview ==
Bokaro district, a part of the Chota Nagpur Plateau, has undulating surface with the altitude varying between 200 and 282 m. Topographically, the entire area is divided into three parts – the Bokaro uplands in the west, the Bokaro-Chas uplands in the middle and Barakar basin in the east. The general slope of the region is from the west to the east. The main rivers are the Damodar, Garga, Parga, Konar and Gobei. The district, covered with hills and forests, is a mining-industrial area. With the construction of the gigantic Bokaro Steel Plant in the nineteen sixties, it has become the focal point of this district.

== Maoist activities ==
Jharkhand is one of the states affected by Maoist activities. As of 2012, Bokaro was one of the 14 highly affected districts in the state.As of 2016, Bokaro was identified as one of the 13 focus areas by the state police to check Maoist activities.

== Geography ==
Chandrapura is located at 23°44′44″N 86°7′8″E.

Chandrapura CD block is bounded by Nawadih CD block on the north, Topchanchi and Baghmara CD blocks, in Dhanbad district, on the east, Chas and Jaridih CD blocks on the south and Petrawar and Bermo CD blocks on the west.

Chandrapura CD block has an area of 135.12 km^{2}. It has 23 gram panchayats, 30 villages and 7 census towns. Chandrapura and Dugda police stations are located in this CD block. Headquarters of this CD block is at Chandrapura.

The Damodar passes through this block. Chandrapura Thermal Power Station stands on the southern bank of the Damodar.

== Demographics ==
=== Population ===
According to the 2011 Census of India, Chandrapura CD block had a total population of 132,162, of which 48,776 were rural and 83,386 were urban. There were 68,881 (52%) males and 63,281 (48%) females. Population in the age range 0-6 years was 18,110. Scheduled Castes numbered 14,917 (11.29%) and Scheduled Tribes numbered 11,260 (8.52%).

Chandrapura CD block has several census towns (2011 population figure in brackets): Telo (14,274), Narra (5,390), Chandrapura (27,425), Termi (5,111), Bursera (4,070), Sijua (4,376) and Dugda (27,740).

Large villages (with 4,000+ population) in Chandrapura CD block are (2011 census figures in brackets): Bandio (4,401), Taranga (4,497), Taranari Madhubani (5,890) and Kurumba (4,890).

=== Literacy ===
As of 2011 census the total number of literate persons in Chandrapura CD block was 86,011 (75.41% of the population over 6 years) out of which males numbered 50,940 (85.85% of the male population over 6 years) and females numbered 35,071 (64.10% of the female population over 6 years). The gender disparity (the difference between female and male literacy rates) was 21.75%.

As of 2011 census, literacy in Bokaro district was 73.48% , Literacy in Jharkhand was 66.41% in 2011. Literacy in India in 2011 was 74.04%.

See also – List of Jharkhand districts ranked by literacy rate

Literacy in CD Blocks of
Bokaro district
Bermo subdivision
Nawadih – 62.55%
Chandrapura – 75.41%
Bermo – 79.04%
Gomia – 65.40%
Petarwar – 62.33%
Kasmar – 65.33%
Jaridih – 68.94%
Chas subdivision
Chas – 77.14%
Chandankiyari – 63.65%
Source: 2011 Census: CD Block Wise
Primary Census Abstract Data

=== Language ===
Hindi is the official language in Jharkhand and Urdu has been declared as an additional official language. Jharkhand legislature had passed a bill according the status of a second official language to several languages in 2011 but the same was turned down by the Governor.

In the 2001 census, the three most populous mother tongues (spoken language/ medium of communication between a mother and her children) in Bokaro district were (with percentage of total population in brackets): Khortha (41.08%), Hindi (17.05%) and Santali (10.78%). In the 2011 census, scheduled tribes constituted 12.40% of the total population of the district. The five most populous mother tongues were (with percentage of ST population in brackets): Santali (70.12%), Munda (17.05%), Oraon (5.90%), Karmali (4.23%) and Mahli (3.23%).

== Economy ==
=== Livelihood ===
Livelihood
in Chandrapura CD block
1. Cultivators (14.3%)
2. Agricultural labourers (10.1%)
3. Household industries (2.10%)
4. Other Workers (73.5%)

In Chandrapura CD block in 2011, amongst the class of total workers, cultivators numbered 5,480 and formed 14.34%, agricultural labourers numbered 3,851 and formed 10.07%, household industry workers numbered 804 and formed 2.10% and other workers numbered 28,089 and formed 73.49%. Total workers numbered 38,224 and formed 28.92% of the total population, and non-workers numbered 93,918 and formed 71.08% of the population.

Note: In the census records a person is considered a cultivator, if the person is engaged in cultivation/ supervision of land owned. When a person who works on another person's land for wages in cash or kind or share, is regarded as an agricultural labourer. Household industry is defined as an industry conducted by one or more members of the family within the household or village, and one that does not qualify for registration as a factory under the Factories Act. Other workers are persons engaged in some economic activity other than cultivators, agricultural labourers and household workers. It includes factory, mining, plantation, transport and office workers, those engaged in business and commerce, teachers, entertainment artistes and so on.

=== Infrastructure ===
There are 20 inhabited villages in Chandrapura CD block. In 2011, 18 villages had power supply. 3 villages had tap water (treated/ untreated), 20 villages had well water (covered/ uncovered), 20 villages had hand pumps, and all villages had drinking water facility. 3 villages had post offices, 3 villages had sub post offices, 1 village had telephone (land line) and 10 villages had mobile phone coverage. 20 villages had pucca (hard top) village roads, no village had bus service (public/ private), no village had autos/ modified autos, and 10 villages had tractors. 1 village had a bank branch, no village had agricultural credit society, no village had cinema/ video hall, no village had public library and public reading room. 12 villages had public distribution system, 5 villages had weekly haat (market) and 15 villages had assembly polling stations.

=== Power and coal ===
The 890 MW Chandrapura Thermal Power Station of Damodar Valley Corporation at Chandrapura was placed in commercial operation progressively between October 1964 and July 2011.

Dugda Coal Washery of Bharat Coking Coal Limited at Dugda has two units: Dugda I with annual capacity of 1 million tonnes per year washes non-coking coal, Dugda II with annual capacity of 2 million tonnes per year washes coking coal.

=== Agriculture ===
The average annual rainfall in Bokaro district is 1291.2 mm. The soil is generally laterite and sandy. 39.21% of the total area is under agriculture. It is generally a single monsoon-dependent crop. 9.90% of the cultivable land is under horticulture. Rice and maize are the main crops. Bajara, wheat, pulses and vegetables are also grown.

=== Backward Regions Grant Fund ===
Bokaro district is listed as a backward region and receives financial support from the Backward Regions Grant Fund. The fund created by the Government of India is designed to redress regional imbalances in development. As of 2012, 272 districts across the country were listed under this scheme. The list includes 21 districts of Jharkhand.

== Education ==
In 2011, amongst the 20 inhabited villages in Chandrapura CD block, 2 villages had no primary school, 12 villages had one primary school and 6 villages had more than one primary school. 13 villages had at least one primary school and one middle school. 4 villages had at least one middle school and one secondary school. Chandrapura CD block had 2 senior secondary schools and 1 degree college.

RPS College, Chandrapura, established in 1986, is affiliated to Vinoba Bhave University. It offers courses in arts, science and commerce.

== Healthcare ==
In 2011, amongst the 20 inhabited villages in Chandrapura CD block, 7 villages had primary health sub-centres, 3 villages had medicine shops and 7 villages had no medical facilities.
