= Nawadih block =

Nawadih
- Community development block
- Location in Jharkhand, India Nawadih (India)
- Coordinates: 23°51′32″N 86°2′41″E
- Country: India
- State: Jharkhand
- District: Bokaro

Government
  - Type: Representative democracy

Area
  - Total: 308.92 km^{2} (119.27 sq mi)
- Elevation: 216 m (709 ft)

Population (2011)
  - Total: 138,454
  - Density: 448.19/km^{2} (1,160.8/sq mi)

Languages
  - Official: Hindi, Urdu

Literacy (2011)
  - Total literates: 72,697 (62.55%)
- Time zone: UTC+5:30 (IST)
- PIN: 829144 (Phusro Bazar)
- Telephone/STD code: 06549
- Vehicle registration: JH
- Lok Sabha constituency: Giridih
- Vidhan Sabha constituency: Dumri
- Website: bokaro.nic.in

Nawadih is a community development block that forms an administrative division in the Bermo subdivision of the Bokaro district, Jharkhand state,

== Overview ==
Bokaro district, a part of the Chota Nagpur Plateau, has undulating surface with the altitude varying between 200 and 282 m. Topographically, the entire area is divided into three parts – the Bokaro uplands in the west, the Bokaro-Chas uplands in the middle and Barakar basin in the east. The general slope of the region is from the west to the east. The main rivers are the Damodar, Garga, Parga, Konar and Gobei. The district, covered with hills and forests, is a mining-industrial area. With the construction of the gigantic Bokaro Steel Plant in the nineteen sixties, it has become the focal point of this district.

== Maoist activities ==
Jharkhand is one of the states affected by Maoist activities. As of 2012, Bokaro was one of the 14 highly affected districts in the state.As of 2016, Bokaro was identified as one of the 13 focus areas by the state police to check Maoist activities.

== Geography ==
Nawadih is located at 23°51′32″N 86°2′41″E.

Nawadih CD block is bounded by Dumri, CD block, in Giridih district, on the north, Topchanchi CD block, in Dhanbad district, and Chandrapura CD block, on the east, Bermo CD block on the south and Bishnugarh CD block, in Hazaribagh district, on the west.

Nawadih CD block has an area of 308.92 km^{2}. It has 24 gram panchayats, 70 villages and 1 census town. The Nawadih police station is located in this CD block. Headquarters of this CD block is at Nawadih.

== Demographics ==
=== Population ===
According to the 2011 Census of India, Nawadih CD block had a total population of 138,454, of which 133,848 were rural and 4,606 were urban. There were 70,344 (51%) males and 68,110 (49%) females. Population in the age range 0-6 years was 22,236. Scheduled Castes numbered 18,476 (13.34%) and Scheduled Tribes numbered 17,345 (12.53%).

Bhandra, with a population of 4,606 in 2011, is a census town in Nawadih CD block.

Large villages (with 4,000+ population) in Nawadih CD block are (2011 census figures in brackets): Penk (8,017), Goniatu (5,060), Kanjkiro (5,886), Palamu (5,379), Surhi (4,790), Saharia (4,606), Chiruddih (4,182), Nawadih (4,362) and Birni (4,829).

=== Literacy ===
As of 2011 census the total number of literate persons in Nawadih CD block was 72,697 (62.55% of the population over 6 years) out of which males numbered 44,343 (75.19% of the male population over 6 years) and females numbered 28,354 (49.43% of the female population over 6 years). The gender disparity (the difference between female and male literacy rates) was 25.65%.

As of 2011 census, literacy in Bokaro district was 73.48% , Literacy in Jharkhand was 66.41% in 2011. Literacy in India in 2011 was 74.04%.

See also – List of Jharkhand districts ranked by literacy rate

Literacy in CD Blocks of
Bokaro district
Bermo subdivision
Nawadih – 62.55%
Chandrapura – 75.41%
Bermo – 79.04%
Gomia – 65.40%
Petarwar – 62.33%
Kasmar – 65.33%
Jaridih – 68.94%
Chas subdivision
Chas – 77.14%
Chandankiyari – 63.65%
Source: 2011 Census: CD Block Wise
Primary Census Abstract Data

=== Language ===
Hindi is the official language in Jharkhand and Urdu has been declared as an additional official language. Jharkhand legislature had passed a bill according the status of a second official language to several languages in 2011 but the same was turned down by the Governor.

In the 2001 census, the three most populous mother tongues (spoken language/ medium of communication between a mother and her children) in Bokaro district were (with percentage of total population in brackets): Khortha (41.08%), Hindi (17.05%) and Santali (10.78%). In the 2011 census, scheduled tribes constituted 12.40% of the total population of the district. The five most populous mother tongues were (with percentage of ST population in brackets): Santali (70.12%), Munda (17.05%), Oraon (5.90%), Karmali (4.23%) and Mahli (3.23%).

== Economy ==
=== Livelihood ===
Livelihood
in Nawadih CD block
1. Cultivators (30.2%)
2. Agricultural labourers (27.6%)
3. Household industries (3.07%)
4. Other Workers (39.1%)

In Nawadih CD block in 2011, amongst the class of total workers, cultivators numbered 15,981 and formed 30.21%, agricultural labourers numbered 14,589 and formed 27.58%, household industry workers numbered 1,624 and formed 3.07% and other workers numbered 20,710 and formed 39.15%. Total workers numbered 52,904 and formed 38.21% of the total population, and non-workers numbered 85,550 and formed 61.79% of the population.

Note: In the census records a person is considered a cultivator, if the person is engaged in cultivation/ supervision of land owned. When a person who works on another person's land for wages in cash or kind or share, is regarded as an agricultural labourer. Household industry is defined as an industry conducted by one or more members of the family within the household or village, and one that does not qualify for registration as a factory under the Factories Act. Other workers are persons engaged in some economic activity other than cultivators, agricultural labourers and household workers. It includes factory, mining, plantation, transport and office workers, those engaged in business and commerce, teachers, entertainment artistes and so on.

=== Infrastructure ===
There are 67 inhabited villages in Nawadih CD block. In 2011, 50 villages had power supply. 3 villages had tap water (treated/ untreated), 67 villages had well water (covered/ uncovered), 66 villages had hand pumps, and all villages had drinking water facility. 13 villages had post offices, 10 villages had sub post offices, 6 villages had telephones (land lines) and 41 villages had mobile phone coverage. 66 villages had pucca (hard top) village roads, 9 villages had bus service (public/ private), 4 village had autos/ modified autos, and 37 villages had tractors. 5 villages had bank branches, 1 village had agricultural credit society, no village had cinema/ video hall, no village had public library and public reading room. 40 villages had public distribution system, 13 villages had weekly haat (market) and 39 villages had assembly polling stations.

=== Agriculture ===
The average annual rainfall in Bokaro district is 1291.2 mm. The soil is generally laterite and sandy. 39.21% of the total area is under agriculture. It is generally a single monsoon-dependent crop. 9.90% of the cultivable land is under horticulture. Rice and maize are the main crops. Bajara, wheat, pulses and vegetables are also grown.

=== Backward Regions Grant Fund ===
Bokaro district is listed as a backward region and receives financial support from the Backward Regions Grant Fund. The fund created by the Government of India is designed to redress regional imbalances in development. As of 2012, 272 districts across the country were listed under this scheme. The list includes 21 districts of Jharkhand.

== Education ==
In 2011, amongst the 67 inhabited villages in Nawadih CD block, 3 villages had no primary school, 56 villages had one primary school and 8 villages had more than one primary school. 38 villages had at least one primary school and one middle school. 6 villages had at least one middle school and one secondary school. Nawadih CD block had 1 senior secondary school.

== Healthcare ==
In 2011, amongst the 67 inhabited villages in Nawadih CD block, 3 villages had primary health centres, 3 villages had primary health sub-centres, 1 village had an allopathic hospital, 1 village had a dispensary, 2 villages had medicine shops and 49 villages had no medical facilities.
