= Pitts Modern School =

Location
- Dist : Bokaro; P.O: I.E.Gomia; Gomia, Jharkhand, 829112; India
- Coordinates: 23.8190389°N 85.823457°E

Information
- Motto: Tamaso Maa Jyotir Gamaya (O Lord! Lead us from darkness unto light)
- Established: 8 December 1967
- Founder: Sir Cyril A. Pitts
- School board: CBSE
- School district: BOKARO
- Chairperson: Mr. B.K.Dubey
- Principal: Manoj Kumar Upadhayay
- Grades: kindergarten through class XII
- Average class size: 45
- Language: English
- Campus size: 2.67 Acres
- Houses: Ashok, Magadh, Vikram, Vaishali
- Nickname: PMS
- Affiliation: Central Board of Secondary Education

Pitts Modern School is located in Gomia in the Bokaro district of Jharkhand, India.

It was established on 8 December 1967 by Sir Cyril A. Pitts, former chairperson of the ICI India Limited, a division of Imperial Chemical Industries, a United Kingdom-based chemical company.

ICI is now Indian Explosives Limited (IEL), which is a joint venture between ICI India and Orica Limited, an Australian-based multinational corporation that manufactures various chemical products.

Although the school is managed by the Gomia School Society with the Bishop of Chota-Nagpur as its chairperson, the board members also include some of the contributing senior officers of IEL-Gomia.

It is permanently affiliated with India's Central Board of Secondary Education and is an English medium school with students from kindergarten through class XII.

At the 10+2 level, all streams of science, commerce and humanities are available as options. CCE has been implemented in classes I to X. At the plus two level are English, Physics, Chemistry, Mathematics, Biology, Computer Science, Accountancy, Business Studies, Economics, Fine Arts and Hindi, with a highly sophisticated language laboratory (based on TOEFL) et al. Some of the class rooms have CCD video cameras with speaker facilities. Although the school started with only 50 students and 6 staff members, today it has approximately 2000 students and a staff of approximately 80.

It has a very rich and enviable academic and co-curricular history. Apart from being mentioned as the nationwide 'Model School/Institution' twice in the education bill presented in the parliament, it is also one of the very few (20 odd) schools all over the country to have 'permanent affiliation' from CBSE, New Delhi.

== Principals ==
- Mr. Sadiqque
- Lt. Col. D. N. Sahani
- Mr. J. R. Parashar
- Mr. Jaswant Singh
- Mr. Arvind Kumar Sinha
- Mr. Manoj Kumar Upadhayay
- Mr. Brij Mohan Lal Das

== Vice Chairmans ==
- Mr. SMZ Hassan
- Mr. K J Koruth
- Mr. D C Mahato
- Mr. Ravi Pratap Sinha
- Mr. Rajesh Sharma
- Mr. Devi Acharya
- Mr. V V Ramana Rao
- Mr. B K Dubey
- Mr. Arindam Dasgupta

== See also ==
- Education in India
- Literacy in India
- List of schools in India
