= Dugda =

Dugda Deonagar
- Census Town
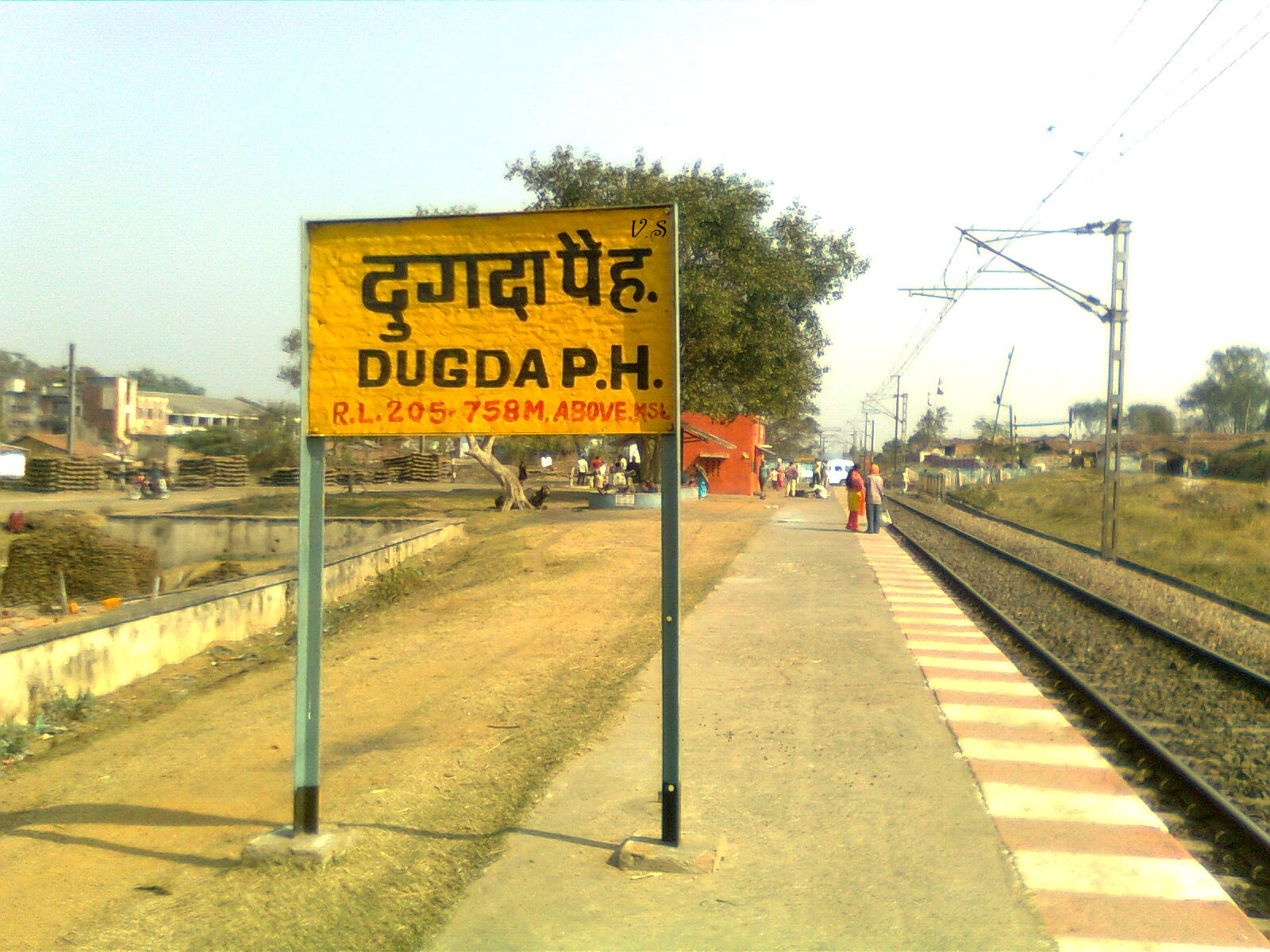
- Dugda Platform Halt

- Location in Jharkhand, India
- Coordinates: 23.7558°N 86.1534°E
- Country: India
- State: Jharkhand
- District: Bokaro

Area
  - Total: 12.29 km^{2} (4.75 sq mi)
- Elevation: 205 m (673 ft)

Population (census 2011)
  - Total: 22,740
  - Density: 1,850/km^{2} (4,792/sq mi)

Languages
  - Spoken: Hindi, Khortha, Bengali, Bhojpuri
  - Official: Hindi, Urdu
- Time zone: UTC+5:30 (IST)
- PIN: 828404
- Telephone code: 91-06549
- Lok Sabha constituency: Giridih
- Vidhan Sabha constituency: Bermo
- Website: bokaro.nic.in
- Known for Dugda Coal Washery, under Coal India Limited.

Dugda (also known as Deonagar) is a census town in the Chandrapura CD block in the Bermo subdivision of the Bokaro district in the state of Jharkhand, India. It is a small township, constructed during the 1970s, situated under the foot of several small hills. Residents of the township are primarily employees of Dugda Coal Washery under Bharat Coking Coal Limited (BCCL).

== Geography ==
Cities, towns and locations in Bokaro district in North Chotanagpur Division
M: municipal town, CT: census town, R: rural/ urban centre, F: Factory, A: Coal Mining Area
Abbreviation used: TPS – Thermal Power Station
Owing to space constraints in the small map, the actual locations in a larger map may vary slightly

=== Location ===
Dugda is located at 23.7558°N 86.1534°E. It has an average elevation of 218 metres (715 feet).

=== Area overview ===
Bokaro district consists of undulating uplands on the Chota Nagpur Plateau with the Damodar River cutting a valley right across. It has an average elevation of 200 to 540 metres (660 to 1,770 ft) above mean sea level. The highest hill, Lugu Pahar, rises to a height of 1,070 metres (3,510 ft). The East Bokaro Coalfield located in the Bermo-Phusro area and small intrusions of Jharia Coalfield make Bokaro a coal rich district. In 1965, one of the largest steel manufacturing units in the country, Bokaro Steel Plant, operated by Steel Authority of India Limited, was set-up at Bokaro Steel City. The Damodar Valley Corporation established its first thermal power station at Bokaro (Thermal). The 5 kilometres (3.1 mi) long, 55 metres (180 ft) high earthfill dam with composite masonry cum concrete spillway, Tenughat Dam, across the Damodar River, is operated by the Government of Jharkhand. The average annual rainfall is 1,291.2 millimetres (50.83 in). The soil is generally infertile and agriculture is mostly rain-fed.

Note: The map alongside presents some of the notable locations in the district. All places marked in the map are linked in the larger full screen map.

== Demographics ==
According to the 2011 Census of India, Dugda had a total population of 22,740, of which 11,912 (52%) were males and 10,828 (48%) were females. Population in the age range 0-6 years was 2,715. The total number of literate persons in Dugda was 15,794 (78.87% of the population over 6 years).

As of 2001 India census, Dugda had a population of 18,864. Males constitute 54% of the population and females 46%. Dugda has an average literacy rate of 66%, higher than the national average of 59.5%: male literacy is 77% and, female literacy is 54%. In Dugda, 14% of the population is under 6 years of age.

== Infrastructure ==
According to the District Census Handbook 2011, Bokaro, Dugda covered an area of 12.29 km^{2}. Among the civic amenities, it had 13 km roads with both open and close drains, the protected water supply involved tap water from treated sources, hand pump, overhead tank. It had 3,838 domestic electric connections, 110 road lighting points. Among the medical facilities, it had 2 hospitals, 2 dispensaries, 2 health centres, 4 family welfare centers, 4 maternity and child welfare centers, 15 maternity homes, 4 nursing homes, 5 medicine shop. Among the educational facilities it had 18 primary school, 6 middle schools, 3 secondary schools, 2 senior secondary schools, 1 general degree college. It had 1 non-formal educational centre (Sarva Siksha Abhiyan). Among the social, recreational and cultural facilities it had 1 stadium, 4 auditorium/ community halls, 1 public library, 1 reading room. One important commodity it produced was coal. It had the branch office of 2 nationalised banks, 1 cooperative bank, 1 agricultural credit society, 4 non-agricultural credit societies. There are 4 big ground situated for sports activities. Yearly once football event will occur and people from near around places of Dugda will join the football league of Dugda.

== Economy ==
Dugda Coal Washery of BCCL at Dugda has two units: Dugda I with annual capacity of 1 million tonnes per year washes non-coking coal, Dugda II with annual capacity of 2 million tonnes per year washes coking coal.

== Place of interest ==
Khadeshwari Temple - It is a famous temple of goddess Durga, not only the people of Dugda but also for near around places. This place is also known as Pahari Mandir as it is situated on the top of the hill.

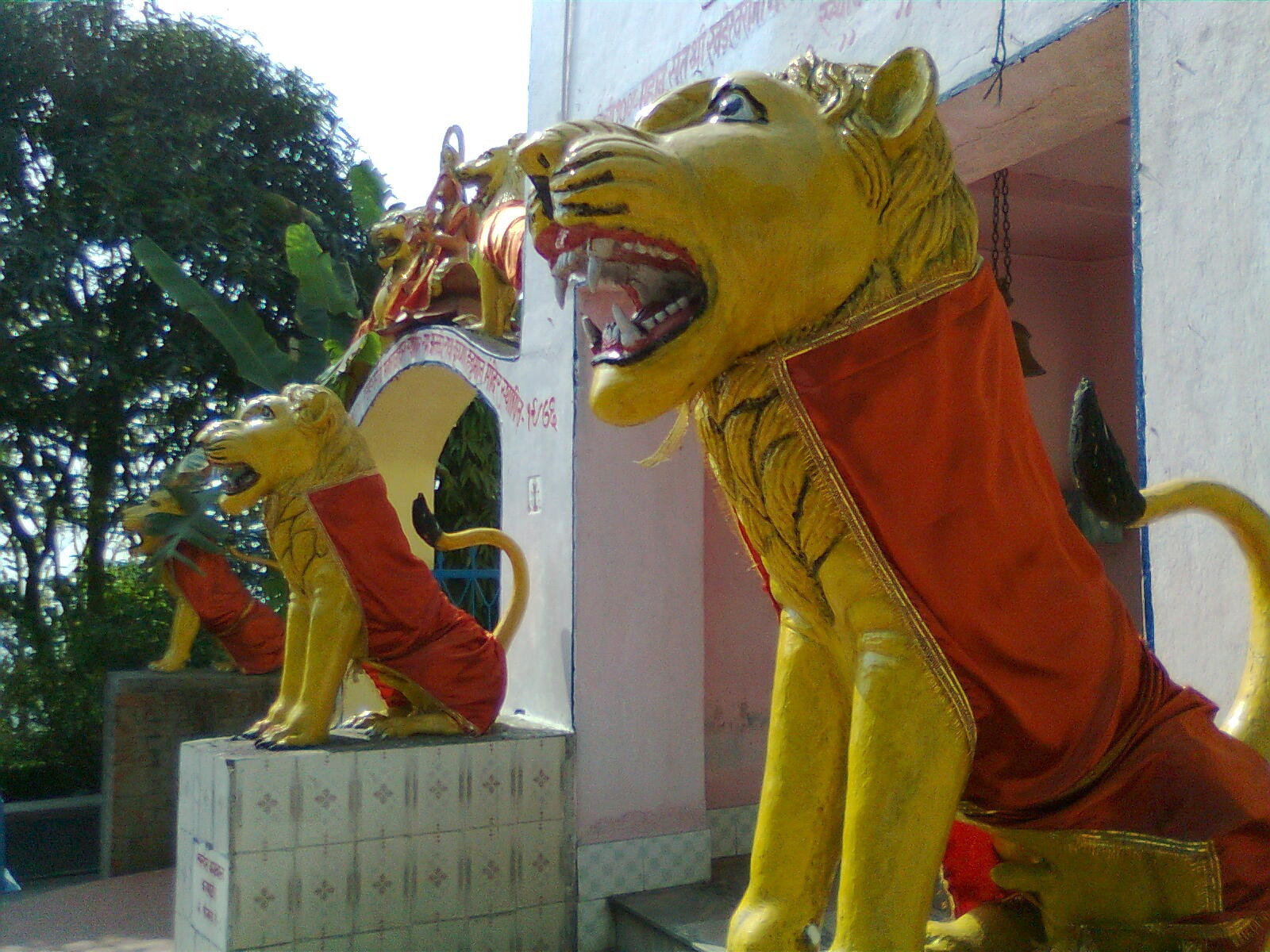
Pahari Mandir

Milan Kendra - This is the marriage ceremony hall for the people.

Hanuman Mandir - There are three Hanuman Mandirs situated in the town. One in the middle of the market, second just below New B.C.C.L. Colony and the third one is in B.C.C.L Colony.

Shiva Mandir -There are three Shiva Mandir one temple is situated at the rear side of the main market and another one is in the middle of New B.C.C.L. Colony and third one is in railway colony. It is the temple of Lord Shiva as the main deity, along with many other Hindu Gods.

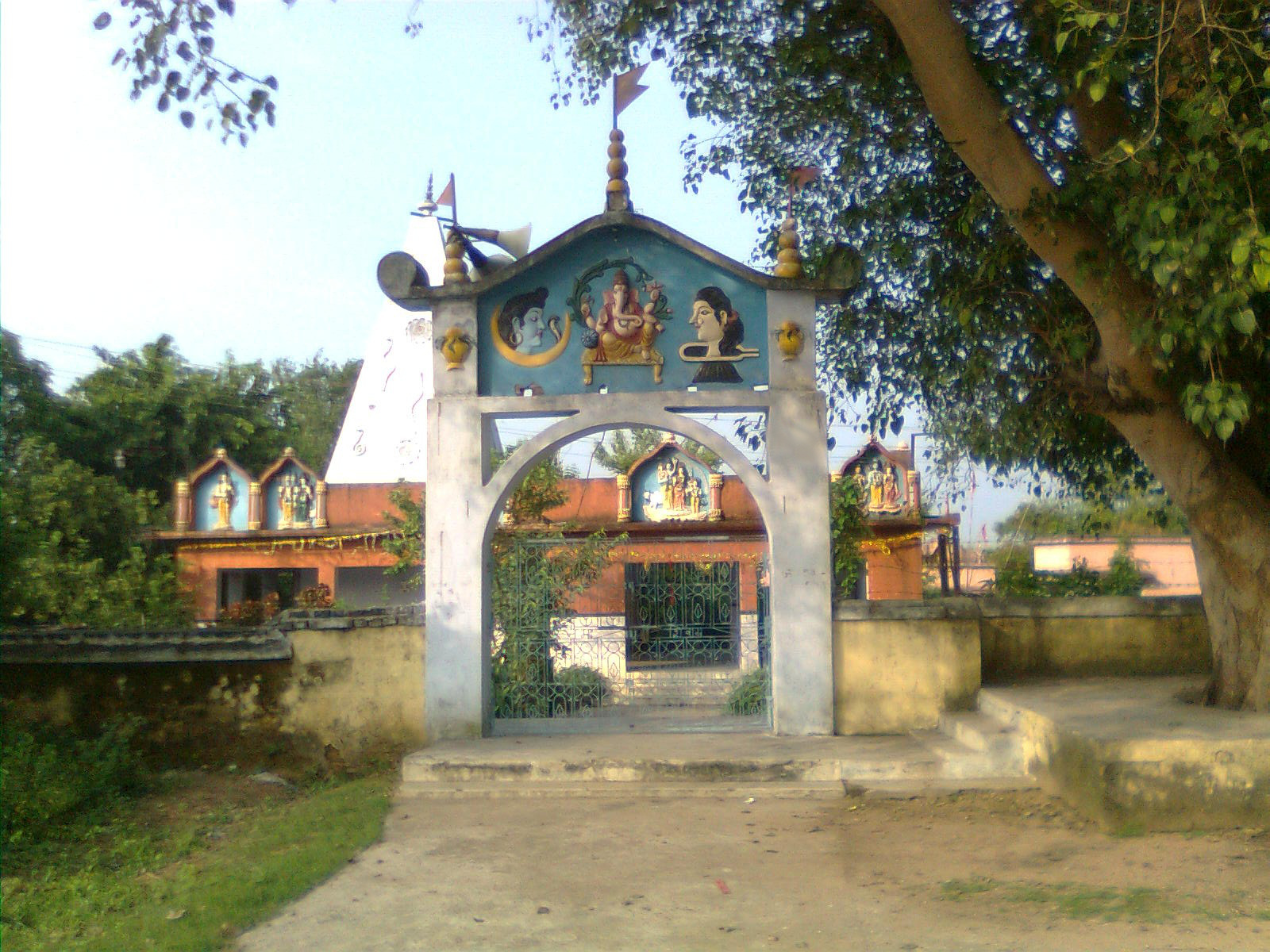
Shiv Mandir Dugda

Apart from these, there is also a Gurudwara and a Mosque.

== Educational institutions ==
Schools

- Pandit Bageshwari Pandey Saraswati Shishu Vidya Mandir, Dugda, Bokaro
- Saraswati Vidya Mandir Dugda-Basti, Bokaro
- D.A.V Public school Dugda, Bokaro
- Bal Vikas School Dugda, Bokaro
- Vidya Sagar High School Dugda, Bokaro
- High School Dugda, Bokaro
- Sunrise Public School dugda, Bokaro

== Gallery ==
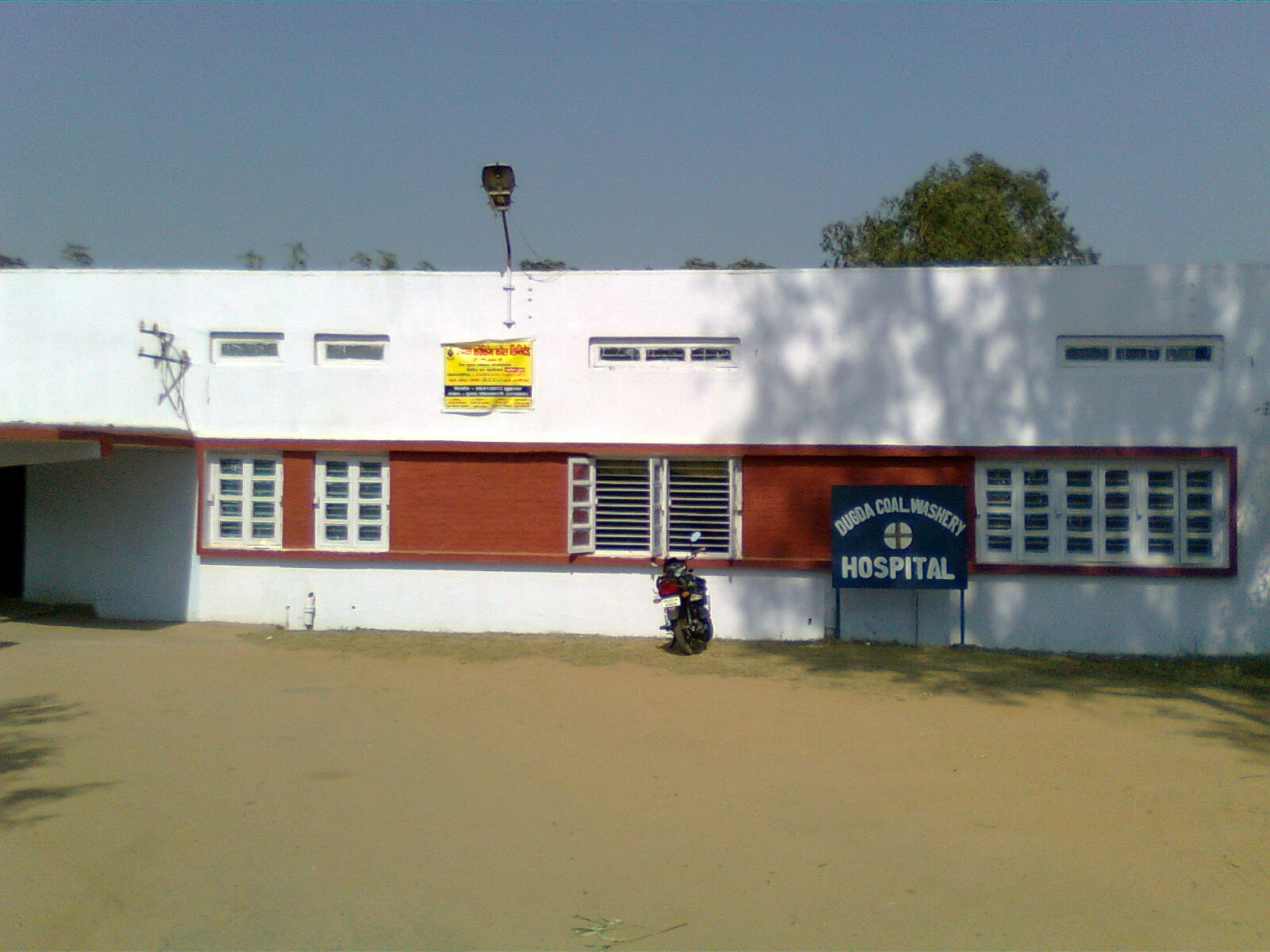
Dugda Hospital

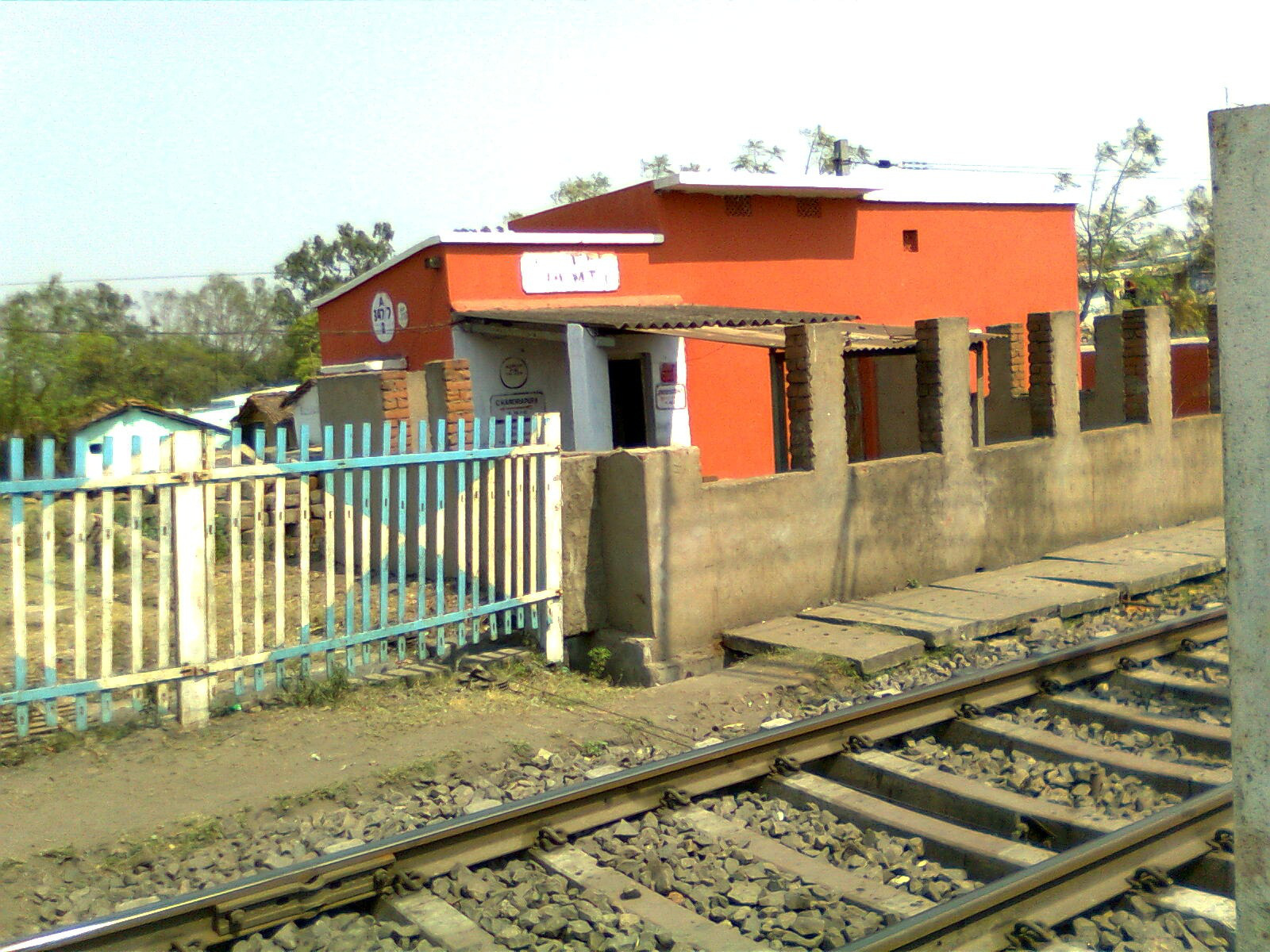
Dugda PH

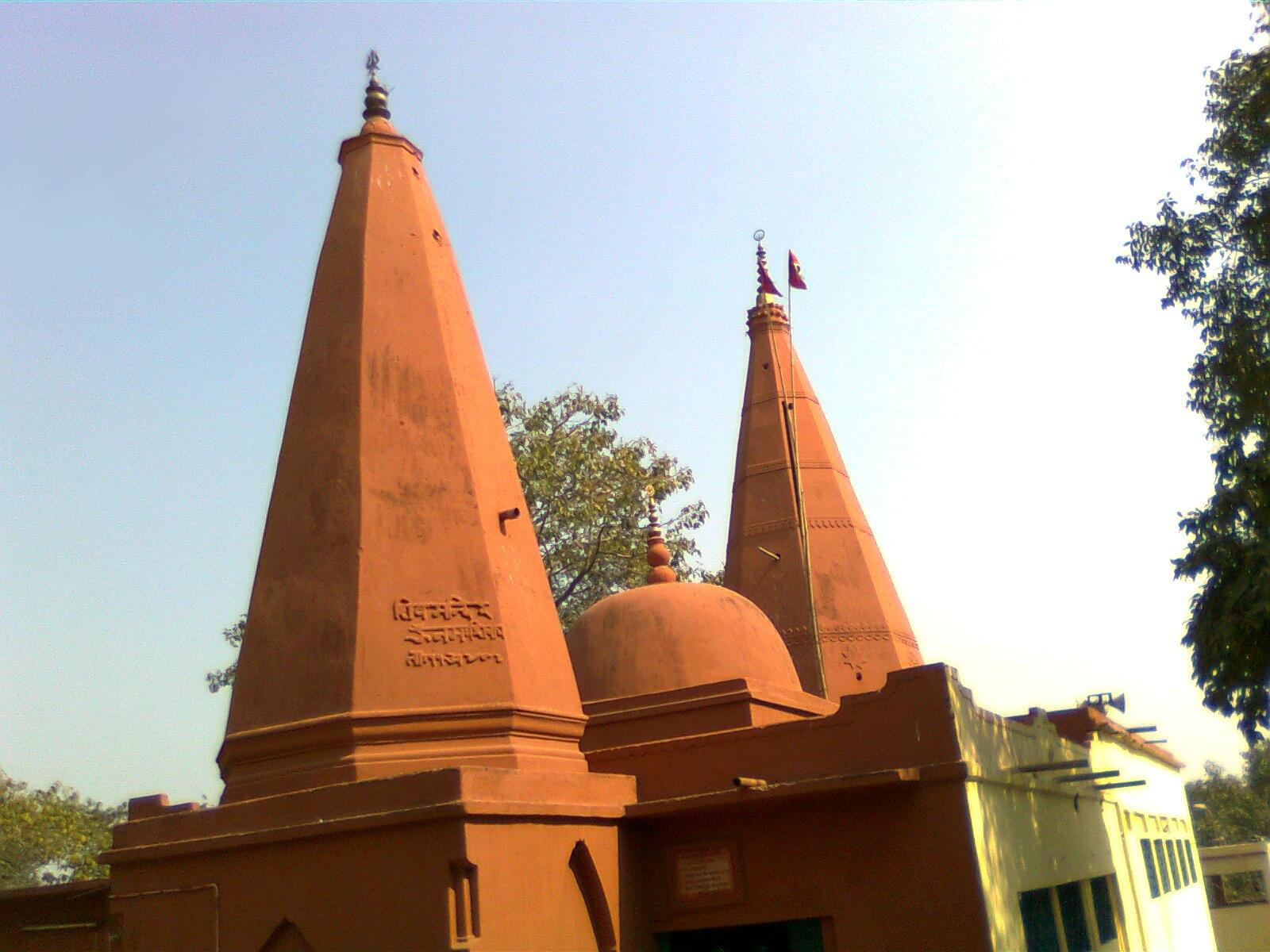
Pahari mandir

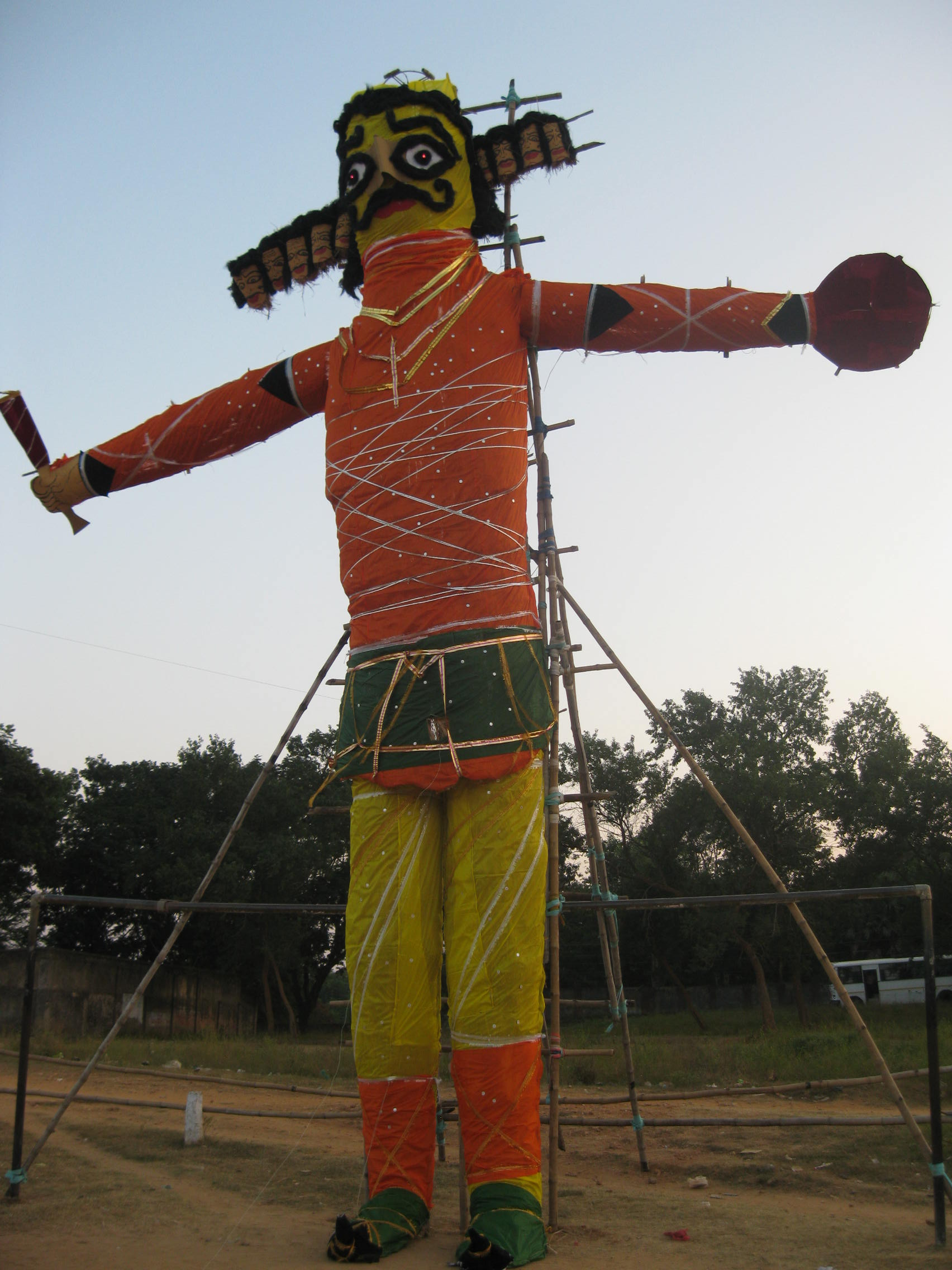
Ravan Dahan Utsav, Dugda
