= Tenughat Thermal Power Station =

Coal-based thermal power plant in Jharkhand, India

Tenughat Thermal Power Station is a coal-based thermal power plant located at Lalpania in Bokaro district in the Indian state of Jharkhand. The power plant is owned by Jharkhand State owned Tenughat Vidyut Nigam Limited.

== Capacity ==
It has an installed capacity of 420 MW (2x210 MW).
