= East Bokaro Coalfield =

Coalfield in Jharkhand, India

- Location in Jharkhand
- Location: Jharkhand, India; 23°48′N 85°45′E
- Company: Central Coalfields Limited
- Website: Central Coalfields
- Acquired: 1975

East Bokaro Coalfield is located in Bokaro district in the Indian state of Jharkhand.

== Overview ==
In 1917, L.S.S. O’Malley described the coalfields in the upper reaches of the Damodar as follows: “Near the western boundary of Jharia field is that of Bokaro, covering 220 square miles (570 km^{2}), with an estimated content of 1,500 million tons; close by… is the Ramgarh field 40 square miles (100 km^{2}), in which, however, coal is believed to be of inferior quality. A still larger field in the same district is that called Karanpura, which extends over 544 square miles (1,410 km^{2}) and has an estimated capacity of 9,000 million tons.”

== The Coalfield ==
Collieries in the CCL Bokaro and Kargali Area and CCL Dhori Area (both in East Bokaro Coalfield)
U: Underground colliery, O: Open Cast colliery, M: Mixed colliery, W: Washery, S: F: Facility, A: Administrative headquarters
Owing to space constraints in the small map, the actual locations in a larger map may vary slightly
Collieries in the CCL Kathara Area (East Bokaro Coalfield)
U: Underground colliery, O: Open Cast colliery, M: Mixed colliery, W: Washery, S: Facility, A: Administrative headquarters
Owing to space constraints in the small map, the actual locations in a larger map may vary slightly

=== Location ===
The Bokaro coalfield lies between 23°45' and 23°50' North latitude and 85°30' and 86°03' East longitude. It spreads 65 km (40 mi) from east to west and 10–16 km (6.2–9.9 mi) from north to south. Bokaro West and Bokaro East are two subdivisions of the field, separated almost in the middle by Lugu Hill (height 960.9 m; 3,153 ft).

Bokaro River passes through the West Bokaro and East Bokaro coalfields.

East Bokaro Coalfield covers an area of 208 square kilometres (80 sq mi) and has total coal reserves of 4,473.66 million tonnes.

=== Reserves ===
Geolological reserves in East Bokaro Coalfield in million tonnes as on 1/4/2010:

Type of Coal	Proved	Indicated	Inferred (exploration)	Total
Medium coking coal	3247.80	3805.60	863.32	7916.72
Non-coking coal	104.07	62.50	0	166.57
Total	3351.87	3868.10	863.32	8083.29

== Projects ==
CCL Operational Area	Projects
B&K Area	Bokaro open cast, Kargali open cast, Kargali underground, Karo opencast, Karo underground, Khas Mahal opencast, Khas Mahal underground, Karo Special underground, Kargali Washery
Dhori Area	Amlo opencast, Dhori open cast, Selected Dhori Quarry No. I open cast, Selected Dhori Quarry No. III open cast, New Selected Dhori underground, Dhori Khas underground
Kathara Area	Kathara open cast, Jarangdih opencast, Jarangdih underground, Sawang opencast/ underground, Govindpur underground, Kathara Washery, Swang Washery
Non-CCL mines	DVC Bermo colliery

== Transport ==
In 1927, the Central India Coalfields Railway opened the Barkakana–Netaji S.C.Bose Gomoh line. It was extended to Daltonganj in 1929. Later these lines were amalgamated with East Indian Railway.
