= Siyaljori =

- Village
- Location in Jharkhand, India Siyaljori (India)
- Coordinates: 23.634102°N 86.304522°E
- Country: India
- State: Jharkhand
- District: Bokaro
- Elevation: 158 m (518 ft)

Languages
  - Official: Hindi, Urdu
- Time zone: UTC+5:30 (IST)
- PIN: 828303 (Jogidih)
- Telephone/ STD code: 0326

Siyaljori is a village in the Chandankiyari CD block in the Chas subdivision of the Bokaro district in the Indian state of Jharkhand.

== Geography ==
Cities, towns and locations in Bokaro district in North Chotanagpur Division
M: municipal town, CT: census town, R: rural/ urban centre, F: Factory, A: Coal Mining Area
Abbreviation used: TPS – Thermal Power Station
Owing to space constraints in the small map, the actual locations in a larger map may vary slightly

=== Location ===
It is located 17 km from Bokaro Steel City and 6 km from Chandankiyari.

=== Area overview ===
Bokaro district consists of undulating uplands on the Chota Nagpur Plateau with the Damodar River cutting a valley right across. It has an average elevation of 200 to 540 metres (660 to 1,770 ft) above mean sea level. The highest hill, Lugu Pahar, rises to a height of 1,070 metres (3,510 ft). The East Bokaro Coalfield located in the Bermo-Phusro area and small intrusions of Jharia Coalfield make Bokaro a coal rich district. In 1965, one of the largest steel manufacturing units in the country, Bokaro Steel Plant, operated by Steel Authority of India Limited, was set-up at Bokaro Steel City. The Damodar Valley Corporation established its first thermal power station at Bokaro (Thermal). The 5 kilometres (3.1 mi) long, 55 metres (180 ft) high earthfill dam with composite masonry cum concrete spillway, Tenughat Dam, across the Damodar River, is operated by the Government of Jharkhand. The average annual rainfall is 1,291.2 millimetres (50.83 in). The soil is generally infertile and agriculture is mostly rain-fed.

Note: The map alongside presents some of the notable locations in the district. All places marked in the map are linked in the larger full screen map.

== Civic administration ==
=== Police station ===
Siyaljori police station is located at Siyaljori.

== Demographics ==
According to the 2011 Census of India, Silajuri had a total population of 4,954, of which 3,080 (62%) were males and 1,874 (38%) were females. Population in the age range 0-6 years was 586. The total number of literate persons in Silajuri was 3,134 (88.17% of the population over 6 years).

== Economy ==
Electrosteel Steels Limited, whose initial promoters were the Kolkata-based Kejriwal family of the Electrosteel Group, whose flagship is the ductile iron pipe pioneers, Electrosteel Castings, was setting up a 2.51 million tonnes per annum integrated steel plant at Sialjory. The company had acquired 1,723.44 hectares of land for the plant. Vedanta Limited acquired control of Electrosteels Steels Limited in 2018.
