= Amlabad =

- Census Town
- Location in Jharkhand, India Amlabad (India)
- Coordinates: 23.684°N 86.374°E
- Country: India
- State: Jharkhand
- District: Bokaro

Area
  - Total: 2.89 km^{2} (1.12 sq mi)

Population (2011)
  - Total: 4,636
  - Density: 1,600/km^{2} (4,150/sq mi)

Languages
  - Official: Hindi, Urdu
- Time zone: UTC+5:30 (IST)
- PIN: 828303
- Telephone/STD code: 0326
- Vehicle registration: JH-09
- Lok Sabha constituency: Dhanbad
- Vidhan Sabha constituency: Chandanhiyari
- Website: bokaro.nic.in

Amlabad is a census town in the Chandankiyari CD blocks in the Chas subdivision of the Bokaro district in the state of Jharkhand, India.

== Geography ==
Cities, towns and locations in Bokaro district in North Chotanagpur Division
M: municipal town, CT: census town, R: rural/ urban centre, F: Factory, A: Coal Mining Area
Abbreviation used: TPS – Thermal Power Station
Owing to space constraints in the small map, the actual locations in a larger map may vary slightly

=== Location ===
Amlabad is located at 23.684°N 86.374°E.

=== Area overview ===
Bokaro district consists of undulating uplands on the Chota Nagpur Plateau with the Damodar River cutting a valley right across. It has an average elevation of 200 to 540 metres (660 to 1,770 ft) above mean sea level. The highest hill, Lugu Pahar, rises to a height of 1,070 metres (3,510 ft). The East Bokaro Coalfield located in the Bermo-Phusro area and small intrusions of Jharia Coalfield make Bokaro a coal rich district. In 1965, one of the largest steel manufacturing units in the country, Bokaro Steel Plant, operated by Steel Authority of India Limited, was set-up at Bokaro Steel City. The Damodar Valley Corporation established its first thermal power station at Bokaro (Thermal). The 5 kilometres (3.1 mi) long, 55 metres (180 ft) high earthfill dam with composite masonry cum concrete spillway, Tenughat Dam, across the Damodar River, is operated by the Government of Jharkhand. The average annual rainfall is 1,291.2 millimetres (50.83 in). The soil is generally infertile and agriculture is mostly rain-fed.

Note: The map alongside presents some of the notable locations in the district. All places marked in the map are linked in the larger full screen map.

== Demographics ==
According to the 2011 Census of India, Amlabad had a total population of 4,636, of which 2,477 (53%) were males and 2,159 (49%) were females. Population in the age range 0–6 years was 572. The total number of literate persons in Amlabad was 3,078 (75.74% of the population over 6 years).

As of 2001 India census, Amlabad had a population of 4,723. Males constitute 55% of the population and females 45%. Amlabad has an average literacy rate of 66%, higher than the national average of 59.5%; with 64% of the males and 36% of females literate. 13% of the population is under 6 years of age.

== Infrastructure ==
According to the District Census Handbook 2011, Bokaro, Amlabad covered an area of 2.89 km^{2}. Among the civic amenities, it had 14 km roads with open drains, the protected water supply involved tapwater from treated and untreated sources, overhead tank. It had 868 domestic electric connections, 120 road lighting points. Among the medical facilities, it had 30 hospitals, 3 dispensaries, 3 health centres, 30 family welfare centres, 30 maternity and child welfare centres, 30 maternity homes, 30 nursing homes, no medicine shops. Among the educational facilities it had 3 primary schools, 1 middle school, the nearest secondary school, senior secondary school at Bhojudih 9 km away. Among the social, recreational and cultural facilities it had 1 auditorium/ community hall. It had the branch office of 1 nationalised bank.

== Economy ==
Collieries in the Lodna and Eastern Jharia Areas of BCCL
U: Underground colliery, O: Open Cast colliery, M: Mixed colliery, W: Washery, F: Facility, A: Administrative headquarters
Owing to space constraints in the small map, the actual locations in a larger map may vary slightly

Amlabad Project which is a colliery in the Eastern Jharia Area of Bharat Coking Coal Limited has reserves of 45.94 million tonnes of coal (as in 2015).

Collieries functioning in the Eastern Jharia Area of BCCL are: Bhowrah North, Bhowrah South, Bhowrah (OC 3 Pit), Amlabad, Sudamdih Incline, Sudamdih Shafts, Pathardih and C.O.C.R.

Note: In the map alongside the places marked are NOT linked because collieries/ washeries do not have separate pages
