= Pindrajora =

- Location in Jharkhand, India Pindrajora (India)
- Coordinates: 23.515556°N 86.202750°E
- Country: India
- State: Jharkhand
- District: Bokaro

Languages
  - Official: Hindi, Urdu
- Time zone: UTC+5:30 (IST)
- Postal code: PIN

Pindrajora is a village in the Chas CD block in the Chas subdivision of the Bokaro District, Jharkhand. The village is 15.0 km from Chas Bokaro, 20 km from Bokaro Steel City and 93 km far from Ranchi.

== Geography ==
Cities, towns and locations in Bokaro district in North Chotanagpur Division
M: municipal town, CT: census town, R: rural/ urban centre, F: Factory, A: Coal Mining Area
Abbreviation used: TPS – Thermal Power Station
Owing to space constraints in the small map, the actual locations in a larger map may vary slightly

=== Location ===
Pindrajora is located at 23.515556°N 86.202750°E.

=== Area overview ===
Bokaro district consists of undulating uplands on the Chota Nagpur Plateau with the Damodar River cutting a valley right across. It has an average elevation of 200 to 540 metres (660 to 1,770 ft) above mean sea level. The highest hill, Lugu Pahar, rises to a height of 1,070 metres (3,510 ft). The East Bokaro Coalfield located in the Bermo-Phusro area and small intrusions of Jharia Coalfield make Bokaro a coal rich district. In 1965, one of the largest steel manufacturing units in the country, Bokaro Steel Plant, operated by Steel Authority of India Limited, was set-up at Bokaro Steel City. The Damodar Valley Corporation established its first thermal power station at Bokaro (Thermal). The 5 kilometres (3.1 mi) long, 55 metres (180 ft) high earthfill dam with composite masonry cum concrete spillway, Tenughat Dam, across the Damodar River, is operated by the Government of Jharkhand. The average annual rainfall is 1,291.2 millimetres (50.83 in). The soil is generally infertile and agriculture is mostly rain-fed.

Note: The map alongside presents some of the notable locations in the district. All places marked in the map are linked in the larger full screen map.

== Civic administration ==
=== Police station ===
Pindrajora police station is located at Pindrajora.

== Educational institutions ==
- Crescent Public School
- Adarsh Vidya Mandir High School (AVM)
- St Mary Public School
- sardar Patel school CBSE affiliated school
- gurukula public school
- Adarsh Siksha Niketan

The village hosts the only training college for primary teachers in Dhanbad and Bokaro. The village has also a State Government Basic School and a Sarvodaya High School.

== Transport ==
NH 18 passes through Pindrajora.

== See also ==
- Gowai Baradge at Kendadih Village
- Sri Sri Kalika Maharani Temple
