= Bandhgora =

- Census Town
- Location in Jharkhand, India Bandhgora (India)
- Coordinates: 23.6256°N 86.1524°E
- Country: India
- State: Jharkhand
- District: Bokaro

Government
  - Body: Nagar Palika

Population (2011)
  - Total: 7,859

Languages (*For language details see Chas block#Language)
  - Official: Hindi, Urdu
- Time zone: UTC+5:30 (IST)
- PIN: 827013
- Telephone/STD code: 06542
- Vehicle registration: JH-09
- Lok Sabha constituency: Dhanbad
- Vidhan Sabha constituency: Bokaro
- Website: bokaro.nic.in

Bandhgora is a census town in the Chas CD block in the Chas subdivision of the Bokaro district in the state of Jharkhand, India.

== Geography ==
Cities, towns and locations in Bokaro district in North Chotanagpur Division
M: municipal town, CT: census town, R: rural/ urban centre, F: Factory, A: Coal Mining Area
Abbreviation used: TPS – Thermal Power Station
Owing to space constraints in the small map, the actual locations in a larger map may vary slightly

=== Location ===
Bandhgora is located at 23.6256°N 86.1524°E.

=== Area overview ===
Bokaro district consists of undulating uplands on the Chota Nagpur Plateau with the Damodar River cutting a valley right across. It has an average elevation of 200 to 540 metres (660 to 1,770 ft) above mean sea level. The highest hill, Lugu Pahar, rises to a height of 1,070 metres (3,510 ft). The East Bokaro Coalfield located in the Bermo-Phusro area and small intrusions of Jharia Coalfield make Bokaro a coal rich district. In 1965, one of the largest steel manufacturing units in the country, Bokaro Steel Plant, operated by Steel Authority of India Limited, was set-up at Bokaro Steel City. The Damodar Valley Corporation established its first thermal power station at Bokaro (Thermal). The 5 kilometres (3.1 mi) long, 55 metres (180 ft) high earthfill dam with composite masonry cum concrete spillway, Tenughat Dam, across the Damodar River, is operated by the Government of Jharkhand. The average annual rainfall is 1,291.2 millimetres (50.83 in). The soil is generally infertile and agriculture is mostly rain-fed.

Note: The map alongside presents some of the notable locations in the district. All places marked in the map are linked in the larger full screen map.

== Demographics ==
According to the 2011 Census of India, Bandhgora had a total population of 7,859, of which 4,107 (52%) were males and 3,752 (48%) were females. Population in the age range 0–6 years was 1,089. The total number of literate persons in Bandhgora was 5,041 (74.46% of the population over 6 years).

According to the 2011 Census of India, Bokaro Steel City Urban Agglomeration is composed of Bokaro Steel City (Census Town), Chas (Nagar Nigam) and Bandhgora (CT). Bokaro Steel City Urban Agglomeration had a total population of 563,417, of which males were 299,232 and females 264,185. The UA had an effective literacy rate (7+ population) of 84.87%, with male literacy of 92.27% and female literacy of 76.50%.

As of 2001 India census, Bandhgora had a population of 6,759. Males constitute 53% of the population and females 47%. Bandhgora has an average literacy rate of 53%, lower than the national average of 59.5%; with 69% of the males and 31% of females literate. 17% of the population is under 6 years of age.

== Infrastructure ==
According to the District Census Handbook 2011, Bokaro, Bandhgora covered an area of 4.15 km^{2}. Among the civic amenities, it had 10 km roads with both open and closed drains, the protected water supply handpump, uncovered well. It had 1,082 domestic electric connections. Among the medical facilities, it had 6 hospitals, 6 dispensaries, 6 health centres, 6 family welfare centres, 6 maternity and child welfare centres, 1 maternity home, 6 nursing homes, no medicine shop. Among the educational facilities it had 5 primary schools, 1 middle school, 1 secondary school, 1 senior secondary school, 1 general degree college. It had 1 non-formal educational centre (Sarva Siksha Abhiyan). Among the social, recreational and cultural facilities it had 20 auditorium/ community halls. Two important commodities it produced were electrical goods and coal. It had the branch offices of 1 cooperative bank, 1 agricultural credit society.
