= Chas, Bokaro =

Chas
- City and Neighbourhood of Bokaro
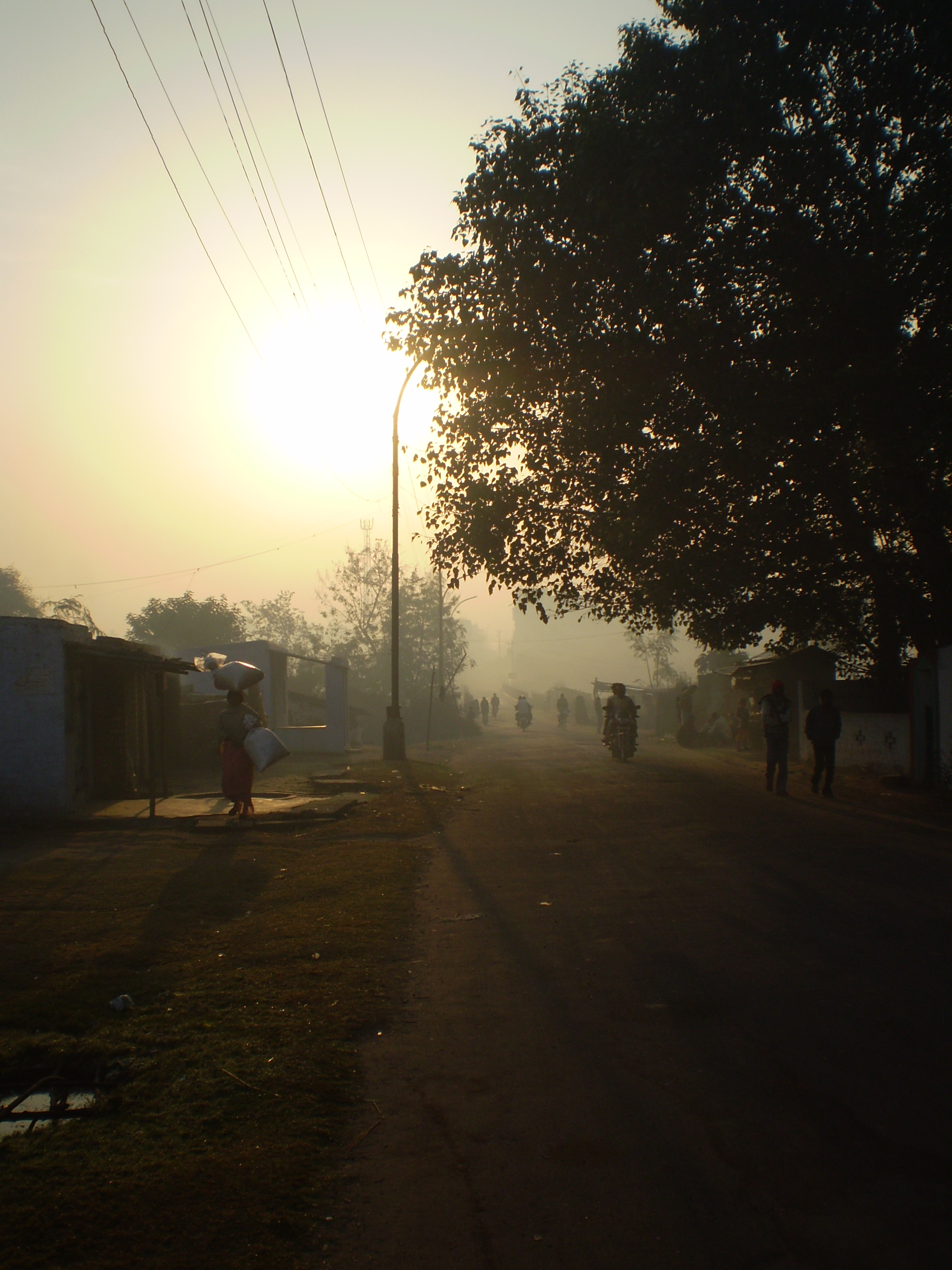
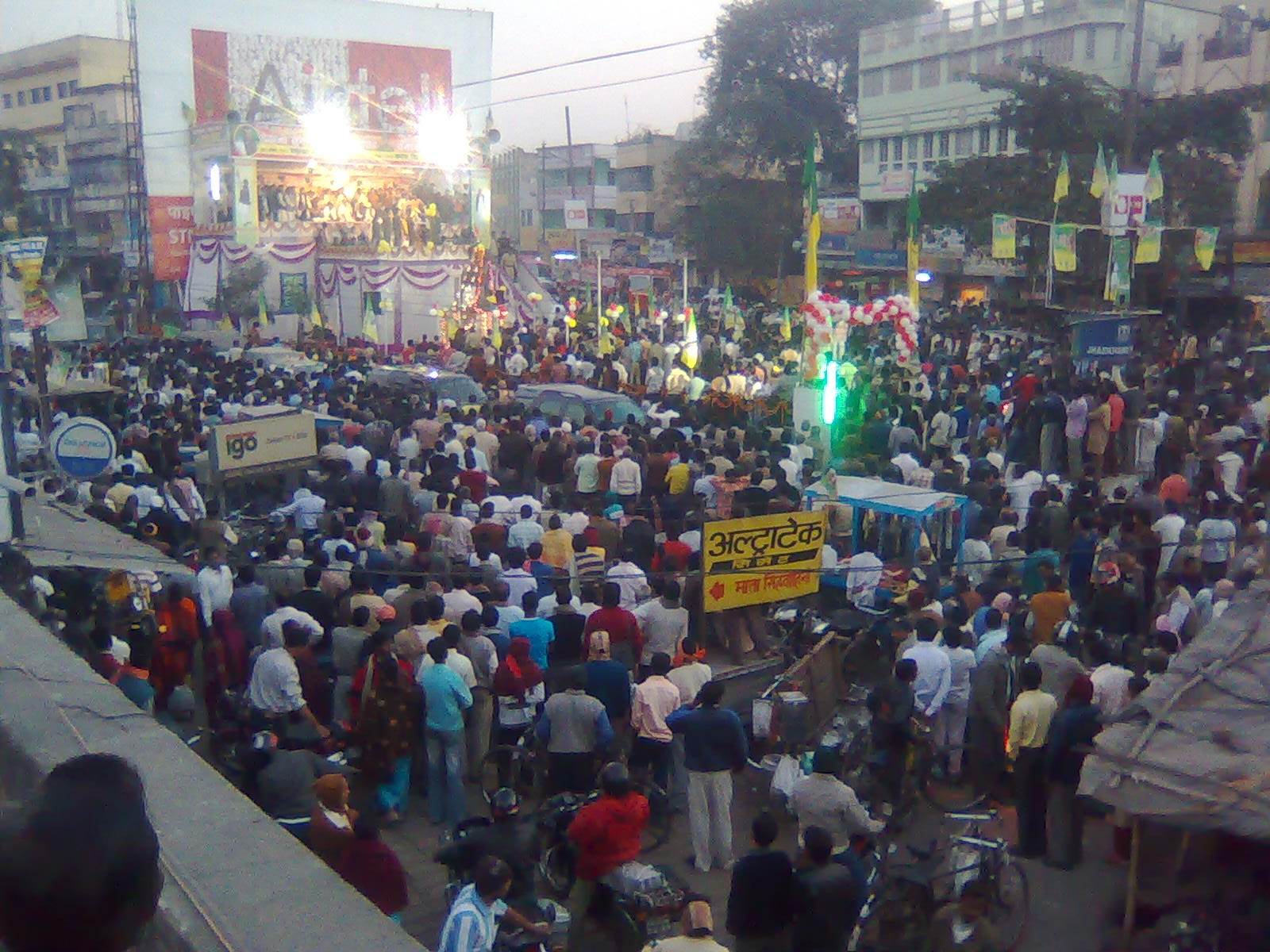
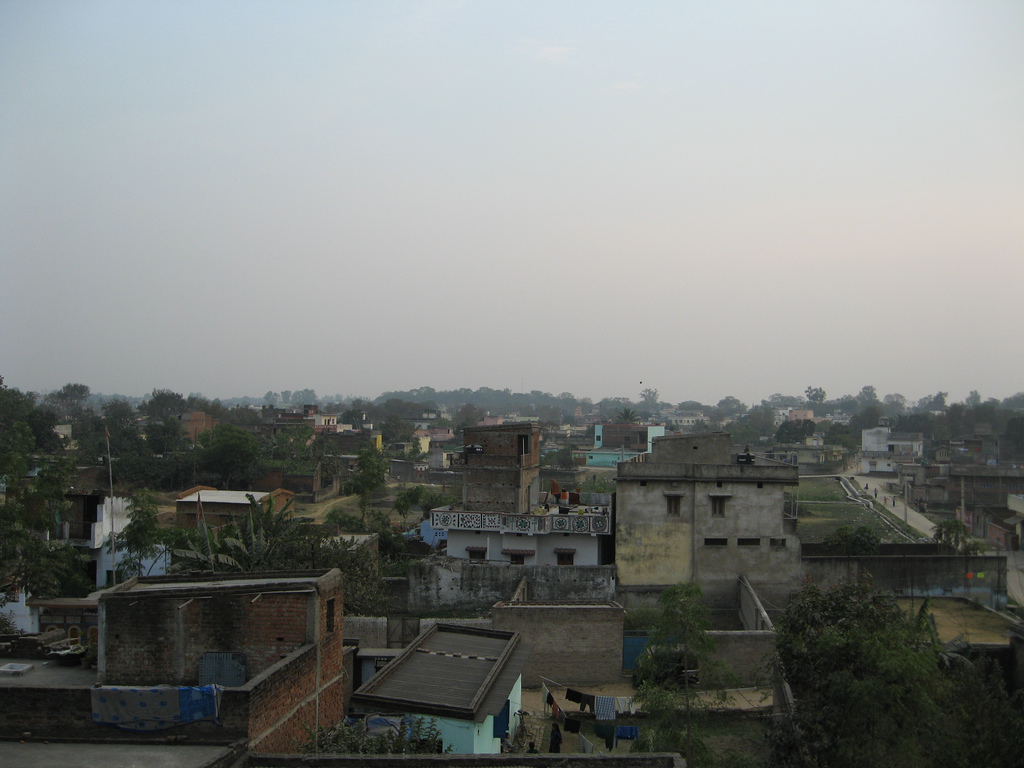
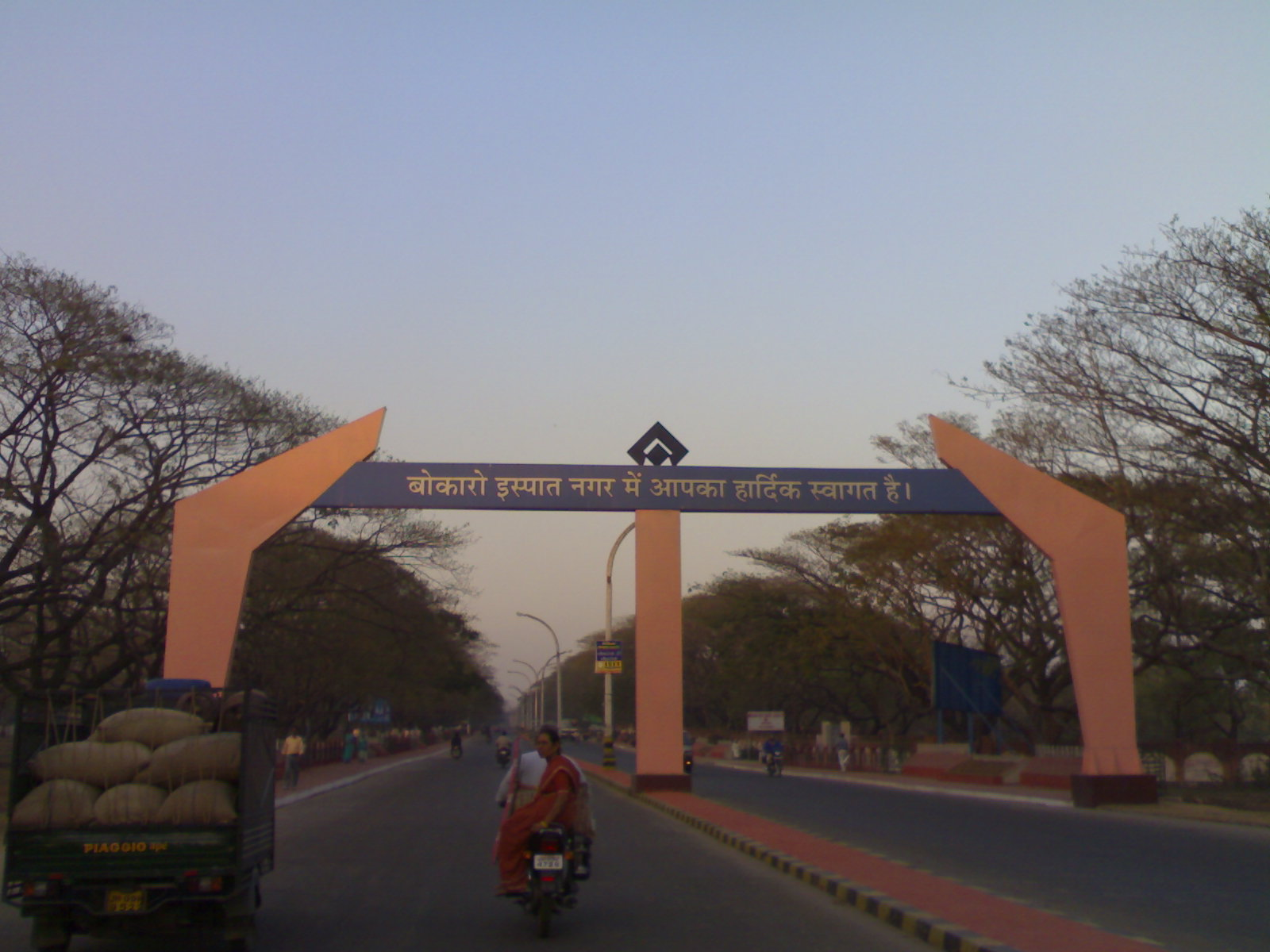
- Old Bridge, Main area, Chas, Kalika Temple, Chira Chas and Entry Point from Chas

- Location in Jharkhand, India Chas (India)
- Coordinates: 23.63°N 86.17°E
- Country: India
- State: Jharkhand
- District: Bokaro

Government
  - Type: Municipal governance in India
  - Body: Chas Municipal Corporation
  - Mayor: Bholu Paswan

Area
  - Total: 20.49 km^{2} (7.91 sq mi)
- Elevation: 210 m (690 ft)

Population (2011)
  - Total: 141,640
  - Density: 6,913/km^{2} (17,900/sq mi)

Languages (*For language details see Chas block#Language)
  - Official: Hindi, Urdu
  - Spoken: Khortha, Hindi
- Time zone: UTC+5:30 (IST)
- PIN: 827013
- Telephone code: 06542
- Vehicle registration: JH-09
- Lok Sabha constituency: Dhanbad
- Vidhan Sabha constituency: Bokaro
- Website: bokaro.nic.in/chas/

Chas (literally চাষ - खेती - Cultivation) is a Municipal Corporation in the Chas subdivision of the Bokaro district in the state of Jharkhand, India. It is often referred to as a suburb of Bokaro Steel City, though it predates the steel plant. Chas is one of the fastest-growing urban regions in Jharkhand and was ranked as the cleanest locality of Eastern India and the 19th cleanest locality of India in 2018, according to Swachh Survekshan.

== History ==
Once a small grain trading hub of the region, Chas became notable during the Second World War when the British government used it as a base to supply soldiers fighting in the eastern front against the Japanese. In the 1960s, the Government of India decided to establish the Bokaro Steel Plant nearby, which enhanced the economic activity of the region.

== Geography ==
Cities, towns and locations in Bokaro district in North Chotanagpur Division
M: municipal town, CT: census town, R: rural/ urban centre, F: Factory, A: Coal Mining Area
Abbreviation used: TPS – Thermal Power Station
Owing to space constraints in the small map, the actual locations in a larger map may vary slightly

=== Location ===
Chas is located at 23.63°N 86.17°E. It has an average elevation of 210 metres (688 feet). The municipality is situated on the banks of Garga river. Chas is located at the junction of National Highway 23 and National Highway 32. The Dhanbad-Bokaro-Ranchi Expressway also passes through it.

=== Area overview ===
Bokaro district consists of undulating uplands on the Chota Nagpur Plateau with the Damodar River cutting a valley right across. It has an average elevation of 200 to 540 metres (660 to 1,770 ft) above mean sea level. The highest hill, Lugu Pahar, rises to a height of 1,070 metres (3,510 ft). The East Bokaro Coalfield located in the Bermo-Phusro area and small intrusions of Jharia Coalfield make Bokaro a coal rich district. In 1965, one of the largest steel manufacturing units in the country, Bokaro Steel Plant, operated by Steel Authority of India Limited, was set-up at Bokaro Steel City. The Damodar Valley Corporation established its first thermal power station at Bokaro (Thermal). The 5 kilometres (3.1 mi) long, 55 metres (180 ft) high earthfill dam with composite masonry cum concrete spillway, Tenughat Dam, across the Damodar River, is operated by the Government of Jharkhand. The average annual rainfall is 1,291.2 millimetres (50.83 in). The soil is generally infertile and agriculture is mostly rain-fed.

Note: The map alongside presents some of the notable locations in the district. All places marked in the map are linked in the larger full screen map.

== Demographics ==
According to the 2011 Census of India, Chas (nagar parishad) had a total population of 141,640, of which 74,727 (53%) were males and 66,913 (47%) were females. Population in the age range 0–6 years was 18,340. The total number of literate persons in Chas was 103,167 (74.87% of the population over 6 years).

On 10 February 2015, Chas was accorded the status of Municipal Corporation, absorbing Kandra (CT) and Bandhgora (CT). This increased the town's population from 141,640 to 156,888.

=== Languages ===
Languages spoken in Chas City (2011)
1. Hindi 28.88 (25.7%)
2. Bengali 15.86 (14.1%)
3. khortha 15.49 (13.8%)
4. Bhojpuri 12.48 (11.1%)
5. Urdu 10.56 (9.39%)
6. Magadhi 9.83 (8.74%)
7. Others 19.38 (17.2%)

== Infrastructure ==
According to the District Census Handbook 2011, Bokaro, Chas (Nagar Parishad) covered an area of 20.49 km^{2}. Among the civic amenities, it had 105 km roads with both open and closed drains, the protected water supply involved handpump, tubewell/ borewell, overhead tank. It had 23,119 domestic electric connections, 1,824 road lighting points. Among the medical facilities, it had 2 hospitals, 5 dispensaries, 5 health centres, 2 family welfare centres, 9 maternity and child welfare centres, 9 maternity homes, 3 nursing homes, 32 medicine shops. Among the educational facilities it had 19 primary schools, 14 middle schools, 6 secondary schools, 4 senior secondary schools, 2 general degree colleges. It had 2 non-formal educational centres (Sarva Siksha Abhiyan). Among the social, recreational and cultural facilities it had 2 cinema theatres, 1 auditorium/ community hall, 1 public library, 1 reading room. Three important commodities it produced were iron and steel materials, salt, sweet. It had the branch offices of 13 nationalised banks, 3 private commercial banks, 1 agricultural credit society, 12 non-agricultural credit societies. There is also a railway station situated in the outskirts of the city.

== Economy ==
Iron and steel manufacturing play a key role in this region. Electrosteel Castings.Ltd (now Vedanta Resources), is one of the major iron and steel units established nearby. A rail wheel factory is also under development near Damoderpur village, about 35 kilometres from Bokaro, in a joint venture with Indian Railways and Govt. of Jharkhand .

Another major player in the local economy is the Bihar State Milk Co-operative Federation (Sudha Dairy), which has a processing plant at Sector-12.

Chas is especially well known for its wholesale markets. As such, the city is home to many small and medium-sized businesses, which are overseen by apex trade associations, like the Bokaro Chamber of Commerce and Industries, Jainamore Chamber of Commerce and Jharkhand Small Tiny Service Business Enterprises Association. In recent years, Chas has also had an influx of retail and supermarket chains and vehicle showrooms.

The area has attracted investment from a variety of industries. GAIL's Jagadishpur–Haldia–Bokaro-Dhamra Pipeline (JHBDPL), one of the largest gas pipeline projects of India, is expected to be completed in 2020 and will run through the area. In January 2020, Triveni Groups proposed the development of Kaushal Triveni Mega Food Park in nearby Chandankiyari. Finally, the real estate market in Chira Chas is booming, with hundreds of projects from Aashiyana Groups, Anand Vihar Constructions, Prapti Estate, Malti Infra Projects.

== Places of Interest ==
Chas has many natural, historical, and otherwise notable sites in and around the city. There include:

- The ruins of a historical terracotta temple in the Amdiha village in Chandankiyari, similar to Maluti temples of Dumka (Jharkhand).
- Hi-Tech Park, constructed under the Atal Mission for Rejuvenation and Urban Transformation (AMRUT) scheme and situated at ITI More, Garga Bridge, Bandhgora and Rajendra Nagar .
- Garga Dam at Garga river and Guwai Dam, located just outside the city. These are popular picnic sites among residents.
- Religious sites such as Sri Sri Kalika Maharani Temple at Chira Chas, Jagdamba Temple, Joda Temple, Bhootnath Temple, Jain Temple (at Gujarat Colony), Old Church (By-Pass Road), and Gurdwara Sri Guru Singh Sabha at NH-18. The Multiversity (Pupunki Ashram) at Pupunkighatbera is a centre of meditation and spiritual guidance.

== Education ==
Chas' primary and secondary schools include DPS (Chandankiyari Road), Sree Ayyappa Public School (Sec-5), Crescent Public School, BPS, Adarsh Vidya Mandir, Ramkrishna Vidya Mandir, Guru Gobind Singh Public School, Rainbow Public School, Ranvijay Smarak High School, Ram Rudra +2 High School etc.

There are also numerous schools and colleges in Chas offering post secondary courses, from the undergraduate to postgraduate level:

- Chas College, established in 1976
- Guru Gobind Singh Educational Society Technical Campus (GGESTC), the first engineering college of district, established in 2011.
- CMCE College
- Swami Sahjanand College
- Chas Mahila College
- Ranvijay Singh College, Sector 12 (Bokaro Steel City)
- Govt. Industrial Training Institute
- Asha ITI (a private ITI institute)

== Healthcare ==
Local medical facilities include :

- Meditrina Valour Hospital, a 100-bed cardiac care super-speciality hospital managed by Meditrina Group of Hospitals, Kollam (Kerala).
- K.M. Memorial Hospital & Research Centre (By-Pass Road)
- Muskan Hospital & Research Centre (Ramnagar Colony)
- Neelam Hospital (Jodhadih More)
- Sadar Hospital (Sector 1)
- Bokaro General Hospital, 900 bed multi-speciality PSU hospital at Bokaro Steel City.
