= Bhojudih =

- Census Town
- Location of Bhojudih in Jharkhand India Bhojudih (India)
- Coordinates: 23.644236°N 86.446323°E
- Country: India
- State: Jharkhand
- District: Bokaro

Area
  - Total: 3.28 km^{2} (1.27 sq mi)
- Elevation: 138 m (453 ft)

Population (2011)
  - Total: 7,005
  - Density: 2,140/km^{2} (5,530/sq mi)

Languages
  - Official: Hindi, Urdu
- Time zone: UTC+5:30 (IST)
- PIN: 828303
- Telephone/STD code: 0326
- Vehicle registration: JH 09
- Lok Sabha constituency: Dhanbad
- Vidhan Sabha constituency: Chandankiyari
- Website: bokaro.nic.in

Chattatand, Bhojudih is a census town in the Chandanakiyari CD block in the Chas subdivision of the Bokaro district in the state of Jharkhand, India.

== Geography ==
Cities, towns and locations in Bokaro district in North Chotanagpur Division
M: municipal town, CT: census town, R: rural/ urban centre, F: Factory, A: Coal Mining Area
Abbreviation used: TPS – Thermal Power Station
Owing to space constraints in the small map, the actual locations in a larger map may vary slightly

=== Location ===
Bhojudih is located at 23.644236°N 86.446323°E. It has an average elevation of 138 metres (452 feet).

=== Area overview ===
Bokaro district consists of undulating uplands on the Chota Nagpur Plateau with the Damodar River cutting a valley right across. It has an average elevation of 200 to 540 metres (660 to 1,770 ft) above mean sea level. The highest hill, Lugu Pahar, rises to a height of 1,070 metres (3,510 ft). The East Bokaro Coalfield located in the Bermo-Phusro area and small intrusions of Jharia Coalfield make Bokaro a coal rich district. In 1965, one of the largest steel manufacturing units in the country, Bokaro Steel Plant, operated by Steel Authority of India Limited, was set up at Bokaro Steel City. The Damodar Valley Corporation established its first thermal power station at Bokaro (Thermal). The 5 kilometres (3.1 mi) long, 55 metres (180 ft) high earthfill dam with composite masonry cum concrete spillway, Tenughat Dam, across the Damodar River, is operated by the Government of Jharkhand. The average annual rainfall is 1,291.2 millimetres (50.83 in). The soil is generally infertile and agriculture is mostly rain-fed.

Note: The map alongside presents some of the notable locations in the district. All places marked in the map are linked in the larger full screen map.

== Demographics ==
According to the 2011 Census of India, Bhojudih had a total population of 7,005, of which 3,699 (53%) were males and 3,306 (47%) were females. Population in the age range 0–6 years was 829. The total number of literate persons in Bhojudih was 4,624 (74.87% of the population over 6 years).

According to 2001 India census, Bhojudih has a population of 8,936. Males constitute 54% of the population and females 46%. Bhojudih has an average literacy rate of 64%, higher than the national average of 59.5%; with male literacy of 75% and female literacy of 51%. 12% of the population is under 6 years of age.

=== Languages ===
Languages spoken in Bhujodih Town (2011)
1. Hindi (39.6%)
2. Bengali (34.7%)
3. Khortha (10.7%)
4. Bhojpuri (3.54%)
5. Telugu (2.46%)
6. Urdu (0.89%)
7. Others (3.91%)

== Infrastructure ==
According to the District Census Handbook 2011, Bokaro, Bhojudih covered an area of 3.28 km^{2}.

== Economy ==
Collieries in the Lodna and Eastern Jharia Areas of BCCL
U: Underground colliery, O: Open Cast colliery, M: Mixed colliery, W: Washery, F: Facility, A: Administrative headquarters
Owing to space constraints in the small map, the actual locations in a larger map may vary slightly

=== Washery ===
Bhojudih Coal Washery of Bharat Coking Coal Limited has an annual capacity of washing 1.7 million tonnes of coking coal. It was established in 1962.

== Transport ==
Bhojudih railway station is on the Adra-Netaji SC Bose Gomoh branch line.
