= Kurpania =

- Census Town
- Location in Jharkhand, India Kurpania (India)
- Coordinates: 23.80°N 85.92°E
- Country: India
- State: Jharkhand
- District: Bokaro

Area
  - Total: 1.65 km^{2} (0.64 sq mi)

Population (2011)
  - Total: 7,789
  - Density: 4,720/km^{2} (12,200/sq mi)

Languages
  - Official: Hindi, Urdu
- Time zone: UTC+5:30 (IST)
- PIN: 829104
- Telephone/ STD code: 06549
- Vehicle registration: JH 09
- Lok Sabha constituency: Giridih
- Vidhan Sabha constituency: Bermo
- Website: bokaro.nic.in

Kurpania is a census town in the Bermo CD block in the Bermo subdivision of the Bokaro district in the Indian state of Jharkhand.

== Geography ==
Cities, towns and locations in Bokaro district in North Chotanagpur Division
M: municipal town, CT: census town, R: rural/ urban centre, F: Factory, A: Coal Mining Area
Abbreviation used: TPS – Thermal Power Station
Owing to space constraints in the small map, the actual locations in a larger map may vary slightly

=== Location ===
Kurpania is located at 23.80°N 85.92°E.

=== Area overview ===
Bokaro district consists of undulating uplands on the Chota Nagpur Plateau with the Damodar River cutting a valley right across. It has an average elevation of 200 to 540 metres (660 to 1,770 ft) above mean sea level. The highest hill, Lugu Pahar, rises to a height of 1,070 metres (3,510 ft). The East Bokaro Coalfield located in the Bermo-Phusro area and small intrusions of Jharia Coalfield make Bokaro a coal rich district. In 1965, one of the largest steel manufacturing units in the country, Bokaro Steel Plant, operated by Steel Authority of India Limited, was set-up at Bokaro Steel City. The Damodar Valley Corporation established its first thermal power station at Bokaro (Thermal). The 5 kilometres (3.1 mi) long, 55 metres (180 ft) high earthfill dam with composite masonry cum concrete spillway, Tenughat Dam, across the Damodar River, is operated by the Government of Jharkhand. The average annual rainfall is 1,291.2 millimetres (50.83 in). The soil is generally infertile and agriculture is mostly rain-fed.

Note: The map alongside presents some of the notable locations in the district. All places marked in the map are linked in the larger full screen map.

== Demographics ==
According to the 2011 Census of India, Kurpania had a total population of 7,789, of which 3,993 (51%) were males and 3,796 (49%) were females. Population in the age range 0–6 years was 1,020. The total number of literate persons in Kurpania was 5,689 (84.04% of the population over 6 years).

As per 2011 Census of India, Phusro Urban Agglomeration had a total population of 186,139, of which males were 97,665 and females 88,874. Phusro Urban Agglomeration is composed of Phusro (NP), Bermo (CT), Jaridih Bazar (CT), Bokaro (CT) and Kurpania (CT).

As of 2001 India census, Kurpania had a population of 7,440. Males constitute 54% of the population and females 46%. Kurpania has an average literacy rate of 67%, higher than the national average of 59.5%: male literacy is 75%, and female literacy is 59%. In Kurpania, 14% of the population is under 6 years of age.

== Infrastructure ==
According to the District Census Handbook 2011, Bokaro, Kurpania covered an area of 1.65 km^{2}. Among the civic amenities, it had 10 km roads with open drains, the protected water supply involved tap water from treated sources, uncovered well, overhead tank. It had 1,313 domestic electric connections, 150 road lighting points. Among the medical facilities, it had 2 hospitals, 1 dispensary, 1 health centre, 4 family welfare centres, 10 maternity and child welfare centres, 10 maternity homes, 10 nursing homes, 5 medicine shops. Among the educational facilities it had 2 primary schools, 1 middle school, 1 secondary school, 1 senior secondary school, the nearest general degree college at Jaridih Bazar 8 km away. Among the social, recreational and cultural facilities it had 1 cinema theatre, 8 auditorium/ community halls, 1 public library, 1 reading room. An important commodity it produced was coal. It had the branch office of 1 nationalised bank.
