= Chas subdivision =

- Subdivision
- Location in Jharkhand, India Chas subdivision (India)
- Coordinates: 23.63°N 86.17°E
- Country: India
- State: Jharkhand
- District: Bokaro
- Headquarters: Chas

Population
  - Total: 1,043,643

Languages
  - Official: Hindi, Urdu
- Time zone: UTC+5:30 (IST)
- Website: bokaro.nic.in

Chas subdivision is an administrative subdivision of the Bokaro district in the North Chotanagpur division in the state of Jharkhand, India.

== History ==
Bokaro district was created on 1 April 1991 by taking out Chas and Chandankiyari CD blocks of Dhanbad district and the entire Bermo subdivision of Giridih district and merging them. Earlier, Dhanbad district was created in 1956 by carving out the old Dhanbad subdivision and Chas and Chandankiyari police station areas of the Sadar subdivision of Manbhum district, on the recommendations of the States Reorganisation Commission.

== Administrative set up ==
Bokaro district has two subdivisions:

Subdivision	Headquarters	Area km^{2}	Population (2011)	Rural population % (2011)	Urban population % (2011)
Bermo	Tenughat	n/a	1,018,690	59.98	40.02
Chas	Chas	n/a	1,043,640	44.81	55.19
Bokaro district	Bokaro Steel City	2,883	2,062,330	52.30	47.70

Cities, towns and locations in Bokaro district in North Chotanagpur Division
M: municipal town, CT: census town, R: rural/ urban centre, F: Factory, A: Coal Mining Area
Abbreviation used: TPS – Thermal Power Station
Owing to space constraints in the small map, the actual locations in a larger map may vary slightly

=== Urban frame ===
Chas is the only statutory town in Chas subdivision. It has 4 census towns: Bokaro Steel City, Bandhgora, Amlabad and Bhojudih.

=== Rural frame ===
There are 248 inhabited villages in Chas subdivision.

== Police stations ==
Police stations in Chas subdivision were at:

1. Balidih
2. Chandankiyari
3. Chas (M)
4. Gandhinagar
5. Harla
6. Mahila
7. Maraphari
8. Penk Narayanpur
9. SC/ST
10. Sector IV
11. Sector VI
12. Sector XII
13. Siyaljori

== Blocks ==
Community development blocks in Bermo subdivision are

CD block	Headquarters	Area km^{2}	Population (2011)	SC %	ST %	Literacy rate %	Census towns
Chas	Chas	553.19	671,672	14.44	9.59	66.61	Bokaro Steel City, Bandh Dih
Chandankiyari	Chandankiyari	370.51	230,238	25.28	8.24	53.61	Amlabad, Bhojudih

== Economy ==
=== Bokaro Steel Plant ===
Bokaro Steel Plant is one of the largest steel producing units in the country with an annual capacity of 5.8 MT of liquid steel. It was incorporated as a limited company in 1965. It was later merged with the state-owned Steel Authority of India Limited (SAIL).

=== Vedanta Limited ===
Electrosteel Steels Limited, whose initial promoters were the Kolkata-based Kejriwal family of the Electrosteel Group, whose flagship is the ductile iron pipe pioneers, Electrosteel Castings, was setting up a 2.51 million tonnes per annum integrated steel plant at Sialjory. The company had acquired 1,723.44 hectares of land for the plant. Vedanta Limited acquired control of Electrosteels Steels Limited in 2018.

=== Collieries ===
Amlabad colliery of Eastern Jharia Area of BCCL is a Amlabad.

Bhojudih Coal Washery of BCCL is at Bhojudih.

== Education ==
In 2011, in Chas subdivision out of a total 248 inhabited villages there were 54 villages with pre-primary schools, 233 villages with primary schools, 133 villages with middle schools, 34 villages with secondary schools, 10 villages with senior secondary schools, 1 location with general degree college, 4 locations with non-formal training centres, 2 locations with vocational training institutes, 12 villages with no educational facility.
.*Senior secondary schools are also known as Inter colleges in Jharkhand

=== Educational institutions ===
The following institutions are located in Chas subdivision:

- Chas College, established in 1976, at Chas.
- Guru Gobind Singh Educational Society Technical Campus (GGESTC), established in 2011, at Bokaro Steel City.
- CMCE College, established in 1995, at Chira Chas.
- Swami Sahjanand College, established in 1984, at Chas.
- Chas Mahila College, at Chas.
- Ran Vijay Smarak Mahavidyalaya, established in 1982 at Bokaro Steel City.
- BB Amina Women's College at Bokaro(?),
- Bokaro Steel City College, established in 1970, at Bokaro Steel City.
- Immanuel Hai Khan Law College at Bokaro(?).

(Information about degree colleges with proper reference may be added here)

== Healthcare ==
In 2011, in Chas subdivision there were 5 villages with primary health centres, 26 villages with primary health subcentres, 3 villages with maternity and child welfare centres, 6 villages with allopathic hospitals, 9 villages with dispensaries, 2 villages with family welfare centres, 45 villages with medicine shops.
.*Private medical practitioners, alternative medicine etc. not included

=== Medical facilities ===
(Anybody having referenced information about location of government/ private medical facilities may please add it here)
