= National Highway 320 (India) =

National highway in India

National Highway 320
- Map of National Highway 320 in red

Route information
- Auxiliary route of NH 20
- Length: 93 km (58 mi)

Major junctions
- From: Ormanjhi near Ranchi
- To: Chas, Bokaro

Location
- Country: India
- States: Jharkhand

Highway system
- Roads in India; Expressways; National; State; Asian
← NH 20	→ NH 18

National Highway 320 (NH 320) is a National Highway in India. This runs entirely in the state of Jharkhand connecting capital Ranchi with Chas near Bokaro . One part of this NH320 traverses to NH14 at Mejia in West Bengal via Chandankiyari, Raghunathpur & Saltora as National Highway 320A (NH320A). It is commonly known as Chas-Raghunathpur-Mejia Road or Chas Road & covers 101 kilometres (63 mi) distance. Another part of this NH320 traverses from Ranchi connecting Kanke, Patratu, Bhurkunda, Ramgarh, Gola, Saragdih & ends at Jhalida in West Bengal as National Highway 320B (NH320B). It is commonly known as Ranchi-Patratu-Ramgarh Road between Ranchi & Ramgarh & Ramgarh-Gola-Jhalida Road or Gola Road between Ramgarh & Jhalida & covers 127 kilometres (79 mi) distance.
