= Chalkari Basti =

- village
- Location in Jharkhand, India Chalkari Basti (India)
- Coordinates: 23.758°N 85.954°E
- Country: India
- State: Jharkhand
- District: Bokaro

Languages
  - Official: Hindi, Urdukhortha, Bengali
- Time zone: UTC+5:30 (IST)
- Postal code: 829114
- Vehicle registration: JH
- Nearest city: Phusro
- Lok Sabha constituency: Giridih

Chalkari Basti is a village situated in the Bokaro district of Jharkhand, India. It is surrounded by "Damodar River" by East, West and North. This village is well connected by road as well as railway (2 km from Bermo Railway Station). This village is divided into two panchayats – south and north. The mukhiya of north panchayat is Ankleshwar Thakur.

== Education ==
Mainly peoples of Chalkari Basti are educated. A Government Middle school and High school is situated in Chalkari Basti and Sarswati shishu mandir is also situated in this village.

== Facts ==
In Chalkari Basti, Hindus and Muslims live together. All basic primary needs are available in Chalkari Basti.

== Place to visit ==
The Shiv mandir compound in Chalkari is an attraction place. With temples surrounding the place and a Peepal tree and a Banyan tree, it sets a holistic environment.
