= Chandankiyari (community development block) =

- Community development block
- Location in Jharkhand, India Chandankiyari (India)
- Coordinates: 23.5761023°N 86.3508224°E
- Country: India
- State: Jharkhand
- District: Bokaro

Government
  - Type: Representative democracy

Area
  - Total: 374.74 km^{2} (144.69 sq mi)

Population (2011)
  - Total: 230,238
  - Density: 614.39/km^{2} (1,591.3/sq mi)

Languages
  - Official: Hindi, Urdu

Literacy (2011)
  - Total literates: 123,422 (63.65%)
- Time zone: UTC+5:30 (IST)
- PIN: 828134 (Chandankiyari)
- Telephone/STD code: 0326
- Vehicle registration: JH 09
- Lok Sabha constituency: Dhanbad
- Vidhan Sabha constituency: Chandankiyari
- Website: bokaro.nic.in

Chandankiyari is a community development block that forms an administrative division in the Chas subdivision of the Bokaro district in the Indian state of Jharkhand.

== Overview ==
Bokaro district, a part of the Chota Nagpur Plateau, has undulating surface with the altitude varying between 200 and 282 m. Topographically, the entire area is divided into three parts – the Bokaro uplands in the west, the Bokaro-Chas uplands in the middle and Barakar basin in the east. The general slope of the region is from the west to the east. The main rivers are the Damodar, Garga, Parga, Konar and Gobei. The district, covered with hills and forests, is a mining-industrial area. With the construction of the gigantic Bokaro Steel Plant in the nineteen sixties, it has become the focal point of this district.

== Maoist activities ==
Jharkhand is one of the states affected by Maoist activities. As of 2012, Bokaro was one of the 14 highly affected districts in the state.As of 2016, Bokaro was identified as one of the 13 focus areas by the state police to check Maoist activities.

== Geography ==
Chandankiyari is located at 23°34′34″N 86°21′03″E.

Chandankiyari CD block is bounded by Dhanbad and Jharia CD blocks, in Dhanbad district, on the north, Para and Purulia II CD blocks, in Purulia district of West Bengal, on the east, Purulia I CD block, in Purulia district, on the south, and Chas CD block on the west.

Chandankiyari CD block has an area of 374.74 km^{2}. It has 54 gram panchayats, 128 villages and 2 census towns. Chandankiyari and Siyaljori police stations are located in this CD Block. Headquarters of this CD Block is at Chandankiyari.

Chandankiyari is an intermediate panchayat under Bokaro Zilla panchayat. Village panchayats part of Chandankiyari intermediate panchayat are: Aadrkuri, Amainagar, Amlabad, Arita, Bagula, Barajor, Bastora, Batbinor, Bhojudih East, Bhojudih West, Boriyadih, Chandra, Chankiyari E, Chankiyari W, Damudih, Devgram, Fasro, Gamhariya, Jhalbarda, Kalikapur, Khirabera, Kumirdowa, Kusumkiyari, Laghla, Lalpur, Lanka, Madhra, Mahal East, Mahal West, Nawadiha, Nayawan, Polkari, Sabra, Saharjori, Silfor, Simuliya, Siyaljori, Shiv Babudih, Silfor, Simuliya, and Siyaljori

== Demographics ==
=== Population ===
According to the 2011 Census of India, Chandankiyari CD block had a total population of 230,238, of which 218,597 were rural and 11,641 were urban. There were 119,606 (52%) males and 110,632 (48%) females. Population in the age range 0-6 years was 36,317. Scheduled Castes numbered 58,208 (25.28%) and Scheduled Tribes numbered 18,971 (8.24%).

Chandankiyari CD block has two census towns (2011 population figure in brackets): Amlabad (4,636) and Bhojudih (7,005).

Large villages (with 4,000+ population) in Chandankiyari CD block are (2011 census figures in brackets): Adarkurni (4,889), Jhalbarda (6,375), Arita (4,723), Nadiha (6,172), Kumirdoba (4,035), Chandra (7,174), Silajuri (4,954), Mahal (9,304), Laghla (4,375) and Chandankiyari (9,386).

=== Literacy ===
As of 2011 census the total number of literate persons in Chandankiyari CD block was 123,422 (63.65% of the population over 6 years) out of which males numbered 78,239 (77.45% of the male population over 6 years) and females numbered 45,181 (48.63% of the female population over 6 years). The gender disparity (the difference between female and male literacy rates) was 28.82%.

As of 2011 census, literacy in Bokaro district was 73.48% , Literacy in Jharkhand was 66.41% in 2011. Literacy in India in 2011 was 74.04%.

See also – List of Jharkhand districts ranked by literacy rate

Literacy in CD Blocks of
Bokaro district
Bermo subdivision
Nawadih – 62.55%
Chandrapura – 75.41%
Bermo – 79.04%
Gomia – 65.40%
Petarwar – 62.33%
Kasmar – 65.33%
Jaridih – 68.94%
Chas subdivision
Chas – 77.14%
Chandankiyari – 63.65%
Source: 2011 Census: CD Block Wise
Primary Census Abstract Data

=== Language ===
Hindi is the official language in Jharkhand and Urdu has been declared as an additional official language. Jharkhand legislature had passed a bill according the status of a second official language to several languages in 2011 but the same was turned down by the Governor.

In the 2001 census, the three most populous mother tongues (spoken language/ medium of communication between a mother and her children) in Bokaro district were (with percentage of total population in brackets): Khortha (41.08%), Hindi (17.05%) and Santali (10.78%). In the 2011 census, scheduled tribes constituted 12.40% of the total population of the district. The five most populous mother tongues were (with percentage of ST population in brackets): Santali (70.12%), Munda (17.05%), Oraon (5.90%), Karmali (4.23%) and Mahli (3.23%).

== Economy ==
=== Livelihood ===
Livelihood
in Chandankiyari CD block
1. Cultivators (23.4%)
2. Agricultural labourers (35.8%)
3. Household industries (3.73%)
4. Other Workers (37.1%)

In Chandankiyari CD block in 2011, amongst the class of total workers, cultivators numbered 20,286 and formed 23.41%, agricultural labourers numbered 31,010 and formed 35.78%, household industry workers numbered 3,236 and formed 3.73% and other workers numbered 32,134 and formed 37.08%. Total workers numbered 235,497 and formed 28.95% of the total population, and non-workers numbered 577,905 and formed 71.05% of the population.

Note: In the census records a person is considered a cultivator, if the person is engaged in cultivation/ supervision of land owned. When a person who works on another person's land for wages in cash or kind or share, is regarded as an agricultural labourer. Household industry is defined as an industry conducted by one or more members of the family within the household or village, and one that does not qualify for registration as a factory under the Factories Act. Other workers are persons engaged in some economic activity other than cultivators, agricultural labourers and household workers. It includes factory, mining, plantation, transport and office workers, those engaged in business and commerce, teachers, entertainment artistes and so on.

=== Infrastructure ===
There are 122 inhabited villages in Chandankiyari CD block. In 2011, 71 villages had power supply. 22 villages had tap water (treated/ untreated), 119 villages had well water (covered/ uncovered), 117 villages had hand pumps, and all villages had drinking water facility. 13 villages had post offices, 12 villages had sub post offices, 2 village had telephone (land line) and 57 villages had mobile phone coverage. 121 villages had pucca (hard top) village roads, 18 villages had bus service (public/ private), 4 villages had autos/ modified autos, and 62 villages had tractors. 4 villages had banks branches, 1 village had an agricultural credit society, no village had cinema/ video hall, 1 village had a public library and public reading room. 70 villages had public distribution system, 22 villages had weekly haat (market) and 58 villages had assembly polling stations.

=== Agriculture ===
The average annual rainfall in Bokaro district is 1291.2 mm. The soil is generally laterite and sandy. 39.21% of the total area is under agriculture. It is generally a single monsoon-dependent crop. 9.90% of the cultivable land is under horticulture. Rice and maize are the main crops. Bajara, wheat, pulses and vegetables are also grown.

=== Backward Regions Grant Fund ===
Bokaro district is listed as a backward region and receives financial support from the Backward Regions Grant Fund. The fund created by the Government of India is designed to redress regional imbalances in development. As of 2012, 272 districts across the country were listed under this scheme. The list includes 21 districts of Jharkhand.

== Education ==
In 2011, amongst the 122 inhabited villages in Chandankiyari CD block, 8 villages had no primary school, 82 villages had one primary school and 32 villages had more than one primary school. 69 villages had at least one primary school and one middle school. 13 villages had at least one middle school and one secondary school. Chandankiyari CD block had 3 senior secondary schools.

== Healthcare ==
In 2011, amongst the 122 inhabited villages in Chandankiyari CD block, 1 village had primary health centre, 10 villages had primary health sub-centres, 1 village had maternity and child welfare centre, 1 village had TB clinic, 4 villages had allopathic hospitals, 7 villages had dispensaries, 9 villages had medicine shops and 95 villages had no medical facilities.
