= 1965 Dhanbad coal mine disaster =

Explosion in a coal mine near Dhanbad, India

Coordinates: 23.8°N 86.45°E

The 1965 Dhanbad coal mine disaster occurred on 28 May 1965, in a coal mine near Dhanbad, India. An explosion occurred in Dhori colliery near Dhanbad, which led to fire in the mine. The fire killed 268 miners. Dhori colliery is located near Bermo. The mine was at the time owned by the Raja of Ramgarh.
