= Pupunki =

- Village
- Location in Jharkhand, India Pupunki (India)
- Coordinates: 23.706938°N 86.204198°E
- Country: India
- State: Jharkhand
- District: Bokaro

Languages
  - Official: Hindi, Khortha
- Time zone: UTC+5:30 (IST)
- PIN: 827013
- Vehicle registration: JH09
- Chas: Bokaro Steel City
- Lok Sabha constituency: Dhanbad

Pupunki is a village in Jharkhand state, India, located on the banks of the Damodar River, which separates the Dhanbad and Bokaro districts. National Highway 32 passes through the village, connecting it directly to Dhanbad and Bokaro, making the village easily accessible by road. Pupunki has a moderately sized population of around 6,000.

The village notably houses a full-service SBI branch, which is uncommon for Indian villages. Pupunki is also home to the renowned Pupunki Ashram, established by Hindu monk Swami Ji.
