= Bhowrah =

- Neighbourhood in Dhanbad
- Location within Jharkhand Location within India
- Coordinates: 23.685°N 86.398°E
- Country: India
- State: Jharkhand
- District: Dhanbad
- Elevation: 153 m (502 ft)

Population (2001)
  - Total: 44,654

Languages
  - Official: Hindi, Urdu
- Time zone: UTC+5:30 (IST)
- PIN: 828302
- Vehicle registration: JH
- Website: dhanbad.nic.in

Bhowrah (also spelt as Bhowra) is a neighbourhood in Dhanbad in Dhanbad Sadar subdivision of Dhanbad district in Jharkhand state, India.

== Geography ==
Cities, towns and locations in the southern portion of Dhanbad Sadar subdivision in Dhanbad district
MC: Municipal Corporation, CT: Census Town, N: Neighbourhood, R: Rural/ Urban centre
Owing to space constraints in the small map, the actual locations in a larger map may vary slightly

=== Location ===
Bhowrah is located at 23.685°N 86.398°E.

Note: The map alongside presents some of the notable locations in the area. All places marked in the map are linked in the larger full screen map.

The earlier census town was combined with other urban units to form Dhanbad Municipal Corporation in 2006.

Bhowrah is part of Ward No. 41 of Dhanbad Municipal Corporation.

Famous anchor, photographer and Founder of Techno world, Shivam Banerjee belongs from Bhowrah. Anurag Kashyap, Editor in Chief of Prabhat khabar also belongs from here..

Bhowrah is surrounded by many coalmines

=== Overview ===
The region shown in the map is a part of the undulating uplands bustling with coalmines. The Damodar River, the most important river of the Chota Nagpur Plateau, flows along the southern border. A major part of the area shown in the map is part of Dhanbad Municipal Corporation, an urban area. The places in the DMC area are marked as neighbourhoods. The western part of the region shown in the map is covered by Dhanbad (community development block). 57% of the population of Dhanbad CD block reside in rural areas and 43% reside in urban areas, The east-central part of the region shown in the map is covered by Baliapur (community development block). 86% of the population of Baliapur CD block reside in rural areas and 14% reside in urban areas. The places in the CD block areas are marked mostly as census towns. Three operational areas of BCCL operate fully within the region – Pootkee Balihari Area, Lodna Area and Eastern Jharia Area. The Moonidih sector of Western Jharia Area also operates in the region.

== Demographics ==
As of 2001 India census, Bhowrah had a population of 44,253. Males constitute 54% of the population and females 46%. Bhowrah has an average literacy rate of 65%, lower than the national average of 74.5%; with male literacy of 74% and female literacy of 54%. 13% of the population is under 6 years of age.

== Economy ==
Collieries functioning in the Eastern Jharia Area of BCCL are: Bhowrah North, Bhowrah South, Bhowrah (OC 3 Pit), Amlabad, Sudamdih Incline, Sudamdih Shafts, Pathardih and C.O.C.R.

== Transport ==
There is a station at Bhowrah on the Gomoh-Adra line.

== Healthcare ==
BCCL has a 10-bedded hospital at Bhowrah. It caters to the needs of employees and their families, as well as outsiders as part of BCCL's corporate social responsibility programme. BCCL has a 100-bedded regional hospital at Jealgora in the same area.
