= Dhori Area =

- Location in Jharkhand Dhori Area (India)
- Location: East Bokaro Coalfield; 23.766978°N 85.985389°E
- Company: Central Coalfields Limited
- Website: centralcoalfields.in/cmpny/hstry.php

Dhori Area is one of the operational areas of the Central Coalfields Limited located mainly in the Bokaro district in the state of Jharkhand, India.

The projects of the Dhori Area are Amlo opencast, Dhori open cast, Selected Dhori Quarry No. I open cast, Selected Dhori Quarry No. III open cast, New Selected Dhori underground, and Dhori Khas underground. The area office is at Dhori, PO Dhori 825102.

== Mining activity ==
Collieries in the CCL Bokaro and Kargali Area and CCL Dhori Area (both in East Bokaro Coalfield)
U: Underground colliery, O: Open cast colliery, M: Mixed colliery, W: Washery, S: F: Facility, A: Administrative headquarters
Owing to space constraints in the small map, the actual locations in a larger map may vary slightly.
Cities, towns and locations in Bokaro district in North Chotanagpur Division
M: Municipal town, CT: Census town, R: Rural/urban centre, F: Factory, A: Coal mining area, TPS: Thermal power station
Owing to space constraints in the small map, the actual locations in a larger map may vary slightly.

=== Mines and projects ===
Amlo Open Cast Project has an annual capacity of 3.0 million tonnes per year.

Selected Dhori Group of Mines: The mine is operational and proposed for production capacity expansion from 2.25 million tonnes per year to 8.25 million tonnes per year (nominal) and 11.0 million tonnes per year (peak).

== Dhori colliery accident ==
See also: 1965 Dhanbad coal mine disaster

One of the biggest disasters in the history of coal mining took place at Dhori colliery at about 1 AM on 28 May 1965. The death of 268 persons in the accident is the highest number of deaths in an explosion in India.

Dhori colliery in the East Bokaro Coalfield was owned, at the time of accident, by Bokaro and Ramgarh Limited. Amlo, Upper Kargali, Lower Kargali, Bermo and Karo group of seams (including Phusro seam) were present in Dhori colliery. At the time of accident, only the Bermo seam was being worked. Although the Upper Kargali seam was known to be a gassy seam, the colliery as a whole was treated as non-gassy. Hurricane lanterns were used in the mine and it did not have any mechanical ventilation.

There were alternative theories about the cause of the accident. The Court of Enquiry accepted the proposition that the accident was caused by the entry of a coal miner carrying a lantern into a gassy zone. The management theory of a sabotage was not accepted by the court. The observations and strictures of the Court of Enquiry led to long standing changes in mining practices that have made mines safer.

== Educational facilities for employees’ children ==
Central Coalfields Limited provides support for reputed institutions and trusts for setting up 10+2 pattern CBSE schools for children of CCL employees. It provides 109 buses to take employees' children to schools and back. Among the schools in the East Bokaro Coalfield that receive financial help or structural support are DAV Dhori, DAV Swang, and DAV Kathara.

== Medical facilities ==
In the East Bokaro Coalfield, CCL has the following facilities:

Central Hospital Dhori at Dhori, with 50 beds, has seven general duty medical officers and three specialists. Its facilities include audiometer, spirometer, and ICU. It has four ambulances.

Regional Hospital at Kargali, with 60 beds, has three general duty medical officers and three specialists. Its facilities include surgical and eye equipment. It has two ambulances.

Bokaro Colliery Hospital at Bermo, with 48 beds, has two general duty medical officers. It has facilities for routine tests.

Kathara Hospital at Kathara, with 35 beds, has four general duty medical officers. Its facilities include X‐ray, ECG, and auto analyser. It has two ambulances.

Swang Hospital at Swang functions with 11 beds.

Jarangdih Hospital at Jaragdih functions with 11 beds.

There are central facilities in the Central Hospital, Gandhinagar at Kanke Road, Ranchi with 250 beds, and in the Central Hospital, Naisarai at Ramgarh with 150 beds.

There are dispensaries at Gobindpur in the Kathara Area, Karo I/Jawahar Nagar, AAK OCP/KMP in the Bokaro & Kargali Area, and Central Colony and Kalyani in the Dhori Area.
