= Bokaro and Kargali Area =

- Location in Jharkhand Location in India
- Location: East Bokaro Coalfield, Giridih Coalfield; 23.768878°N 85.971589°E
- Company: Central Coalfields Limited
- Website: centralcoalfields.in/cmpny/hstry.php

Bokaro and Kargali Area is one of the operational areas of the Central Coalfields Limited located mainly in the Bokaro district and partly in the Giridih district, both in the state of Jharkhand, India.

The projects of Bokaro and Kargali Area are Bokaro open cast, Kargali open cast, Kargali underground, Karo open cast, Karo underground, Khas Mahal open cast, Khas Mahal underground, Karo Special underground, Giridih open cast, Kabribad open cast, and Kargali washery. The area office is at Kargali, PO Bermo 829104.

== Mining activity ==
Collieries in the Bokaro and Kargali Area of CCL (Giridih Coalfield)
U: Underground colliery, O: Open cast colliery, M: Mixed colliery, W: Washery, S: F: Facility, A: Administrative headquarters
Owing to space constraints in the small map, the actual locations in a larger map may vary slightly.
Collieries in the CCL Bokaro and Kargali Area and CCL Dhori Area (both in East Bokaro Coalfield)
U: Underground colliery, O: Open cast colliery, M: Mixed colliery, W: Washery, S: F: Facility, A: Administrative headquarters
Owing to space constraints in the small map, the actual locations in a larger map may vary slightly.
Cities, towns and locations in Bokaro district in North Chotanagpur Division
M: Municipal town, CT: Census town, R: Rural/urban centre, F: Factory, A: Coal mining area, TPS: Thermal power station
Owing to space constraints in the small map, the actual locations in a larger map may vary slightly.

=== Mines and projects ===
Bokaro opencast project, designed in 2013–14 for a rated annual capacity of 0.7 million tonnes, is located in the East Bokaro Coalfield, north of the Damodar River.

Kargali colliery is a very old colliery, started in 1918 as an underground mine by the Great Indian Peninsular Railway. Kargali OCP is north of the Gomoh-Barkakana branch line and is 1.5 km from Bermo railway station. As of 2014, it had a mineable reserve of 33.93 million tonnes and corresponding overburden volume of 0.50 million cubic metres. The project had an estimated life of 49 years. It operates in the Kargali seam.

In Kargali underground colliery, the Bermo seam incline is located on the northern side of the Gomoh-Barkakana branch line in the East Bokaro Coalfield, west of Dhori colliery, and developmental work was initiated in 1983. In 2013–14, it had a production target of 35,000 tonnes. Total mineable reserve was 7.2 million tonnes. The project had an estimated life of 50 years.

Khasmahal Opencast Project is located at Khasmahal, PO Sunday Bazar, Bokaro district. It is on the north bank of the Konar River in the East Bokaro Coalfield. It lies north-west of Bokaro colliery. Khasmahal OCP has a designed rated capacity of 1.5 million tonnes of coal per year, total mineable reserve of 20.40 million tonnes, and an expected life of 35 years, as of 2013–2014.

Konar Opencast Project is located at Konar, PO Sunday Bazar, Bokaro district. It is on the north bank of the Konar River in the East Bokaro Coalfield. Coal mining is the prime activity in the region and both Bokaro colliery and Khasmahal OCP operate nearby. The Gomoh-Barkakana branch line separates the Konar OCP from Boakro and DVC mines. Konar OCP has a designed rated capacity of 3.5 million tonnes per annum, a mineable reserve of 74.53 million tonnes, and an expected life of around 28 years, as of 2013–14.

Kabribad Re-organised Mine is one of the two working mines in Giridih Coalfield. Mining activities were started at Giridih in 1871 by Bengal Coal Company, taken over by East Indian Railways in 1896, and subsequently the ownership was transferred to NCDC in 1956 and Coal India in 1975. The Kabribad sector has been mined from pre-independence days, initially as an underground mine and more recently as an opencast mine. There is a dyke across the coal seam worked. On one side of the dyke coal is almost exhausted. A small short-term quarry was proposed on the other side of the dyke. The cumulative mining reserve is 3.60 million tonnes.

The proposed Karo expansion open cast project envisaged an enhanced mine capacity of 6 million tonnes for the Karo block and 5 million tonnes for the Kaveri block. Karo OCP is located in the East Bokaro Coalfield. The Kaveri block is about 5 km from Bermo railway station on the Gomoh Barkakana branch line. It has a total mineable reserve of 105.17 million tonnes.

Kargali Washery, commissioned in 1958, has a production capacity of 2.72 million tonnes per year of ROM coal. It has undergone technological upgradation to supply medium washed coking coal.

== Educational facilities for employees’ children ==
Central Coalfields Limited provides support for reputed institutions and trusts for setting up 10+2 pattern CBSE schools for children of CCL employees. It provides 109 buses to take employees' children to schools and back. Among the schools in the East Bokaro Coalfield that receive financial help or structural support are DAV Dhori, DAV Swang, and DAV Kathara.

== Medical facilities ==
In the East Bokaro Coalfield, CCL has the following facilities.

Central Hospital Dhori at Dhori with 50 beds has seven general duty medical officers and three specialists. It has an audiometer, spirometer, and ICU. It has four ambulances.

Regional Hospital at Kargali, with 60 beds, has three general duty medical officers and three specialists. It has surgical and eye equipment. It has two ambulances.

Bokaro Colliery Hospital at Bermo has 48 beds and two general duty medical officers. It has facilities for routine tests.

Kathara Hospital at Kathara with 35 beds has four general duty medical officers. It has X-ray, ECG, and auto analyser. It has two ambulances.

Swang Hospital at Swang has 11 beds.

Jarangdih Hospital at Jaragdih has 11 beds.

There are central facilities in the Central Hospital, Gandhinagar at Kanke Road, Ranchi with 250 beds, and in the Central Hospital, Naisarai at Ramgarh with 150 beds.

There are dispensaries at Gobindpur in the Kathara Area, Karo I/ Jawahar Nagar, AAK OCP/ KMP in the Bokaro & Kargali Area, and Central Colony and Kalyani in the Dhori Area.
