= Bokaro (Thermal) =

- Census Town
- Location in Jharkhand, India Bokaro (Thermal) (India)
- Coordinates: 23.8016°N 85.8844°E
- Country: India
- State: Jharkhand
- District: Bokaro

Area
  - Total: 20.98 km^{2} (8.10 sq mi)
- Elevation: 234 m (768 ft)

Population (2011)
  - Total: 39,305
  - Density: 1,873/km^{2} (4,852/sq mi)

Languages
  - Official: Hindi, Urdu
- Time zone: UTC+5:30 (IST)
- PIN: 829107
- Telephone code: 06549
- Vehicle registration: JH-09
- Lok Sabha constituency: Giridih
- Vidhan Sabha constituency: Bermo
- Website: bokaro.nic.in

Bokaro Thermal is a census town in Bermo CD block in the Bermo subdivision of the Bokaro district in the state of Jharkhand, India. Often colloquially referred to as 'BTPS', as the Bokaro Thermal Power Station is located in this area.

== Geography ==
Cities, towns and locations in Bokaro district in North Chotanagpur Division
M: municipal town, CT: census town, R: rural/ urban centre, F: Factory, A: Coal Mining Area
Abbreviation used: TPS – Thermal Power Station
Owing to space constraints in the small map, the actual locations in a larger map may vary slightly

=== Location ===
Bokaro Thermal is located at 23.78°N 85.97°E. It has an average elevation of 234 metres (767 feet). It is situated on the banks of the Konar River.

=== Area overview ===
Bokaro district consists of undulating uplands on the Chota Nagpur Plateau with the Damodar River cutting a valley right across. It has an average elevation of 200 to 540 metres (660 to 1,770 ft) above mean sea level. The highest hill, Lugu Pahar, rises to a height of 1,070 metres (3,510 ft). The East Bokaro Coalfield located in the Bermo-Phusro area and small intrusions of Jharia Coalfield make Bokaro a coal rich district. In 1965, one of the largest steel manufacturing units in the country, Bokaro Steel Plant, operated by Steel Authority of India Limited, was set-up at Bokaro Steel City. The Damodar Valley Corporation established its first thermal power station at Bokaro (Thermal). The 5 kilometres (3.1 mi) long, 55 metres (180 ft) high earthfill dam with composite masonry cum concrete spillway, Tenughat Dam, across the Damodar River, is operated by the Government of Jharkhand. The average annual rainfall is 1,291.2 millimetres (50.83 in). The soil is generally infertile and agriculture is mostly rain-fed.

Note: The map alongside presents some of the notable locations in the district. All places marked in the map are linked in the larger full screen map.

== Demographics ==
According to the 2011 Census of India, Bokaro had a total population of 39,305, of which 20,634 (52%) were males and 18,671 (48%) were females. Population in the age range 0–6 years was 4,558. The total number of literate persons in Bokaro was 28,860 (83.06% of the population over 6 years).

As per 2011 Census of India, Phusro Urban Agglomeration had a total population of 186,139, of which males were 97,665 and females 88,874. Phusro Urban Agglomeration is composed of Phusro (NP), Bermo (CT), Jaridih Bazar (CT), Bokaro (CT) and Kurpania (CT).

As of 2001 India census, Bokaro Thermal has a population of 36,419. Males constitute 54% of the population and females 46%. Bokaro Thermal has an average literacy rate of 67%. 14% of the population in this young town is under 6 years of age.

== Infrastructure ==
According to the District Census Handbook 2011, Bokaro, Bokaro covered an area of 20.98 km^{2}. Among the civic amenities, it had 32 km roads with both open and covered drains, the protected water supply involved tap water from treated and untreated sources, overhead tank, service tank. It had 7,484 domestic electric connections, 510 road lighting points. Among the medical facilities, it had 4 hospitals, 2 dispensaries, 2 health centres, 1 family welfare centre, 2 maternity and child welfare centres, 2 maternity homes, 1 nursing home, 30 medicine shops. Among the educational facilities it had 12 primary schools, 7 middle schools, 3 secondary schools, 2 senior secondary schools, 1 general degree college. It had 4 non-formal educational centres (Sarva Siksha Abhiyan). Among the social, recreational and cultural facilities it had 1 stadium, 1 cinema theatre, 35 auditorium/ community halls. Two important commodities it produced were electrical goods and coal. It had the branch office of 4 nationalised banks, 1 cooperative bank, 2 non-agricultural credit societies.

== Education ==
Bokaro Thermal has many schools affiliated to the central and state education boards. The popular ones are Carmel School, St Paul's Modern School, Kendriya Vidyalaya and DVC+2 High School, & DVC M.E. School & Indian school of learning. There are schools which run under the aegis of the DVC management and some run by the Central government. However, the scope of quality education after schooling is limited due to the lack of good colleges. Carmel School is best known for its education and discipline. It is one of the few schools in Bokaro district which is affiliated to I.C.S.E. best Carmel school

There is only one college for graduation in Bokaro Thermal.

== Economy ==
=== Industry ===
Bokaro Thermal Power Plant is the oldest thermal power plant in Asia run by Damodar Valley Corporation, India's first multipurpose river valley project. It was started in 1953 in collaboration with USA and West Germany by the then Prime Minister of the country Pandit Jawaharlal Nehru.

It has two power plants:

- BTPS 'A' was started on 21.02.1953 and closed down on 17 July 2000 for violating pollution norms. A new efficient 500MW has been set by BHEL here which was commissioned in May 2016.
- BTPS 'B' has three power generating units producing a total of 630 MW (3×210). The first unit was commissioned in 1986.

In addition, a new 500 MW plant is under construction, which is likely to be commissioned in 2012-13. It is coming up at an estimated cost of Rs 4,000 crores.

=== Coal mining ===
Collieries in the CCL Kathara Area (East Bokaro Coalfield)
U: Underground colliery, O: Open Cast colliery, M: Mixed colliery, W: Washery, S: Facility, A: Administrative headquarters
Owing to space constraints in the small map, the actual locations in a larger map may vary slightly

Bokaro and Kargali Area of Central Coalfields Limited operates the following projects in East Bokaro Coalfield among others in Bokaro district: Bokaro open cast, Karagli OC, Kargali underground, Karo OC, Karo underground, Karo Spl. UG, Khas Mahal OC, Khas Mahal UG and Kargali Washery. Dhori Area of CCL operates: Amlo OC, Dhori OC, Selected Dhori Quarry No.I OC, Selected Dhori Quarry No. III OC, New Selected Dhori UG and Dhori Khas UG.

== Transport ==
Bokaro Thermal railway station serves quite a few trains. There are three local trains daily on Barkakana–Netaji S.C.Bose Gomoh line and vice versa.

Major City	Distance (in km)
Bokaro Steel City	48
Chandrapura	29
Gomoh	43
Ranchi	110
Dhanbad	80
Kolkata	300
Patna	305

== Places of interest ==
- DVC Football Ground.
- DVC Centre Market.
- Raza Jama Maszid- Situated near Noori Nagar.
- Urdu Majlis - Situated near GM colony Church.
- Panch Mandir- Situated near railway station.
- Hanuman Mandir- Situated near police station
- Shiv Mandir- Situated near ash pond.
- Vir Kunwar Singh Park- Situated near central market.
- Govindpur hari Bola Mandir (govindpur basti)
- Lahariya tand (ground &Hills)
