= Electrosteel Castings =

Indian ductile iron pipe manufacturer pvt ltd

Electrosteel Castings Limited
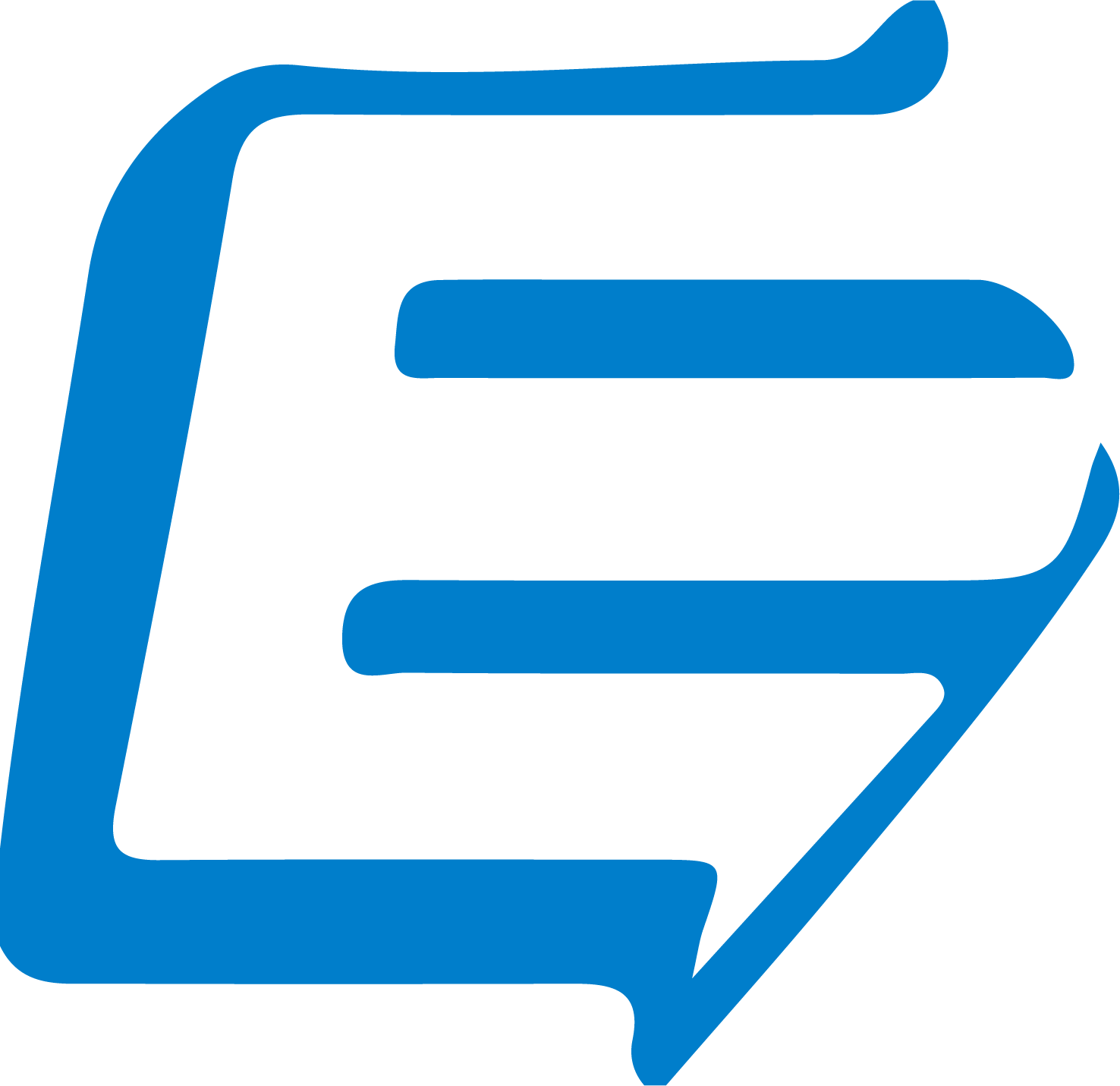
- Type: Public
- Traded as: NSE: ELECTCAST; BSE: 500128
- Founded: 1955; 71 years ago
- Headquarters: Kolkata, West Bengal, India
- Key people: Pradip Kumar Khaitan (chairman); Umang Kejriwal (MD); Sunil Katial (CEO)
- Revenue: ▲₹7,360.42 crore (US$760 million) (2023)
- Net income: ▼₹315.80 crore (US$33 million) (2023)
- Total assets: ▲₹8,623.82 crore (US$900 million) (2022)
- Total equity: ▲₹4,104.47 crore (US$430 million) (2022)
- Website: www.electrosteel.com

Electrosteel Castings Limited is an Indian company based in Kolkata. It is one of the largest manufacturers of ductile iron pipes in the Indian sub-continent, having a production capacity of 280,000 MT per annum. Electrosteel was the pioneer in setting up a Ductile Iron Spun Pipe Plant in India in 1994 and is among the five largest producers of Spun Iron pipes in the world.

== History ==
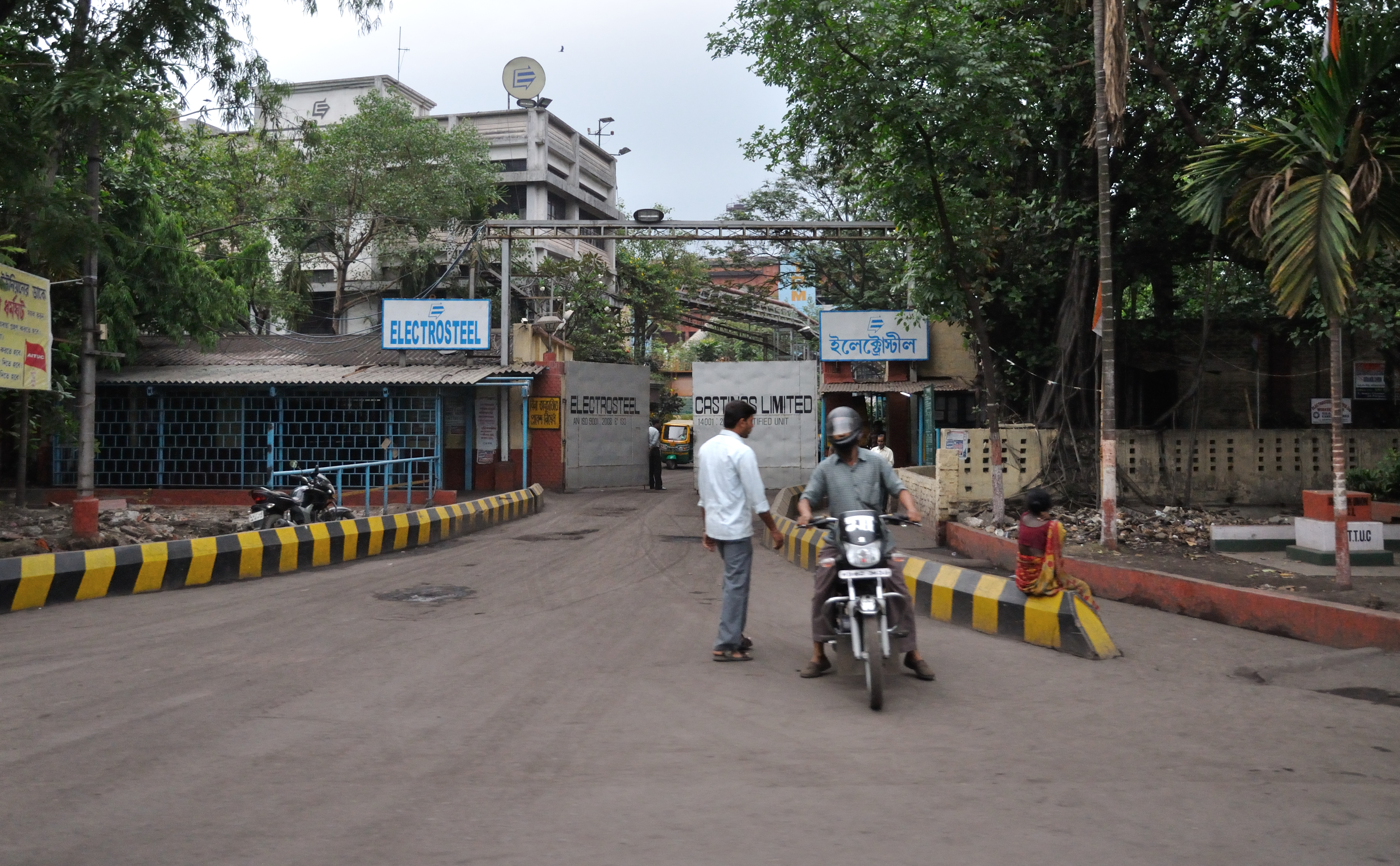
Plant of Electrosteel Castings at Khardaha.

In 1955, Electrosteel established a Steel Foundry at Khardah, near Kolkata, West Bengal. Subsequently, it started manufacturing Gray Cast Iron Spun Pipes in 1959.

In 1982 it took over Shakti Pipes Ltd. at Elavur, near Chennai and also started making Gray Cast Iron Spun Pipes there.

In 1994, it established the first Ductile Iron Spun Pipe unit of the Indian sub-continent at Khardah. Within a few years, it received good acceptability among water engineers and the capacity was expanded to 0.28 million ton per annum. It subsequently started manufacturing Ductile Iron Fittings at Khardah in 2001.

In 2005, it also established a coke oven, a sponge iron plant and a power plant at Haldia, as a part of its backward integration drive.

== International operations ==
About 50% of Ductile Iron Pipes and Fittings produced by Electrosteel is exported to various countries in Europe, USA, South America, South East Asia, Middle East, North and South African Countries. A number of overseas offices and subsidiary companies have been established in France, Spain, United Kingdom, United States, Singapore and Algeria.

Electrosteel Castings acquired Singardo International, a company in the water and gas sectors, to expand its market reach in Southeast Asia and leverage Singardo's global sales network for sourcing and trading of industry products.

== Financials ==
Electrosteel reported a total income of Rs.7360.42 crores during the financial year ended March 31, 2023 as compared to Rs.5336.70 crores during the financial year ended March 31, 2022. The company has posted net profit of Rs.315.8022 crores for the financial year ended March 31, 2023 as against net profit of Rs.347.2773 crores for the financial year ended March 31, 2022.

== Accreditations ==
Electrosteel produces ductile iron pipes and fittings as per the international benchmark and its quality is approved in various countries. The Company obtained KITEMARK License from the British Standards Institute ("BSI") for its DI Spun Pipes and Fittings. In addition, it received accreditations from Germany, BSI (UK) and various governmental approvals in the Middle East. It also secured approvals from NSF, UL and FM from USA and ACS/NF from France. Its products are also certified by the Drinking Water Inspectorate (DWI) and the Water Regulation Advisory Scheme (WRAS) in the UK.

Electrosteel is an ISO 9001 and ISO 14001 certified organization and has SA8000 certification as a socially responsible organization.
