= Phusro =

- Nagar Parishad
- Location in Jharkhand, India Phusro (India)
- Coordinates: 23.77°N 85.99°E
- Country: India
- State: Jharkhand
- District: Bokaro

Area
  - Nagar Parishad: 45.22 km^{2} (17.46 sq mi)

Population (2011)
  - Nagar Parishad: 89,178
  - Density: 1,972/km^{2} (5,108/sq mi)
  - Metro: 186,139

Languages
  - Official: Hindi, Urdu
- Time zone: UTC+5:30 (IST)
- PIN: 829144
- Telephone code: 06549
- Vehicle registration: JH-09
- Lok Sabha constituency: Giridih
- Vidhan Sabha constituency: Bermo

Phusro is a nagar parishad in the Bermo subdivision of the Bokaro district in the Indian state of Jharkhand. It is situated about 35 kilometres (22 mi) from the district headquarters of Bokaro district. Damodar River passes through it.

== Geography ==
Cities, towns and locations in Bokaro district in North Chotanagpur Division
M: municipal town, CT: census town, R: rural/ urban centre, F: Factory, A: Coal Mining Area
Abbreviation used: TPS – Thermal Power Station
Owing to space constraints in the small map, the actual locations in a larger map may vary slightly

=== Location ===
Phusro is located at 23.77°N 85.99°E

=== Area overview ===
Bokaro district consists of undulating uplands on the Chota Nagpur Plateau with the Damodar River cutting a valley right across. It has an average elevation of 200 to 540 metres (660 to 1,770 ft) above mean sea level. The highest hill, Lugu Pahar, rises to a height of 1,070 metres (3,510 ft). The East Bokaro Coalfield located in the Bermo-Phusro area and small intrusions of Jharia Coalfield make Bokaro a coal rich district. In 1965, one of the largest steel manufacturing units in the country, Bokaro Steel Plant, operated by Steel Authority of India Limited, was set up at Bokaro Steel City. The Damodar Valley Corporation established its first thermal power station at Bokaro (Thermal). The 5 kilometres (3.1 mi) long, 55 metres (180 ft) high earthfill dam with composite masonry cum concrete spillway, Tenughat Dam, across the Damodar River, is operated by the Government of Jharkhand. The average annual rainfall is 1,291.2 millimetres (50.83 in). The soil is generally infertile and agriculture is mostly rain-fed.

Note: The map alongside presents some of the notable locations in the district. All places marked in the map are linked in the larger full screen map.

== Demographics ==
According to the 2011 Census of India, Phusro (nagar parishad) had a total population of 89,178, of which 46,605 (52%) were males and 42,573 (48%) were females. Population in the age range 0–6 years was 11,124. The total number of literate persons in Phusro was 60,973 (78,12% of the population over 6 years).

As per the 2011 Census of India, Phusro Urban Agglomeration had a total population of 186,139, of which 97,665 were males and 88,874 females. Phusro Urban Agglomeration is composed of Phusro (Nagar Parishad), Bermo (Census Town), Jaridih Bazar (CT), Bokaro (CT) and Kurpania (CT).

As of 2001 India census, Phusro had a population of 83,463. Males constitute 54% of the population and females 46%. In Phusro, 15% of the population is under 6 years of age.===Languages===

Languages spoken in Phurso Town (2011)
1. Hindi (33.8%)
2. khortha (25.5%)
3. Magadhi (12.8%)
4. Bengali (6.49%)
5. bhojpuri (6.42%)
6. Urdu (4.79%)
7. Others (10.3%)

== Infrastructure ==
According to the District Census Handbook 2011, Bokaro, Phusro covered an area of 45.22 km^{2}. Among the civic amenities, it had 90 km roads with open drains, the protected water supply involved tap water from treated sources, hand pump, overhead tank. It had 15,798 domestic electric connections, 703 road lighting points. Among the medical facilities, it had 1 hospital, 18 dispensaries, 18 health centres, 1 family welfare centre, 7 maternity and child welfare centres, 2 maternity homes, 1 nursing home, 25 medicine shops. Among the educational facilities it had 33 primary schools, 21 middle schools, 11 secondary schools, 4 senior secondary schools, 2 general degree colleges. It had 8 non-formal educational centres (Sarva Siksha Abhiyan). Among the social, recreational and cultural facilities it had 1 stadium, 2 cinema theatres, 1 auditorium/ community hall, 3 public libraries, 3 reading rooms. One important commodity it produced was refined coal. It had the branch office of 6 nationalised banks, 1 cooperative bank, 10 agricultural credit societies, 5 non-agricultural credit societies.

== Economy ==
=== Coal mining ===
Collieries in the CCL Bokaro and Kargali Area and CCL Dhori Area (both in East Bokaro Coalfield)
U: Underground colliery, O: Open Cast colliery, M: Mixed colliery, W: Washery, S: F: Facility, A: Administrative headquarters
Owing to space constraints in the small map, the actual locations in a larger map may vary slightly

Bokaro and Kargali Area of Central Coalfields Limited operates the following projects in East Bokaro Coalfield among others in Bokaro district: Bokaro open cast, Karagli OC, Kargali underground, Karo OC, Karo underground, Karo Spl. UG, Khas Mahal OC, Khas Mahal UG and Kargali Washery. Dhori Area of CCL operates: Amlo OC, Dhori OC, Selected Dhori Quarry No.I OC, Selected Dhori Quarry No. III OC, New Selected Dhori UG and Dhori Khas UG. The area office is at Kargali, PO Bermo 829104.

The projects of the Dhori Area are: Amlo opencast, Dhori open cast, Selected Dhori Quarry No. I open cast, Selected Dhori Quarry No. III open cast, New Selected Dhori underground, Dhori Khas underground. The area office is at Dhori, PO Dhori 825102.

== Transport ==
Phusro railway station is connected to Kolkata, Bhopal, Ajmer, Jabalpur, Ujjain, Patna by direct trains. It lies on the Gomoh-Barkakana lines. The station has been selected to be developed into 'Adarsh Station' in a recent rail budget. Large numbers of buses ply between Phusro and neighbouring cities like Ranchi, Jamshedpur, Dhanbad, Bokaro, and Hazaribagh. Buses to north Bihar cities also ply from Phusro.

== Education ==
It has many good schools for primary and high school educations, namely, DAV Public School, Dhori (IAS officer of 2009 Batch, Shubhra Saxena, who scored AIR 1, is an alumnus of DAVPS Dhori) Bharat Singh Public School, Rukmini Devi Public School, Anpati Devi Saraswati Shishu Vidya Mandir (Phusro), Saraswati Shisu Vidya Mandir (Dhori), Rambilas High School, Carmel School Kargali, Ram Ratan High School, and others. It has one girls college, JSM college which is affiliated to VBU, Hazaribagh. Many students study outside the state due to a lack of good higher education college.

== Health services ==
It has two CCL managed hospitals, namely Central Hospital, Dhori and Central Hospital, Kargali and a government hospital called Referral Hospital. Mainly the private clinics serve local people. The government-run hospital has very poor facilities but is good for first aid and other primary care, and a subdivisional hospital also with no proper facility.
