= Bermo =

- Census Town
- Location in Jharkhand, India Bermo (India)
- Coordinates: 23°47′N 85°57′E
- Country: India
- State: Jharkhand
- District: Bokaro

Government
  - Body: Nagar Palika

Area
  - Total: 11.18 km^{2} (4.32 sq mi)

Population (2011)
  - Total: 17,401
  - Density: 1,556/km^{2} (4,031/sq mi)

Languages
  - Official: Hindi, Urdu
- Time zone: UTC+5:30 (IST)
- PIN: 829127
- Telephone/ STD code: 06549
- Vehicle registration: JH 09
- Lok Sabha constituency: Giridih
- Vidhan Sabha constituency: Bermo
- Website: bokaro.nic.in

For the town in North Wales, see Y Bermo
For the commune of Niger see Bermo, Niger

Bermo is a census town in the Bermo CD block in the Bermo subdivision of the Bokaro district of the state of Jharkhand, India.

== Geography ==
Cities, towns and locations in Bokaro district in North Chotanagpur Division
M: municipal town, CT: census town, R: rural/ urban centre, F: Factory, A: Coal Mining Area
Abbreviation used: TPS – Thermal Power Station
Owing to space constraints in the small map, the actual locations in a larger map may vary slightly

=== Location ===
Bermo is located at 23°47′N 85°57′E.

=== Area overview ===
Bokaro district consists of undulating uplands on the Chota Nagpur Plateau with the Damodar River cutting a valley right across. It has an average elevation of 200 to 540 metres (660 to 1,770 ft) above mean sea level. The highest hill, Lugu Pahar, rises to a height of 1,070 metres (3,510 ft). The East Bokaro Coalfield located in the Bermo-Phusro area and small intrusions of Jharia Coalfield make Bokaro a coal rich district. In 1965, one of the largest steel manufacturing units in the country, Bokaro Steel Plant, operated by Steel Authority of India Limited, was set-up at Bokaro Steel City. The Damodar Valley Corporation established its first thermal power station at Bokaro (Thermal). The 5 kilometres (3.1 mi) long, 55 metres (180 ft) high earthfill dam with composite masonry cum concrete spillway, Tenughat Dam, across the Damodar River, is operated by the Government of Jharkhand. The average annual rainfall is 1,291.2 millimetres (50.83 in). The soil is generally infertile and agriculture is mostly rain-fed.

Note: The map alongside presents some of the notable locations in the district. All places marked in the map are linked in the larger full screen map.

== Demographics ==
According to the 2011 Census of India, Bermo had a total population of 17,401, of which 9,086 (52%) were males and 8,315 (48%) were females. Population in the age range 0–6 years was 2,328. The total number of literate persons in Bermo was 11,152 (73.99% of the population over 6 years).

As per 2011 Census of India, Phusro Urban Agglomeration had a total population of 186,139, of whom males were 97,665 and females 88,874. Phusro Urban Agglomeration is composed of Phusro (NP), Bermo (CT), Jaridih Bazar (CT), Bokaro (CT) and Kurpania (CT).

As of 2001 India census, Bermo had a population of 16,954. Males constitute 53% of the population and females 47%. Bermo has an average literacy rate of 58%, lower than the national average of 59.5%; with 61% of the males and 39% of females literate. 15% of the population is under 6 years of age.

== Civic administration ==
=== Police station ===
Bermo police station is located at Bermo. According to old British records, Bermo PS was there after Giridh subdivision was formed (then in Hazaribagh district) in 1870.

=== CD block HQ ===
The headquarters of Bermo CD block are located at Bermo.

== Infrastructure ==
Collieries in the CCL Bokaro and Kargali Area and CCL Dhori Area (both in East Bokaro Coalfield)
U: Underground colliery, O: Open Cast colliery, M: Mixed colliery, W: Washery, S: F: Facility, A: Administrative headquarters
Owing to space constraints in the small map, the actual locations in a larger map may vary slightly

According to the District Census Handbook 2011, Bokaro, Bermo covered an area of 11.18 km^{2}. Among the civic amenities, it had 20 km roads with open drains, the protected water supply involved tap water from treated sources, uncovered well, overhead tank. It had 3,227 domestic electric connections, 250 road lighting points. Among the medical facilities, it had 2 hospitals, 1 dispensary, 1 health centre, 1 family welfare centre, 8 maternity and child welfare centres, 8 maternity homes, 1 nursing home, 2 medicine shops. Among the educational facilities it had 8 primary schools, 6 middle schools, 2 secondary schools, 1 senior secondary school, 1 general degree college. It had 1 non-formal educational centre (Sarva Siksha Abhiyan). Among the social, recreational and cultural facilities it had 1 stadium, 10 auditorium/ community halls, 1 public library, 1 reading room. An important commodity it produced was coal. It had the branch office of 1 nationalised bank, 1 agricultural credit society, 4 non-agricultural credit societies.

== Economy ==
=== Coal mining ===
Bokaro and Kargali Area of Central Coalfields Limited operates the following projects in East Bokaro Coalfield among others in Bokaro district: Bokaro open cast, Karagli OC, Kargali underground, Karo OC, Karo underground, Karo Spl. UG, Khas Mahal OC, Khas Mahal UG and Kargali Washery. Dhori Area of CCL operates: Amlo OC, Dhori OC, Selected Dhori Quarry No.I OC, Selected Dhori Quarry No. III OC, New Selected Dhori UG and Dhori Khas UG.
