= Jharia coalfield =

Coal field in Jharkhand, India

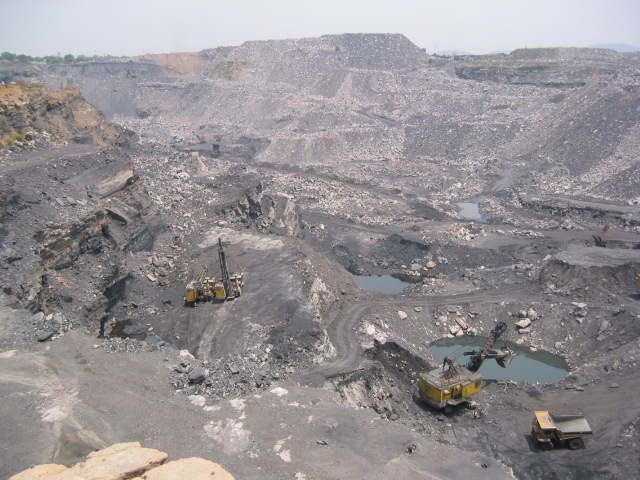

- Location within Jharkhand
- Location: Jharkhand, India; 23°45′5.6″N 86°25′13.2″E
- Products: Coking coal

Jharia coalfield is a large coal field located in the east of India in Jharia, Dhanbad, Jharkhand. Jharia represents the largest coal reserves in India having estimated reserves of 19.4 billion tonnes of coking coal. The coalfield is an important contributor to the local economy, employing much of the local population either directly or indirectly.

The fields have suffered a coal bed fire since at least 1916, resulting in 37 millions tons of coal consumed by the fire, and significant ground subsidence and water and air pollution in local communities including the city of Jharia. The resulting pollution has led to a government agency designated for moving local populations, however, little progress has been made in the relocation.

== Coal field ==
The coal field lies in the Damodar River Valley, and covers about 110 square miles (280 square km), and produces bituminous coal suitable for coke. Most of India's coal comes from Jharia. Jharia coal mines are India's largest store of prime coke coal used in blast furnaces, it consists of 23 large underground and nine large open cast mines.

== History ==
The mining activities in these coalfields started in 1894 and had really intensified by 1925. The first Indians to arrive and break monopoly of British in coal mining were Gujarati railway contractors from Kutch some of whom decided to plunge into the coal mining business and were thus the pioneers in starting coal mining in Jharia coalfields belt around 1890–95. In Jharia-Dhanbad belt Seth Khora Ramji was the first Indian to break monopoly of Europeans and founded Khas Jharia, Golden Jharia, Fatehpur, Balihari, Khas Jeenagora, East Bagatdih Collieries with his brothers between 1894 and 1910. In Pure Jharia Colliery Khora Ramji and brothers were partners with Diwan Bahadur D.D. Thacker. The Encyclopaedia of Bengal, Bihar & Orissa (1920) by British Gazetteer mentions about Seth Khora Ramji as under :-

..at that time (in 1890s) the Jharia coal fields were being exploited by Europeans and Seth Khora Ramji was first Indian to seize the opportunity. He purchased two collieries to begin with. Gradually others from Kutch and Gujarat followed suit and now Jharia has been changed into a Gujarati settlement with about 50 Kutchi out of 92 Gujarati collieries proprietors with Seth Khora Ramji as head of them all. He is now sole proprietor of two collieries and a financing member of about eight collieries. Several district officials have remarked him as multi-millionaire, one of the first class parties in Jharia.

The Gujarati migrants, majority of whom from Kutch, took on lease the coal mining fields from Raja of Jharia at various locations to start collieries at Khas Jharia, Jamadoba, Balihari, Tisra, Katrasgarh, Kailudih, Kusunda, Govindpur, Sijua, Sijhua, Loyabad, Joyrampur, Bhaga, Matadih, Mohuda, Dhansar, Bhuli, Bermo, Mugma, Chasnala-Bokaro, Bugatdih, Putki, Pandibri, Rajapur, Jeenagora, Gareria, Chirkunda, Bhowrah, Sinidih, Kendwadih, Dumka, etc.

=== Coal field fire ===
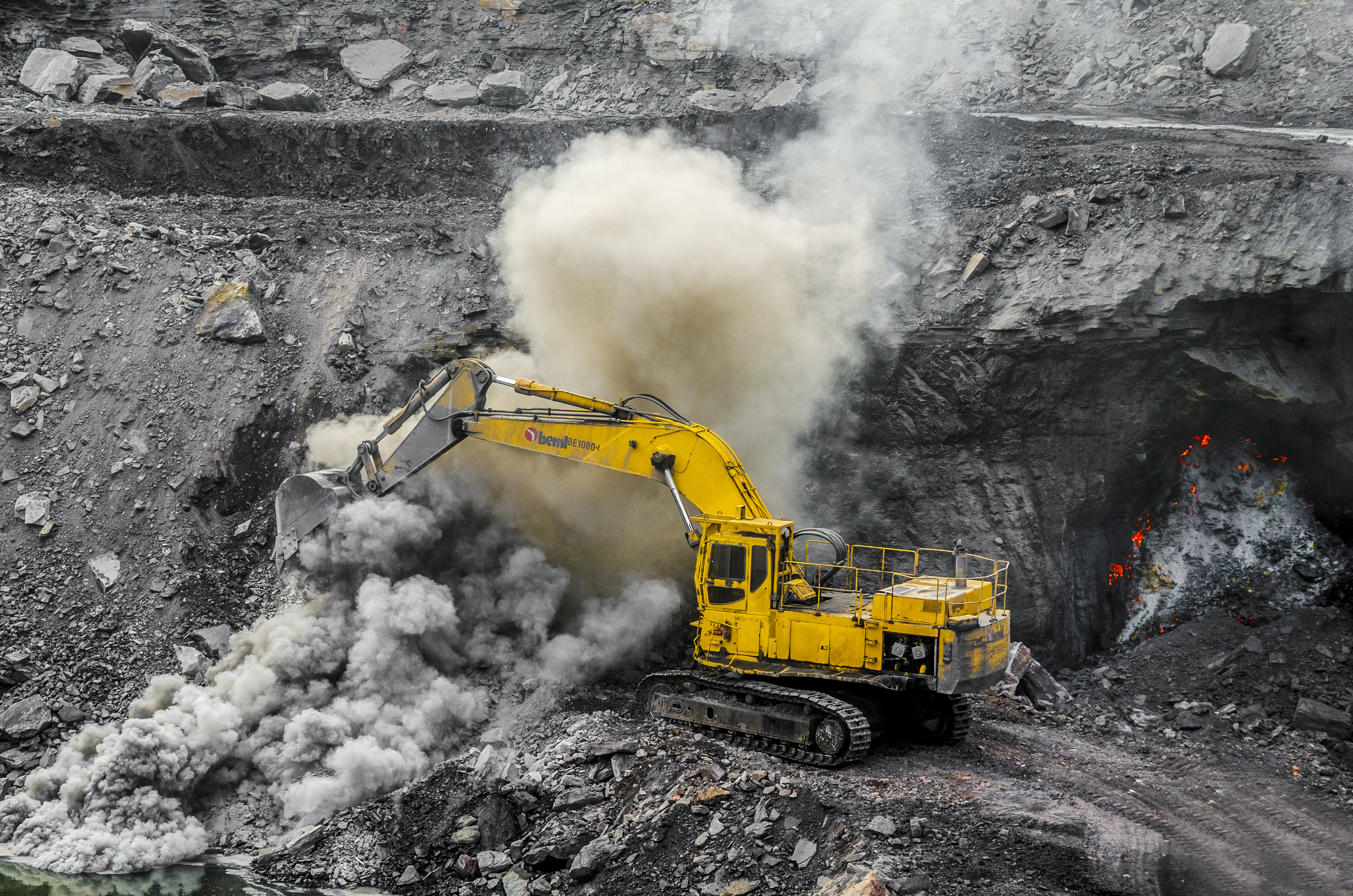
Jharia coal mine with smoke and burning embers coming from the underground coal field fire. The fire has burned for over a century and displaced or endangered the health of hundreds of thousands of people.

Jharia is famous for its coal field fire that has burned underground for over a century. In 2007 it was estimated that 37 million tons of coal had been consumed by the fires since their start.

The first fire was detected in 1916 at Bhowrah colliery owned by Eastern Coal Co Limited. Since then a number of fires have occurred in U/G, Opencast and in OCM debris. Due to unscientific mining underground fire spread to other mines

According to records, almost fifteen years later after first fire incident occurred at Bhowrah Colliery owned by Eastern Coal Company, one of the major mines which collapsed due to underground fire was the Khas Jharia mines of Seth Khora Ramji (1860–1924), who was a pioneer of Indian coal mines. His Khas Jharia mine was one of the first to collapse in underground fire in 1930. Two of his collieries, Khas Jharia and Golden Jharia, which worked on maximum 260-foot-deep shafts, collapsed due to underground fires, in which their house and bungalow also collapsed, on 8 November 1930, causing 18 feet subsidence and widespread destruction. The fire has been burning ever since, despite sincere efforts by mines department and railway authorities and in 1933 flaming crevasses lead to exodus of many residents. The 1934 Nepal–Bihar earthquake led to further spread of fire and by 1938 the authorities had declared that there is raging fire beneath the town with 42 collieries out of 133 on fire.

In 1972, more than 70 mine fires were reported in this region. As of 2007, more than 400,000 people who live in Jharia are living on land in danger of subsidence due to the fires, and according to Satya Pratap Singh, "Jharia township is on the brink of an ecological and human disaster". The government has been criticized for a perceived lackadaisical attitude towards the safety of the people of Jharia. Heavy fumes emitted by the fires lead to severe health problems such as breathing disorders and skin diseases among the local population.

== Bibliography ==
- Reinventing Jharia Coalfield. Edited by N. C. Saxena, Gurdeep Singh, K. N. Singh and B. N. Pan. (2005) Jodhpur. Scientific Publishers, vi, 246 pp. ISBN 81-7233-398-6.
- "Satellites track the fires raging beneath India". New Scientist (2560). 18 July 2006.
- Roychowdhury, Indronil (15 October 2006). "German major eyes Jharia coal fires". Kolkata Newsline.
- "India: Children of the Inferno". Unreported World. Season 17. Episode 7. 24 April 2009. Archived from the original on 15 May 2009.
- "Coal mine fires an election issue in Jharkhand". The Hindu. 12 April 2009. Archived from the original on 4 November 2012.
- "Web documentary about the people who live in proximity to the underground coal fires". Bombay Flying Club - www.bombayfc.com. 6 May 2009. Archived from the original on 15 May 2009.
- eBook about the Jharia Coalfields, Zipfel, Isabell Amazon.com
- "Solar, Eclipsed: Coal? or the Sun? The Power Source India Chooses May Decide the Fate of the Entire Planet." By Charles C. Mann. Wired, November 2015. Solar or Coal? The Energy India Picks May Decide Earth's Fate
