= Tenughat Dam =

- Location in Jharkhand
- Official name: Tenughat Dam
- Country: India
- Location: Bokaro District, Jharkhand
- Coordinates: 23°43′48″N 85°49′55″E
- Purpose: industries, drinking, irrigation
- Status: Functional
- Construction began: 1973
- Opening date: 1978 (year of completion)
- Owner: Government of Jharkhand

Dam and spillways
- Type of dam: earthen with concrete spillway
- Impounds: Damodar River
- Height: 55 metres (180 ft)
- Height (foundation): 50.61 meters
- Length: 6,494 metres (21,306 ft)
- Spillways: 1
- Spillway type: ogee type
- Spillway capacity: 15989 cubic meters/s

Reservoir
- Creates: Tenughat Reservoir
- Total capacity: 1.021 cubic kms (36.06 tmcft)
- Active capacity: 1.00 cubic km (35.32 tmcft)
- Catchment area: 4480 sq km
- Maximum water depth: 44m
- Normal elevation: 268m

Power Station
- Turbines: 0
- Installed capacity: 0 MW
- Annual generation: 0 GW·h

Tenughat Dam is an earthfill dam with composite masonry cum concrete spillway across the Damodar River at Tenughat in Petarwar block of Bokaro district in the Indian state of Jharkhand. It is one of the biggest dam of Jharkhand in terms of storage capacity of water(1020 million cubic meters)(36 Tmcft)

== Geography ==
Cities, towns and locations in Bokaro district in North Chotanagpur Division
M: municipal town, CT: census town, R: rural/ urban centre, F: Factory, A: Coal Mining Area
Abbreviation used: TPS – Thermal Power Station
Owing to space constraints in the small map, the actual locations in a larger map may vary slightly

=== Location ===
Tenughat Dam is located at 23°43′48″N 85°49′55″E.

== Overview ==
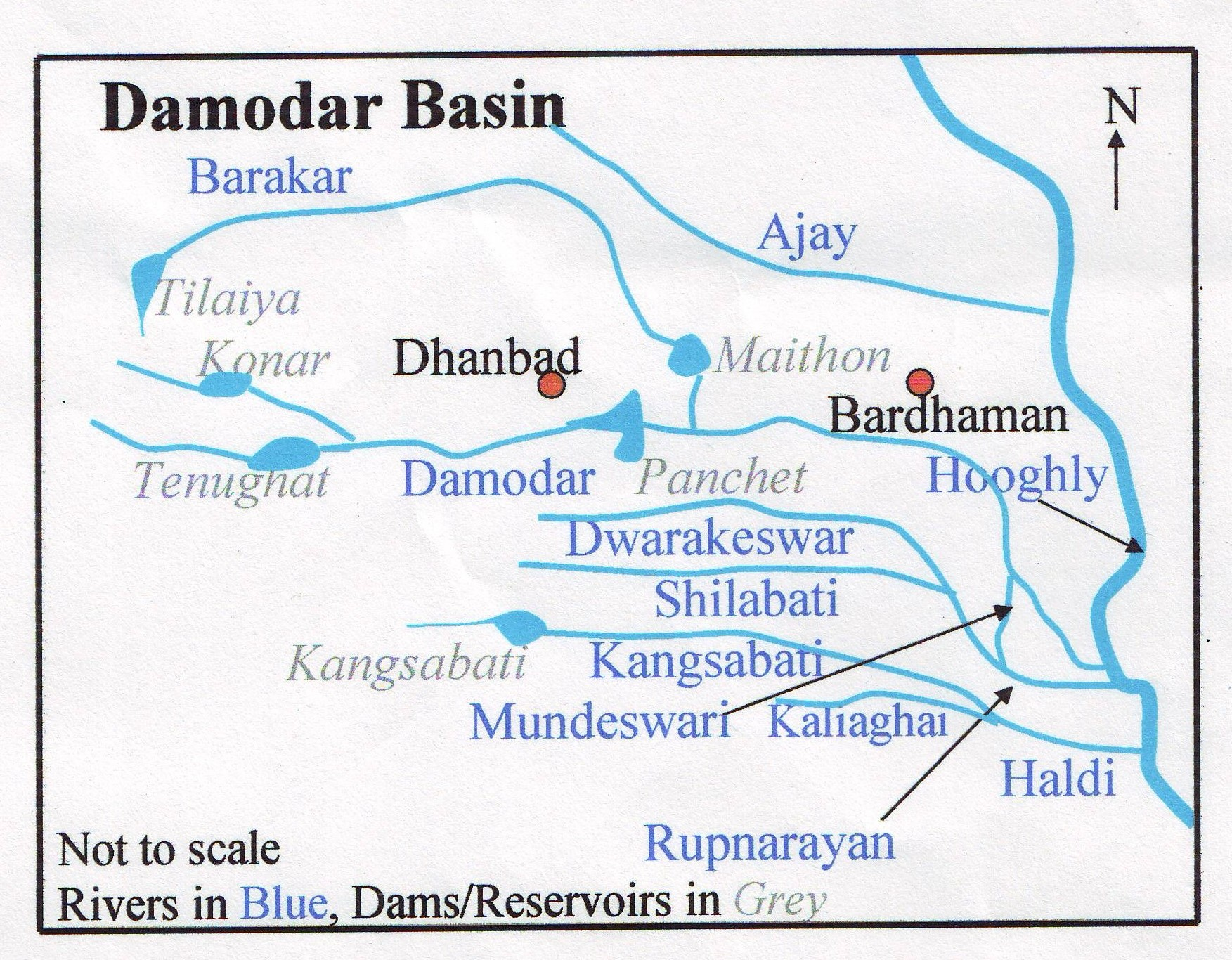
Damodar Basin

The Damodar River Valley Project on the Damodar River and its principal tributary, the Barakar River, is located in eastern India. The four main multipurpose dams located at Tilaiya, Konar, Maithon and Panchet were commissioned during 1953–1959. In addition, a single purpose reservoir on the main stream, the Damodar, at Tenughat (with live storage 224 million m^{3} and without provision for flood storage) was constructed later in 1974. While the four earlier dams are controlled by Damodar Valley Corporation, Tenughat Dam is controlled by the Government of Jharkhand.

== The dam ==
The 6 kilometres (3.7 mi) long, 55 metres (180 ft) high earthfill embankment dam with composite masonry cum concrete spillway and under-sluice structures, concrete diaphragm cut-off wall, rock excavation in foundation, diversion channel, coffer dam and appurtenant works at Tenughat was built for supply of water to Bokaro Steel Plant and the Bokaro industrial area.

== Tourism ==
Union tourism ministry's proposal to boost tourism in each district, Bokaro district has zeroed in on the Tenughat dam area to be developed into a tourist centre.
