= Bokaro Steel Plant =

Steel plant in Jharkhand, India

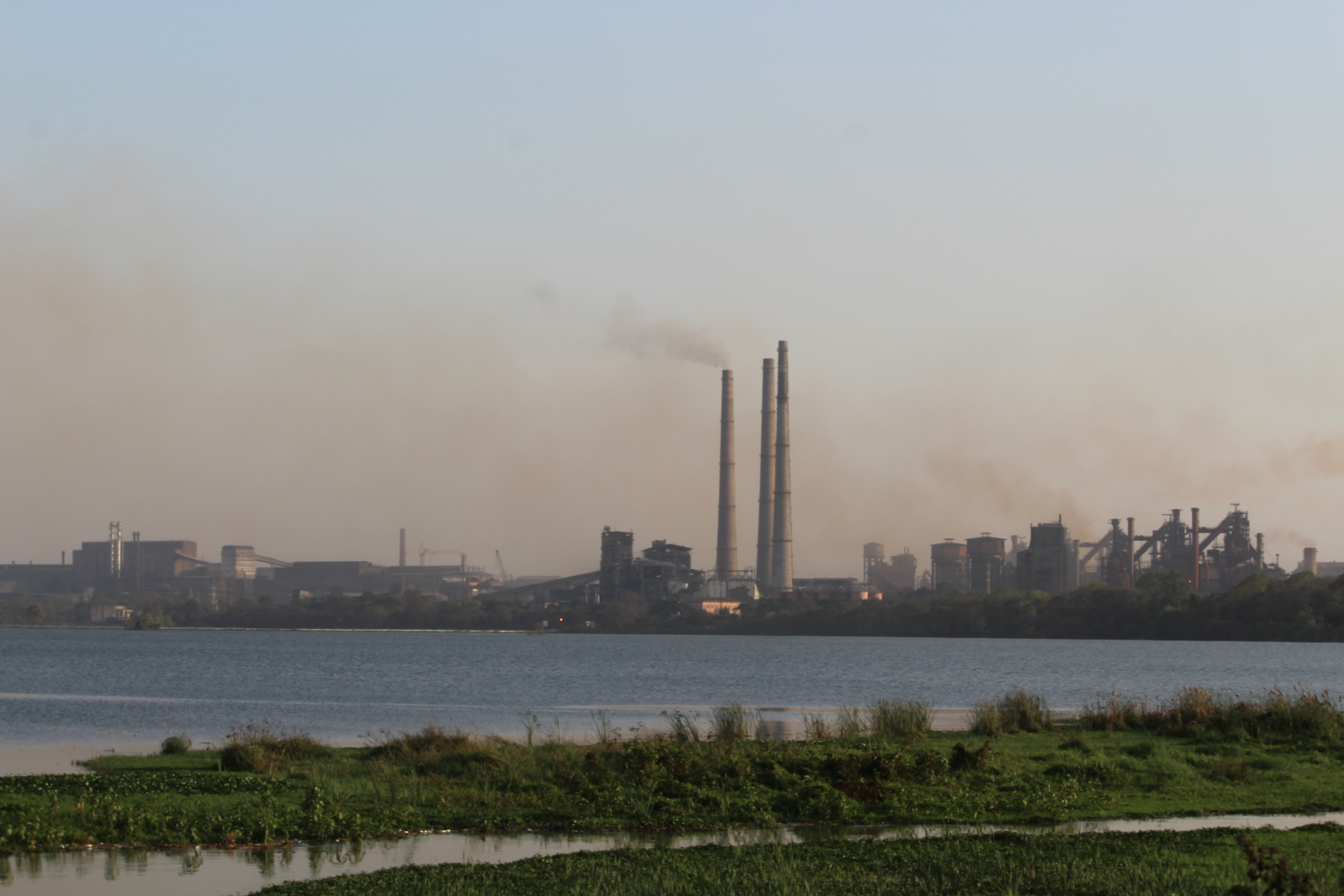
- Type: part of SAIL
- Industry: Steel
- Founded: 1964
- Headquarters: Bokaro, Jharkhand, India
- Key people: Priya Ranjan, Director In Charge
- Products: IS 5986 HR Plates & sheets IS 1079 HR Coils General Engineering steels
- Revenue: $900 million(2022)
- Net income: $75 million(2022)

Bokaro Steel Plant (BSL) is located in the Bokaro district of Jharkhand. It is the fourth integrated public sector steel plant in India built with Soviet technology. It is the largest steel plant in India in terms of area (10 km x 5 km).

== History ==
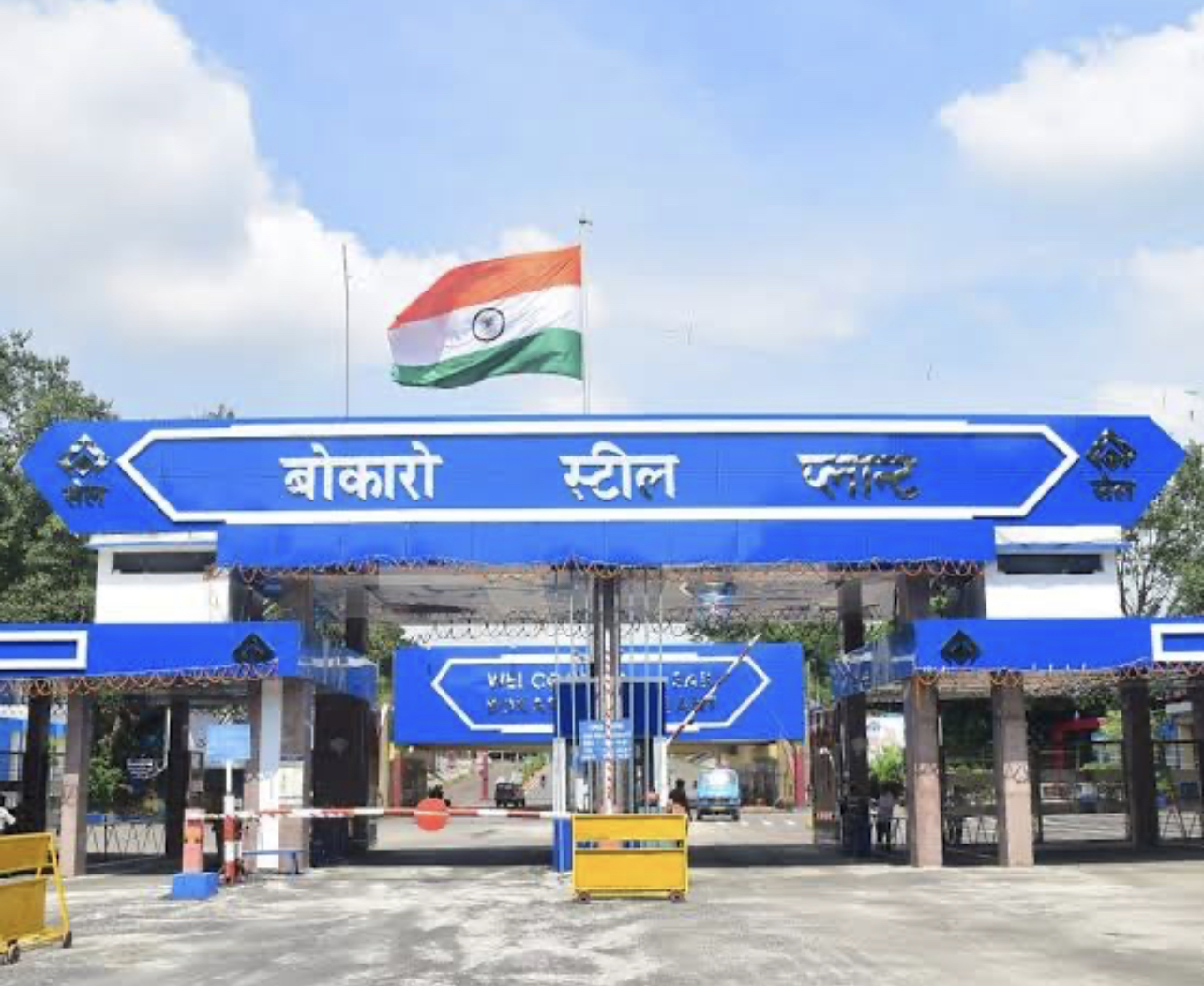
Bokaro Steel Plant gate

Bokaro Steel project, which is now in Jharkhand after the bifurcation of Bihar in 2000, was planned in the late 1950s. The political elites of Bihar then argued for a case for building a steel plant in Bokaro as Bihar was backwards in terms of industrialisation and the area where the steel plant was proposed was rich in mineral resources required for making steel as it was situated in the Chota Nagpur plateau.

The area is rich in coal, iron ore as it is located in Chota Nagpur plateau, which is world famous for rich minerals and mines.

The achievement of Self-Sufficiency is a long process, and even as PM Jawaharlal Nehru worked towards that goal, the nation was drawn into closer involvement with the Soviet Union. In September 1964, the Soviets confirmed their readiness to assist in the construction of the huge Bokaro Steel Plant.

The Soviet Union has traditionally managed to secure generous returns on its aid programme in India.The principal redeeming feature of the preliminary agreement between Bokaro Steel and Gipromez is the Russian commitment that they would see it through to 4 million tonnes ingot capacity, though the phasing and completion dates. Heavy Engineering Corporation with help of Gipromez developed the equipment according to Russian specifications. BSL engineers were trained by the Soviet engineers, there was also a dedicated Russian colony in Sector 4 of Bokaro Steel City for their stay. The prestigious firm of MN Dastur and Company was actively associated with the early planning of the project and had the competence to assess critically the proposed Soviet designs, however, muscled out by the Soviet negotiators from the final aid contract to the chagrin of an articulate and aroused public opinion cutting across most political parties.

The steel plant was incorporated as a limited company in 1964. It was later merged with the state-owned Steel Authority of India Limited (SAIL). The steel plant started operation in 1972 with Bokaro city construction completed.

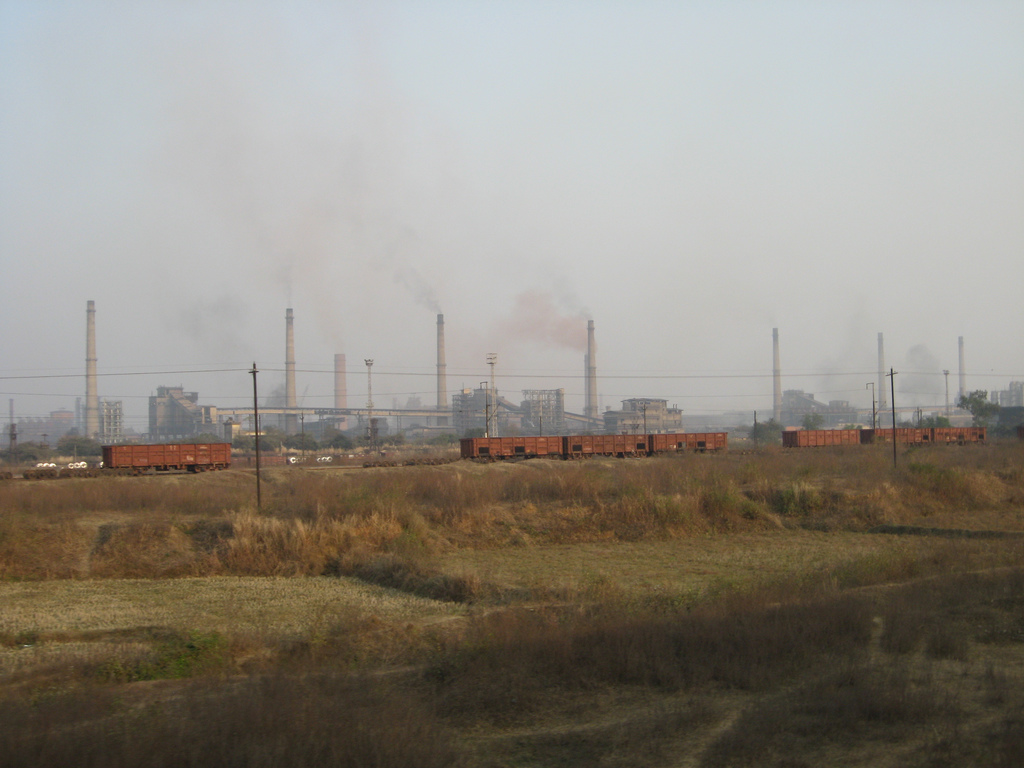
Bokaro Steel Plant seen from a train

== Production ==
Currently, it houses five blast furnaces with a total capacity to produce 5.8 MT of liquid steel. The plant is undergoing a mass modernisation drive after which its output capacity is expected to be 12 MT.

An upgrade of the plant was also done in the 1990s in its steel refining units and continuous casting machines. Initially, about 64 moujas (a mouja may have several village units) had been acquired for the plant. Of the total land acquired, only 7,765 ha was used to set up the steel plant. The rest has been given by SAIL to the private parties without government’s approval.

== Products ==
Bokaro Steel Plant is designed to produce a wide range of products:

1. Hot rolled coils
2. Hot rolled plates
3. Hot rolled sheets
4. Cold rolled coils (CRM)
5. Cold rolled sheets
6. Tin mill black plates
7. Galvanised plain and corrugated sheets
8. Oxygen gas
9. Hydrogen gas
10. Coke oven byproducts
11. Railway tracks
12. DMR grade
13. Steel pipes
14. low weight Stainless steel
15. Jackal steel
16. SeQR TMT Bars

Bokaro has provided a strong raw material base for a variety of modern engineering industries including automobile, pipe and tube, LPG cylinder, barrel and drum producing industries.

== Financials ==
Bokaro Steel Plant has achieved a net profit of Rs 600 crore during the financial year 2022-23, which is 45% of SAIL's total profit of Rs 1330 crore.

== Collaboration ==
Bokaro steel plant uses majority of the Blast furnace equipment from Heavy Engineering Corporation, a PSU from Ranchi and some of the equipment's are used from Larsen & Toubro.
