= Bokaro district =

Coordinates: 23.6892°N 86.110°E

Bokaro district Bōkārō Jilā
- District of Jharkhand
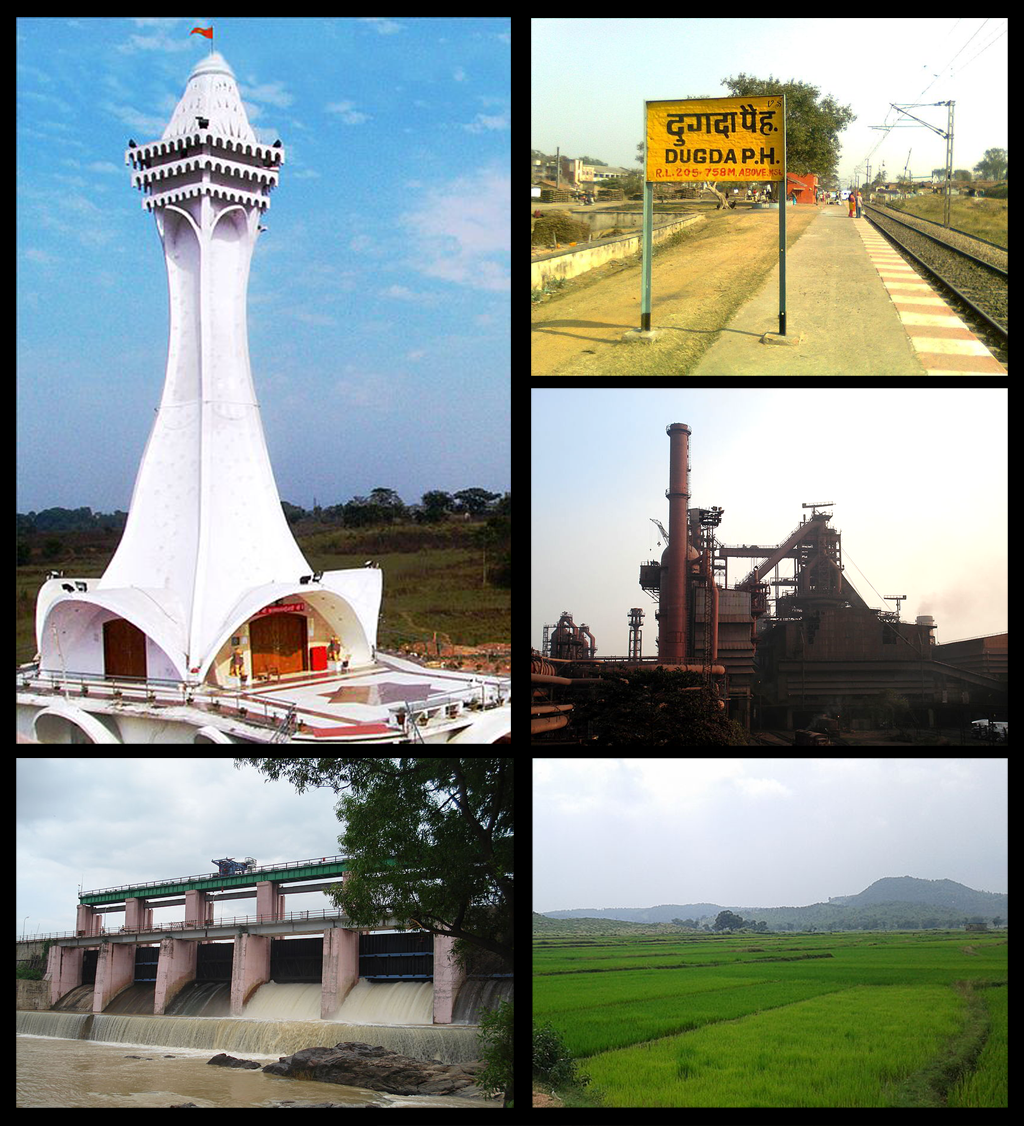
- Clockwise from top-left: Kalika Maharani Temple in Chas, Dugda railway station, Bokaro Steel Plant, Sewati Hills, Dam on Damodar River and Bokaro village Cow
- Interactive map of Bokaro district
- Country: India
- State: Jharkhand
- Division: North Chotanagpur
- Headquarters: Bokaro Steel City
- Tehsils: 8

Government
  - Deputy Commissioner: Sri Ajay Nath Jha (IAS)
  - Superintendent of police: Sri Harvinder Singh (IPS)
  - Lok Sabha constituencies: 1. Dhanbad (shared with Dhanbad district), 2. Giridih (shared with Giridih district)
  - MP: Dhulu Mahato (BJP)

Area
  - Total: 2,883 km^{2} (1,113 sq mi)
  - Rank: 13th

Population
  - Total: 2,062,330
  - Rank: 5th
  - Density: 715.3/km^{2} (1,853/sq mi)
  - Rank: 2nd

Demographics
  - Literacy: 72.01%
- Time zone: UTC+05:30 (IST)
- Major highways: NH 18, NH 320, NH 218
- Website: bokaro.nic.in

Bokaro district is one of the most industrialized zones in India. It is one of the twenty-four districts of the Jharkhand state, India. It was established in 1991 by carving out one subdivision consisting of two blocks from Dhanbad district and six blocks from Giridih district. It is the part of State Capital Region (SCR). The district headquarters is Bokaro Steel City.

== Economy ==
Bokaro is one of the most industrial district in Jharkhand. It is home to the Asia's largest steel plant. It is the hub of economic activity in East India. It is home to many companies such as SAIL, Vedanta Limited, Dalmia Cement Bharat Limited, Jaypee Cement (Bokaro Jaypee Cement Limited), ONGC and Orica. It has many thermal power station such as Chandrapura DVC Thermal Power Station, Tenughat DVC Thermal Power Station and Bokaro Thermal Power Station etc. It is also home to the first explosive factory in India which is located in Gomia. Sudha Dairy has a manufacturing unit here in Bokaro Steel City's Sector 12.

== Demographics ==
Historical population

Year	Pop.	±%
1901	243,649	—
1911	283,125	+16.2%
1921	293,454	+3.6%
1931	345,504	+17.7%
1941	396,143	+14.7%
1951	454,060	+14.6%

Year	Pop.	±%
1961	554,613	+22.1%
1971	762,675	+37.5%
1981	1,097,130	+43.9%
1991	1,454,416	+32.6%
2001	1,777,662	+22.2%
2011	2,062,330	+16.0%

Source: Census of India

Religion in Bokaro district (2011)
Religion	Percent
Hinduism	79.35%
Islam	11.71%
Sarna	7.78%
Christianity	0.67%
Other or not stated	0.49%

According to the 2011 census, Bokaro district has a population of 2,062,330, This gives it a ranking of 222nd in India (out of a total of 640). The district has a population density of 716 inhabitants per square kilometre (1,850/sq mi). Its population growth rate over the decade 2001–2011 was 15.99%. Bokaro has a sex ratio of 916 females for every 1000 males, and a literacy rate of 72.01%. 47.70% of the population lives in urban areas. Scheduled Castes and Scheduled Tribes make up 14.51% and 12.40% of the population respectively.

=== Languages ===
Languages in Bokaro district (2011)
1. Khortha (46.2%)
2. Hindi (13.6%)
3. Bengali (10.7%)
4. Santali (8.67%)
5. Bhojpuri (5.71%)
6. Urdu (4.09%)
7. Magahi (4.04%)
8. Kurmali (2.72%)
9. Maithili (1.14%)
10. Others (3.12%)

At the time of the 2011 Census of India, 46.23% of the population in the district spoke Khortha, 13.61% Hindi, 10.67% Bengali, 8.67% Santali, 5.71% Bhojpuri, 4.09% Urdu, 4.04% Magahi, 2.72% Karmali and 1.14% Maithili as their first language.

== Politics ==
District	No.	Constituency	Name	Party	Alliance	Remarks	Bokaro	34	Gomia	Yogendra Prasad	JMM	MGB	Cabinet minister
35	Bermo	Kumar Jaimangal Singh		INC			Bokaro					MGB	
36	Bokaro	Shwettaa Singh		INC			Bokaro					MGB	
37	Chandankiyari	Umakant Rajak		JMM			Bokaro					MGB	

== Notable people ==
- Ravi Prakash, founder of Screamer (screamer.in) and COVIDEXCHANGE.
- Sambit Patra, national spokesperson of Bharatiya Janata Party.
