= Economy of Bokaro =

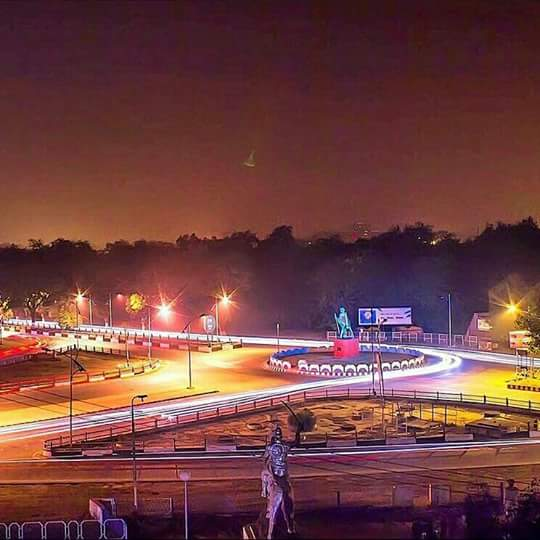
Bokaro Steel City at Night

Here is written about the Economy of Bokaro. Bokaro Steel City is one of the planned cities of India, a major industrial centre and the fourth largest city in the Indian state of Jharkhand. It is the administrative headquarters of Bokaro district. The city stands at the elevation of 210 m (690 ft) above sea level and has an urban area of the city is 183 square kilometres (71 square miles). It is bounded on the east by Dhanbad and Purulia, on the west by Ramgarh and Hazaribagh, on the north by Giridih and on the south by Ranchi. It is accessible through National Highway NH 143 & NH-18 which came between it.

== Steel plants ==
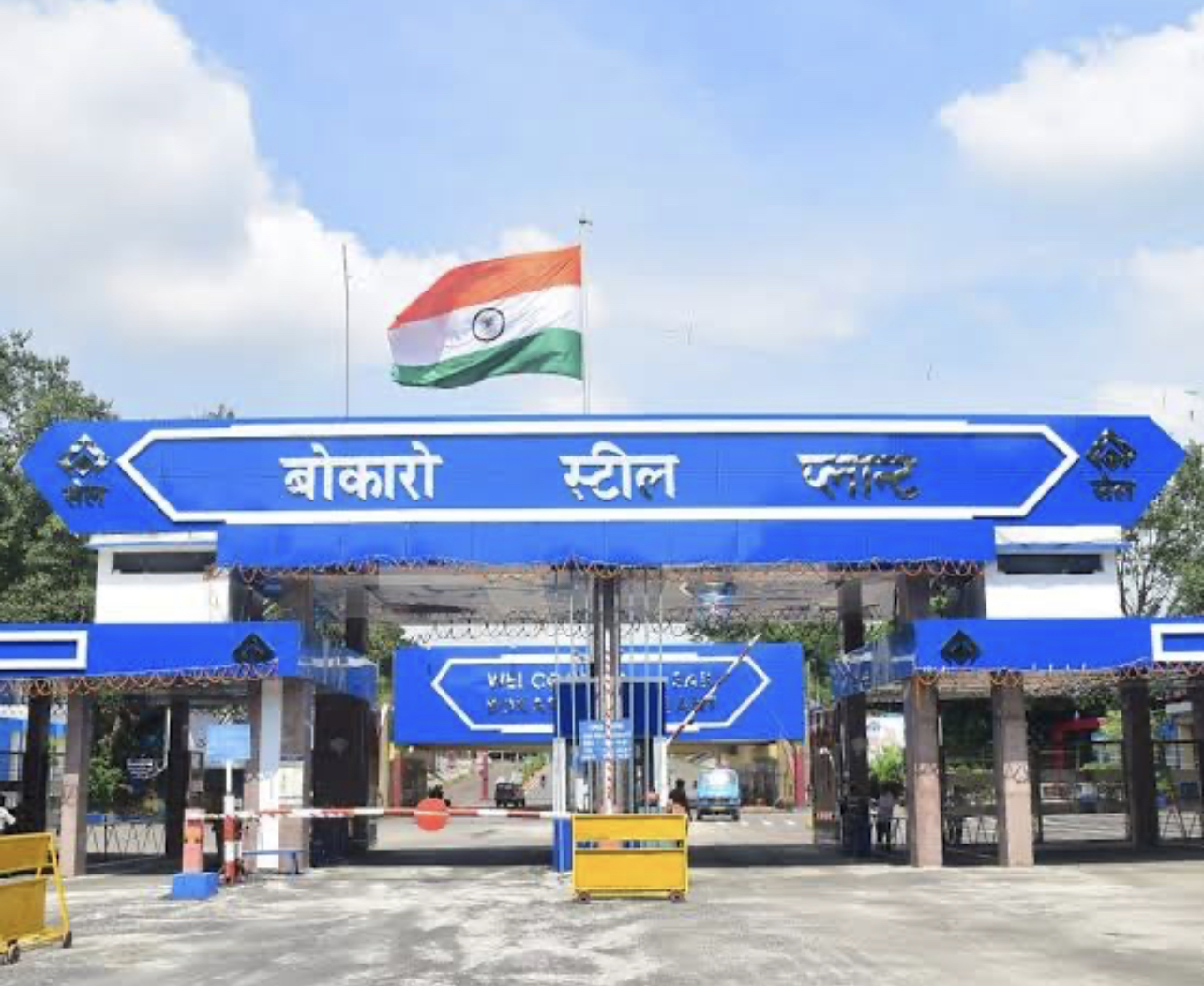
Bokaro Steel Plant Main Gate, commonly known as Steel Gate

Bokaro is mostly known for its steel industry. Here is one of the world's, Asia's and India's largest steel plants, named the Bokaro Steel Plant. It was established in 1964. It has its headquarters in Bokaro itself. This plant is now a part of Steel Authority of India (SAIL). This plant is located at Marafari. Steel industry is largest industry field in the city of Bokaro. approximately 1/4 or 2/4 of the city covers the steel plant. Many peoples of Bokaro are working here. Here is another steel company namely Vedanta Electrosteel Casting Ltd. It is a company headquartered and based in Kolkata. It has set up its plant at Chas.

The Bokaro Steel Plant was established with the collaboration of Soviet Union when the first prime minister of India, Jawaharlal Nehru, desired to establish a steel plant in the region. Bokaro Steel Plant expansion to extend its capacity from 7.5 metric tonnes before 2011. Vedanta Electrosteel Castings Limited - A Kolkata-based water pipe manufacturer acquired 2,500 acres (10 square kilometres) of land 18 kilometres (11 miles) from the city and has erected its 2.2 MTPA steel plant. The company has invested close to Rs 80 Bn (US$1.6 Bn) on this project which was operational from 2010.

It is the second biggest steel manufacturer in Bokaro behind SAIL's Bokaro Steel Plant.

Sundaram Steel located at Balidih is another steel producer in the city. It is located at Balidih Industrial Area. Tannu Tools Pvt Ltd is a manufacturer of tools in Boakro. It have its plant at Balidih Industrial Area, Balidih.

The city has presence of Steel Authority of India Ltd., Oil and Natural Gas Corporation, Vedanta amongst others. Steel Authority of India Limited - The economy of the city is primarily depended on the integrated steel plant established by Steel Authority of India.

== Oil, fuels, petroleum and gases ==
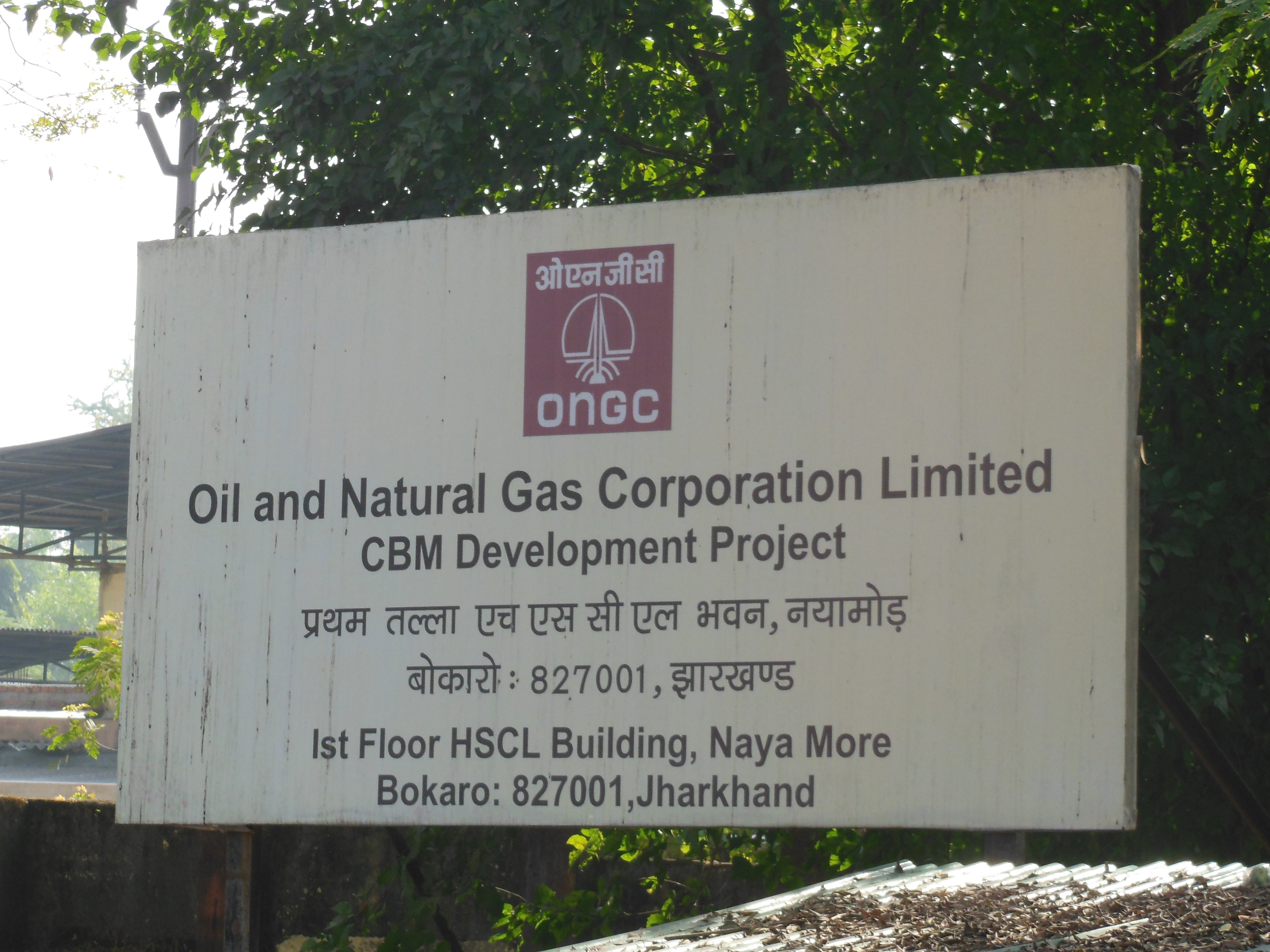
ONGC, Bokaro Steel City

Oil and Gas Industry is the second major industry in Bokaro behind its steel industry. It has major presence of oil and gas. ONGC Bokaro operates the Bokaro Coal Bed Methan. Bokaro Steel City have its office at Sector 4 and its plant at Marafari. ONGC is a manufacturer, and it produces oil and gas. This company has its headquarters in Delhi/New Delhi. This is one of the biggest oil and gas companies of India. This company produce a major part of economy of Bokaro. Hindustan Petroleum is one of the largest petroleum companies in whole of India. In Balidih there is a depot of Hindustan Petroleum. There is also a bottling plant known as IOC Bottling Plant is located at Balidih. Now Bharat Petroleum will set up a LPG bottling plant and other bottling plant in Balidih, Bokaro Steel City.

ONGC Bokaro operates the Bokaro Coal Bed Methane (CBM) block BK-CBM-2001/1 with 80 per cent stake while the remaining 20 per cent is with Indian Oil Corp (IOC). It plans to invest ₨ 8.23 billion from 2017 to 2018 to achieve a peak production of 0.9 million standard cubic meters per day. Bharat Petroleum Corporation Limited - BPCL will set up a LPG bottling plant and POL (petroleum, oil and lubricants) terminal in Bokaro, the foundation stone of which was laid on 11 August 2019.

GAIL's Jagadishpur–Haldia–Bokaro-Dhamra Pipeline (JHBDPL), one of the largest gas pipeline projects of India, is expected to be completed in 2020 and will run through the area. In January 2020, Triveni Groups proposed the development of Kaushal Triveni Mega Food Park in nearby Chandankiyari.

== Railway ==
A rail wheel factory is also under development near Damoderpur village, about 35 kilometres from Bokaro, in a joint venture with Indian Railways and Government of Jharkhand.

== Cement ==
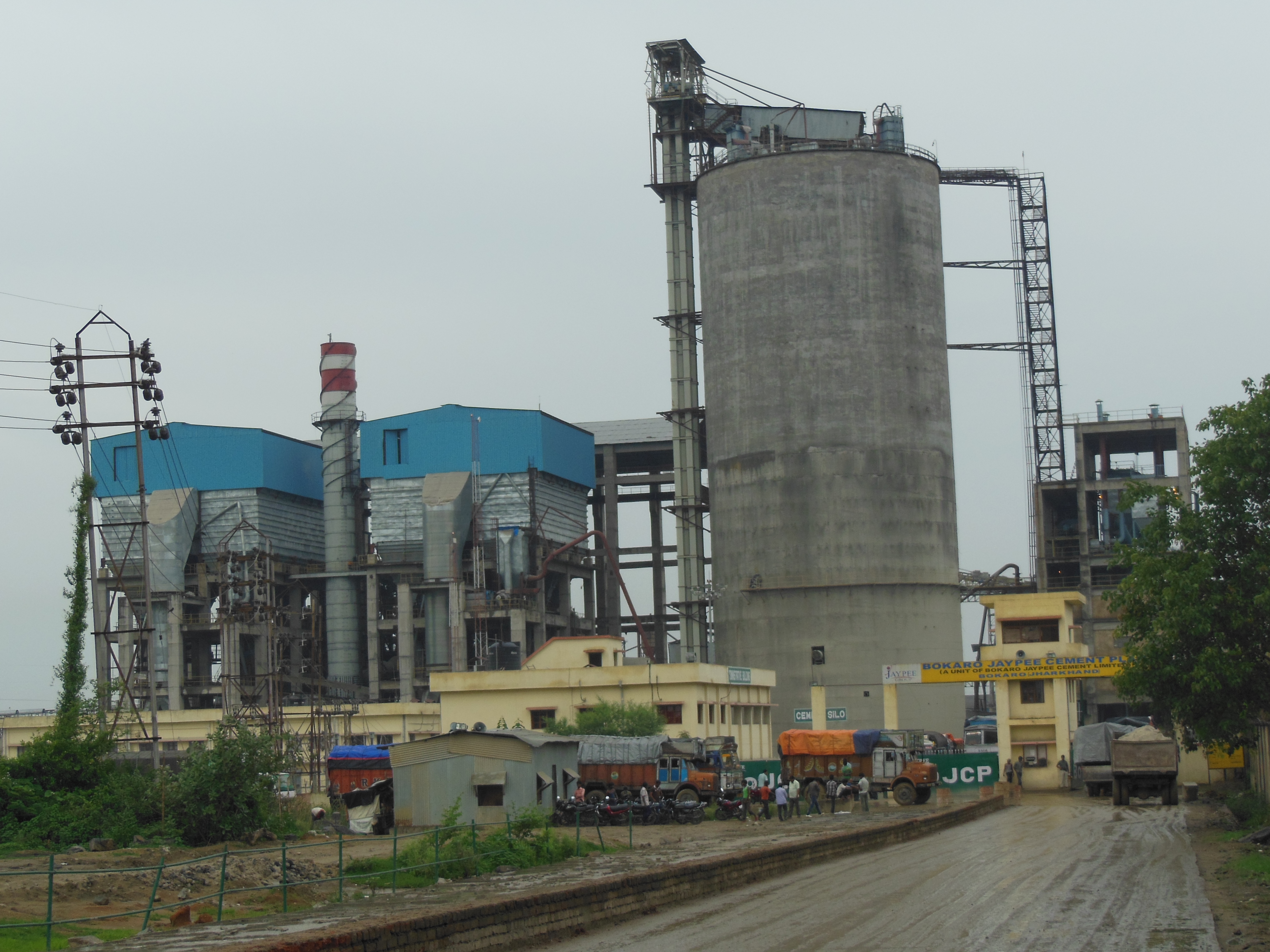
Jaypee Cement

Cement Industry is the third biggest and largest industry in Bokaro Steel City behind steel industry and oil industry. Here is the Dalmia Group's cement factory namely Dalmaia East Cement Bharat Limited (DECBL). Its cement plant is at Balidih. Dalmia Group is an Indian grouping many other companies one such part is Dalmaia East Cement Bharat Ltd. Another cement factory in the whole city is JP Cement which nearer to Dalmia Cement and this cement plant itself located at Marafari, Bokaro Steel City. JP Cement is another second largest plant of cement in Bokaro behind Dalmia East Cement Bharat Limited. Both the cement factory are large cement factories.

== Crops and agriculture ==
Once a small grain trading hub of the region, Chas became notable during the Second World War when the British government used it as a base to supply soldiers fighting in the eastern front against the Japanese. In the 1960s, the Government of India decided to establish the Bokaro Steel Plant nearby, which enhanced the economic activity of the region.

== Food processing ==
Bihar State Milk Co-operative Federation has a processing plant at Sector - 12. It is another major player in the local economy. It is an economic part of the Bokaro's twin city and a major suburb Chas.

In January 2020, Triveni Groups proposed the development of Kaushal Triveni Mega Food Park in nearby Chandankiyari. Here is also floor mills such as Kamal Flour Mills etc.

== Chemical ==
RMP is a chemical manufacturer. It is located in Bokaro Steel City at the area of Marafari. It is one of the Chemical manufacturers in the whole city. It is nearer to big companies such as Bokaro Steel Plant and BPSCL Power Plant.

== Retail, trade and commerce ==
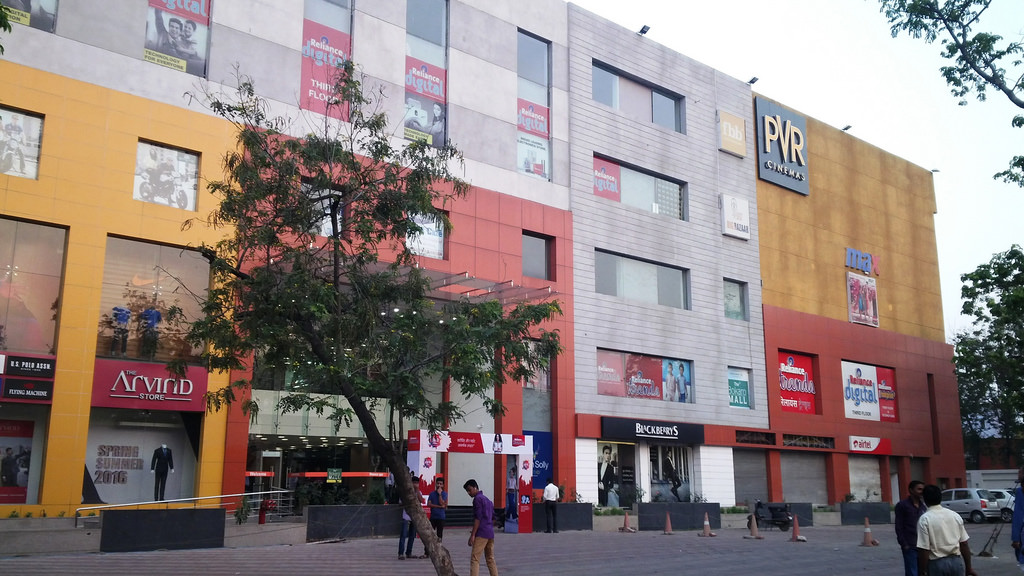
The Bokaro Mall at sector 3

The Bokaro Mall in Sector 3 is the shopping mall of the city along with Harsh Vardhan Plaza and City center. Sector 4 is the main commercial area of the city. It is nearer to Marafari. Sector 4 has many shopping complexes around it. City Centre is the main Central Business District of the city. Here are also banks, shopping complexes, playgrounds, etc. Here is also temple Jagannath Temple and Jama Masjid at Sector 4. This place is nearer to Marafari. Some parts Bokaro Steel Plant is came under Sector 4 itself. Here is many schools in this area. One of them being DAV Public School. It also has other branches also. Chinmaya Vidyalayas are other schools. It has branches in other cities like Hyderabad etc.

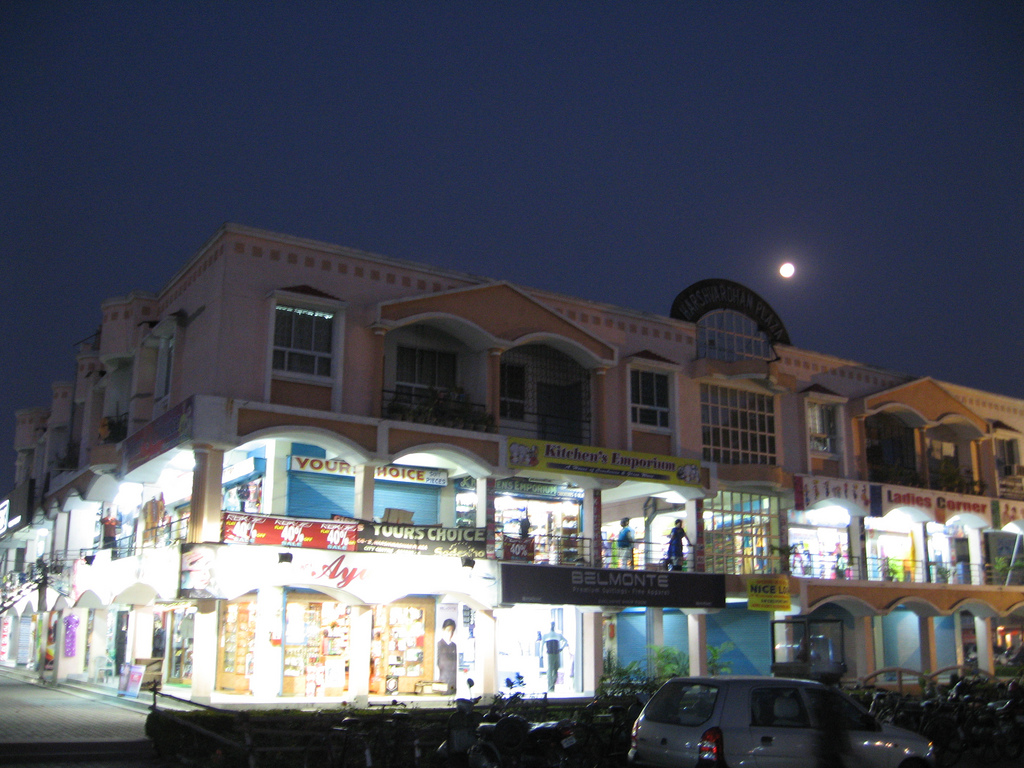
Harsh Vardhan Plaza at Sector 4, Bokaro

The city center is the prominent central business district of Bokaro Steel City and one of the most developed and planned CBD in Jharkhand and Eastern India Recent years have seen it grow more than threefold in size. The difference of this market and most other major markets in Indian cities happens to be the planning of the market. There is ample parking space, and the approach roads, as well as those inside the market are wide. The place houses almost all major Indian banks, has various shops in the city for clothing, electronics, and the best food joints. It used to be home for the only cinema theaters in the city, but only two of them (Jeetendra and Pali Plaza) is operational now. The latest comers to the market are coaching institutes, small clinics, and hospitals. Their rate of growth shows the demand these services have in the city.

=== Wholesale ===
Chas is especially well known for its wholesale markets. As such, the city is home to many small and medium-sized businesses, which are overseen by apex trade associations, like the Bokaro Chamber of Commerce and Industries, Jainamore Chamber of Commerce and Jharkhand Small Tiny Service Business Enterprises Association. In recent years, Chas has also had an influx of retail and supermarket chains (like V-Mart, Citi Style, etc.) and vehicle showrooms of KTM, Honda, Hero, Maruti Suzuki, JCB, Yamaha, TVS, Mahindra.

== Utilities ==
BPSCL Power Plant is a power plant in Bokaro Steel City. This is a coal-based thermal power plant located in Bokaro district. The power plant is owned by Bokaro Power Supply Company Limited, a joint venture between Steel Authority of India and Damodar Valley Corporation. It supplies power and process steam to Bokaro Steel Plant and surplus power to grid.

== Future projects ==
|SAIL-POSCO JV Steel Plant: Steel minister Sri Virbhadra Singh has announced another new steel plant for Bokaro as part of a joint venture with Posco and SAIL by using FINEX technologies for high quality steel. The capacity of the plant will be 1.5 mt, establish in BSP periphery of 500 acres (2.0 km^{2}) will be built in Bokaro.

Bharat Petroleum Corporation Limited - BPCL will set up a LPG bottling plant and POL (petroleum, oil and lubricants) terminal in Bokaro, the foundation stone of which was laid on 11 August 2019 at Marafari in Bokaro.

Software Technology Parks of India - STPI will set up an IT Park in Bokaro soon.

== Markets and business districts ==
The main central business districts of the city are:

- City Centre, Bokaro
- Sector 4 (Bokaro)
- Chas

== Economic zones and areas of Bokaro ==
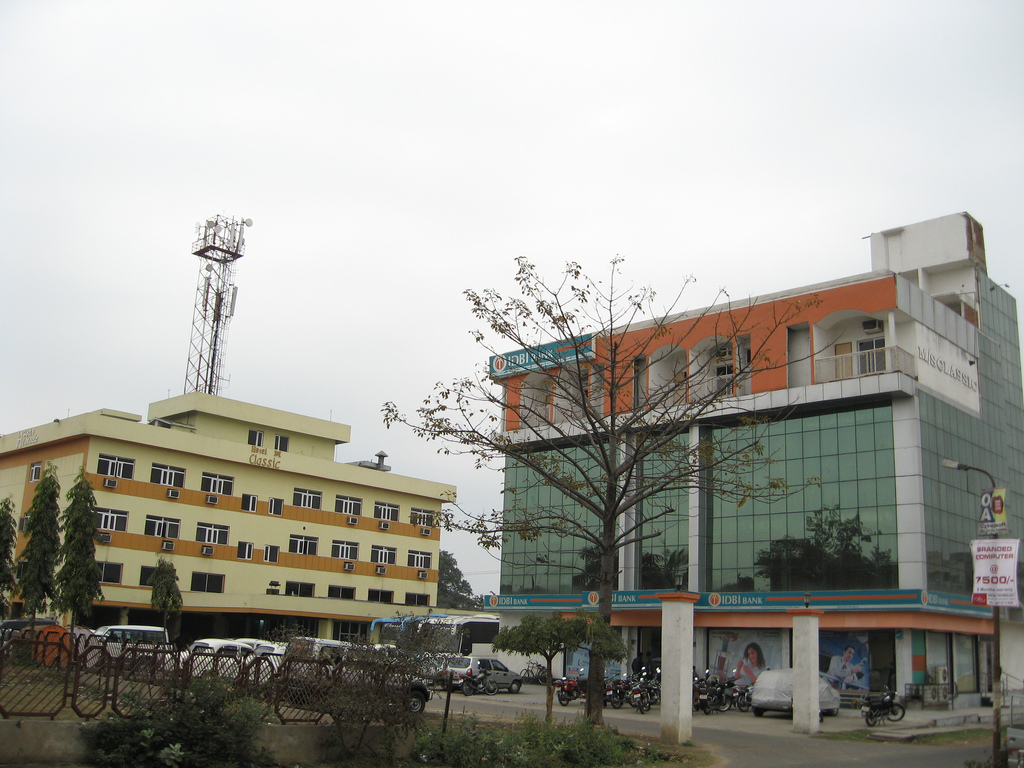
City Centre at Sector 4

=== Sector 4 ===
- Sector 4 is the main commercial area of the city. It is nearer to Marafari. Sector 4 has many shopping complexes around it. Here is also temple Jagannath Temple and Jama Masjid at Sector 4. This place is nearer to Marafari. Some parts of Bokaro Steel Plant came under Sector 4 itself. Here is many schools in this area. One of them being DAV Public School. It also has other branches also. Chinmaya Vidyalayas are other schools. It has branches in other cities like Hyderabad etc.

=== City Centre ===
- City Centre is the main Central Business District of the city. Here is also banks, shopping complexes, playgrounds, etc.

=== Marafari ===
- Marafari is the main industrial hub and area of the city, here are the companies of Bokaro Steel City.

These companies include

- Bokaro Steel Plant
- Steel Authority of India (SAIL)
- Dalmia East Cement Bharat Ltd
- JP Cement
- Vedanta Electrosteel Castings Ltd
- BPSCL Power Plant

=== Balidih ===
- Balidih is one of the major neighbourhoods of the city. It is one of the major industrial hubs of Bokaro along with Marafari. Here is the Holy Cross School located at this area. Here is the tourist spot known as Garga Dam.

=== Chas ===
- Chas is a city and neighbourhood of Bokaro. It has a developed economy. It has a history during World War II and its economic history also. Chas is especially well known for its wholesale markets. As such, the city is home to many small and medium-sized businesses, which are overseen by apex trade associations, like the Bokaro Chamber of Commerce and Industries, Jainamore Chamber of Commerce and Jharkhand Small Tiny Service Business Enterprises Association. In recent years, Chas has also had an influx of retail and supermarket chains (like V-Mart, Citi Style, etc.) and vehicle showrooms of KTM, Honda, Hero, Maruti Suzuki, JCB, Yamaha, TVS, Mahindra.

=== Balidih Industrial Area ===
- A special economic zone in the city at Balidih.

== See also ==
- Jamshedpur
- Economy of Jharkhand State
- Economy of Jamshedpur
- Economy of Deoghar
