= Adityapur Industrial Area =

- Suburb
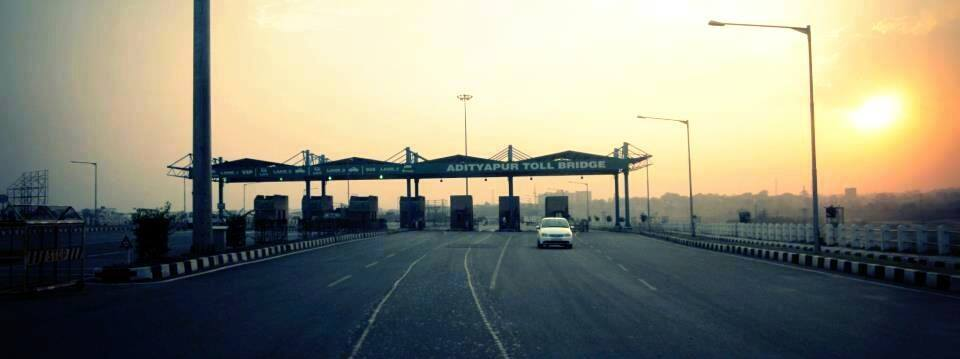
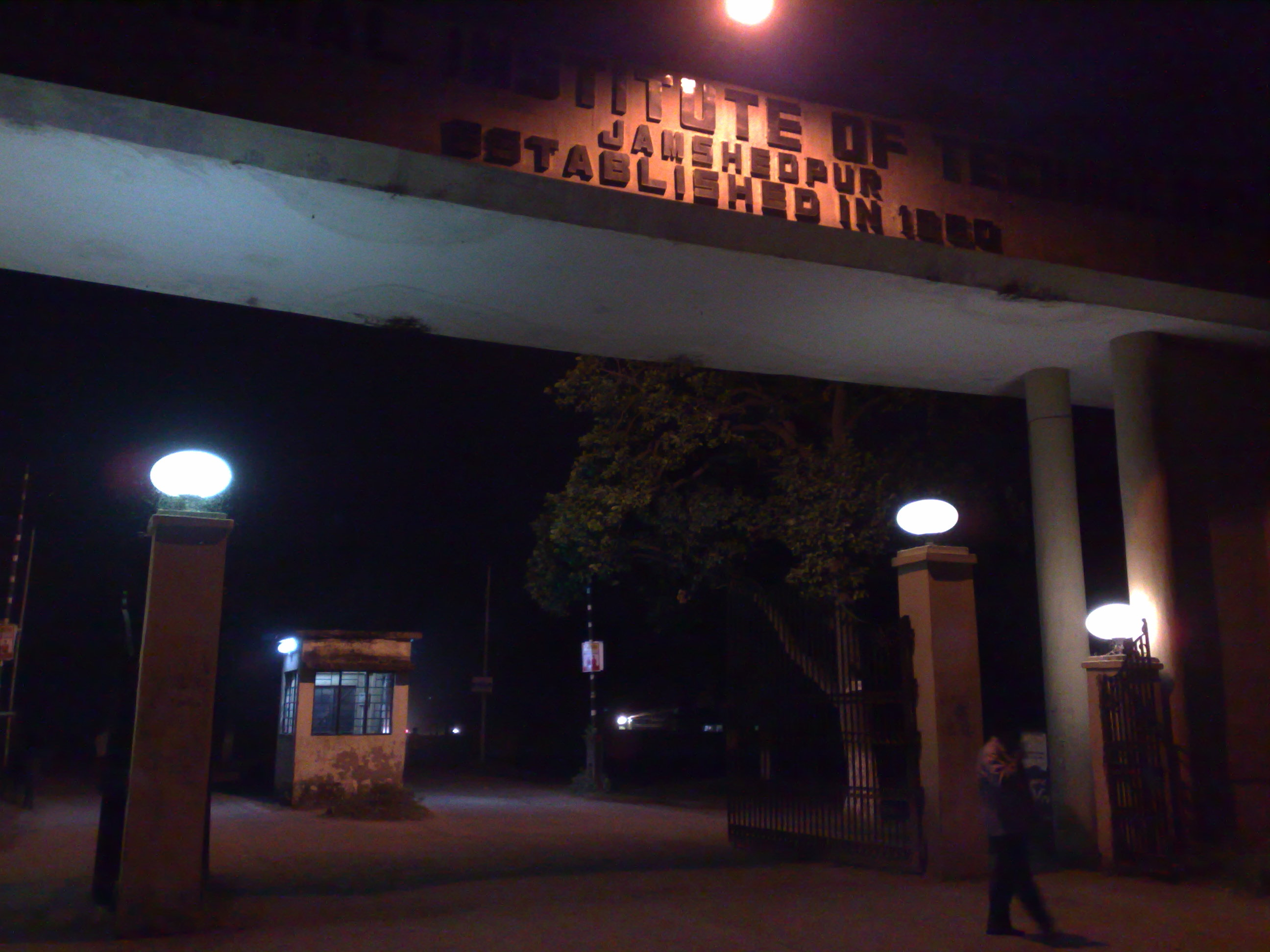
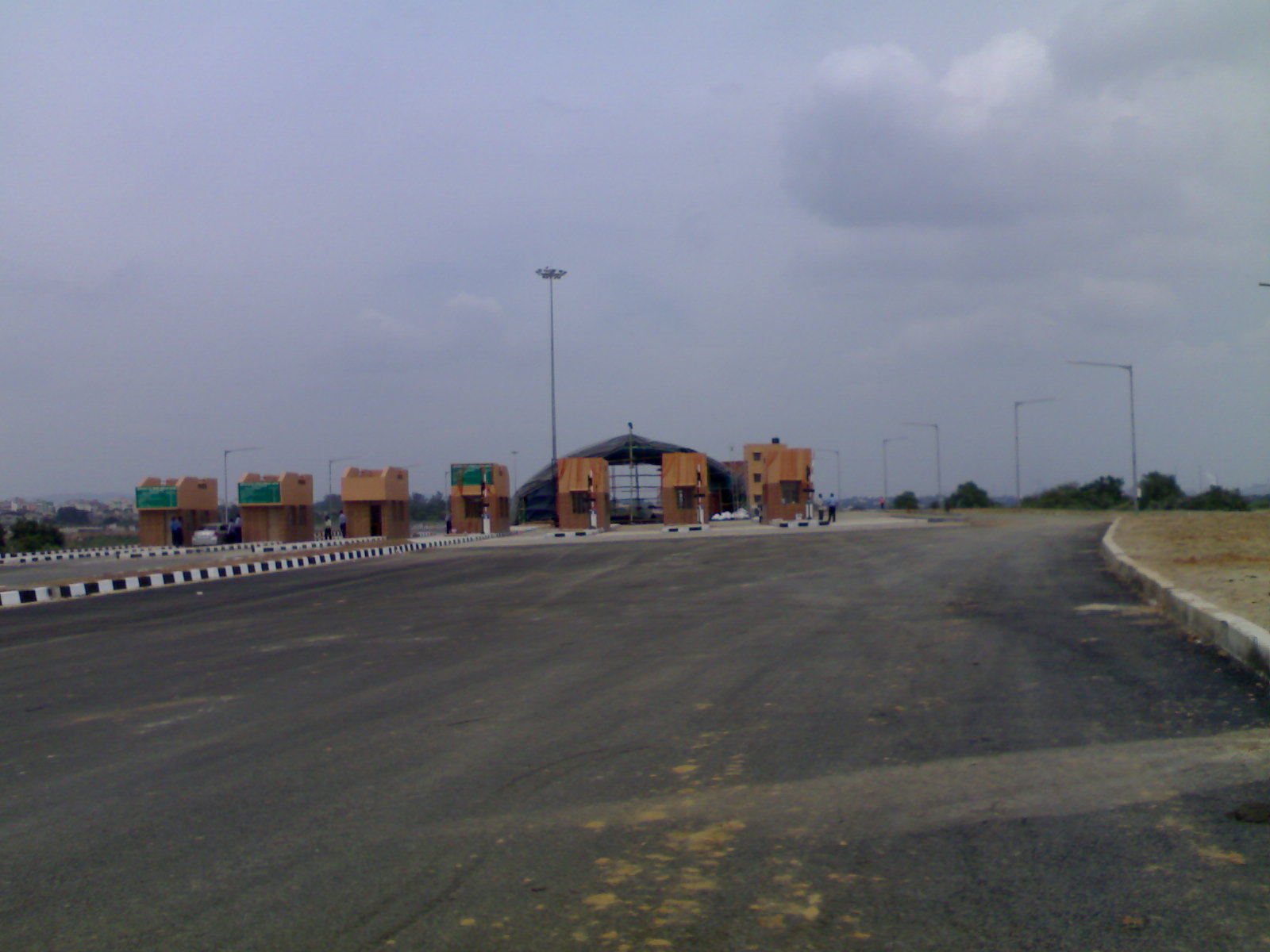
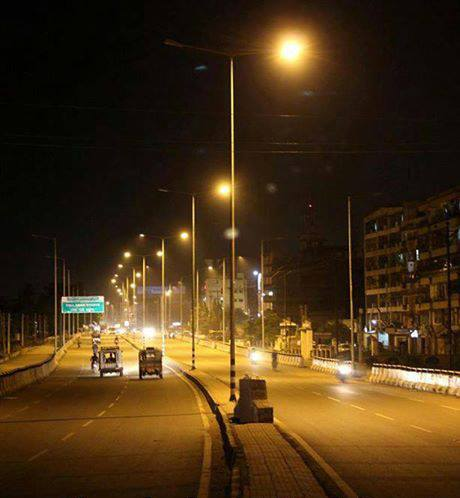
- Adityapur Toll Bridge Marine Drive
- Interactive map of Adityapur Industrial Area
- Coordinates: 22.7831°N 86.1377°E
- Country: India
- State or Union territory: Jharkhand
- City/Metro/Megacity: Jamshedpur

Languages
  - Official: Hindi, Urdu

Adityapur Industrial Area also known as Adityapur Industrial Area City short form AIA or AIA City is an industrial hub and an Industrial, technological, engineering district located at Adityapur, Jamshedpur, Jharkhand, India. Adityapur Industrial Area is actually an industrial belt, which lies in Adityapur. It is a Special Economic Zone.

== Location ==
Located at Adityapur, which is city and a part of the city Jamshedpur.

== Infrastructure and industry ==
It is one of the biggest industrial belts not only in Eastern region but the entire India. Prior to Noida it was the biggest industrial belt of the country. The region mainly houses a large number of Small and Medium scale in industry with some Large scale industries as well. The Adityapur Industrial Area Development Authority is the governing body of the region and looks after the development of the industrial region. The region has as over 1000 industrial units as of 2010. The region gives direct employment to around 28000 people. The average annual production of the belt is in excess of Rs. 36 billion at present.

== Education ==
- NIT Jamshedpur
- Rantech ITI College

== See also ==
- Economy of Jamshedpur
- Economy of Bokaro
- Marafari
- Electronic City
- HITEC City
