= Economy of Jamshedpur =

Economy of the Indian state

Jamshedpur is the largest urban conglomeration in the state of Jharkhand, India and is also the first well-planned industrial city of India, founded by late Jamshedji Nusserwanji Tata. It is also known as Steel City and Tatanagar or simply Tata. In terms of economy Jamshedpur has second largest economy after Dhanbad in Jharkhand.

Jamshedpur is predominantly an industrial city with major emphasis on core and heavy industries. Jamshedpur being the first industrial city of India has set benchmarks and trendsetters for the development of other industrial cities like Durgapur, Bokaro, Bhilai etc. It houses some of the biggest companies of India with a majority of them being of Tata Group of companies. It is also the headquarters of a large no. of companies located here.

The setting up of Tata Steel had paved in the way for the creation of the city and Tata Steel being a pivot had led to a huge industrial outgrowth in the region. Today Jamshedpur boasts of a wide variety of products like Steel, commercial vehicles, cement, power, construction equipment, industrial equipment, vehicle engines, tin-plate with a huge number of products produced by small and medium scale industries located in the industrial region of Adityapur.

== Iron and Steel ==
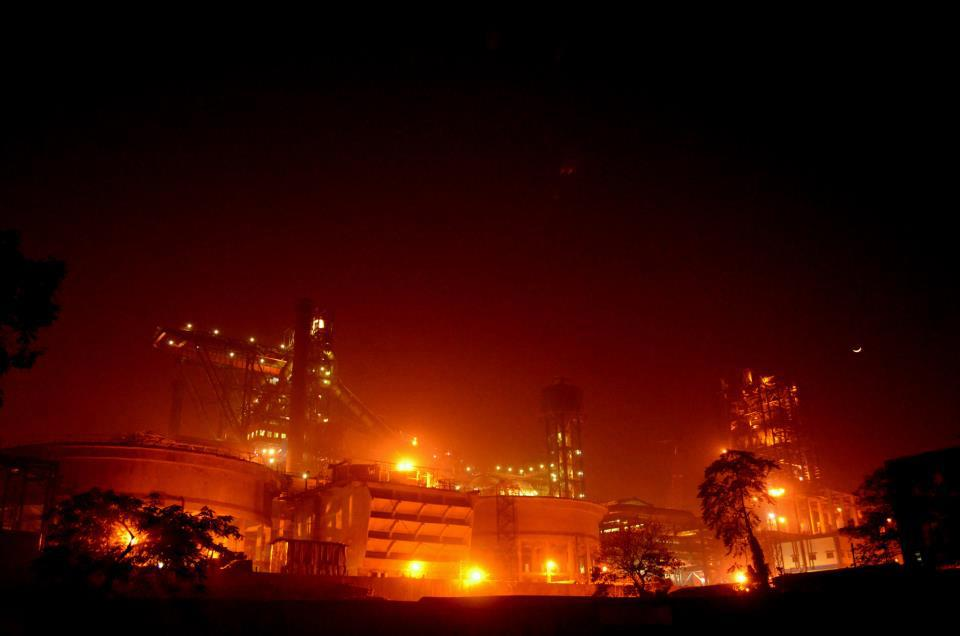
Tata Steel in Jamshedpur at night

Tata Steel (TISCO) - The largest industry/factory in Jamshedpur is that of Tata Steel (the erstwhile Tata Iron and Steel Company or TISCO). Tata Steel is the largest iron and steel producing plant in India, as well as the oldest. It is situated at the center of the city and occupies approximately 1/5 of the entire city area. It acts as a pivotal center for the industries of the city of Jamshedpur with a large number of them having direct or indirect linkages with it. The plant in Jamshedpur is considered to be one of the best not only in India but the entire world. It has won numerous awards for that like World’s Best Steel Maker for three times by World Steel Dynamics, Prime Minister's Trophy for Best Integrated Steel Plant for a record five times, world-renowned Deming Prize for major advances in quality improvement any many more.

== Automobile and Machinery ==
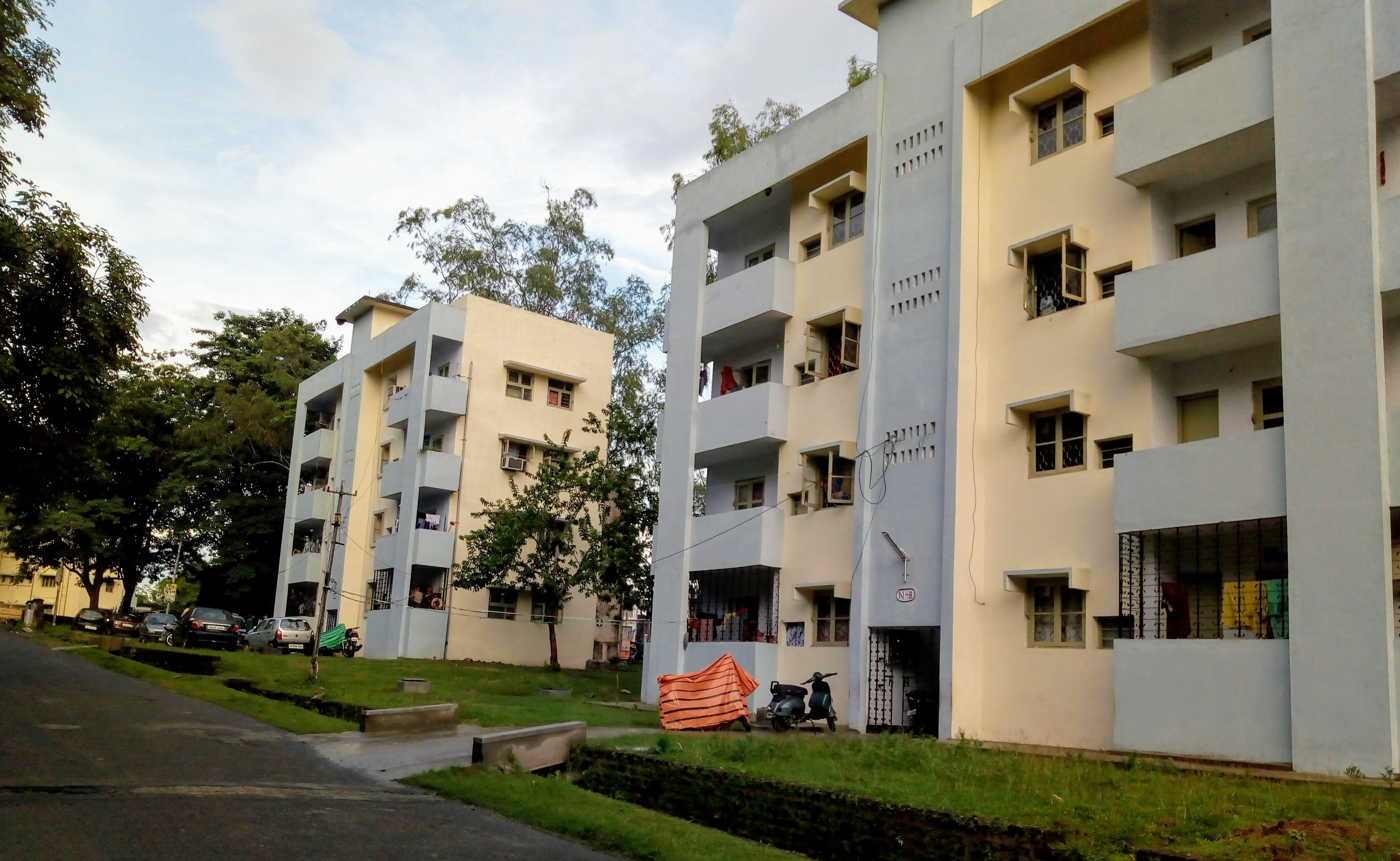
Telco Colony is a major industrial hub of city. This place have Tata Motors. It is a township by Tata Motors.

Tata Motors is the second main and major industry in Jamshedpur. It was set up in Jamshedpur in 1945. It is at Telco Colony. This is the first plant of Tata Motors. The plant covers a major part of Telco Colony. It is one of the largest plants of Tata Motors. This plant is making commercial vehicles.

India's first tank was built by Tata Motors in Jamshedpur itself. And it was used in World War - II. Telco Colony is a township by Tata Motors. This place have each and every facilities, as it is one of the most developed areas in Jamshedpur.

THCM Erstwhile TELCON stands for Tata Hitachi Construction Machinery Company Limited, it is a JV of Tata Motors, which holds 40% share, and Hitachi Construction Machinery Co. Ltd, Japan holding the balance 60%. The company commenced manufacturing of construction equipment in 1961, as a division of TELCO. In 1984, it entered into a technical collaboration with HCM, Japan for manufacturing state of the art hydraulic excavators. The facility in Jamshedpur is spread over 30 acres of land and started operations in 1961.

== Air and Gases ==
Linde India was built in 1998 as BOC (British Oxygen Corporation) India and is one of Asia's largest air separation plants with a daily capacity of 1250 tonnes. Its products include all types of Industrial and Process gases like liquefied oxygen, nitrogen, argon etc. The plant primarily caters to the needs of Tata Steel and is located in Burmamines, Jamshedpur. In 2013 BOC India rebranded as Linde India.

Praxair is an American company specializing in production of Industrial and Process gases. Its plant in Jamshedpur specially caters to the needs of Tata Steel and produces gases like oxygen, nitrogen and argon for industrial purposes. The company has two separate units one inside the plant while the other is just beside it in Garamnala, Bistupur. The plant in Garamnala was the newer of the two being built after demolition of some of the residential quarters of Tata Steel in 2008.

The new plant would have a capacity to produce 1,800 tonnes of oxygen and 1,250 tonnes of nitrogen per day. The existing plant on the Tata Steel works premises produces 1,448 tonnes of industrial gases (including oxygen, nitrogen and argon) per day. Praxair as of 2008 had plans to set up another unit at Usha Martin, Jamshedpur.

== Chemicals and Cements ==
JAMIPOL stands for Jamshedpur Injection Powder and was formerly known by this name. It was built under a joint venture company promoted by Tata Steel, SKW Stahl Metallurgie AG (Germany) and Tai Industries (Bhutan). It is involved in the production and marketing of de-sulphurising compounds (DC) and offers de-sulphurisation products for the steel industry. Its plant is located in Burma Mines, Jamshedpur and is also headquartered there. The plant in Jamshedpur has a designed capacity of 45000 tpa of DC per year.

Nuvoco Vistas Corp. Ltd. (Formerly Lafarge India) is a cement plant located in Jojobera, Jamshedpur. It was earlier called Tata Cements but was brought up by French giant Lafarge in November 1999. The plant has facilities of Cement Grinding unit with separate circuits for clinker and slag grinding and Vertical Cement Mill. And now it is Asia's largest Cement Grinding Unit. The plant has a capacity of 4.6 MTPA of Cement Portland Slag Cement (PSC) and Portland Pozzolana Cement (PPC) with famous premium brand "CONCRETO" and "Duraguard". In April 2017 Lafarge India rebranded as Nuvoco Vistas Corporation Ltd as Lafarge sold its Indian counterpart to Nirma Ltd.

== Power and energy ==
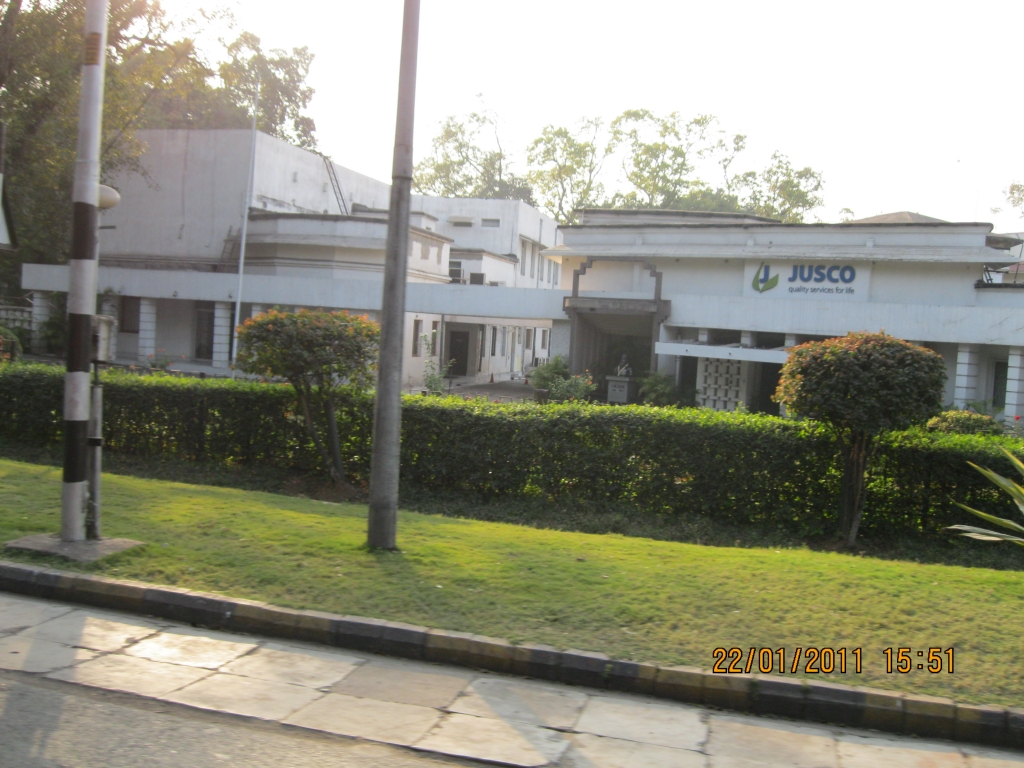
Office of JUSCO

Jamshedpur Utilities and Service Company (JUSCO) is an urban infrastructure service provider mainly specializing in township management services. It was carved out of Tata Steel from its Town Services Division in 2004. The company is headquartered in Jamshedpur itself. Initially the company used to only look after the city of Jamshedpur but now has projects all over India like Kolkata, Mysore, Haldia etc.

At Jamshedpur JUSCO provides civic services and maintains the city water supply, electricity supply, parks, gardens, roads, Tata Steels employee accommodation, sewage network and schools. It runs round the clock single call centre where citizens can log any service requests of complaints and the same. JUSCO is also a power distribution licensee for Seraikela-Kharasawan in Jharkhand.

Tata Power is operating one of its plant here which is Jojobera Power Plant located in Jojobera, Telco colony. This is a large power plant. This power plant is supplying electricity to Tata Steel in Jamshedpur. Tata Power has its office in Jamshedpur.

== Economic Zones ==
Economic zones of Jamshedpur:

- Adityapur Industrial Area is actually an industrial belt, which lies in the area of Adityapur which is the satellite town of the city Jamshedpur. It is located at a distance of about 8 km from Tatanagar railway station and 8 km from Jamshedpur Airport. It is one of the biggest industrial belts not only in Eastern region but the entire India. Prior to Noida it was the biggest industrial belt of the country. The region mainly houses a large number of Small and Medium scale in industry with some Large scale industries as well. The Adityapur Industrial Area Development Authority is the governing body of the region and looks after the development of the industrial region. The region has as over 1000 industrial units as of 2010. The region gives direct employment to around 28000 people. The average annual production of the belt is in excess of Rs. 3,600 crores at present. But due to COVID pandemic 2020 approximately 80% jobs a gone.
