= Chira Chas =

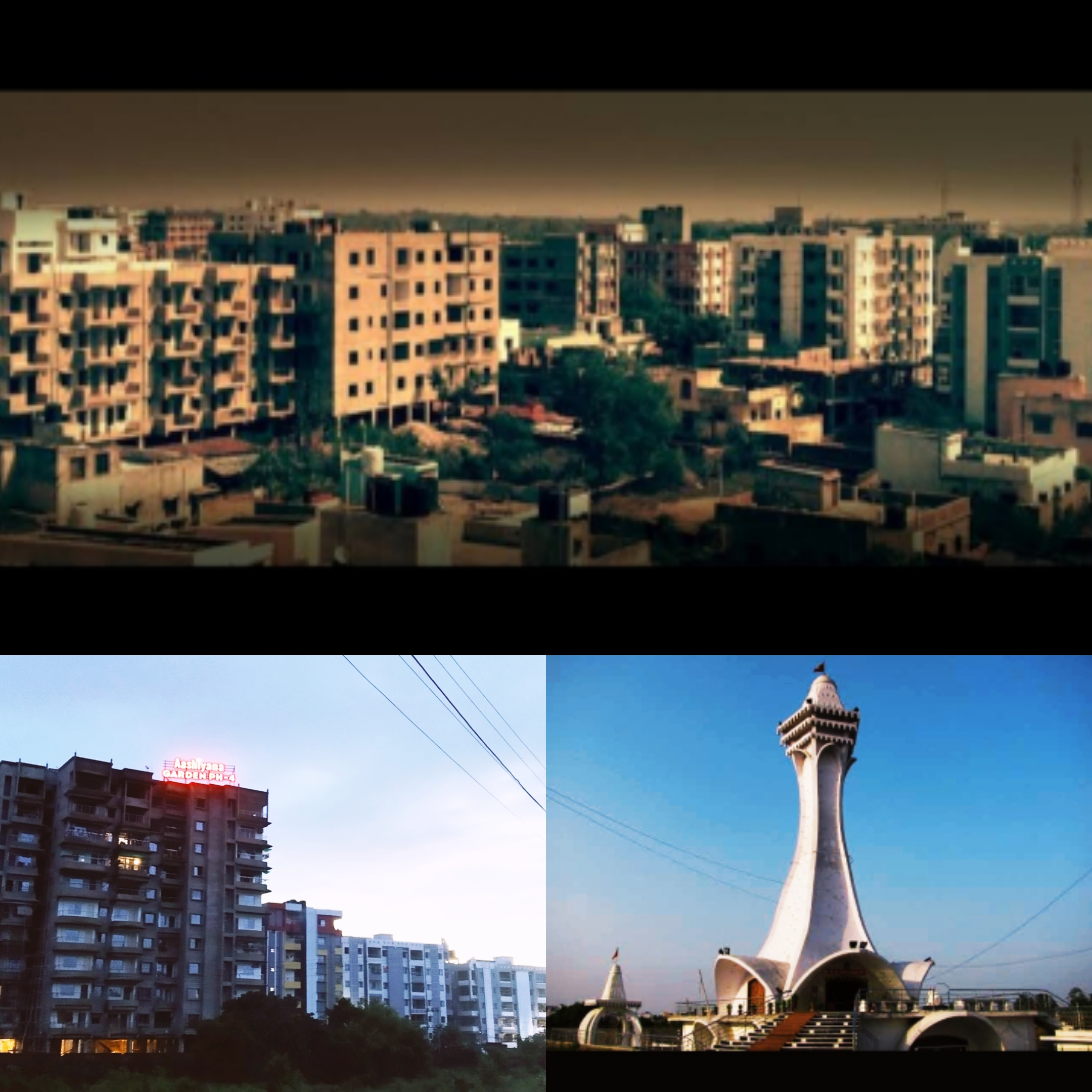
- Sri Sri Kalika Maharani Temple at Kalika Vihar at Chira Chas Bokaro, Sunrise view from Chira chas

- Location in Jharkhand, India Chira Chas (India)
- Coordinates: 23.65°N 86.18°E
- Country: India
- State: Jharkhand
- District: Bokaro

Government
  - Body: Chas Municipal Corporation
- Elevation: 560 m (1,840 ft)

Population
  - Total: 50,000

Languages
  - Official: khortha, Hindi, Bengali
- Time zone: UTC+5:30 (IST)
- PIN: 827015
- Telephone code: 916542
- Vehicle registration: JH 09

Chira Chas, part of Chas municipality (Chas Ward #2), in the state of Jharkhand, India is a suburb of Bokaro Steel City and Chas.Chira Chas is one of the fastest-growing urban regions in Jharkhand It is included in the urban area of Bokaro Steel City. Chira Chas is notable for its real estate boom, with many housing projects and Many colonies (Anand Vihar, Kunj Vihar, Chanakya Puri Colony, Great Alexander Colony, Gulshan Enclave and Indrapuri Lane) and integrated townships being built within its scenic environs. Due to close proximity to Bokaro, coupled with an increase in spending capacity of citizens, real estate prices in Chira Chas have gradually increased since 2001.

== History ==
The very first housing projects in Chira chas was commenced as k.k singh colony, after then in the mid-nineties Chira chas saw development of the suburbs various more housing societies. From scattered hamlets to the integrated and modern townships being built today, Chira Chas has come a long way. Chira Chas has seen the development of 10-15 colonies and mini townships over the last few years.

== Geography ==
Chira Chas is located at 23.65°N 86.18°E. It has an average elevation of 210 metres (688 feet). It is situated east of River Garga, from the river till the Damodar River.

== Demographics ==
More than 50 thousand citizens reside at Chira Chas, living in multitude of completed apartments and bungalow. Demographic is essentially composed of retired BSL employees, their families and indigenous population composed of villagers. Due to a booming population, the area has seen a study influx of shopping supermarkets, retail outlets and educational establishments. Proximity to Bokaro Steel City, better quality of life, absolute ownership over residential dwellings are few of the reasons for the increasing population at Chira Chas. Thanks to inherently diverse nature of Bokaro's urban populace, Chira Chas residents hail from different states and regions, epitomizing unity in diversity.

== Things to see ==
- Sri Sri Kalika Maharani Temple - Situated at Kalika Vihar ( at Ashiyana garden, phase 3), this 90 feet tall temple, devoted to Devi Kali Ma, (also known as 'Sri Sri Karunandomayee Maa') is an architectural marvel, in the shape of a flower, with petals forming entrances. This temple is also known as Sri Sri Karunamayee Temple.
- Old Shiva Mandir - Located at the main road of Chira Chas 23.65°N 86.18°E.

== Education ==
Several prominent educational institutions and public schools are located at Chira Chas. Apart from established schools such as Kid Zee play school, Saint Paul Academy, Rainbow Public school, Bachpan play school, College of Management & Computer Education (CMCE - Bokaro) caters to graduate and post graduate education. Established in 1995, CMCE offers BBA, BCA degrees and 100% FREE Skill Development Courses in Computer, Soft Skills, Management, etc. under DGET, Govt. of India Project.

== Places in the vicinity ==
- City Centre, Bokaro - Chira Chas is 2.7 kilometers from City Centre, Bokaro and Bokaro Mall
- St. Xavier's School - 1.5 kilometers from Chira Chas.
- Sree Ayyappa Public School - Within 1 kilometer.
- Aaiyappa Mandir - 700 meters from Chira Chas.
