= Sri Sri Kalika Maharani Temple =

Hindu temple in Bokaro, Chhattisgarh

- श्री श्री मां काली महारानी मंदिर
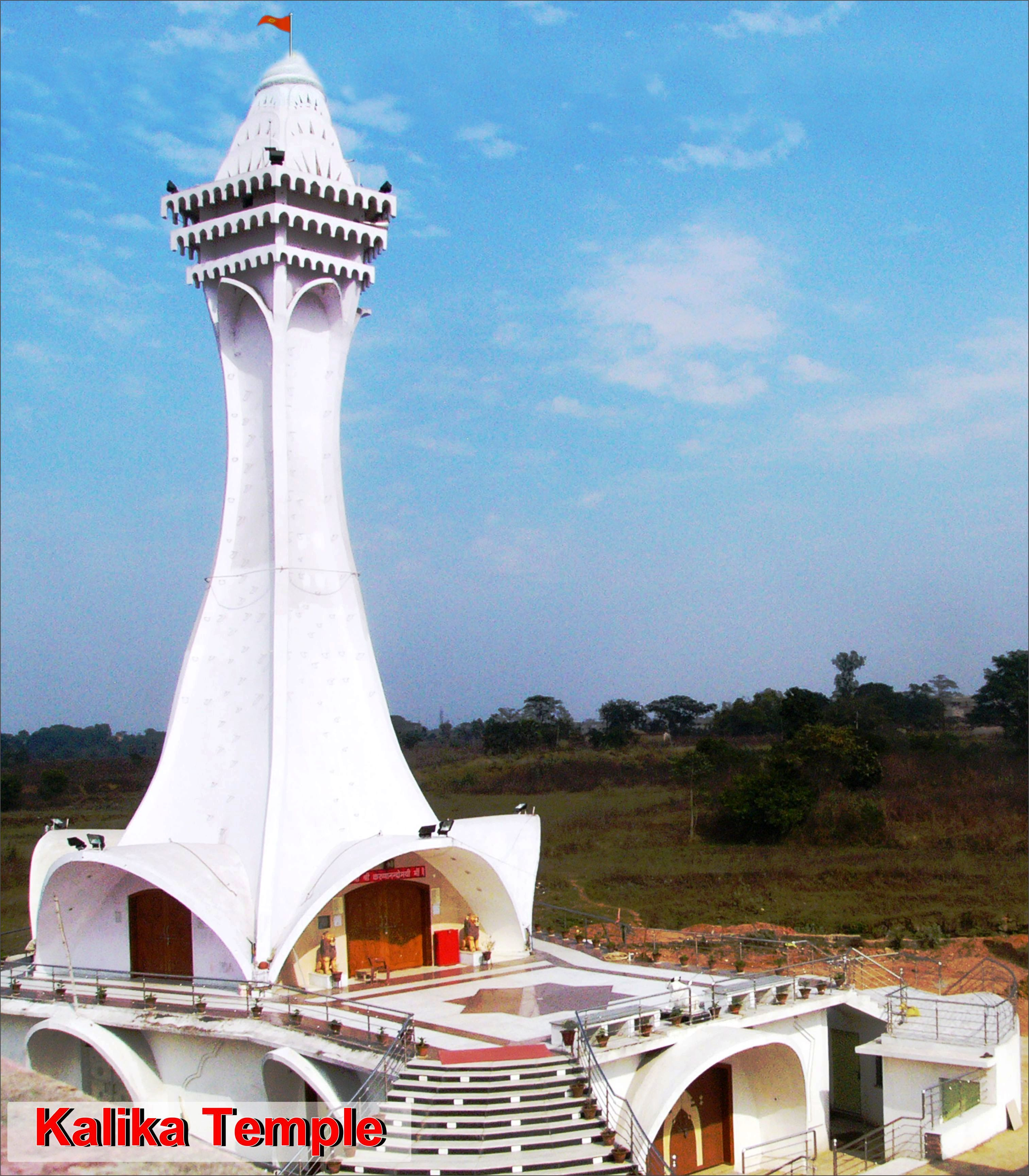
- Kalika temple panorama view

Religion
- Affiliation: Hinduism
- District: Bokaro
- Deity: Kali
- Festivals: Kali Puja, Diwali

Location
- Location: Chira Chas at Bokaro
- State: Jharkhand
- Country: India
- Interactive map of Sri Sri Kalika Maharani Temple
- Coordinates: 23.6559342°N 86.1794213°E

Architecture
- Type: Mandir
- Creator: Shree Shivananda Sinha
- Completed: 2010-2012

Specifications
- Temple: 2
- Monument: 2
- Elevation: 210 m (689 ft)

Sri Sri Kalika Maharani Temple is a Hindu temple in Bokaro in the state of Jharkhand, India is a Hindu temple at Chira Chas, built by Aashiyaan Estate Developers. The temple is spread over half an acre and is dedicated to Goddess Kali. The mini township of Kalika Vihar is named after this temple.

== History ==
The construction of the temple began in July, 2010. It took less than 3 years to complete the entire structure. The temple was opened to public on July 14, 2012. The temple is situated at Kalika Vihar, Aashiyan Garden, Phase - 3, Chira Chas. Before the foundation was laid, a nine-day Ramayana recital was held, along with a religious 'Yagna'. On the map, the temple can be found at 23.65°N 86.17°E. The temple is famous in Jharkhand and its opening was covered by major newspapers. During excavation of the Foundation in the initial phase of construction, laborers found an Indian Cobra which is considered a good omen, symbolizing Lord Shiva. Legend has it, that Goddess Kali grants the wishes of those, who pray at this temple.

== Dimensions ==
The temple is a two storeyed structure with a tall 'Stupa' which is over 90 feet tall. over 50 feet is breadth, the temple is over 160 feet long. The temple is based on a unique design, imitating a lotus flower with five petals. Each petal houses an entrance to the temple. The temple is designed on a pentagonal scheme and has five nodes in its superstructure.

== Temple ==
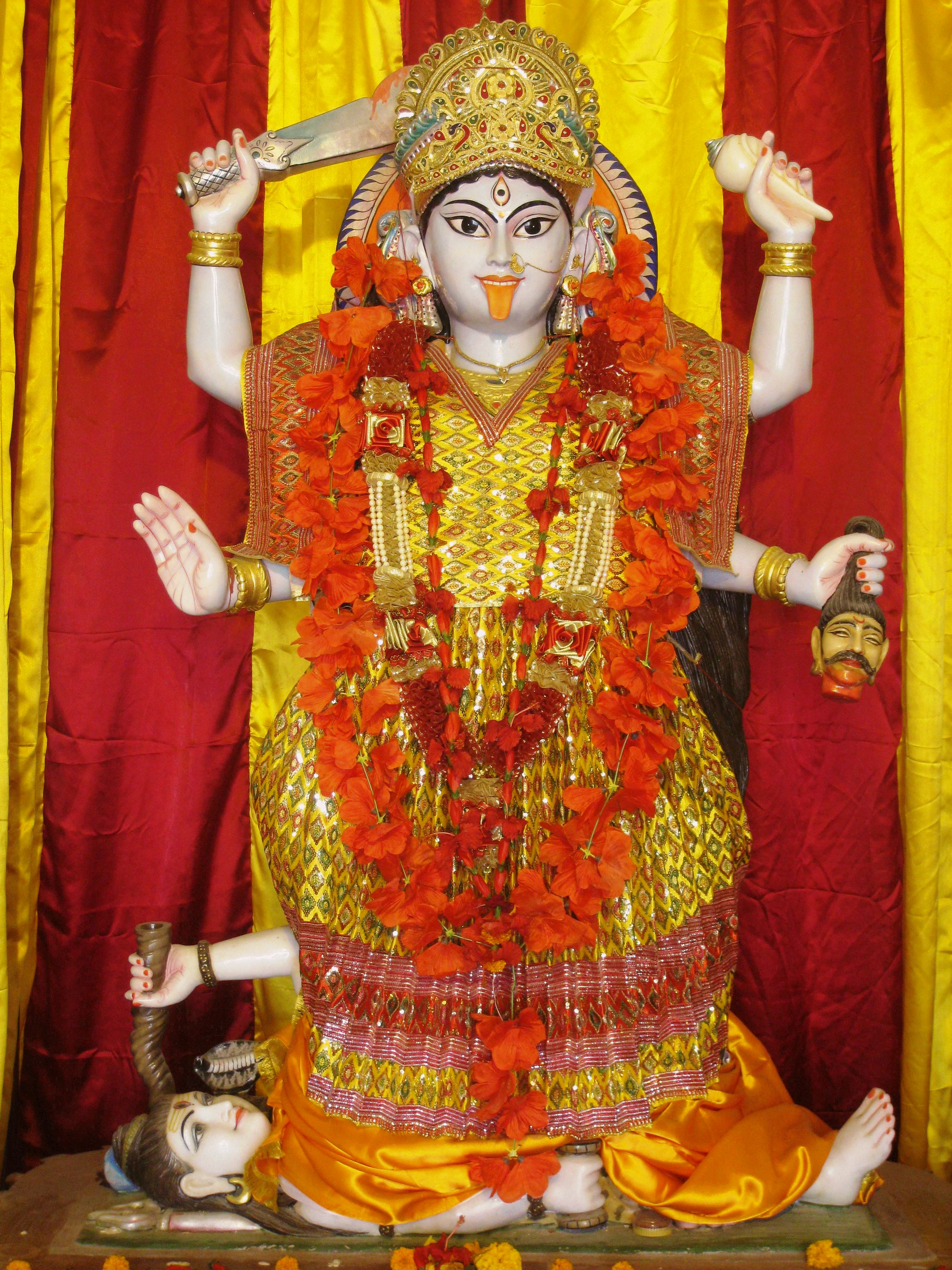
Kalika Ma Idol inside the temple

The main temple houses statues of goddess Ma Kali. The main temple of Kali is based on the first floor, while the basement (over 4000 square feet) would house a large prayer and Yagya hall. The idol is a beautiful representation of Kali in her Sita avatar. A small temple, dedicated to Lord Hanuman, is located at the entrance to the temple. Along with Sri Ram Mandir Temple, at Sector 1, this temple has risen to prominence in Bokaro.

== Facilities ==
The basement prayer hall can be used for Hindu religious ceremonies and would protect the worshipers from the elements. The temple houses a seating area for devotees. A dedicated parking space is provided for the convenience of visitors.

== Directions to the temple ==
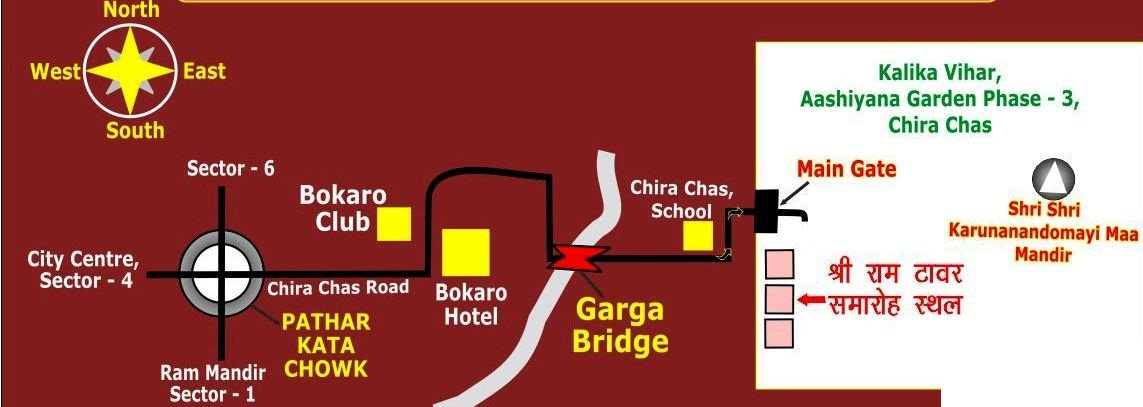
Map to Sri Kalika Maharani Temple, Bokaro

To reach the temple, the devotees should travel towards Bokaro Hotel from Patharkata Chowk. Turn left towards Chinmaya School and turn right by Asha Lata Kendra. Devotees should continue on this road, crossing the Chira Chas bridge. One should then travel straight to Chira Chas school and then turn left. After traveling a distance of 30 feet, one should then turn right (by the board of Kalika Vihar Phase -3), and then enter the Aashiyana Garden/Kalika Vihar Phase - 3 campus where the temple is located.

== Gallery ==
=== Pictorial timeline of construction ===
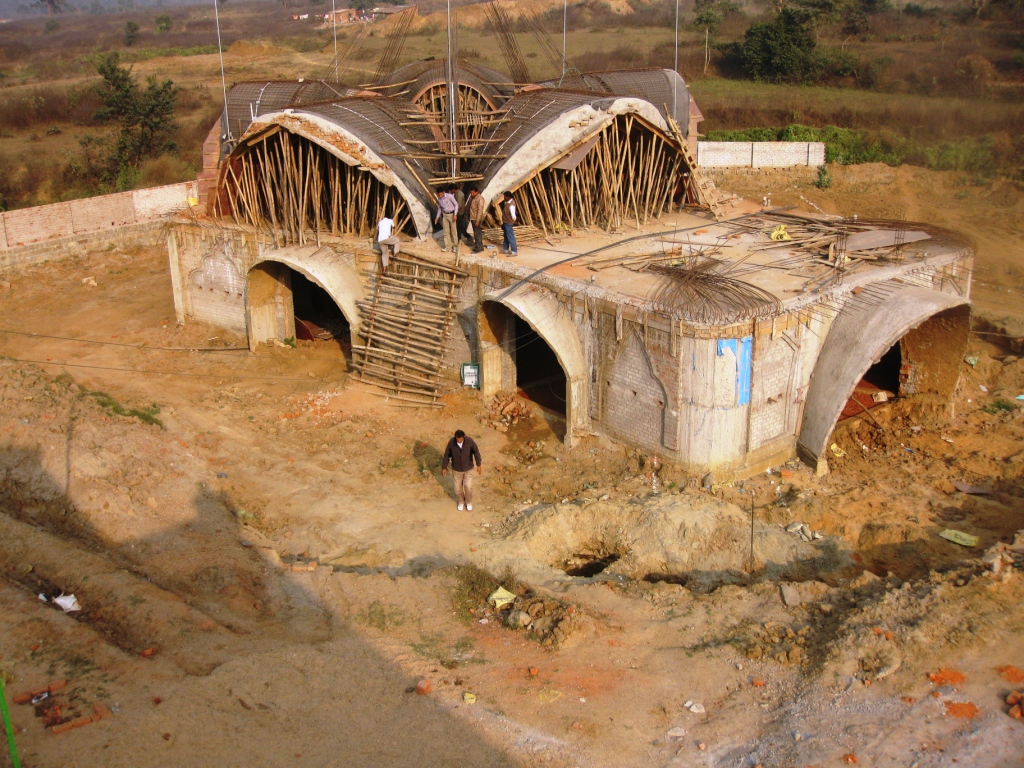
Kalika Temple as in December, 2011

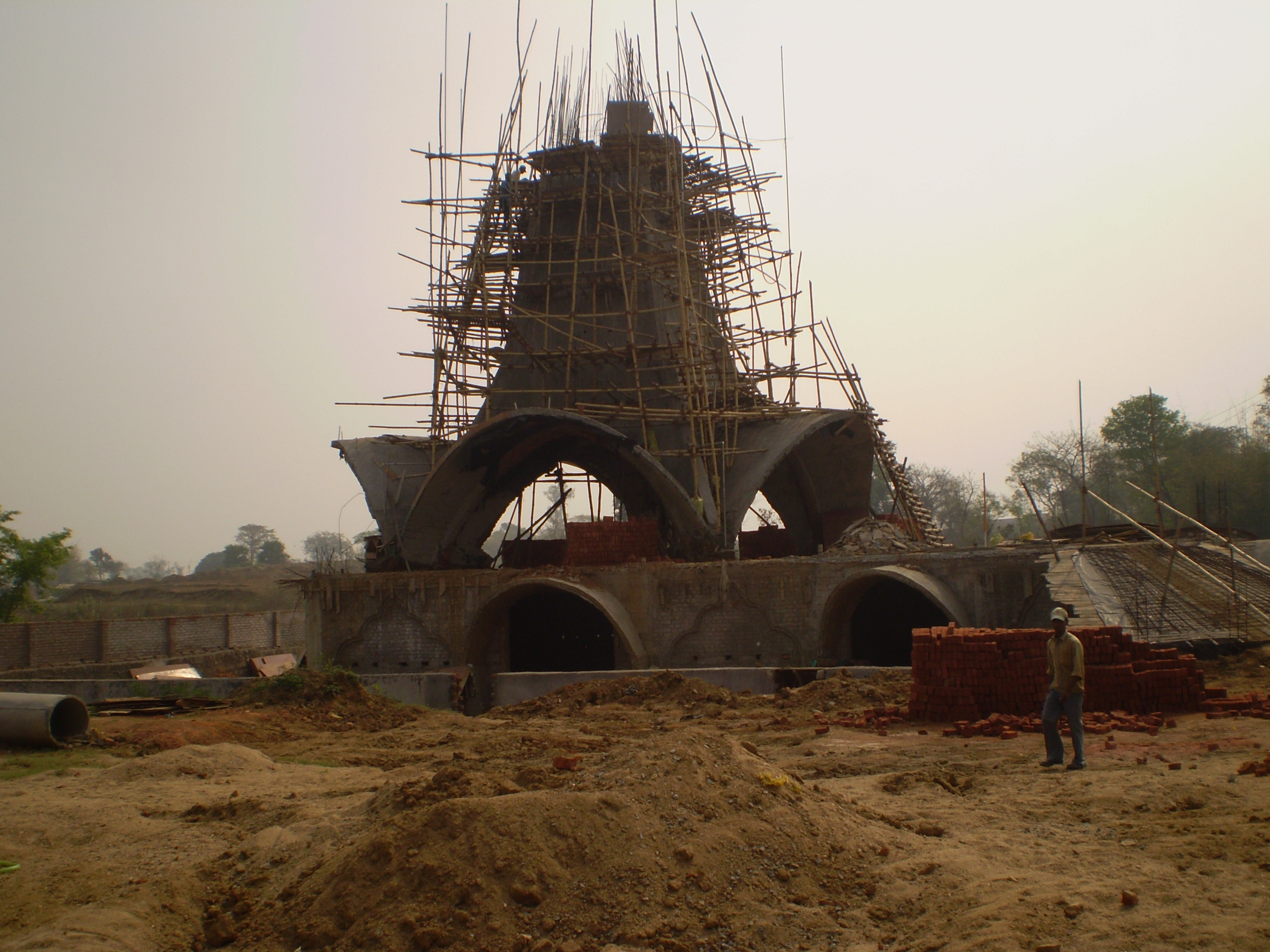
Kalika Temple as in March, 2012

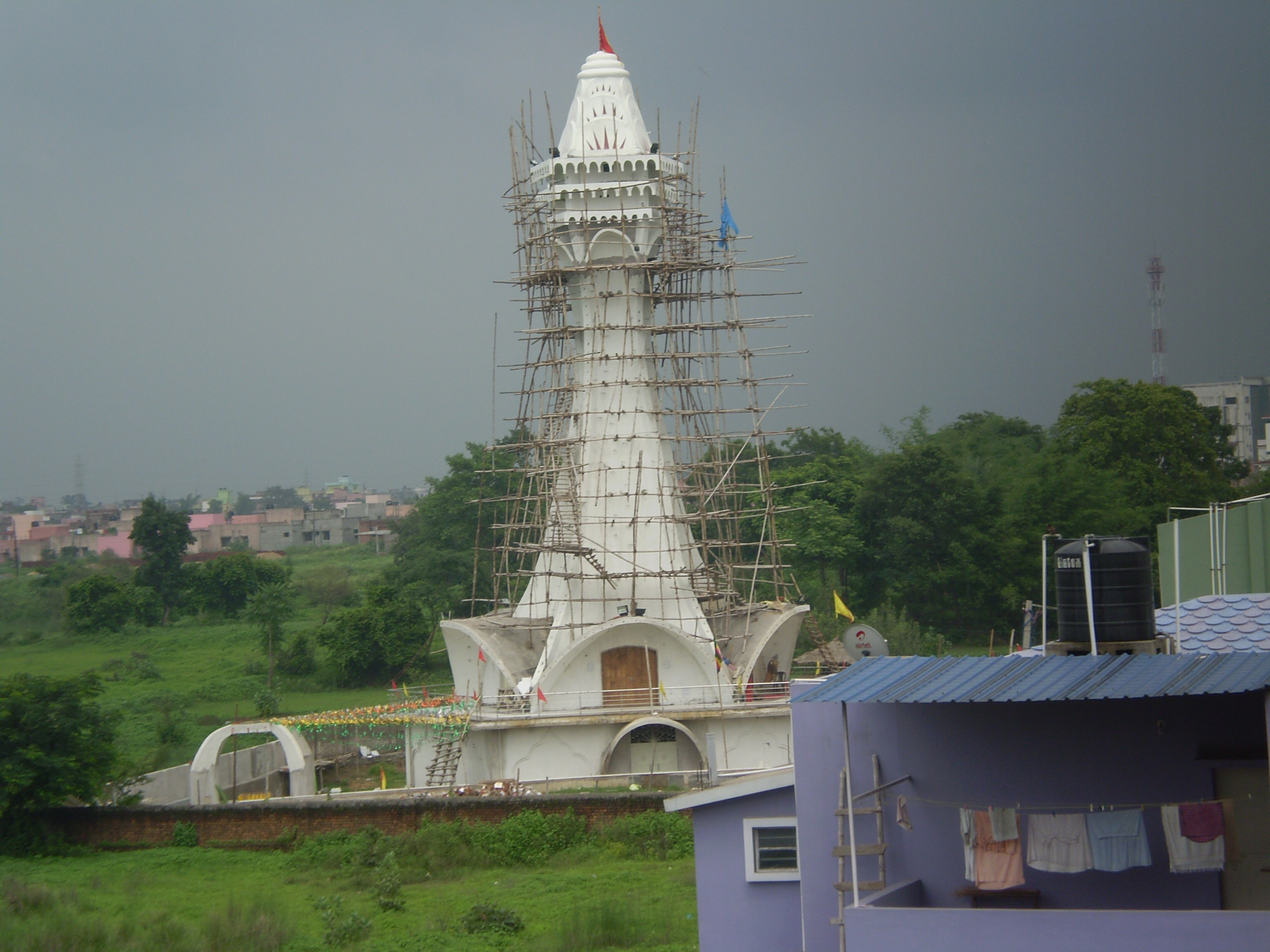
Kalika Temple as in August, 2012

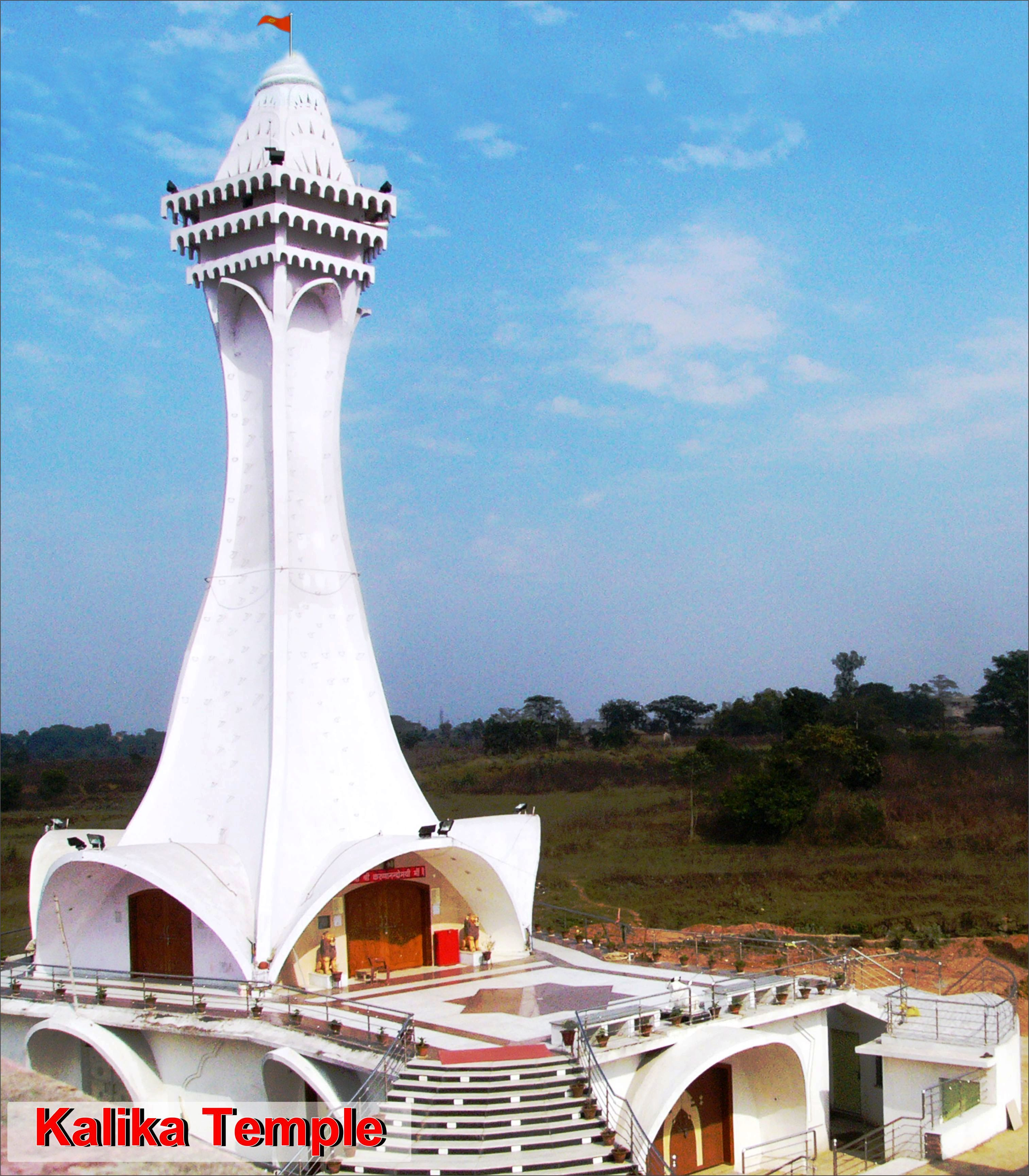
Completed Kalika Temple as in February, 2013

=== Temple ===
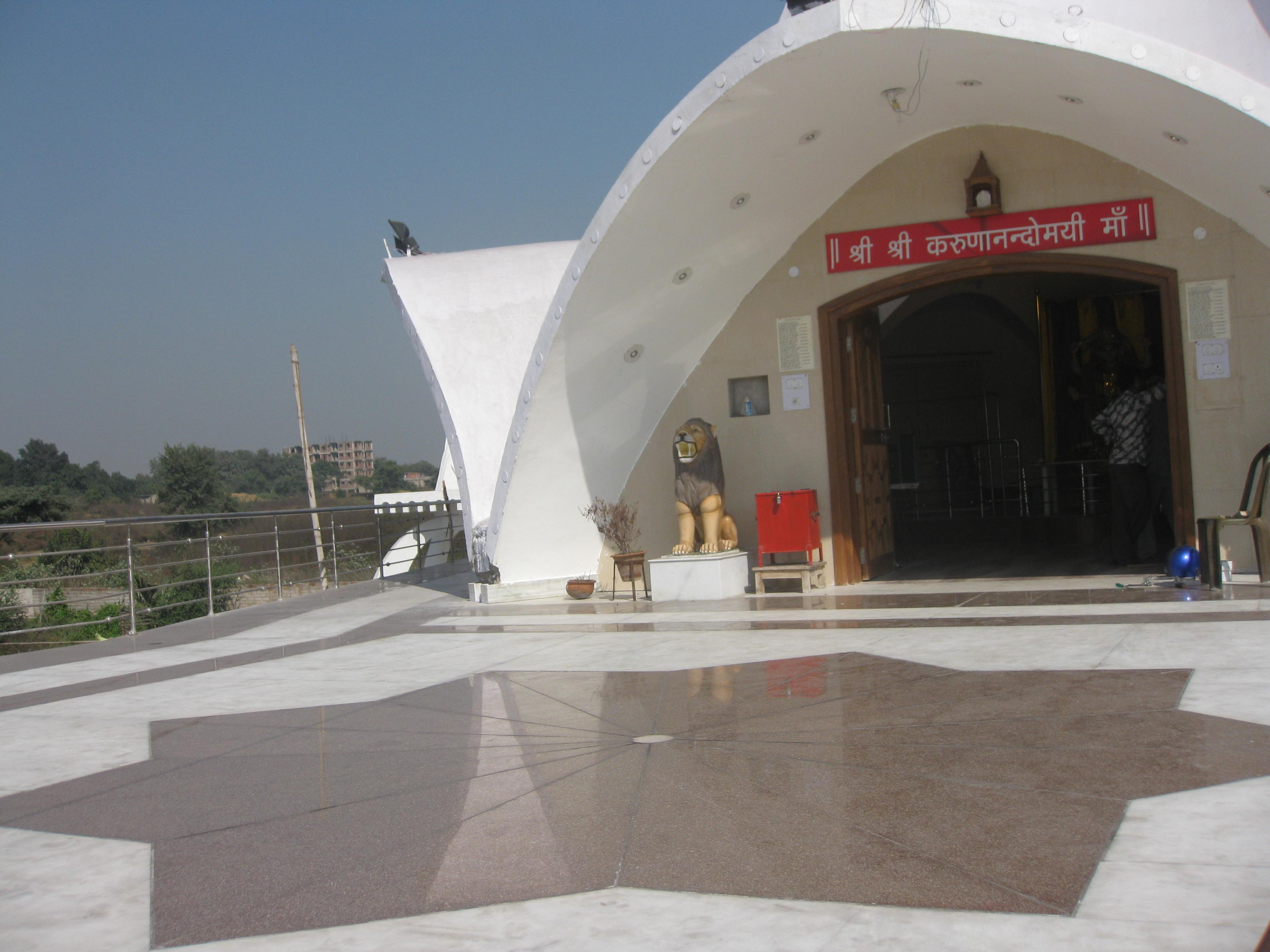
The view from the dias of Kalika Mandir at Chira Chas

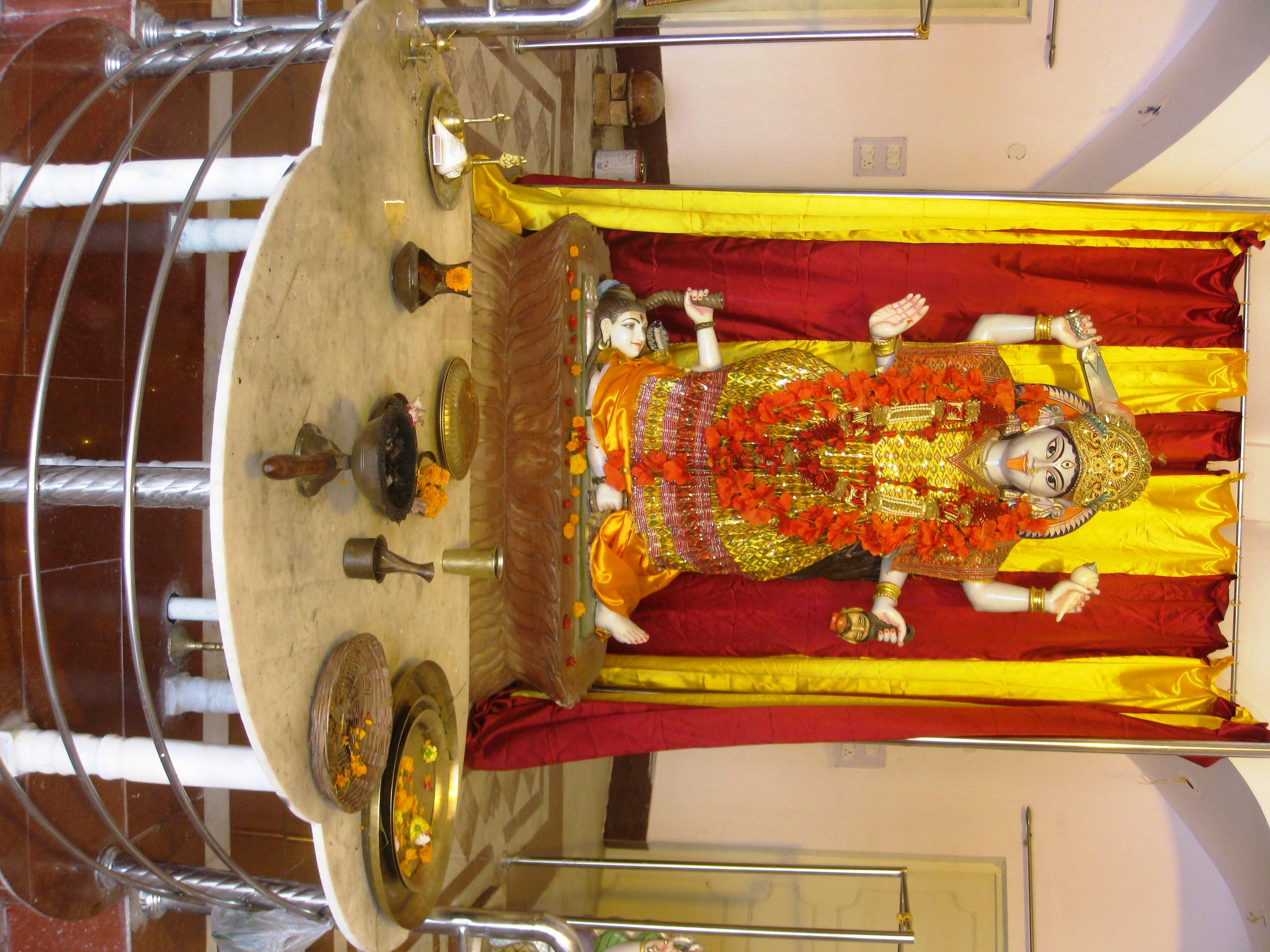
The offering table where 'aarti' is placed

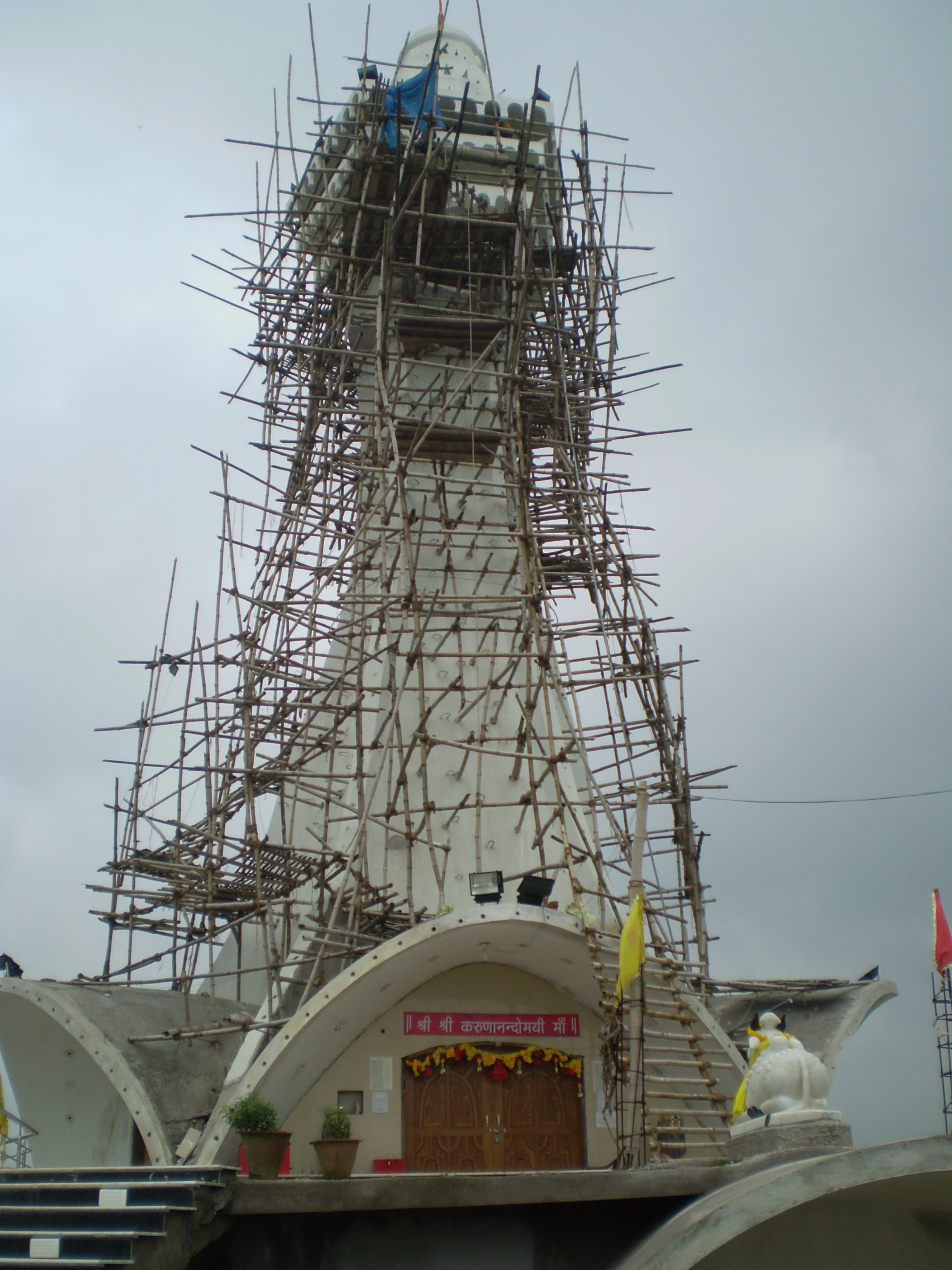
The towering spire of Kalika Temple

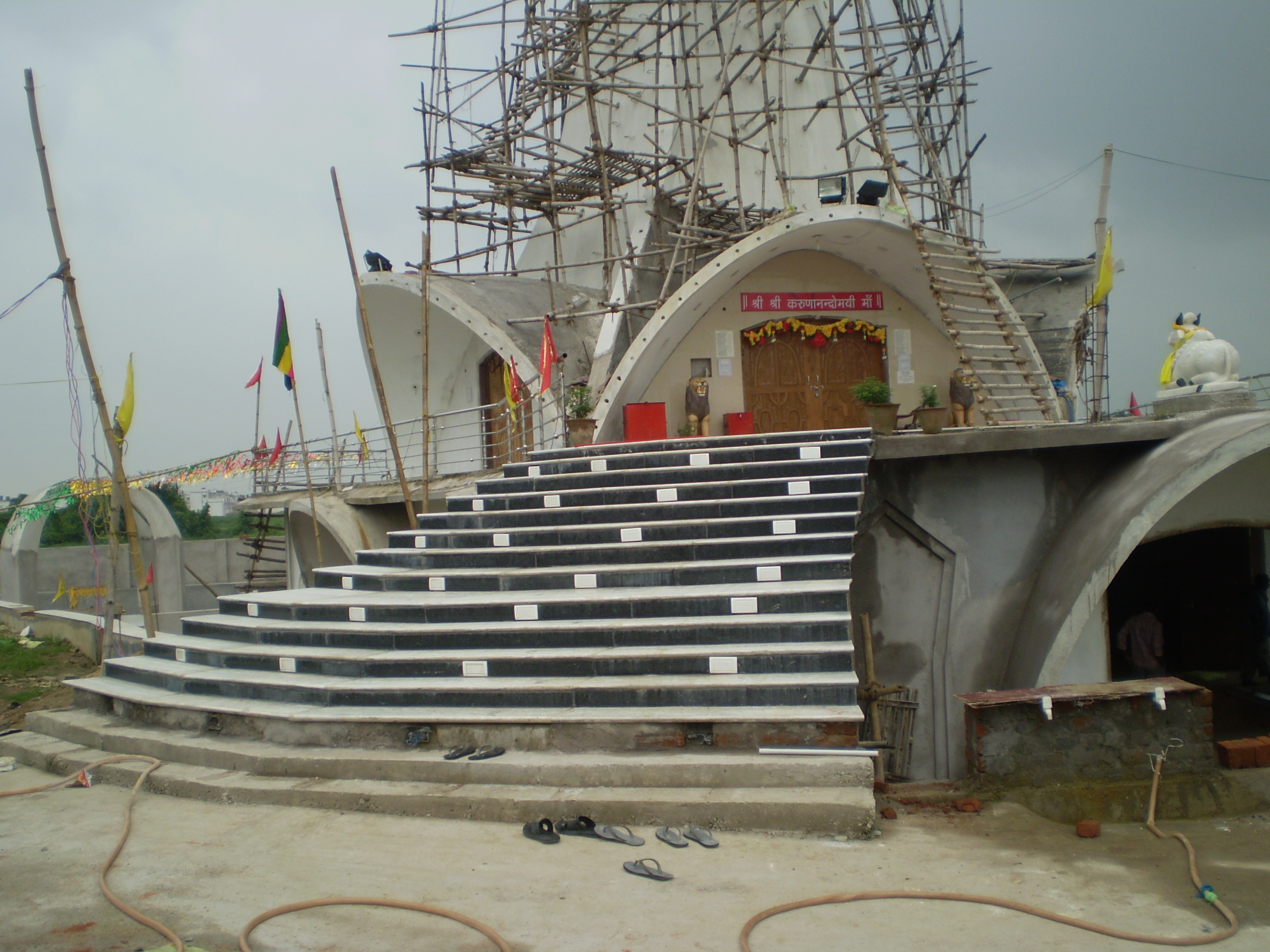
Entrance to Sri Sri Kalika Maharani Temple

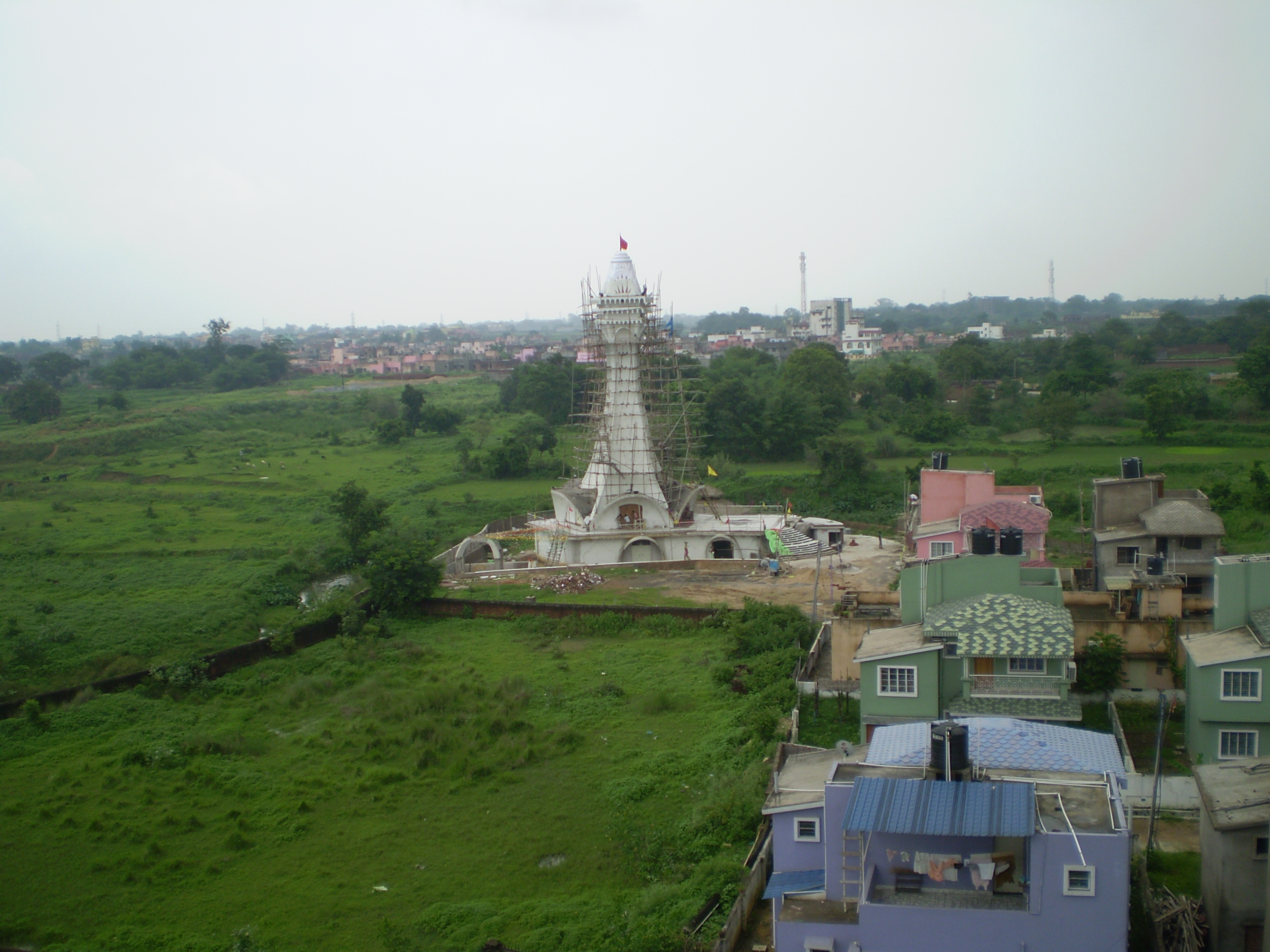
View of the temple from an elevated platform

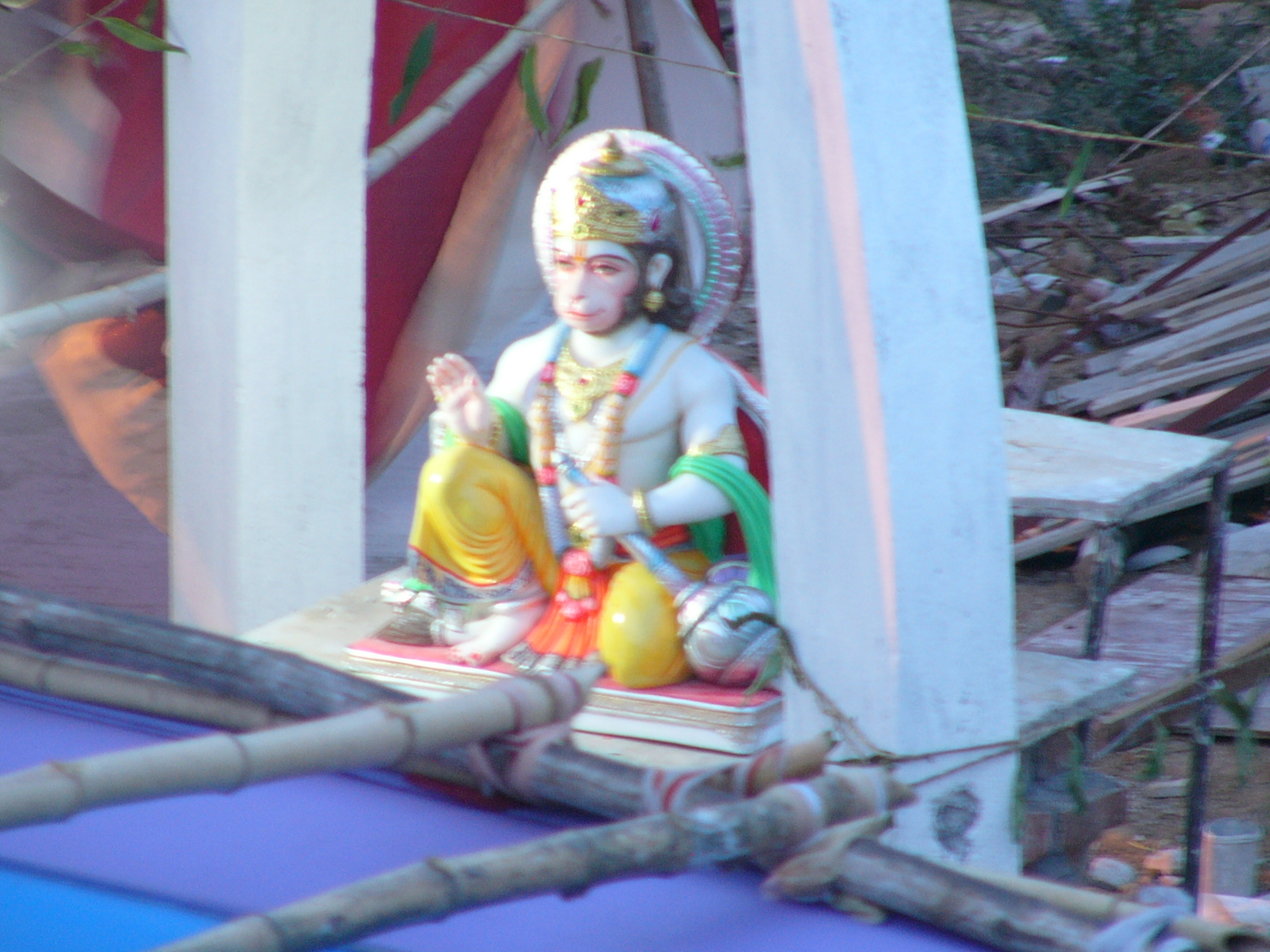
Hanuman temple at the entrance

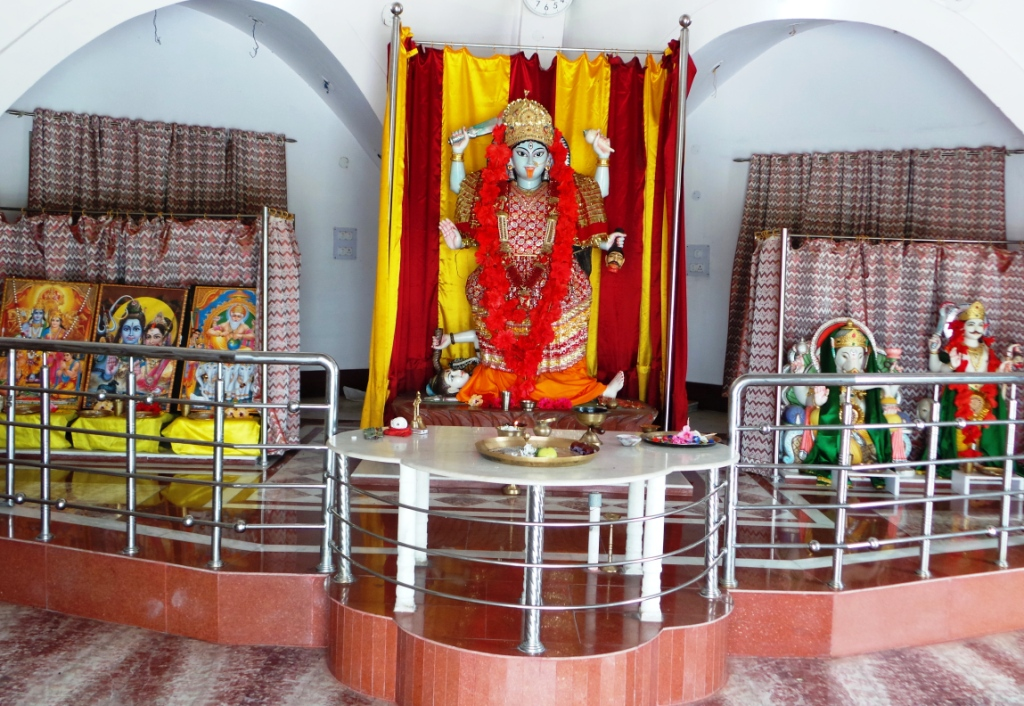
Ma Kalika at the temple with offerings

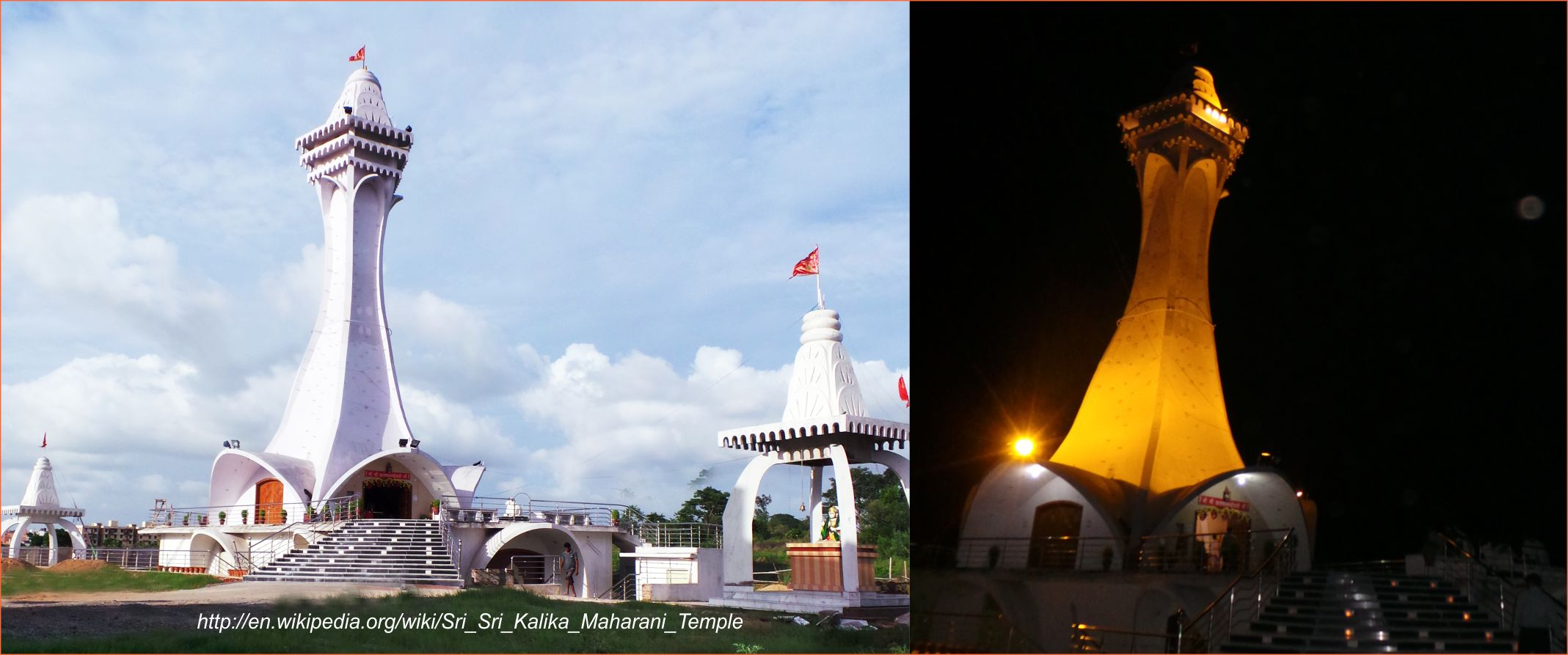
Kalika Temple at night and day

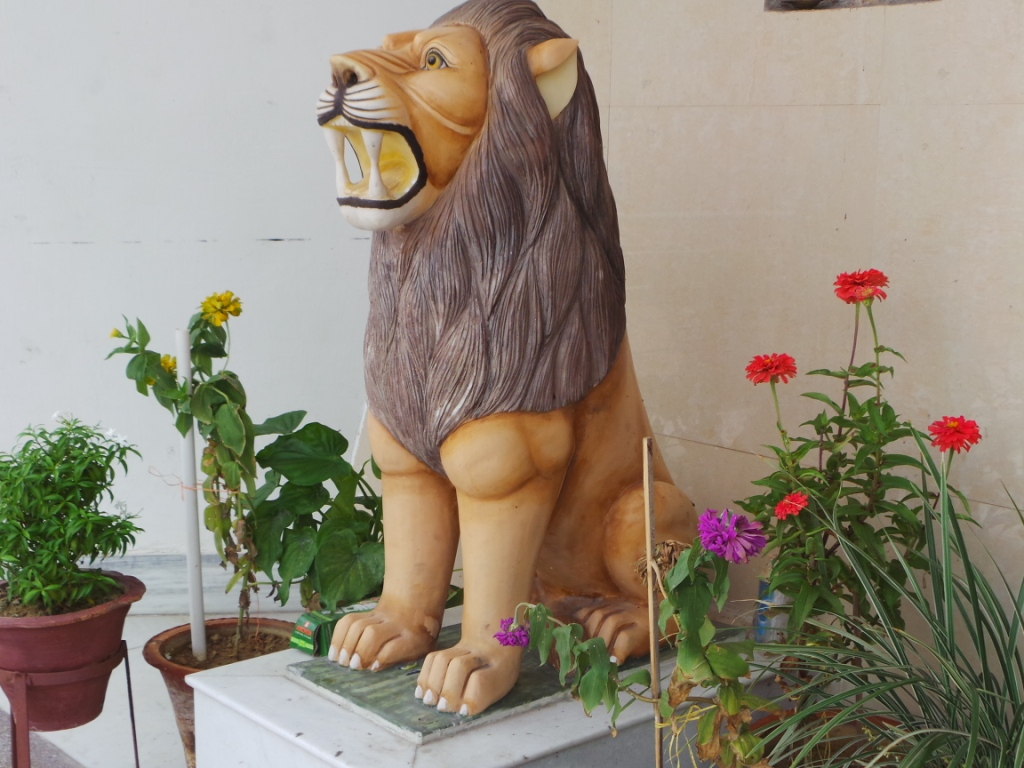
Lion Statue at the entrance

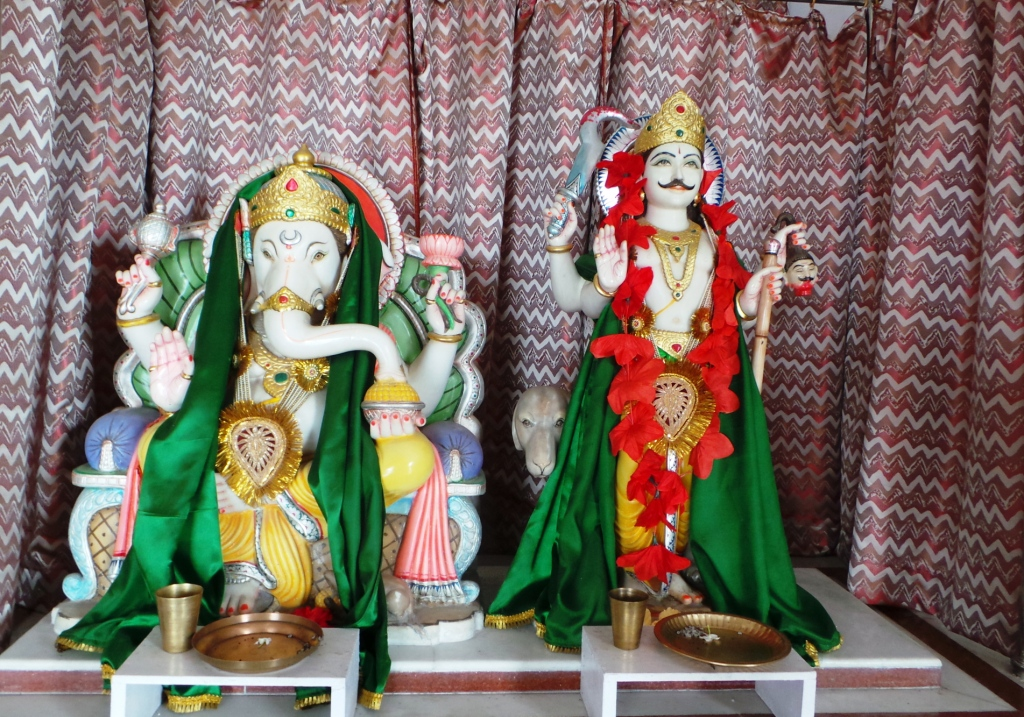
Ganesh and Kartikeya

== See also ==
- Rajrappa
