= Jojobera Power Plant =

Coordinates: 22.7557°N 86.2492°E

Jojobera Power Plant is a coal-based thermal power plant located at Jojobera, near Jamshedpur, East Singhbhum district in the Indian state of Jharkhand. The power plant is owned by Tata Power.

== Capacity ==
It has an installed capacity of 547.5 MW (1x67.5 MW, 4x120 MW).

The plant has been supplying power to Tata Steel.
