= Jojobera =

- Neighbourhood
- Location in Jharkhand, India Jojobera (India)
- Coordinates: 22.7601°N 86.2407°E
- Country: India
- State or Union Territory: Jharkhand
- Time zone: UTC+5:30 (IST)
- PIN: 831004
- Telephone/STD code: 0657
- Vehicle registration: JH 05
- Lok Sabha constituency: Jamshedpur
- Vidhan Sabha constituency: Potka
- Website: jamshedpur.nic.in

Jojobera is a town and neighbourhood of Jamshedpur, East Singhbhum district, Jharkhand, India. As a neighbourhood of Jamshedpur, it came under Telco Colony.

== Economy ==
Jojobera Power Plant is a coal-based thermal power plant located at Jojobera. The power plant is owned by Tata Power. It has an installed capacity of 547.5 MW (1x67.5 MW, 4x120 MW). The plant has been supplying power to Tata Steel.
