= BPSCL Power Plant =

Coal-based generating station in Jharkhand, India

- Country: India
- Location: Bokaro, Jharkhand, India
- Coordinates: 23.686°N 86.093°E

Thermal power station
- Primary fuel: Coal

Power generation
- Nameplate capacity: 338 MW

BPSCL Power Plant is a coal-based thermal power plant located in Bokaro district in the Indian state of Jharkhand. The power plant is owned by Bokaro Power Supply Company Limited, a joint venture between Steel Authority of India and Damodar Valley Corporation. It supplies power and process steam to Bokaro Steel Plant and surplus power to grid.

The plant's first unit was commissioned in 1982.

== Introduction ==
Bokaro Power Supply Company Limited (BPSCL) came into being on 18 September 2001 under Companies Act-1956 as a part of SAIL business reconstruction and restructuring plan and with intent to strengthen its core business activity. SAIL has assigned its entire business as a going concern pertaining to the captive power plant of 302 MW capacity having additional capacity of steam generation 660 TPH of BSL by the deed of transfer and assignment of business.

BPSCL became a joint venture of SAIL and DVC on acquisition of shares by DVC and entering a share holder agreement on 25 January 2002 among SAIL, DVC and BPSCL at Kolkata. SAIL and DVC agreed to participate in the equity share capital of BPSCL in 50:50 ratio. Now total capacity is 2180 TPH of steam and 338 MW of power.
