= FIITJEE =

Indian educational company

- Forum For Indian Institute of Technology-Joint Entrance Examination
- Formation: 1992; 34 years ago
- Founder: Dinesh Kumar Goel
- Type: Coaching institute
- Headquarters: FIITJEE House, 29-A, Kalu Sarai Rd, Vijay Mandal Enclave, Kalu Sarai, South Delhi, Delhi - 110016, India
- Region served: India, Bahrain, Qatar
- Services: Coaching institute for IIT-JEE and various engineering entrance examination
- Official language: English
- Key people: DK Goel (Founder)
- Staff: 3,200+
- Website: fiitjee.com

FIITJEE is an Indian coaching institute based in India designed to help students in competitive exams. It offers courses for students in grades 6-12 aspiring to appear in numerous competitive exams and other examinations.

== History ==
DK Goel, a mechanical engineering graduate from IIT Delhi, founded FIITJEE in 1992. FIITJEE offers coaching for students primarily aiming for admissions into IITs and NITs in India along with various science olympiads. FIITJEE Limited was incorporated on 13 October 1997 as a public company limited by shares.

== Controversies ==
=== 2009 AIEEE and IIT-JEE topper ===
A 2009 IIT-JEE topper, Nitin Jain, who had used the institution for his exams, said that he had been coerced into writing a letter of recommendation, which the organisation used in advertisements. The institute opened a website where they published responses under Jain's name. He and his father accused FIITJEE and another institution, Byju's, for "misusing" Jain's name "for commercial interest". Jain clarified that he had never attended Byju's. The Union Ministry for Human Resource Development referred the matter for an investigation by the Central Bureau of Investigation. FIITJEE denied the allegations.

Jain later wrote in his book The Secret of My Success that he was "subtly pressurised" and "cajoled into writing the letter, and most of it was not true." FIITJEE moved the Delhi High Court, claiming that parts of the book were "defamatory, offensive and fallacious", seeking a permanent injunction on the book's publication. The High Court dismissed the appeal, citing that the institute needed to prove that what the writer had published in his book was wrong. Jain and his father stated that Nitin had received a lower amount under the institute's Talent Reward Exam than the institute claimed, following several rounds of review at the institute's office.

=== Refund cases ===
FIITJEE has faced several cases in Consumer Courts for not returning fees paid by students when leaving the institute. In one such case in April 2017, the Hyderabad district consumer court directed FIITJEE to return 75% of the fees paid upfront and pay compensation of ₹1 lakh to parents. A Nagpur district forum ruled out that coaching classes taking advance fees was a discrepancy. They directed FIITJEE to refund ₹75,000 to a student who had enrolled in a 4-year program but left it after two years due to a lack of discipline and the absence of a biology teacher.

=== 2017: Paradise Papers ===
On 6 November 2017, the Paradise Papers revealed that 19,52,907 shares of FIITJEE valued at ₹36 crore were sold by QLearn company of Mauritius to Mumbai's Ambit Group in July 2015. QLearn is a subsidiary of Qatar's firm Qinvest, and the Ambit Group is one of its investors.

=== 2024: Centre Shutdowns and Refund cases ===
On July 12, 2024, two FIITJEE centres in Pune and Pimpri Chinchwad were abruptly shut down due to disputes. The parents of affected students filed police cases against the Institute at Chinchwad Police Station, accusing the Institute of scamming them of money.

=== 2024: Founder DK Goel abusing his employees ===
In December, FIITJEE founder and chairman, DK Goel, faced controversy after footage of a video showing him abusing his employees with misogynistic slurs during an official staff Zoom meeting regarding delayed staff salaries and a toxic work culture leaked.

=== 2025: Unpaid salaries and disputes with franchise partners ===
In January 2025, FIITJEE faced backlash as several centres across India, including Noida, Ghaziabad, Delhi, Ranchi and other cities, abruptly shut down. The closures, attributed to unpaid salaries and disputes with franchise partners, disrupted the studies of thousands of students. Multiple FIRs were filed against FIITJEE officials for fraud and breach of trust, with allegations of mismanagement and unfulfilled commitments.

=== 2025: Legal issues and investigation ===
In March 2025, the Economic Offences Wing (EOW) of Delhi Police registered a case against FIITJEE over allegations of cheating and financial irregularities. A special investigation team was formed to trace the alleged diversion of funds. Police said 258 complainants came forward, with the amount involved estimated at around ₹6 crore. Debits on 17 bank accounts were frozen, and look-out circulars were issued against four senior officials. On 27 April 2025, the company's Chief financial officer, Rajeev Babbar, was detained at Indira Gandhi International Airport in New Delhi and questioned by the EOW after arriving from Doha, Qatar. On 15 June 2025, the State committee of the All India Students' Federation (AISF) demanded criminal action against FIITJEE, alleging that the institute shut down coaching centres without prior notice after collecting course fees from students in advance.

=== 2025: Enforcement Directorate raids ===
In April 2025, the Enforcement Directorate (ED) conducted raids on the institute's and the founder's premises for alleged money laundering of student fee funds.
