= City Centre, Bokaro =

Central business market in Bokaro

City Centre
- Central business district
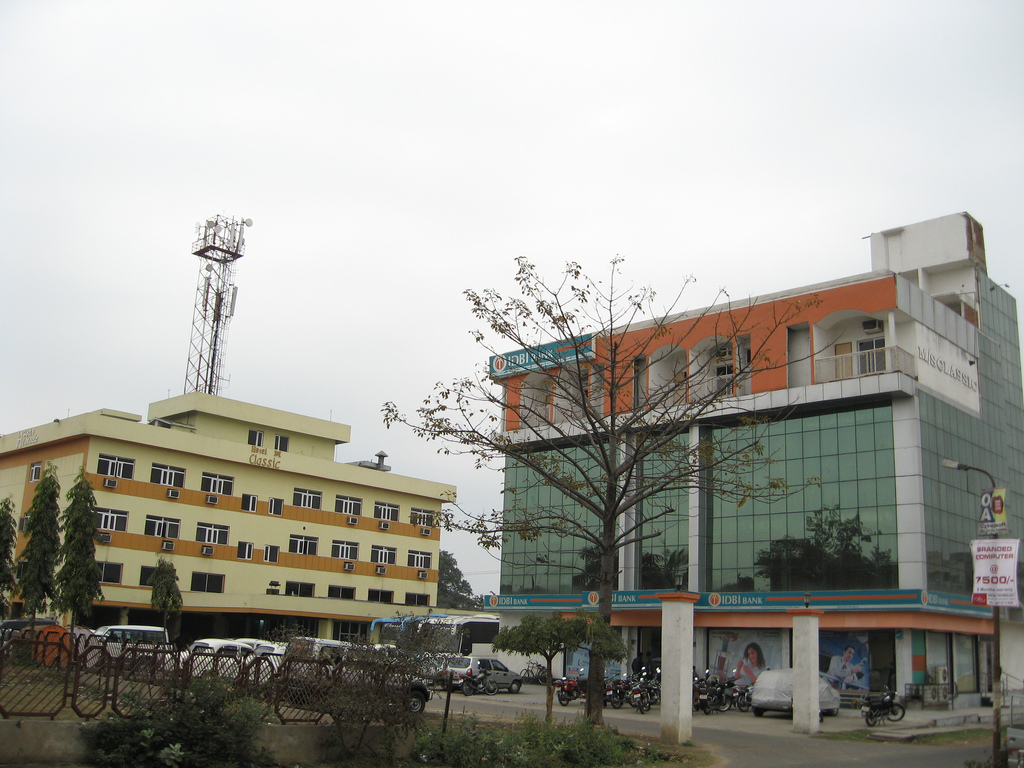
- Hotel Classic and IDBI Bank
- Interactive map of City Centre
- Coordinates: 23.67°N 86.15°E
- Country: India
- State: Jharkhand
- District: Bokaro
- Time zone: UTC+5:30 (IST)
- PIN: 827 0xx
- Telephone code: 91-06542
- Website: www.bokaro.nic.in

The city centre is the central business district of Sector 4, Bokaro Steel City, Jharkhand, India. It contains a market, a shopping complex, and many banks.

== Market ==
This is the main marketplace in Bokaro Steel City. It has over 1,500 permanent shops and about 2,500 temporary ones, drawing daily shoppers from Bokaro and surrounding areas. More than 200 women work in its shops, and traders are represented by the City Centre Traders Association.

The market has three public toilets, one run by Rotary Bokaro, a second built by Bokaro Steel Limited and run by a contractor, and a third built by Oil and Natural Gas Corporation under its corporate social responsibility program. As of September 2026, all three had issues, and female shoppers requested a separate "pink toilet."

In 2020, a fire broke out at night and destroyed more than eight shops and goods worth several lakh rupees.

== Traffic and parking ==
City Centre has an older and newer part, and has no designated parking lots. Vehicles park without proper organization, creating traffic jams around the market on a daily basis. In the evenings, even walking through the traffic gets hard.

In 2025, Bokaro Steel Limited's Town Administration completed mapping and tendering for two parking stands of 10,000 square metres each. One will be built in the old City Centre, and the other in the new.

== Education ==
City Centre had a FIITJEE centre, which has been closed since February 2025.

== Harshvardhan Plaza ==
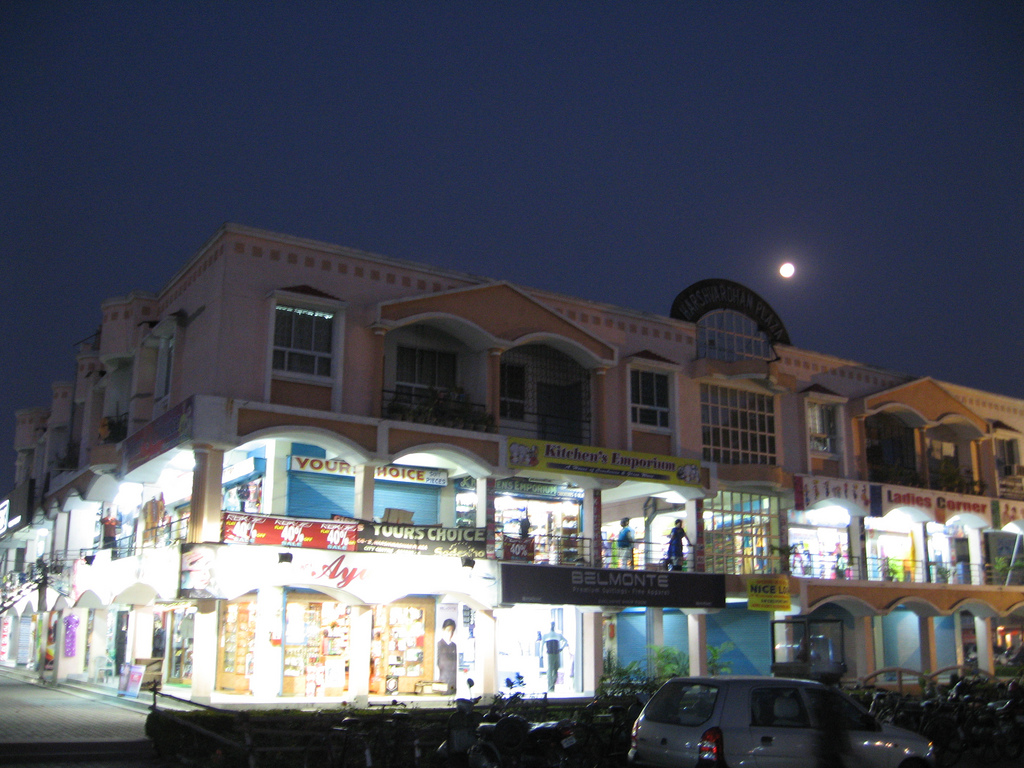
Harshvardhan Plaza

Harshvardhan Plaza is a shopping complex in City Centre.

An annual Ganesh Puja is held near Harshvardhan Plaza. In 2025, it was attended by Dhanbad MP Dulu Mahato and Bokaro Steel Limited's director-in-charge.

== Banks ==
Multiple banks have branches located at City Centre, Sector 4, including State Bank of India, Bank of Baroda, Bank of India, Canara Bank, HDFC Bank, IDBI Bank and Punjab National Bank.
