= Balidih Industrial Area =

Balidih Industrial Area BIA or Balidih Industrial Area
- Suburb
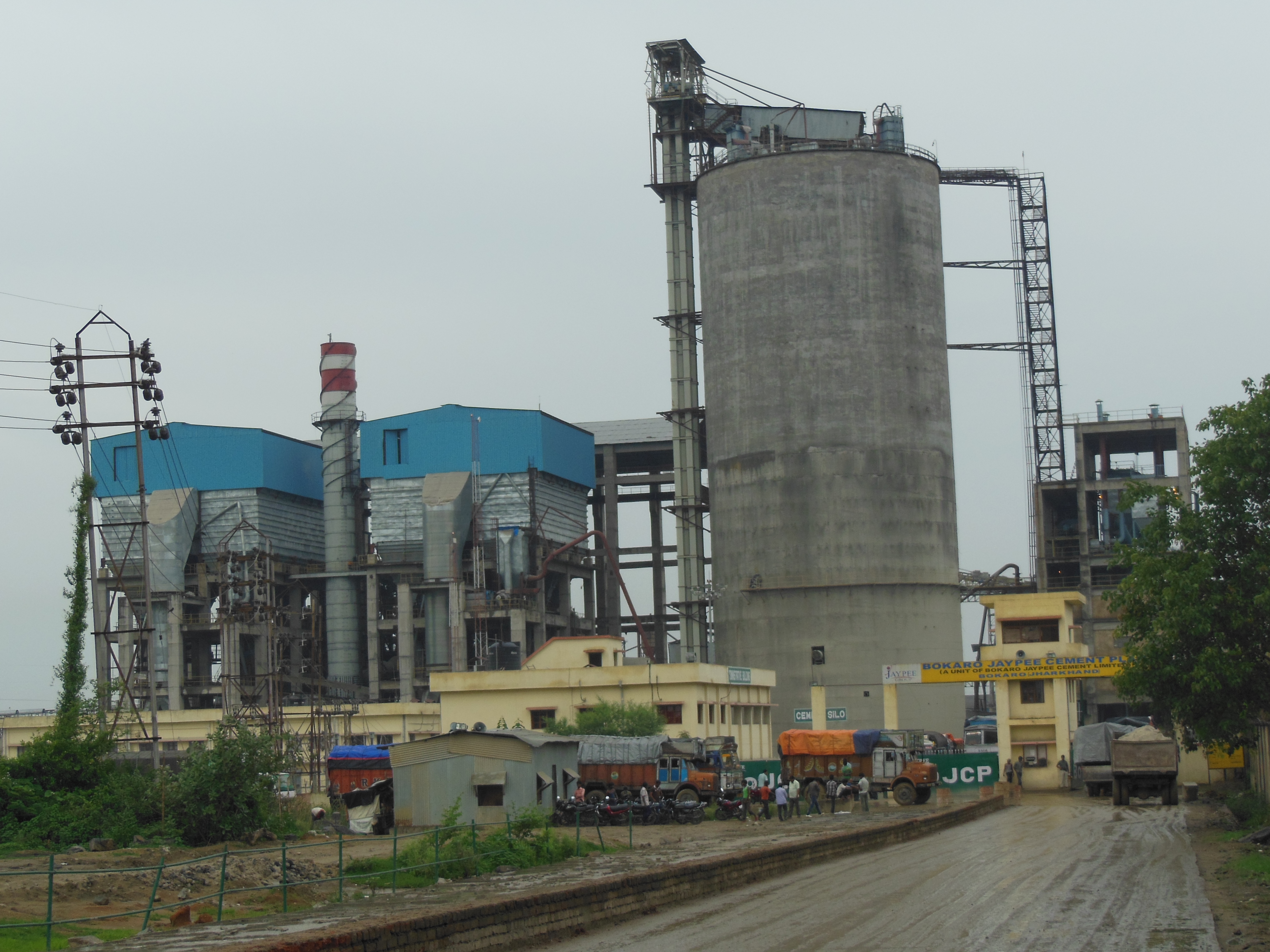
- Country: India
- State or Union territory: Jharkhand
- City/metro/Town: Bokaro

Balidih Industrial Area is an industrial hub in Bokaro Steel City, Jharkhand, India. There are a total of 300 industries in this area. It is planned to set up an IT Park here by Software Technology Parks of India. The area received a second position for external infrastructure, connectivity and environment safety in Industrial Park Rating System (IPRS) 2017–18 report.

== Controversy ==
Bokaro Industrial Area Development Authority found 27 entrepreneurs who were either not using the land or using it for purposes other than setting up the manufacturing units which was against the rules. The allocations of such 27 plots were eventually cancelled

== Companies ==
- Jaypee Cements
