= Astaneh =

Astaneh (Persian: آستانه or استانه) may refer to:

- Astaneh-ye Ashrafiyeh, Gilan province, Iran
- Astaneh-ye Ashrafiyeh County, Gilan province, Iran
- Astaneh, Ardestan, Isfahan province, Iran
- Astaneh, Anbarabad, Kerman province, Iran
- Astaneh, Jiroft, Kerman province, Iran
- Astaneh, Markazi, Markazi province, Iran
- Astaneh, Semnan, Semnan province, Iran
- Astaneh Rural District (disambiguation), multiple locations in Iran
