= Chas block =

Chas
- Community development block
- Location in Jharkhand, India Chas (India)
- Coordinates: 23°37′27″N 86°10′41″E
- Country: India
- State: Jharkhand
- District: Bokaro

Government
  - Type: Representative government

Area
  - Total: 573.95 km^{2} (221.60 sq mi)
- Elevation: 210 m (690 ft)

Population (2011)
  - Total: 671,762
  - Density: 1,170.4/km^{2} (3,031.4/sq mi)

Languages
  - Official: Hindi, Urdu

Literacy (2011)
  - Total literates: 447,457 (77.14%)
- Time zone: UTC+5:30 (IST)
- PIN: 827,001 (Bokaro Steel City)
- Telephone/STD code: 06542
- Vehicle registration: JH-09
- Lok Sabha constituency: Dhanbad
- Vidhan Sabha constituency: Bokaro
- Website: bokaro.nic.in

Chas is a community development block that forms an administrative division in the Chas subdivision of the Bokaro district, Jharkhand state, India.

== Overview ==
Bokaro district, a part of the Chota Nagpur Plateau, has undulating surface with the altitude varying between 200 and 282 m. Topographically, the entire area is divided into three parts – the Bokaro uplands in the west, the Bokaro-Chas uplands in the middle and Barakar basin in the east. The general slope of the region is from the west to the east. The main rivers are the Damodar, Garga, Parga, Konar and Gobei. The district, covered with hills and forests, is a mining-industrial area. With the construction of the gigantic Bokaro Steel Plant in the nineteen sixties, it has become the focal point of this district.

== Maoist activities ==
Jharkhand is one of the states affected by Maoist activities. As of 2012, Bokaro was one of the 14 highly affected districts in the state.As of 2016, Bokaro was identified as one of the 13 focus areas by the state police to check Maoist activities.

== Geography ==
Chas is located at 23°37′27″N 86°10′41″E.

Chas CD block is bounded by Chandrapura CD block and Baghmara CD block, in Dhanbad district, on the north, Chandankiyari CD block on the east, Purulia I and Joypur CD blocks, in Purulia district of West Bengal, on the south, and Jaridih CD block on the west.

Chas CD block has an area of 573.95 km^{2}. It has 54 gram panchayats, 128 villages and 2 census towns. Bokaro Steel City, Mahila, Sector IV, Sector VI, Sector XII, Chas, Chas (M), Pindrajora, |Harla and Balidih police stations are located in this CD block. Headquarters of this CD Block is at Chas.

== Demographics ==
=== Population ===
According to the 2011 Census of India, Chas CD block had a total population of 671,762, of which 249,083 were rural and 422,679 were urban. There were 352,726 (53%) males and 319,036 (47%) females. Population in the age range 0-6 years was 91,728. Scheduled Castes numbered 97,024 (14.44%) and Scheduled Tribes numbered 64,434 (9.59%).

Chas CD block has two census towns (2011 population figure in brackets): Bokaro Steel City (414,827) and Bandhgora (7,859). Bokaro Steel City Urban Agglomeration is composed of Bokaro Steel City (Census Town), Chas (Nagar Nigam) and Bandhgora (CT).

Large villages (with 4,000+ population) in Chas CD block are (2011 census figures in brackets): Pupunkighatbera (5,928), Narayanpur (7,167), Tentulia (7,085), Ghatiali (10,362), Chakalia (4,200), Kanrra (8,352), Kumri (4,885), Khamarbandi (5,682), Punrru (5,510) and Bhanrro (5,334).

=== Literacy ===
As of 2011 census the total number of literate persons in the Chas CD block was 447,457 (77.14% of the population over 6 years) out of which males numbered 264,210 (86.72% of the male population over 6 years) and females numbered 183,247 (66.55% of the female population over 6 years). The gender disparity (the difference between female and male literacy rates) was 20.17%.

As of 2011 census, literacy in Bokaro district was 73.48% , Literacy in Jharkhand was 66.41% in 2011. Literacy in India in 2011 was 74.04%.

See also – List of Jharkhand districts ranked by literacy rate

Literacy in CD Blocks of
Bokaro district
Bermo subdivision
Nawadih – 62.55%
Chandrapura – 75.41%
Bermo – 79.04%
Gomia – 65.40%
Petarwar – 62.33%
Kasmar – 65.33%
Jaridih – 68.94%
Chas subdivision
Chas – 77.14%
Chandankiyari – 63.65%
Source: 2011 Census: CD Block Wise
Primary Census Abstract Data

=== Language ===
Hindi is the official language in Jharkhand and Urdu has been declared as an additional official language. Jharkhand legislature had passed a bill according the status of a second official language to several languages in 2011 but the same was turned down by the Governor.

In the 2001 census, the three most populous mother tongues (spoken language/ medium of communication between a mother and her children) in Bokaro district were (with percentage of total population in brackets): Khortha (41.08%), Hindi (17.05%) and Santali (10.78%). In the 2011 census, scheduled tribes constituted 12.40% of the total population of the district. The five most populous mother tongues were (with percentage of ST population in brackets): Santali (70.12%), Munda (17.05%), Oraon (5.90%), Karmali (4.23%) and Mahli (3.23%).

== Economy ==
=== Livelihood ===
Livelihood
in Chas CD block
1. Cultivators (9.14%)
2. Agricultural labourers (9.23%)
3. Household industries (3.54%)
4. Other Workers (78.1%)

In Chas CD block in 2011, amongst the class of total workers, cultivators numbered 21,520 and formed 9.14%, agricultural labourers numbered 21,738 and formed 9.23%, household industry workers numbered 8,347 and formed 3.54% and other workers numbered 183,892 and formed 78.09%. Total workers numbered 235,497 and formed 28.95% of the total population, and non-workers numbered 577,905 and formed 71.05% of the population.

Note: In the census records a person is considered a cultivator, if the person is engaged in cultivation/ supervision of land owned. When a person who works on another person's land for wages in cash or kind or share, is regarded as an agricultural labourer. Household industry is defined as an industry conducted by one or more members of the family within the household or village, and one that does not qualify for registration as a factory under the Factories Act. Other workers are persons engaged in some economic activity other than cultivators, agricultural labourers and household workers. It includes factory, mining, plantation, transport and office workers, those engaged in business and commerce, teachers, entertainment artistes and so on.

=== Infrastructure ===
There are 126 inhabited villages in Chas CD Block. In 2011, 112 villages had power supply. 8 villages had tap water (treated/ untreated), 124 villages had well water (covered/ uncovered), 124 villages had hand pumps, and all villages had drinking water facility. 19 villages had post offices, 15 villages had sub post offices, 3 village had telephone (land line) and 54 villages had mobile phone coverage. 126 villages had pucca (hard top) village roads, 33 villages had bus service (public/ private), 36 villages had autos/ modified autos, and 89 villages had tractors. 12 villages had banks branches, 5 villages had agricultural credit societies, 1 village had cinema/ video hall, 4 villages had public libraries and public reading rooms. 69 villages had public distribution system, 10 villages had weekly haat (market) and 74 villages had assembly polling stations.

=== Agriculture ===
The average annual rainfall in Bokaro district is 1291.2 mm. The soil is generally laterite and sandy. 39.21% of the total area is under agriculture. It is generally a single monsoon-dependent crop. 9.90% of the cultivable land is under horticulture. Rice and maize are the main crops. Bajara, wheat, pulses and vegetables are also grown.

=== Backward Regions Grant Fund ===
Bokaro district is listed as a backward region and receives financial support from the Backward Regions Grant Fund. The fund created by the Government of India is designed to redress regional imbalances in development. As of 2012, 272 districts across the country were listed under this scheme. The list includes 21 districts of Jharkhand.

== Education ==
In 2011, amongst the 126 inhabited villages in Chas CD block, 7 villages had no primary school, 84 villages had one primary school and 35 villages had more than one primary school. 64 villages had at least one primary school and one middle school. 21 villages had at least one middle school and one secondary school. Chas CD block had 7 senior secondary schools and 1 degree college.

Chas College, Kanrra, Chakulia, was established in 1976. It is affiliated to Jharkhand Academic Council and Vinoba Bhave University, and offers intermediate and degree courses in arts, science and commerce.

Swami Sahajnanda College, Chas, was established in 1984 and secured university affiliation in 1993. It is affiliated to Vinoba Bhave University and offers courses in arts, science and commerce.

== Healthcare ==
In 2011, amongst the 126 inhabited villages in Chas CD block, 4 villages had primary health centres, 16 villages had primary health sub-centres, 2 villages had maternity and child welfare centres, 2 villages had allopathic hospitals, 2 villages had dispensaries, 26 villages had medicine shops and 60 villages had no medical facilities.
