= Astana (disambiguation) =

Astana is the name of a city in Kazakhstan and its capital since 1997.

Astana may also refer to:

== Sports ==
- Astana (cycling team), a professional road-cycling team
  - ONCE cycling team, briefly known as Astana at the tailend of the 2006 season
- BC Astana, a basketball club based in Astana, Kazakhstan
- FC Astana, a football club based in Astana, Kazakhstan
- HC Astana, a hockey club based in Astana, Kazakhstan

== Other uses ==
- Air Astana, an airline based in Kazakhstan
- The Astana (palace), a palace in Sarawak, Malaysia
- Astana (radio), a news and music station broadcasting from Astana, Kazakhstan
- Astana Cemetery, an archaeological site in Xinjiang, China
- Astana TV, a Kazakh television channel based in Astana, Kazakhstan

== See also ==
- Asthana (disambiguation)
- Astaneh (disambiguation)
- Istana (disambiguation)
