= Siwandih =

- Neighbourhood
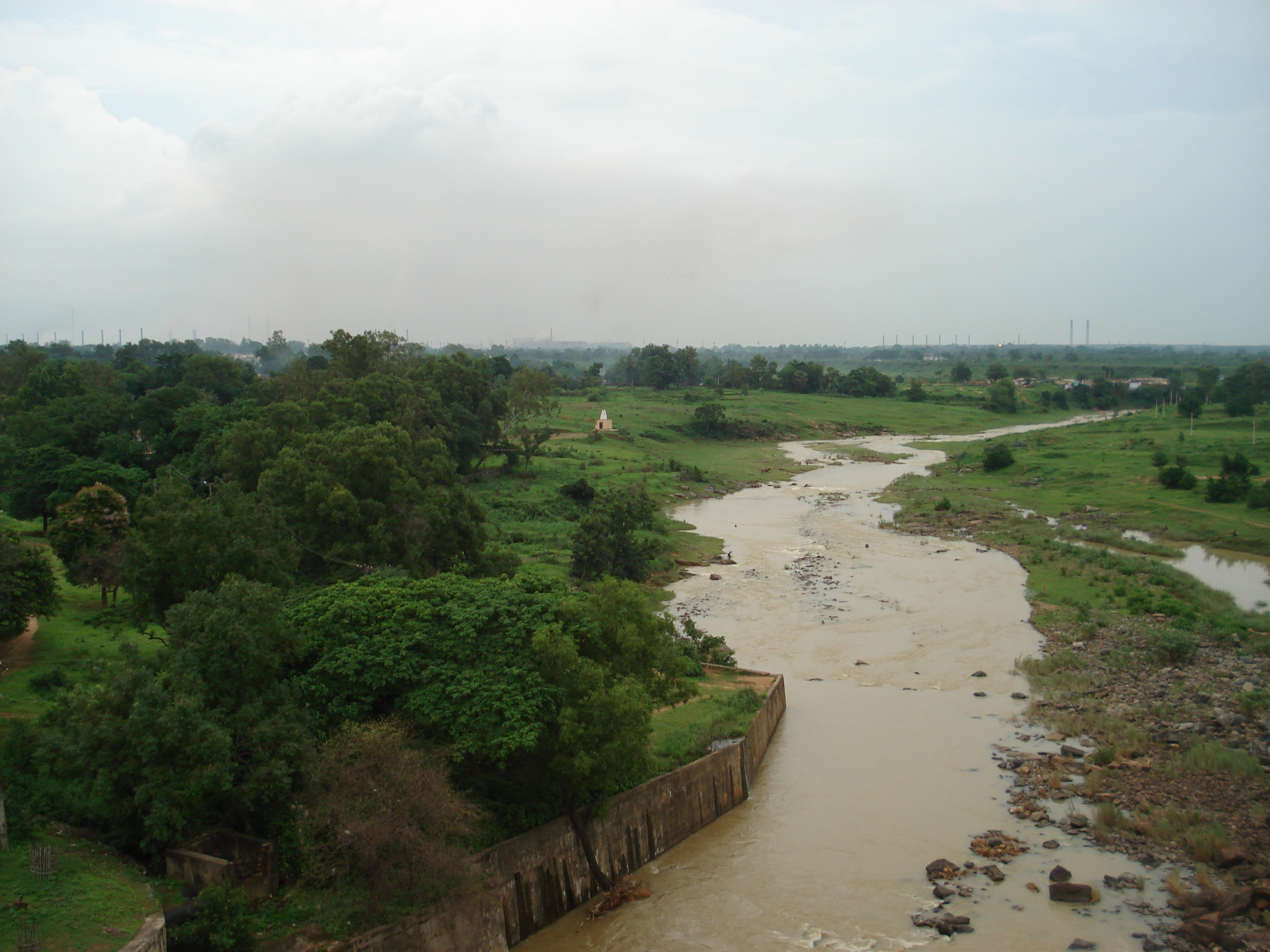
- Garga Dam River at Siwandih, Bokaro

- Country: India
- State or Union Territory: Jharkhand
- City: Bokaro Steel City

Siwandih is a suburb and a locality in Bokaro, Jharkhand, India.

== Education ==
- Bokaro Public School

== See also ==
- List of neighbourhoods of Bokaro
