= Asthana =

Asthana may refer to:

- Asthana (moth), a synonym of the moth genus Deinopa
- Asthana or Mandapa, a pillared hall or pavilion for public rituals in India
- Asthana Vidushi, an honorary title bestowed on a court musician or dancer in India
- Asthana (clan), a clan of the Kayastha community in India

== People ==
- Anushka Asthana (born 1980), British journalist
- Kunwar Bahadur Asthana (born 1915), Indian politician and judge
- Nupur Asthana, Indian film director
- Ragesh Asthana (1962–2014), Indian actor
- Rakesh Asthana (born 1961), Indian police officer and administrator
- Sanjay Asthana, doctor at the University of Wisconsin
- Shabnam Asthana, Indian public relations person

== See also ==
- Astana (disambiguation), the capital of Kazakhstan
