= Senapati Cricket Stadium =

Sports stadium in Bokaro Steel City, Jharkhand, India

- Bokaro Cricket Stadium
- Location: Bokaro Steel City
- Coordinates: 23°39′55″N 86°9′31″E
- Establishment: 1995
- As of February 2013; Source: The Times of India

Senapati Cricket Stadium or Bokaro Cricket Stadium or Bokaro Steel City Cricket Stadium is a sports stadium located in Bokaro Steel City, Jharkhand, India. The stadium has hosted some Ranji and state level cricket matches. As of January 2013 the stadium was ready to host national level matches.

== History ==
The stadium was constructed in 1995 and is currently maintained by Bokaro Steel Plant. Currently the stadium hosts district level, state level and Inter-Steel Cricket Tournament matches. As of January 2013 the stadium was ready to host national level matches. The stadium fulfils all basic requirements to organise national level cricket matches. P. N. Singh, general secretary of Bokaro District Cricket Association (BDCA) told in an interview– "We are making efforts to get national-level matches like Ranji Trophy here. Since the past two years, the Bis organizing board matches here. In 2011, the stadium hosted match between Jharkhand and Odisha, while 2012 witnessed game between Jharkhand and West Bengal"
