= Khairachatar =

- town
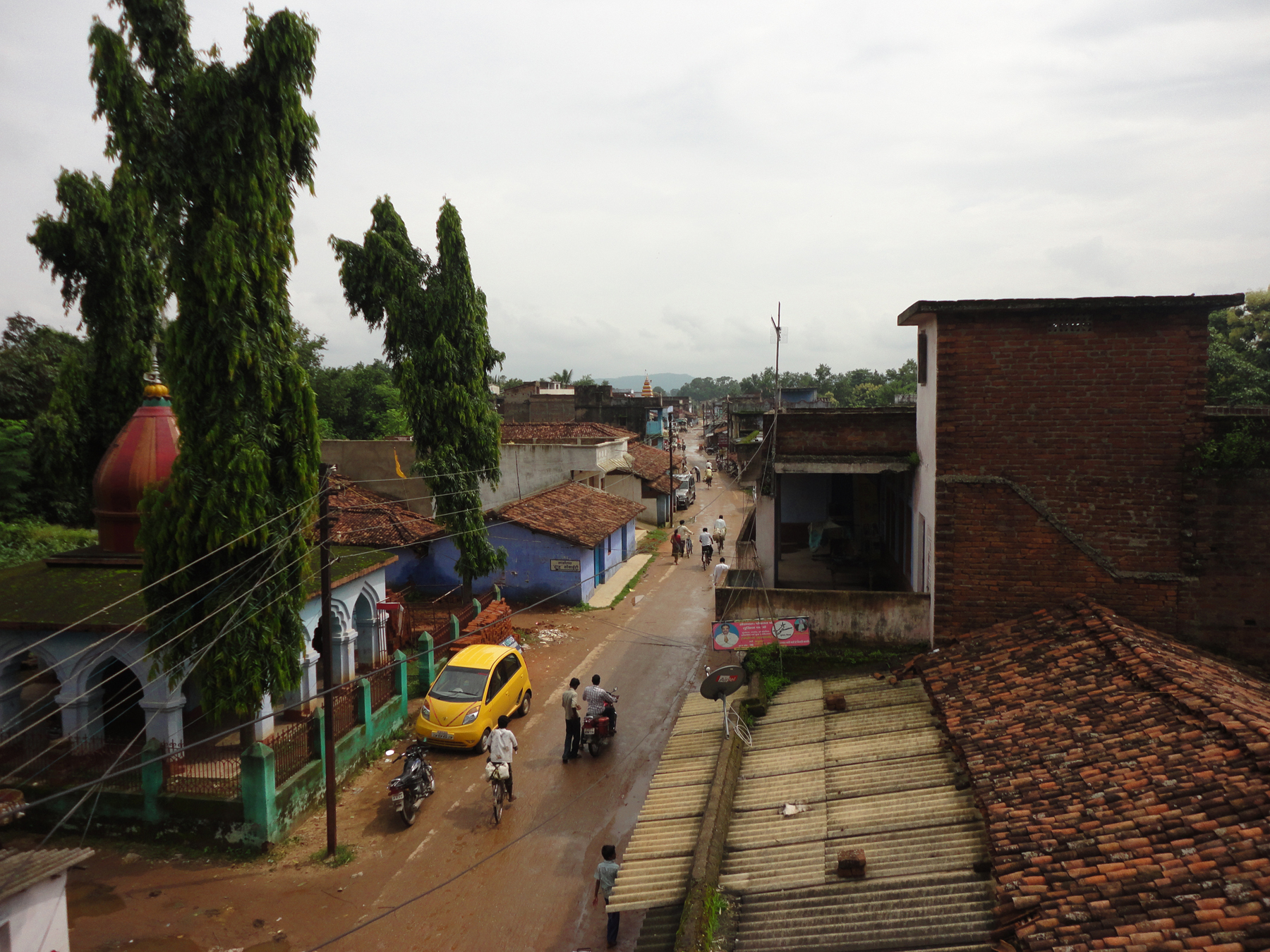

- Location within Jharkhand Location within India
- Coordinates: 23°32′21″N 85°55′58″E
- Country: India
- State: Jharkhand
- District: Bokaro
- Elevation: 400 m (1,300 ft)

Population (2011)
  - Total: 2,363
- Time zone: UTC+5:30 (IST)
- Vehicle registration: JH

Khairachatar is a small town and a gram panchayat in Bokaro district in the Indian state of Jharkhand. It is the most developed gram panchayat in Kasmar block of Bokaro District in terms of economy and literacy.

== Geography ==
Khairachatar is located in Kasmar Block of Bokaro District. It lies at the fringes of Chota Nagpur Plateau and has an average elevation of 400 metres above mean sea level.

== Economy ==
Approximately 50 villages are dependent on markets located in Khairachatar for basic needs. It witnesses a tremendous congregation of people from surrounding villages on Monday, Wednesdays and Saturdays who attend Bazaar in order to sell and purchase goods. Agriculture is by far the most important medium of earning in the surrounding villages, although a large part of the population of Khairachatar derives its income from small businesses. Another major source of income is money sent by a large number of immigrants working in distant cities. Khariachatar is witnessing small industrial growth as well. A few steel workshops, flour mills, and dairy farms have been set up.

== Transportation ==
Roads are the only medium one can use to reach Khairachatar. It is not connected to rail lines; the nearest rail station is the Bokaro/Pundag rail station. The closest commercial airport to Khairachatar is in Ranchi. Many buses, mini buses, and cars travel daily to all major nearby places.

== Education ==
Educational institutions in Khairachatar include:

- Singhpur Inter college
- Middle School, Khairachatar
- Ranvijay Roshan Public School : A Co-educational English medium Public School
- Saraswati Shishu Vidya Mandir
- Anand Marg School
- KN (+2)High School Harnad

== Demographics ==
In 2011, the India census determined that Khairachatar had a population of 2363 of which 1239 are males while 1124 are females. The population of children with age 0-6 is 296, which makes up 12.53% of the total population of the village. The average Sex Ratio of Khaira Chatar village is 907 which is lower than the Jharkhand state average of 948. The Child Sex Ratio for the Khairachatar as per census is 783, lower than the Jharkhand average of 948. The village has a higher literacy rate compared to Jharkhand. In 2011, the literacy rate of Khairachatar was 79.00% compared to 66.41% of Jharkhand. In Khairachatar Male literacy stands at 89.00% while female literacy rate was 68.21%. Khairachatar has a government facilitated hospital. Khairachatar boasts its high educational standards in the science, art, and commerce streams of education. Khairachatar has been a major beneficiary of The Mahatma Gandhi National Rural Employment Guarantee Act although a large part of the population is still dependent on agriculture. It is home to a harmonious blend of people of different castes and religion. It is known for its many festival celebrations throughout the year. Durga Puja is particularly popular.

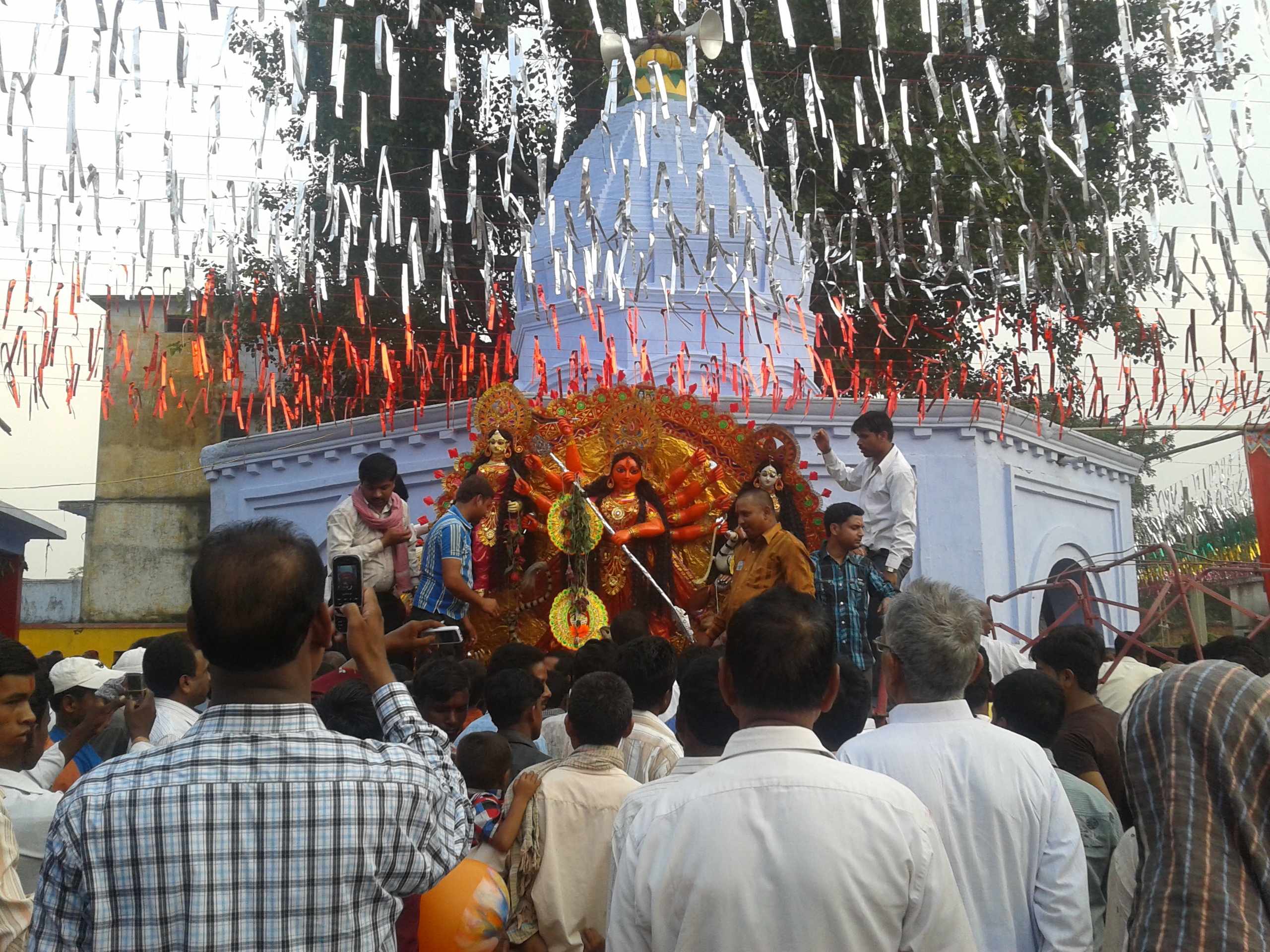
Durga Puja Celebration

== Gallery ==
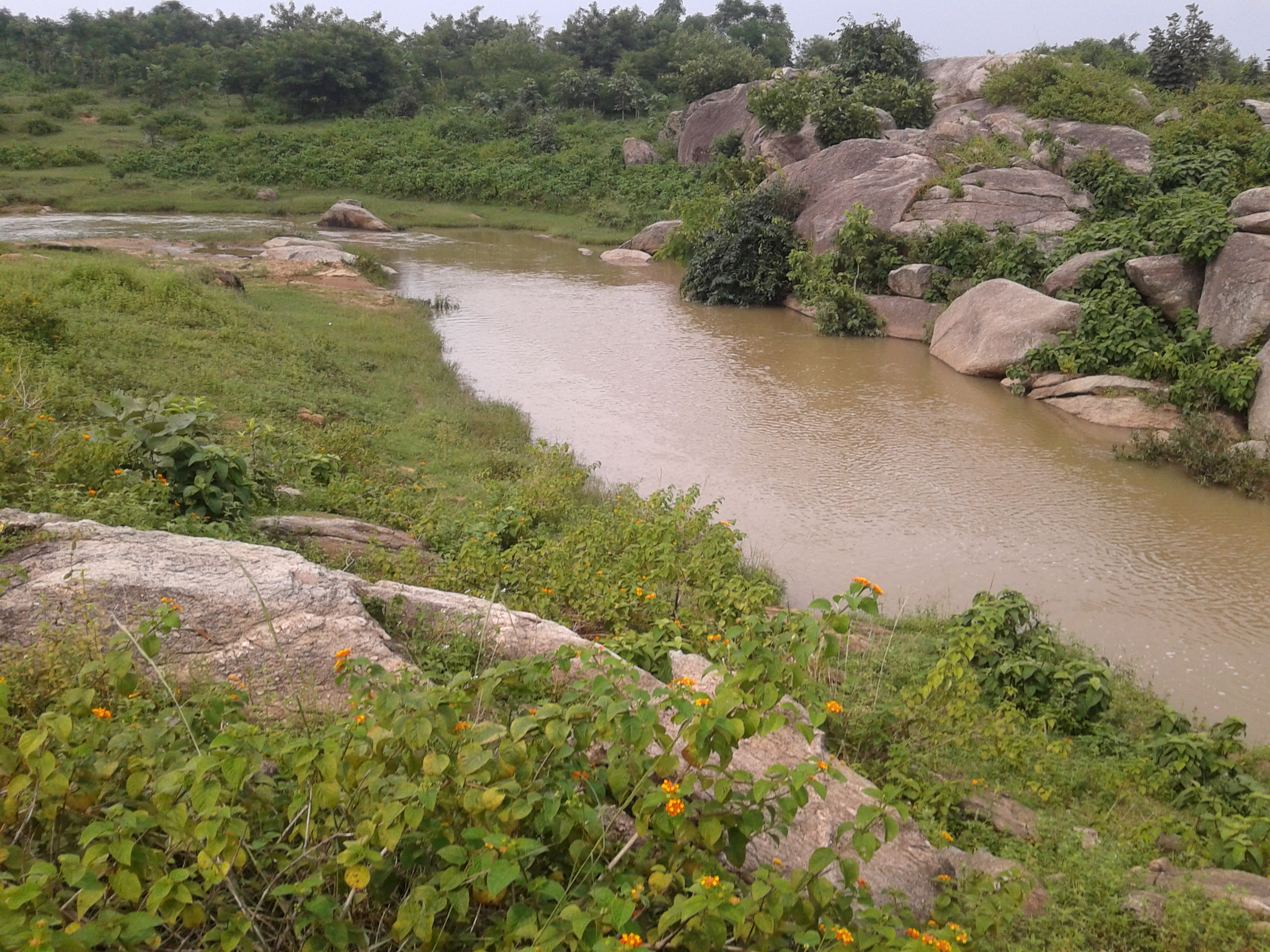
Viddaha River

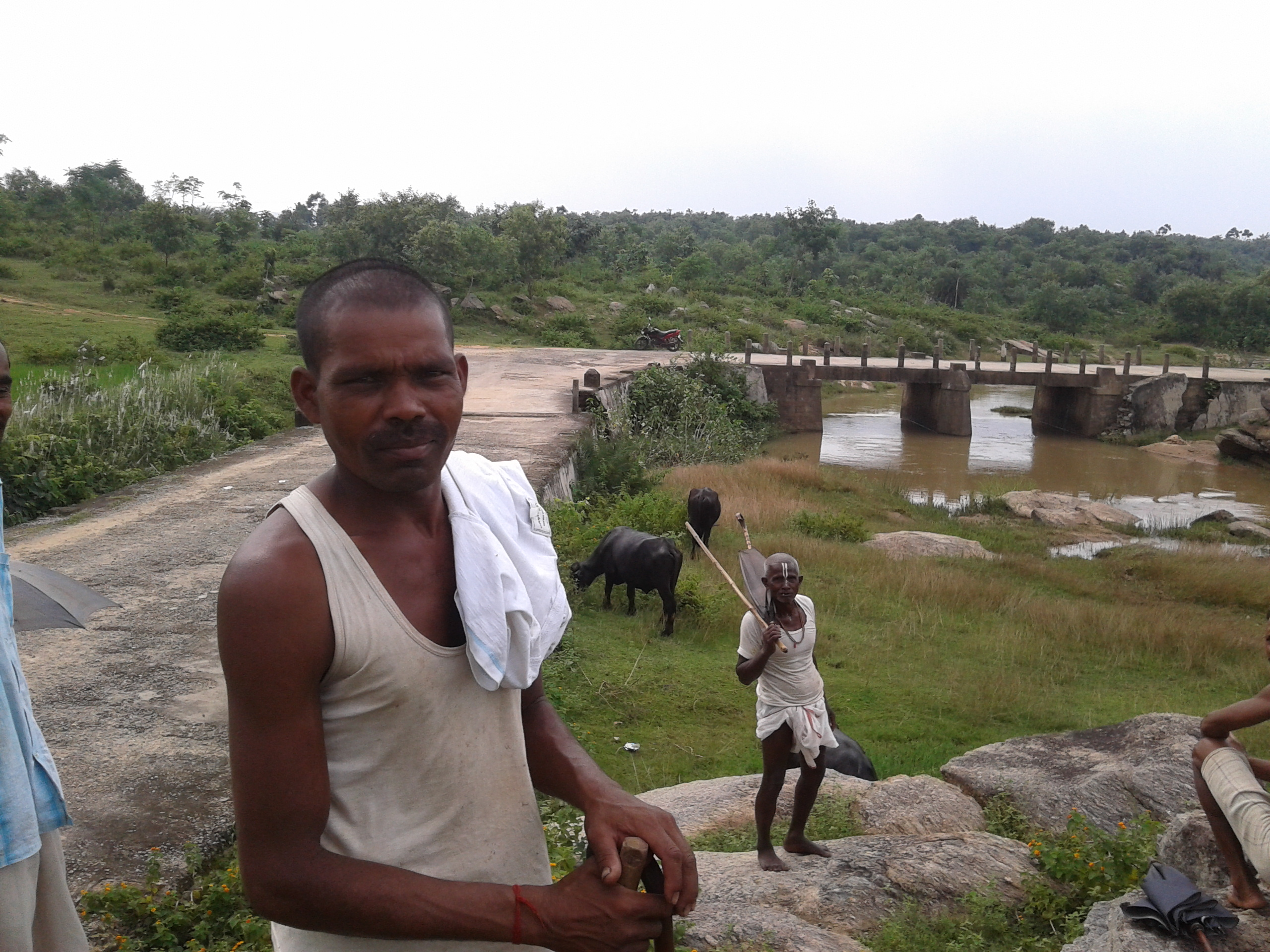
Shepherds at the bank of the river Viddaha

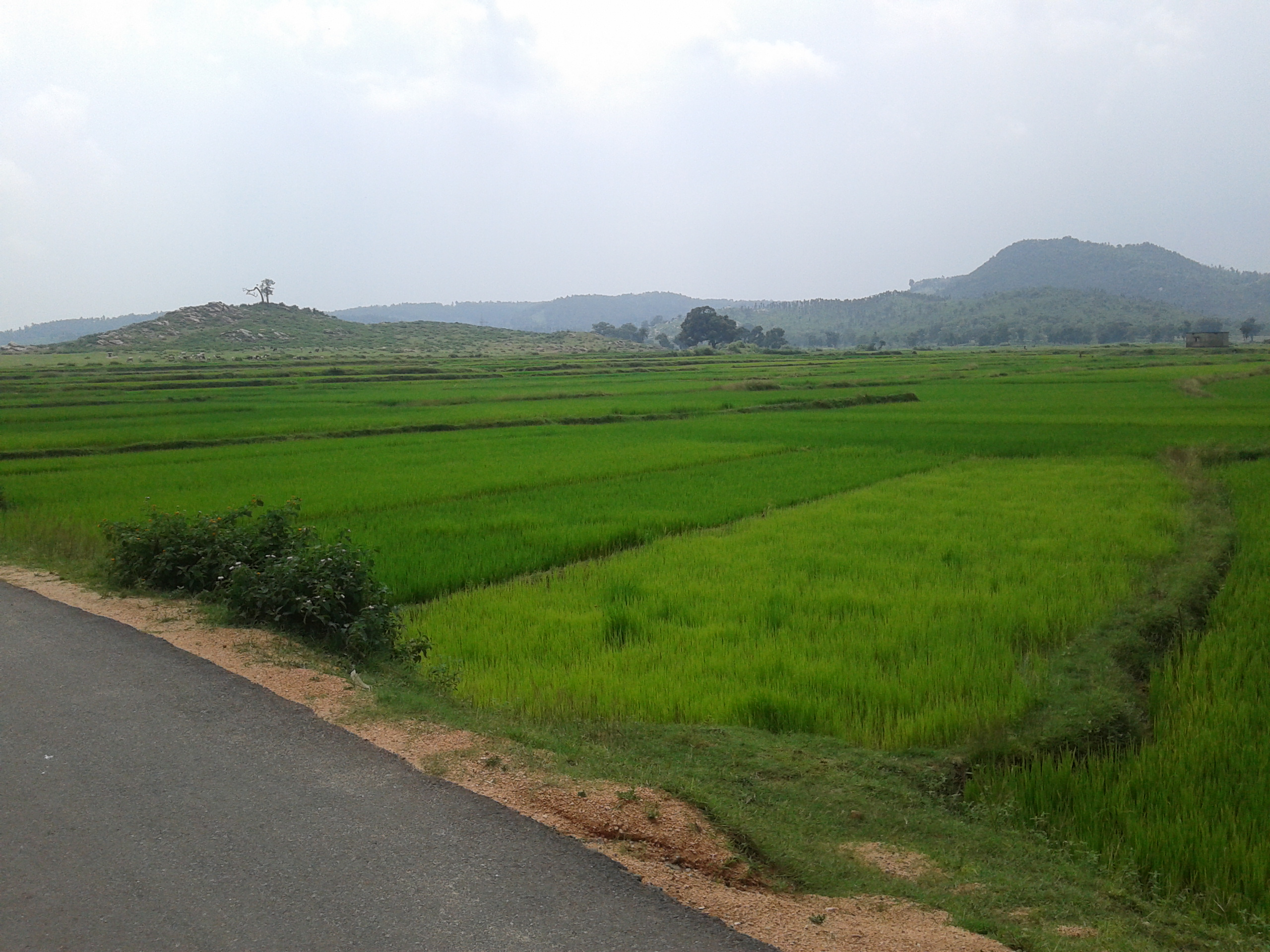
Gateway to Sewati Hills

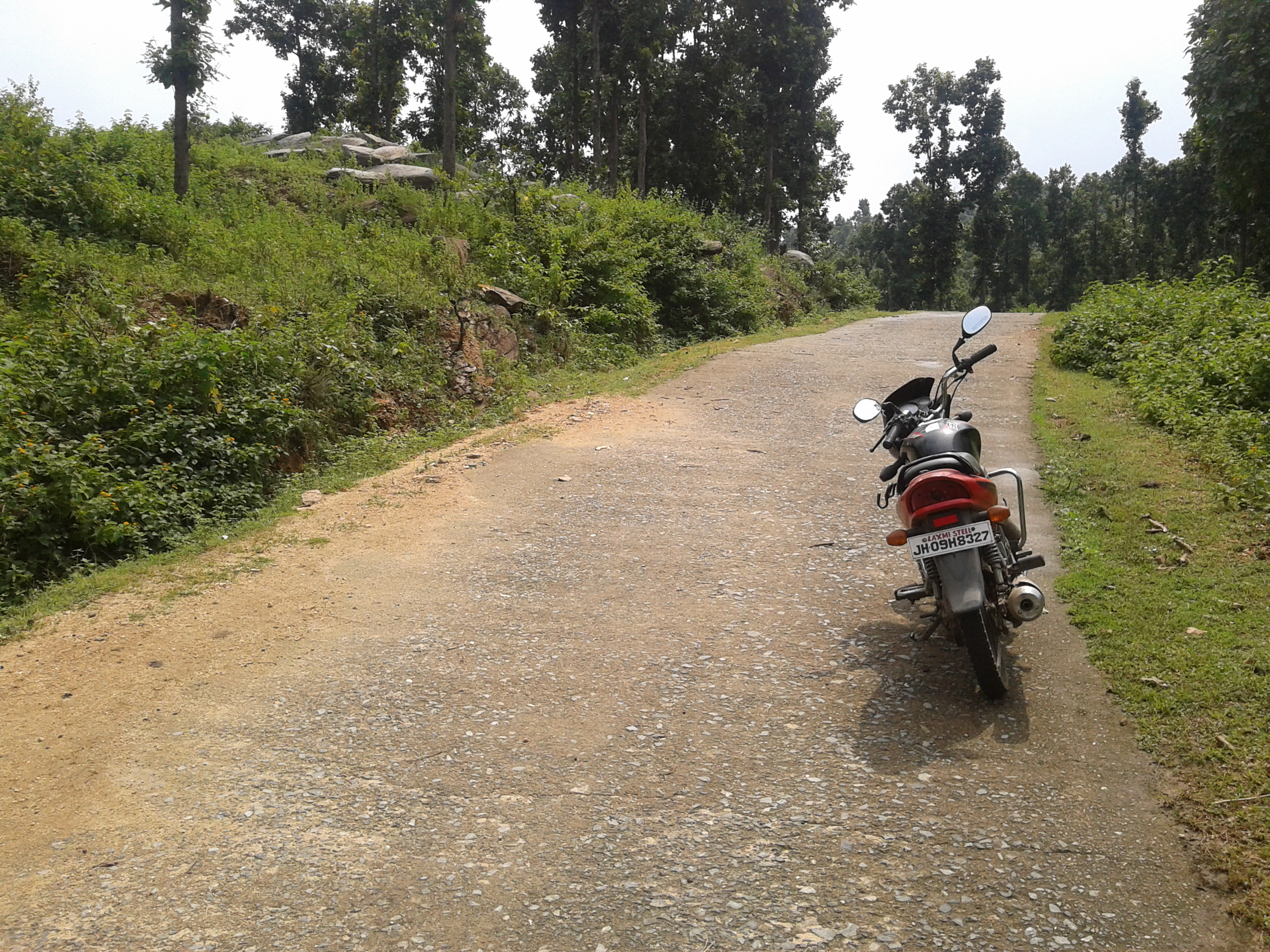
Heesim Hills

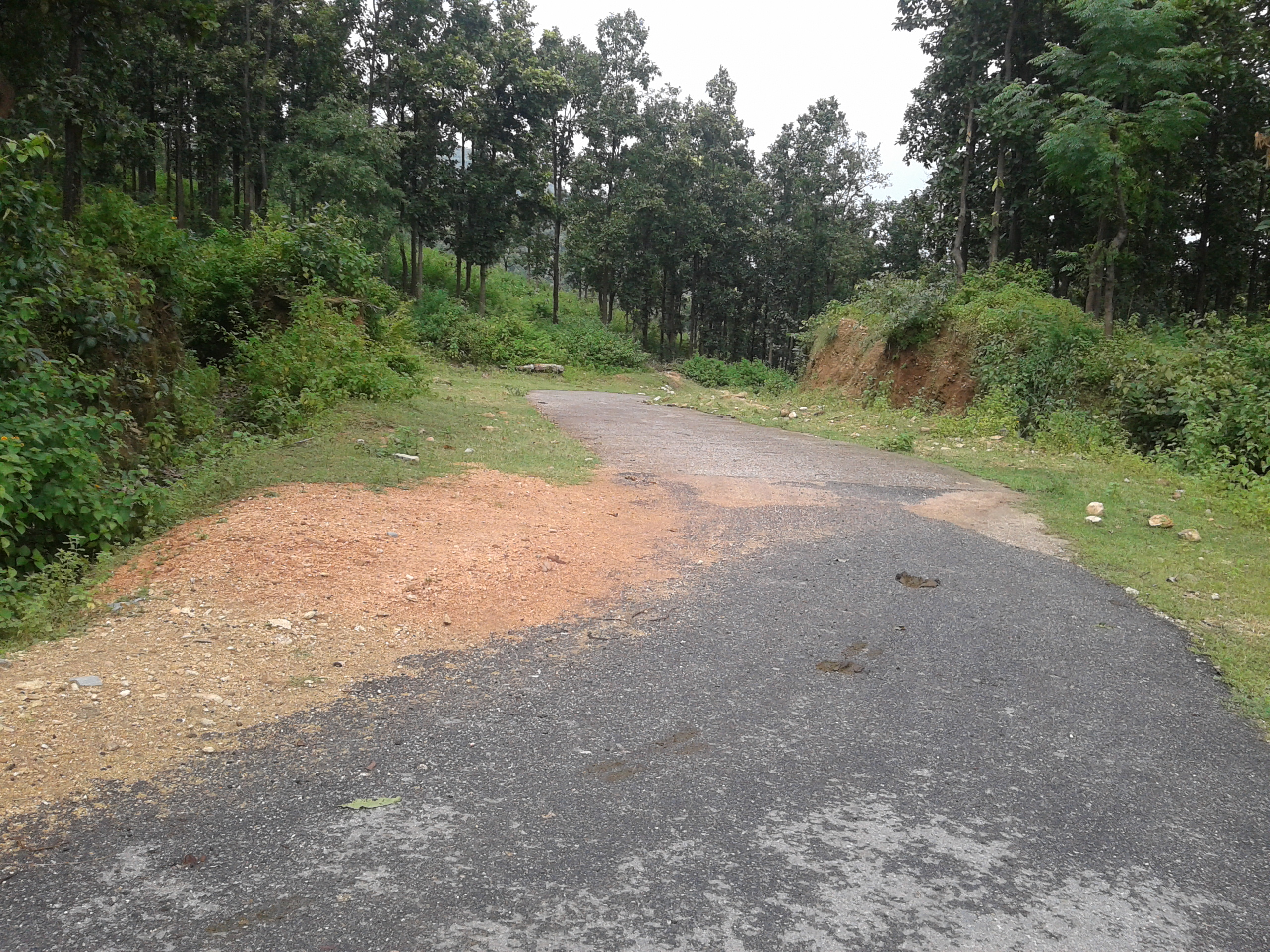
Picturesque Heesim Hills

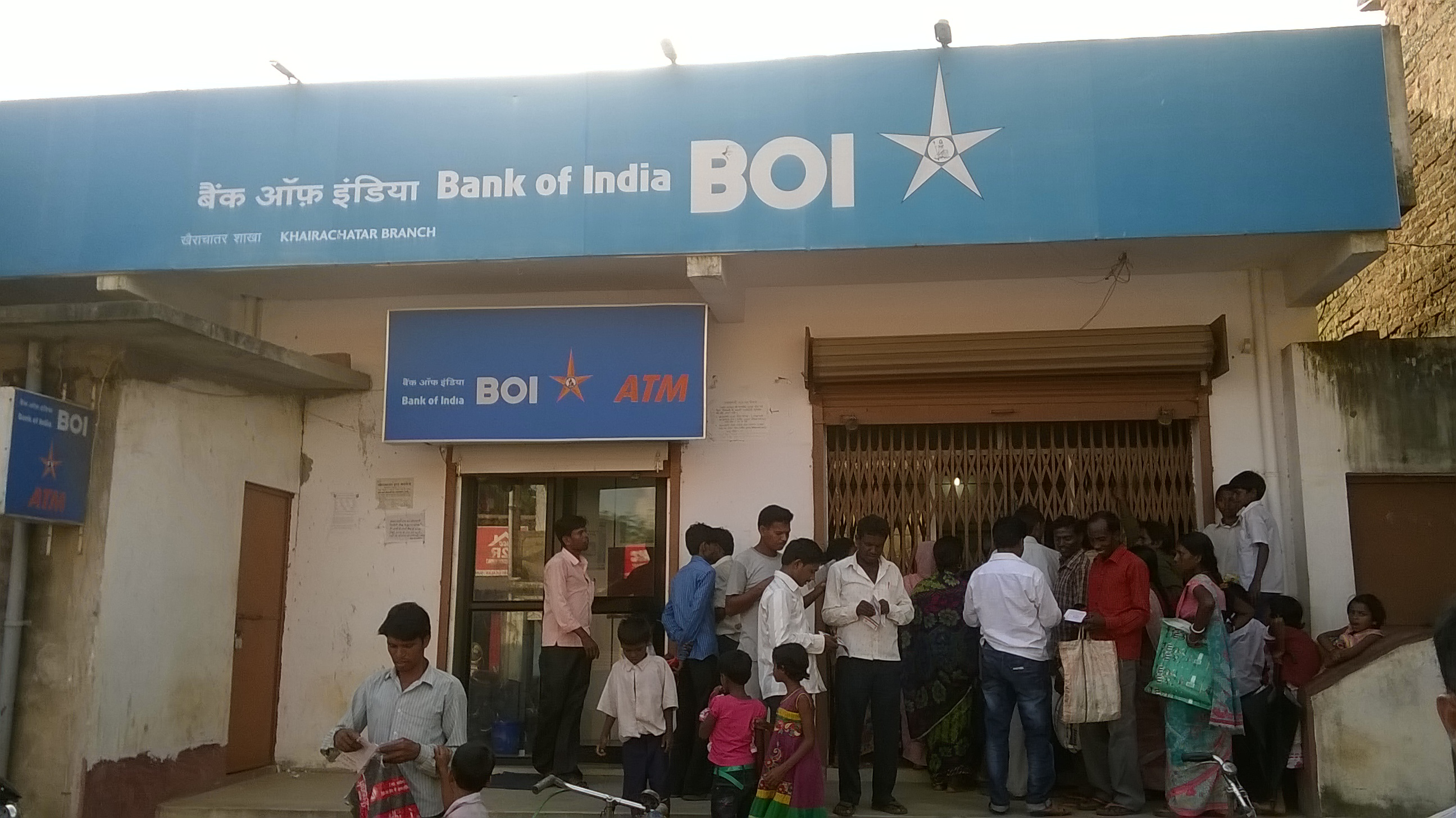
Bank of India Khairachatar
