= Astaneh Rural District =

Astaneh Rural District (Persian: دهستان آستانه) may refer to:

- Astaneh Rural District (Markazi Province)
- Astaneh Rural District (Razavi Khorasan Province)
