= Shabnam Asthana =

Indian public relations expert

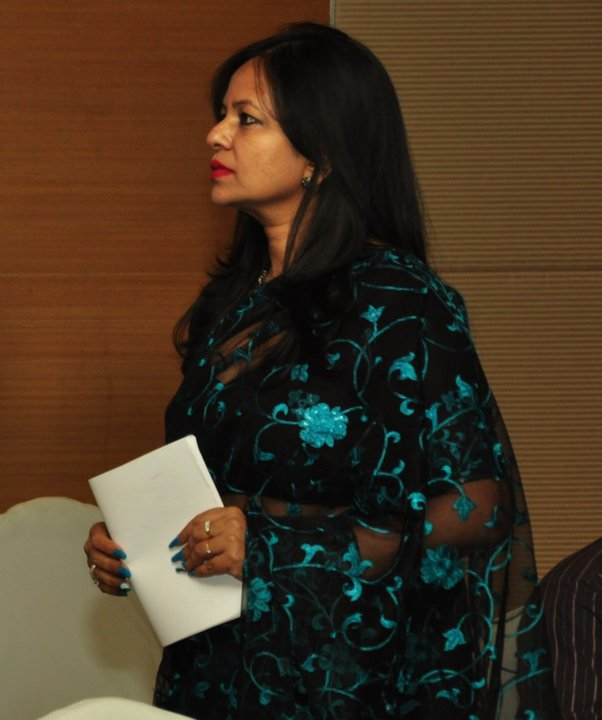
- Born: 16 August
- Occupations: PR expert, Policy and communications strategist
- Website: www.empoweredsolutions.in

Shabnam Asthana is an Indian public relations expert, speaker, and entrepreneur. In 2012, she received the National Public Relations Hall of Fame award by PRCI from H. K. Dua for her contributions in the public relations field.

== Early life and education ==
Asthana was born in Bokaro Steel City. She earned a bachelor's degree in arts from Lady Shri Ram College in 1983 and later, she earned a master's degree in arts and also studied at Symbiosis to complete a post graduate diploma in Public Relations and Advertising. She also completed a postgraduate program in marketing management from Symbiosis, Pune.

== Career ==
Asthana taught English for more than 2 years at the National Defence Academy, Khadakwasla. After leaving NDA, she worked at a few private companies and also as a freelance journalist and writer for leading newspapers and magazines. She also served as a panelist and guest faculty for Institutes and Business Schools including Symbiosis, Indira, IIBM, Sinhagad, Matrix, NIILM, D.Y Patil and others.

=== 2005-present ===
In 2005, Asthana founded Empowered Solutions. In addition to coordinating and synchronizing the functions of businesses, the company also handles public relations and draws out marketing and sales strategies for them. Her clientage includes IND TV USA, Garware Wall Ropes, Reiter, Phoenix Mecano, Premium, The Little Gym, Soukos Robots S.A, SIMC, Clover Builders, University of Pune, Funskool, NTT data and others.

In May 2017, her book, Romancing Your Career was launched by Lila Poonawalla. The book is about work experiences in the corporate world and was covered by Business Standard, DNA News, Hindustan Times, Education Times and other major media.

Asthana is often seen at conferences for entrepreneurship, public relations and women upliftment including National Summit on Startups and Women Entrepreneurship, Eurasian Economic Congress, Indian Russian Dialogue, CSR Panel Discussion, Indian Achievers' Forum's Webinar and Ahmadiya Muslim Community Conference. As of June 2020, she also writes on the Thrive Global platform.

In February 2025,, Asthana authored a biography titled Aashuutosh Srivastava: The Legal Trailblazer, which chronicles the life and professional journey of lawyer Aashuutosh Srivastava. The book explores his personal and legal battles, as well as his contributions to the legal field. It was launched on April 11, 2025, at an event attended by prominent figures from the legal and business communities. The biography received a favorable response, with particular appreciation for its detailed portrayal of Srivastava’s legal career and personal resilience.

== Accolades ==
She received the Hall of Fame award at Mumbai from The PRCI for her contributions in the public relations industry in 2012. Asthana was the first Indian to be invited at 2012 PRSSA 2012 National Conference in San Francisco. She received the Times Power Women 2017 award for Global PR from The Times Group in January 2018.

In September 2018, she received Times Power Woman 2018 award from The Times of India Group. Next month, Asthana received the Mahatma Gandhi Samman at the House of Commons in London and 2018 Pune Best Brand Awards. In April 2019, Asthana was conferred an honorary doctorate by National American University.
