= Astaneh, Jiroft =

Astaneh استانه
- Village
- Location within Iran
- Coordinates: 28°43′18″N 57°59′46″E
- Country: Iran
- Province: Kerman
- County: Jiroft
- Bakhsh: Jebalbarez
- Rural District: Saghder

Population (2006)
  - Total: 13
- Time zone: UTC+3:30 (IRST)
  - Summer (DST): UTC+4:30 (IRDT)

Astaneh (Persian: استانه, also Romanized as Āstāneh; also known as Dar Āstāneh) is a village in Saghder Rural District, Jebalbarez District, Jiroft County, Kerman Province, Iran. At the 2006 census, its population was 13, in 4 families.
