= Bokaro Steel City =

- Metropolis
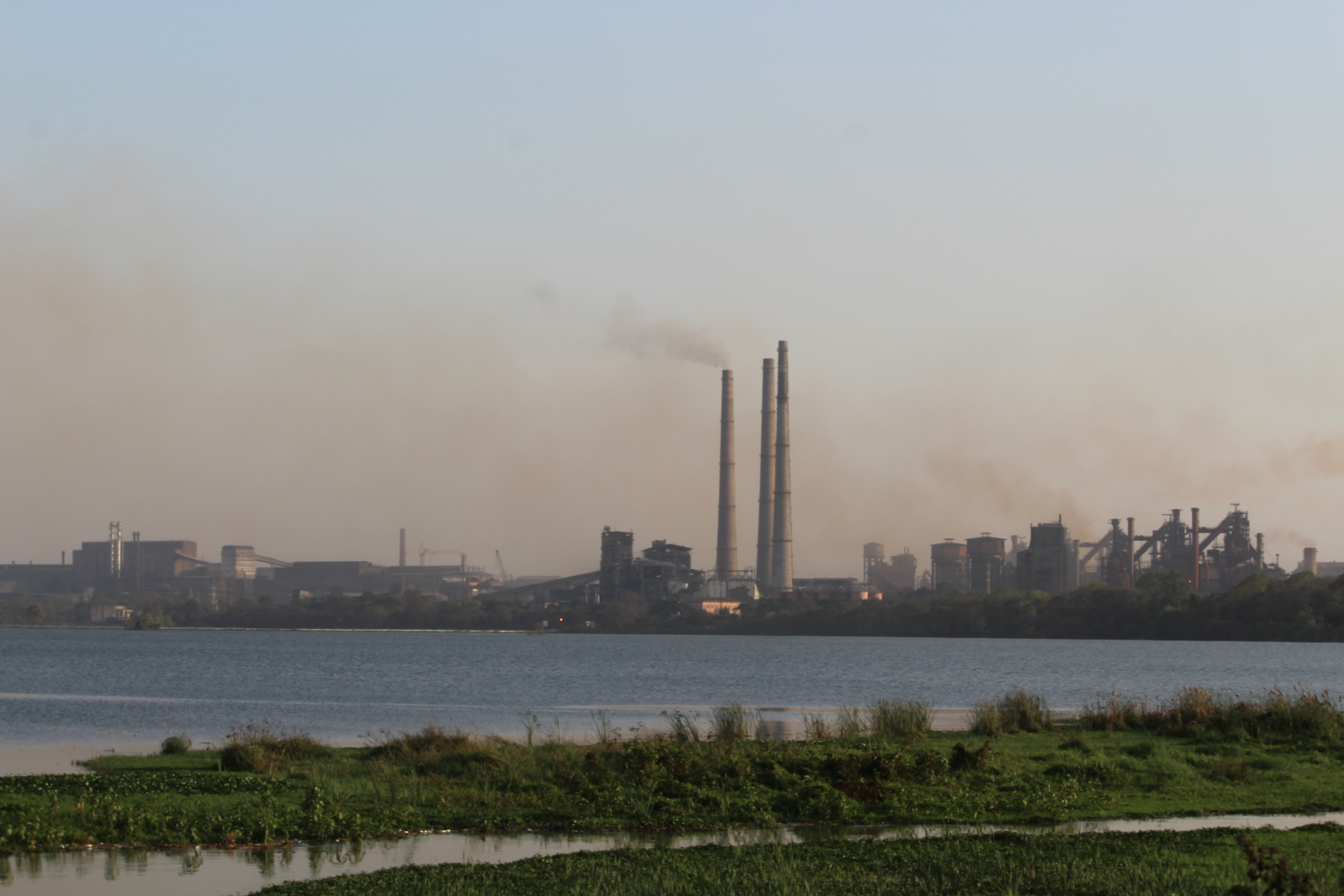
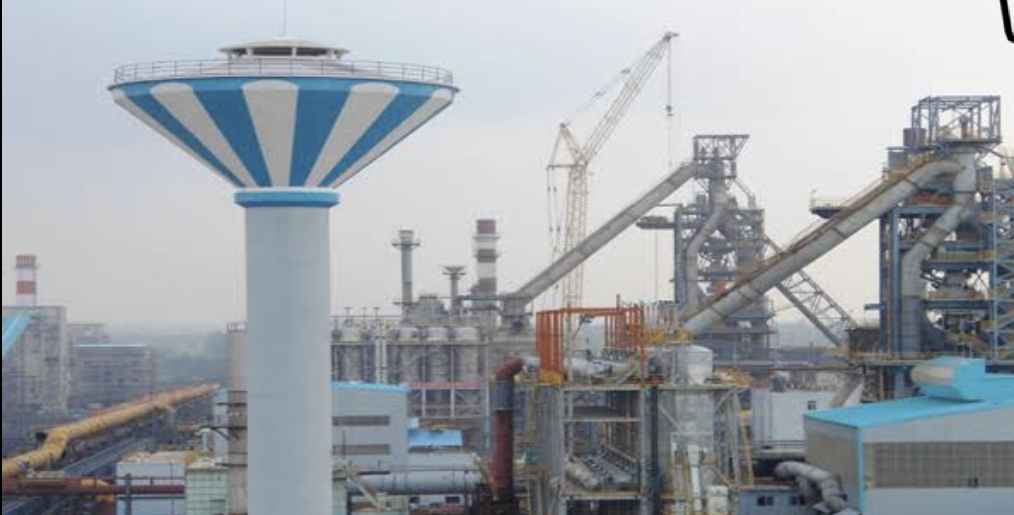
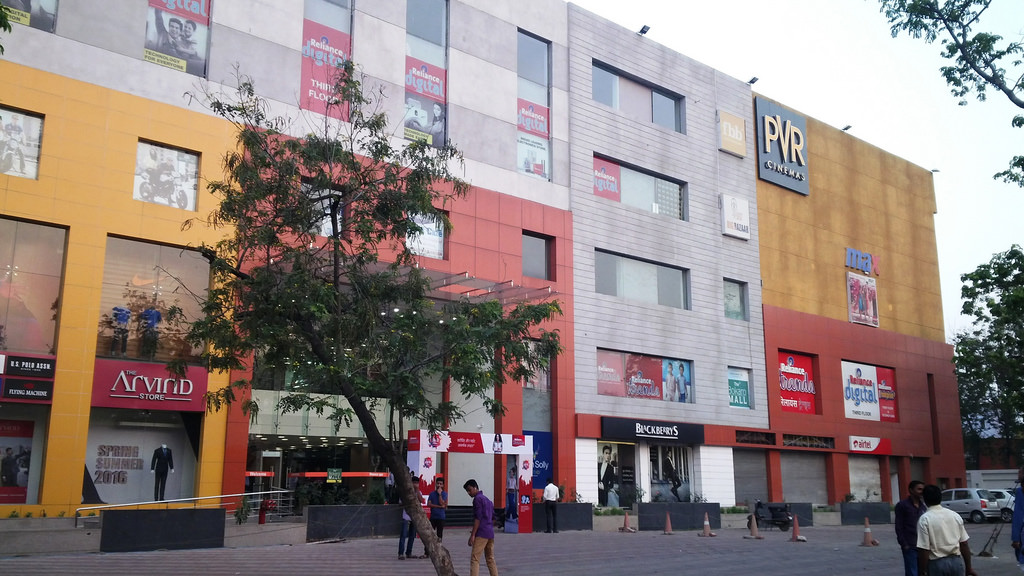
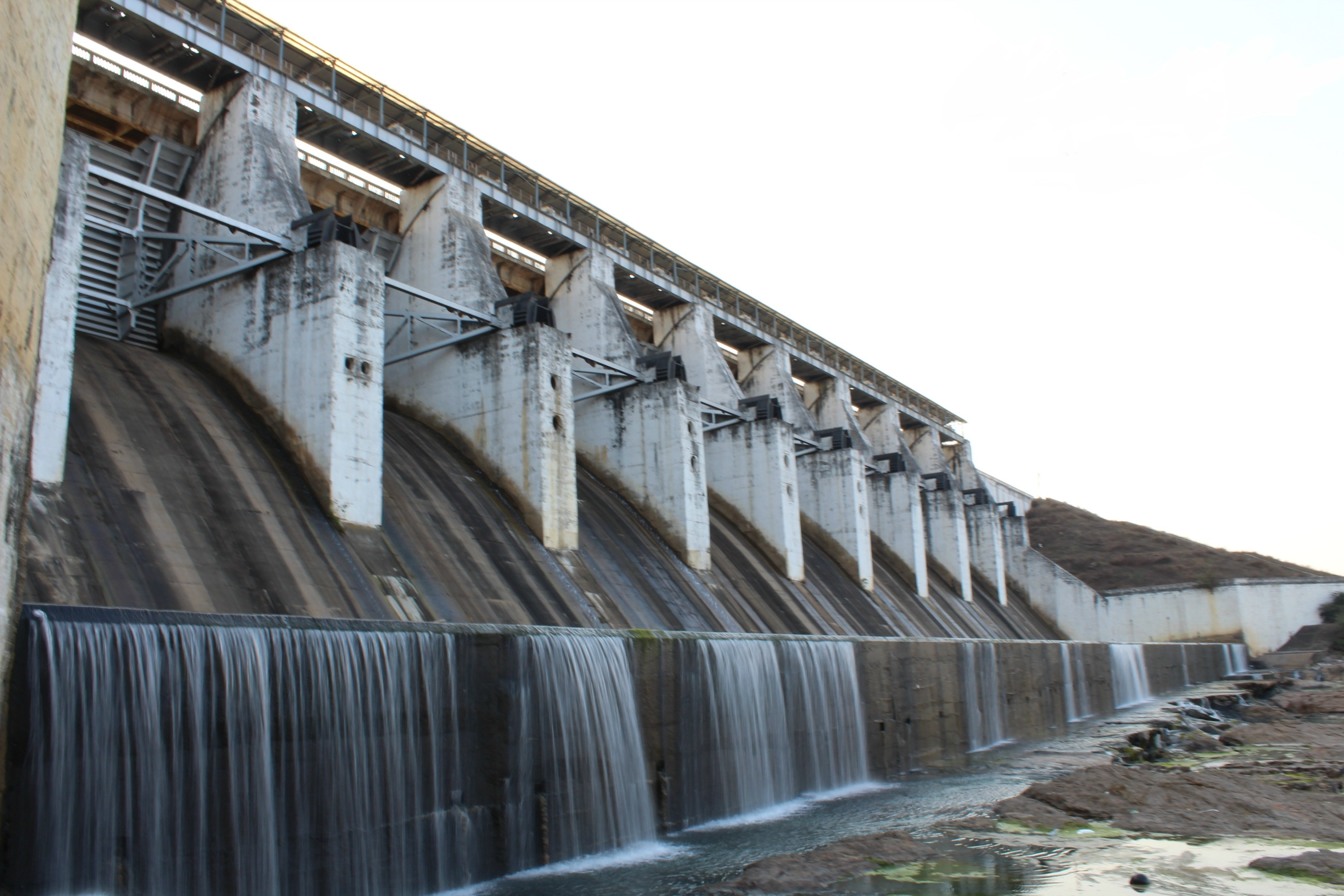
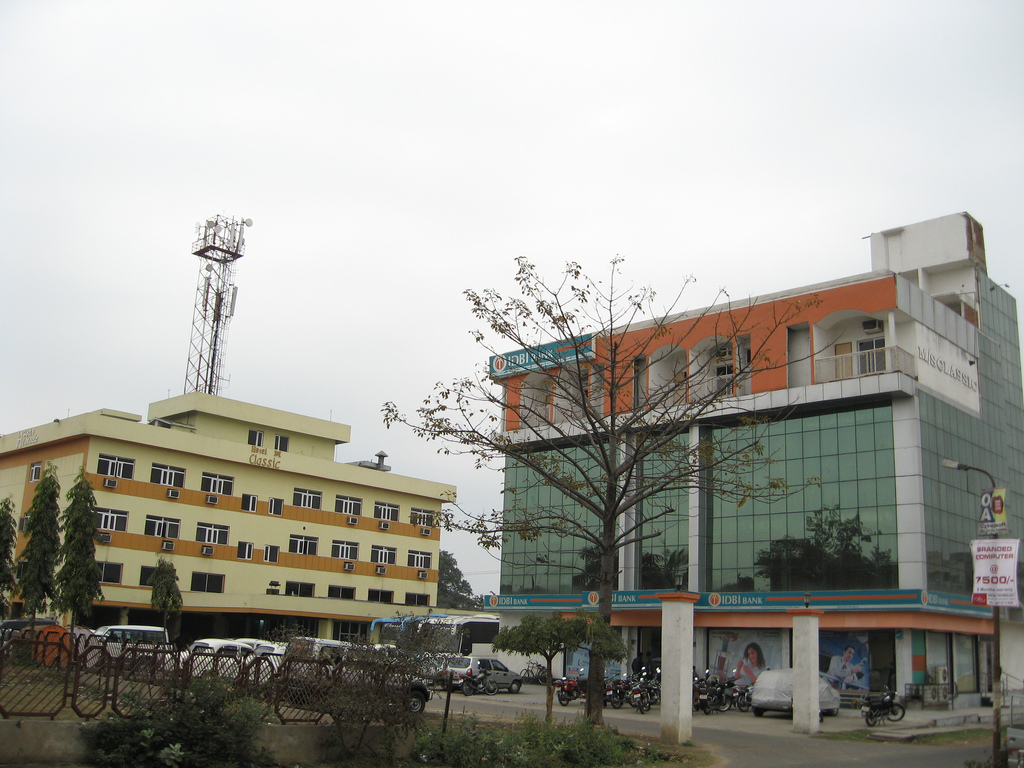
- Bokaro Steel Plant in Bokaro Steel City Vedanta ESL Steel Plant Bokaro railway station The Bokaro Mall Tenughat Dam City Centre, Bokaro

- Location in Jharkhand, India Bokaro Steel City (India)
- Coordinates: 23.67°N 86.15°E
- Country: India
- State: Jharkhand
- District: Bokaro
- Established: 1964
- Founder: Steel Authority of India
- Named for: Steel Manufacturing Sector/Gas Exploration/Coalfields

Government
  - Type: Corporate
  - Body: Steel Authority of India

Area Includes the sub urban area of Chas Municipal Corporation and Balidih Industrial Area.
  - Metropolis: 183 km^{2} (71 sq mi)
  - Rank: 5th in state
- Elevation: 210 m (690 ft)

Population
  - Metropolis: 563,417
  - Rank: 4th in state
  - Metro: 1,100,000 (proposed)
- Demonym: Bokaroite
- Time zone: UTC+5:30 (IST)
- PIN: 827 001
- Telephone/ STD code: (+91)- 06542
- Vehicle registration: JH-09
- Lok Sabha constituency: Dhanbad
- Vidhan Sabha constituency: Bokaro
- Website: bokaro.nic.in

Bokaro, officially known as Bokaro Steel City, is an industrial planned city in Jharkhand, India. With an estimated metropolitan population of 1.1 million and 183 square kilometres (71 sq mi) of area, it is the fourth largest city in the state. Bokaro is the administrative headquarters of Bokaro district. The city is located on the banks of Garga River and on the fringes of Bokaro river and is surrounded by hill ranges at Giridih and Ramgarh districts.

Marafari is the oldest settlement in Bokaro which was just a village during the time of Mughals and Sultanates. Manbhum region also covered Bokaro which was ruled by Mughal and Sultanates. Bokaro became one of the first planned cities of India started in late 1960s, with establishment of the Bokaro Steel Plant led by then prime minister Jawaharlal Nehru. After independence, it became a part of Bihar state. Today, Bokaro is the headquarters of the Bokaro District as well as Koylanchal range (Bokaro, Dhanbad and Giridih) and is also one of the headquarters of the Police IG zone, apart from Ranchi and Dumka, covering seven districts — Hazaribagh, Dhanbad, Giridih, Koderma, Chatra, Bokaro, and Ramgarh (North Chotanagpur Division).

The city is an emerging industrial and educational hub. Despite this, the city has a cosmopolitan culture with people belonging to different ethnicity from South India as well as North India, representing its unique attributes, giving the city the character of Mini India while having a strong influence of Bihari and Bengali culture.The city is also the political power centre of Jharkhand, where important politicians reside. The city hosts numerous tourist spots, which include zoo, dam, parks and shopping mall. Several big corporations operate in Bokaro. It lies on the mineral-rich Chota Nagpur Plateau and a Coal Bed Methane(Gas) reserves of 45 billion cubic metres. Bokaro has one of the most important coalfields of India in nearby areas which are Jharia, Kulti, West Bokaro, East Bokaro and Ramgarh.

== Geography ==
Cities, towns and locations in Bokaro district in North Chotanagpur Division M: municipal town, CT: census town, R: rural/ urban centre, F: Factory, A: Coal Mining Area
Abbreviation used: TPS – Thermal Power Station. Owing to space constraints in the small map, the actual locations in a larger map may vary slightly. Note: The map alongside presents some of the notable locations in the district. All places marked in the map are linked in the larger full screen map.

Bokaro district consists of undulating uplands on the Chota Nagpur Plateau with the Damodar River cutting a valley right across. It has an average elevation of 200 to 540 metres (660 to 1,770 ft) above mean sea level. The highest hill, Lugu Pahar, rises to a height of 1,070 metres (3,510 ft). The East Bokaro Coalfield located in the Bermo-Phusro area and small intrusions of Jharia Coalfield make Bokaro a coal-rich district. In 1965, one of the largest steel manufacturing units in the country, Bokaro Steel Plant, operated by Steel Authority of India Limited, was set up at Bokaro Steel City. The Damodar Valley Corporation established its first thermal power station at Bokaro (Thermal). The 5 kilometres (3.1 mi) long, 55 metres (180 ft) high earthfill dam with composite masonry cum concrete spillway, Tenughat Dam, across the Damodar River, is operated by the Government of Jharkhand. The average annual rainfall is 1,291.2 millimetres (50.83 in). The soil is generally infertile and agriculture is mostly rain-fed.

Bokaro Steel City is located at 23.67°N 86.15°E. The city stands at an elevation of 210 metres (690 feet) above sea level and has an urban area of 183 square kilometres (71 square miles). Bounded on the east by Dhanbad and Purulia, on the west by Ramgarh and Hazaribagh, on the north by Giridih and on the south by Ranchi. It is accessible through National Highway NH-143 and NH-18. The city has the total area of 183 km. It includes the suburban area of Chas Municipal Corporation. There are many national highways crossing the city of Bokaro. Each sector has shopping centres, playgrounds, schools, recreational areas and health centres as entire city is planned with avenues and residential areas as well as commercial areas. Bokaro was one of the first planned cities in the state of Jharkhand.

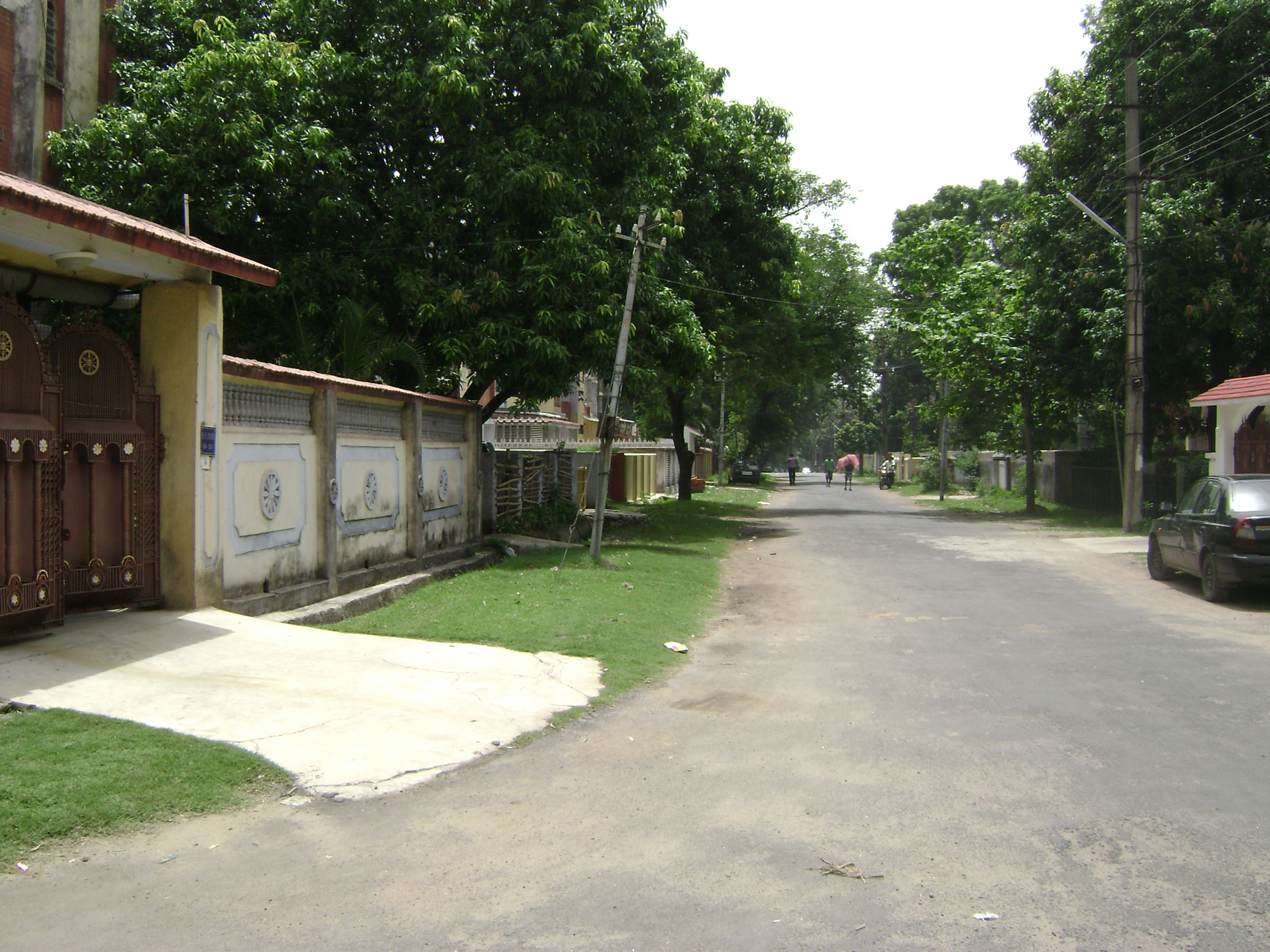
Sector 4D, SAIL Township built in late 1970s

== Demographics ==
Languages of Bokaro Steel City - CT (2011)
1. Hindi (35.4%)
2. Khorta (25.5%)
3. Magahi (10.2%)
4. Urdu (6.70%)
5. Bengali (6.20%)
6. Santali (5.50%)
7. Maithili (3.50%)
8. Other inc Angika, Ho (7.00%)

According to the 2011 Census of India, Bokaro Steel City is the 86th largest urban agglomeration in India, and the 4th largest city in Jharkhand.

According to the 2011 Census of India, Bokaro Steel City Urban Agglomeration had a total population of 563,417, of which males were 299,232 and females 264,185. Bokaro Steel City Urban Agglomeration is composed of Bokaro Steel City (Census Town), Chas (Nagar Nigam) and Bandhgora (CT). The UA had an effective literacy rate (7+ population) of 84.87%, with male literacy of 92.27% and female literacy of 76.50%. A new metropolitan area of Bokaro has been planned named Greater Bokaro and population is expected to be around 1,100,000.

Bokaro Steel City had a population of 413,934, of which males were 220,088 and females were 193,846. Population in the age range of 0-6 was 48,834. The effective literacy rate (7+ population) was 84.94%, with male literacy of 92.35% and female literacy of 76.54%.

The major languages spoken are Hindi, Khortha, Urdu, Bengali, Santhali and Maithili with Hindi and Santali have official status and Urdu as second official language. A Russian colony was located in the city housing Soviet communities. Kannada, Tamil, Malayalam and Telugu speaking and various other South Indian communities also settled in the city.

== Infrastructure ==
According to the District Census Handbook 2011, Bokaro, Bokaro Steel City covered an area of 162.91 km^{2}. Among the civic amenities, it had 415 km roads with both open and closed drains, the protected water supply involved tapwater from treated and untreated sources, overhead tank, service reservoir. It had 67,083 domestic electric connections, 10,283 road lighting points. Among the medical facilities, it had 9 hospitals (with 1,200 beds), 2 dispensaries, 2 health centres, 1 family welfare centre, 1 maternity and child welfare centre, 1 maternity home, 5 nursing homes (with 120 beds), 30 medicine shops. It had 1 polytechnic, 2 recognised shorthand, typewriting and vocational training centres, 1 non-formal educational centre (Sarva Siksha Abhiyan). Among the social, recreational and cultural facilities it had 2 stadiums, 3 cinema theatres, 8 auditorium/ community halls, 9 public libraries, 9 reading rooms. An important commodity it produced was steel products. It had the branch offices of 30 nationalised banks, 12 private commercial banks, 1 cooperative bank.

== Economy ==
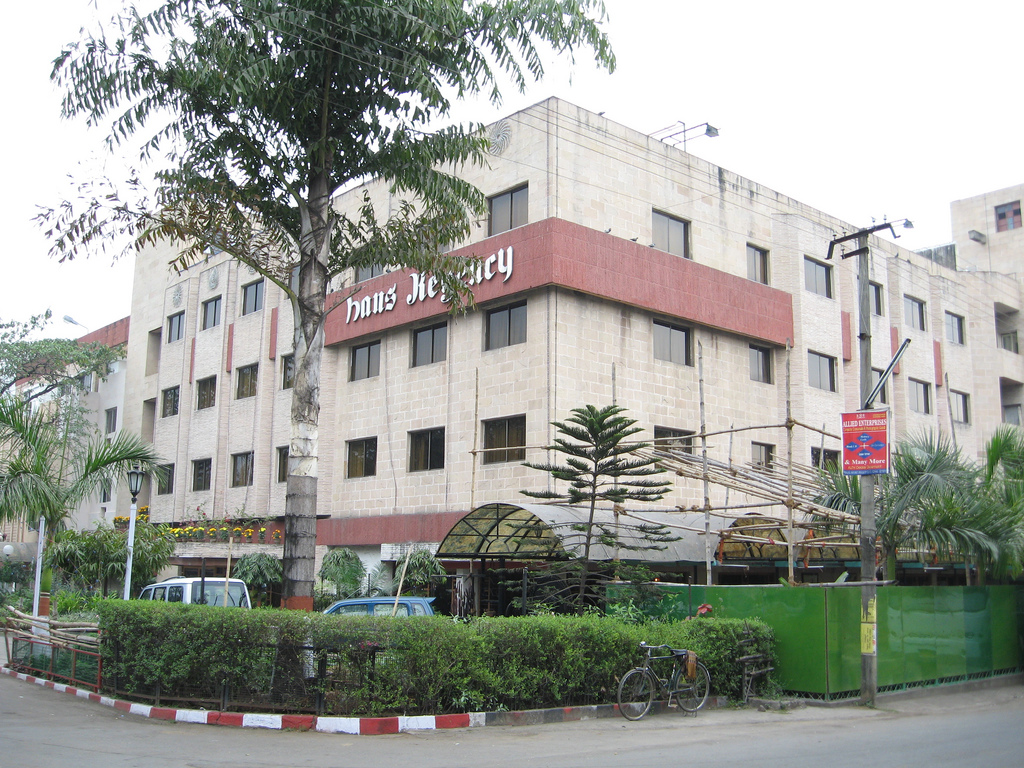
Hans Regency luxury hotel

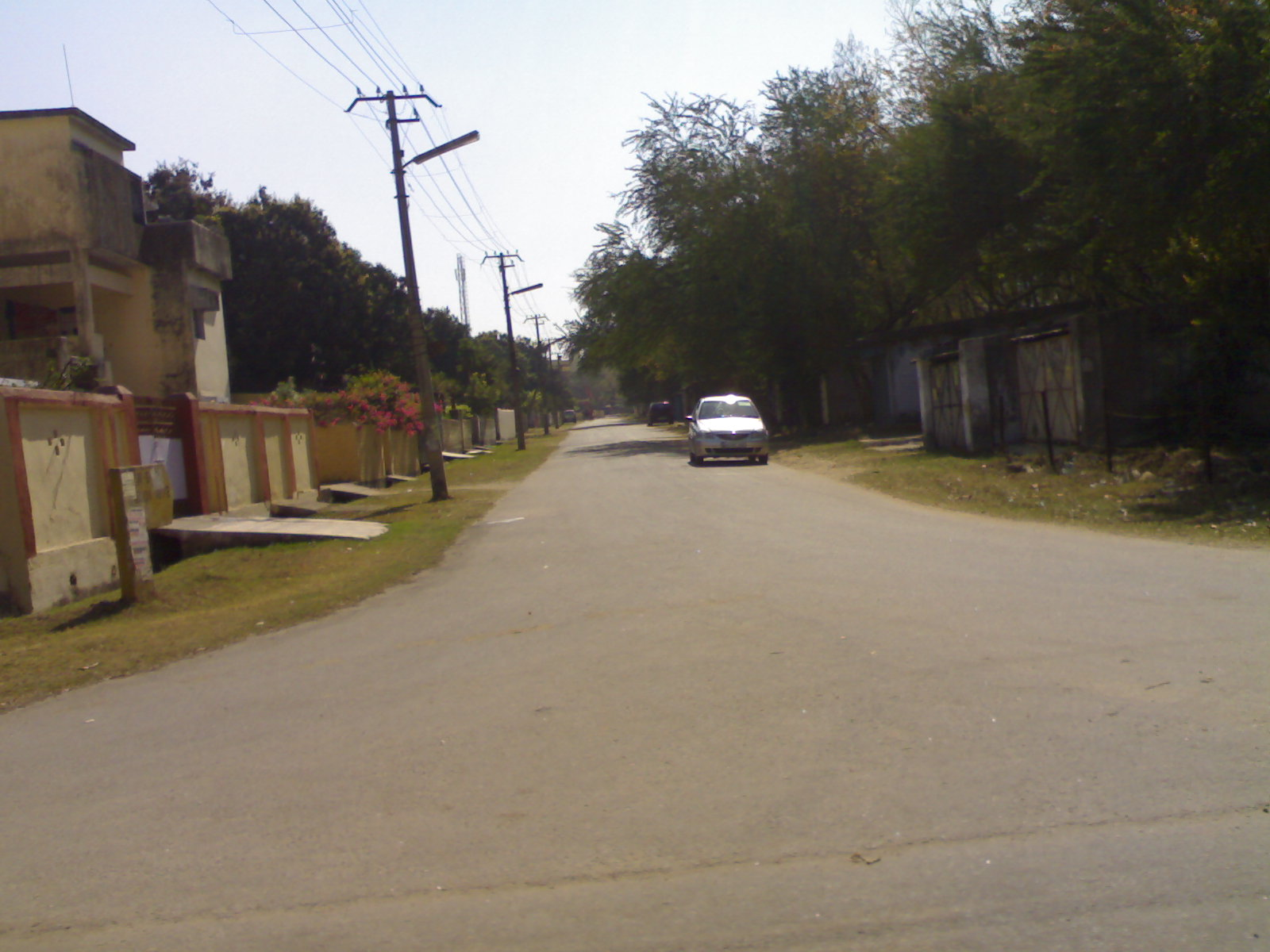
Sector 4G, part of Planned SAIL Township

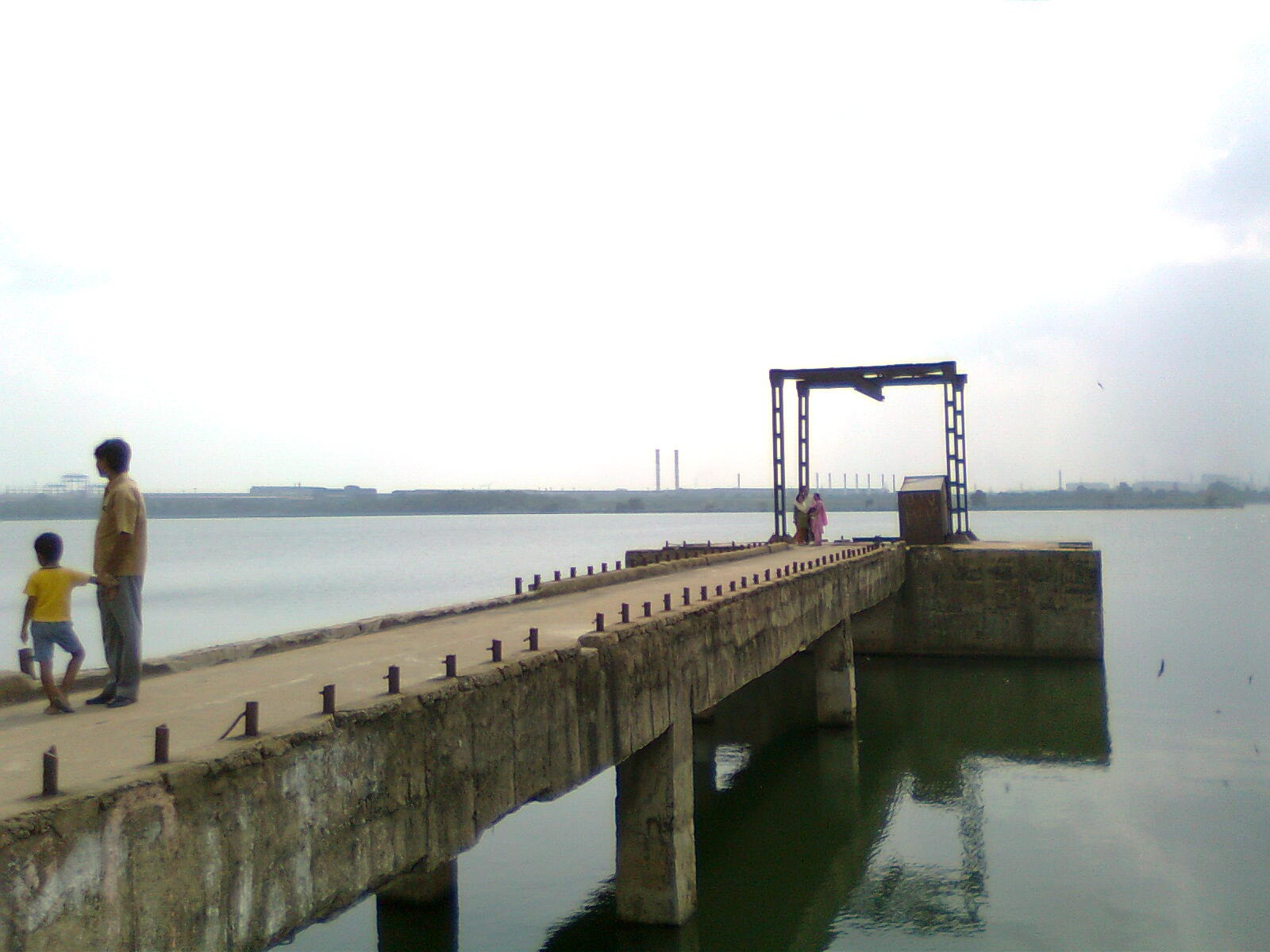
Cooling pond 2 in Sector 4

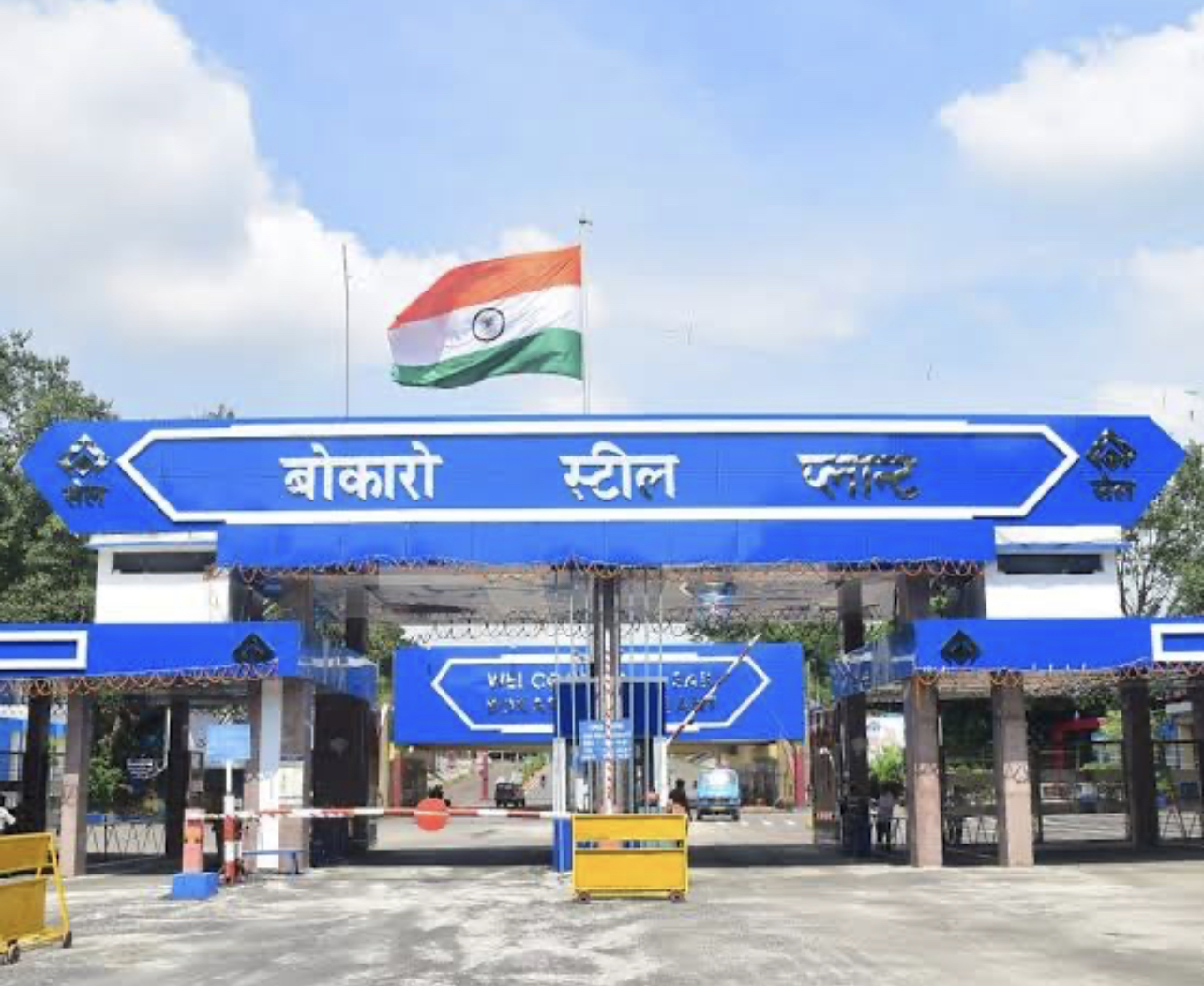
Bokaro Steel Plant main gate, commonly known as Steel Gate ay Bokaro Steel Plant - SAIL

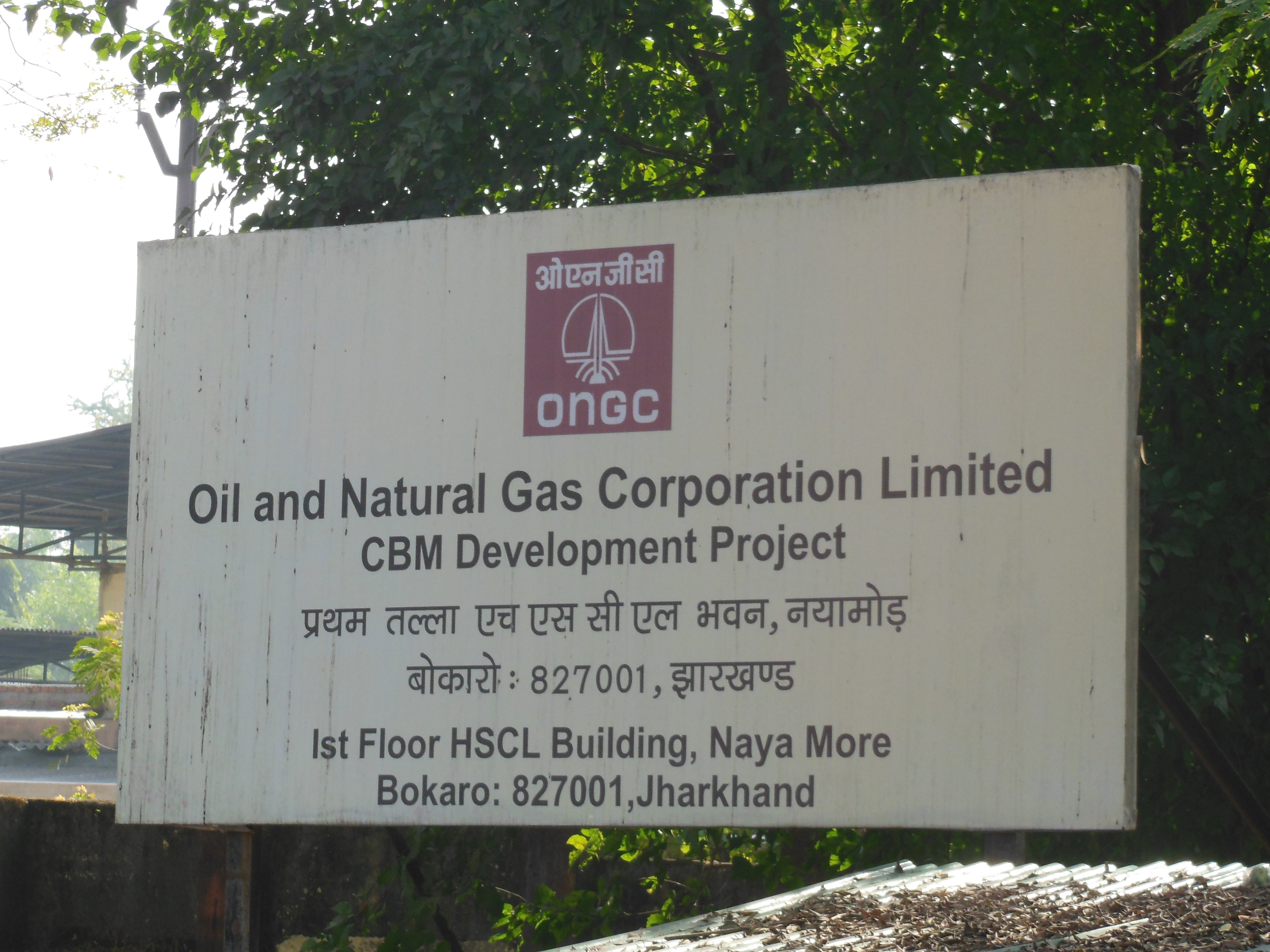
Oil and Natural Gas Corporation (ONGC) at Marafari

The economy of the city is primarily dependent on the integrated steel plant established by Steel Authority of India. The Bokaro Steel Plant was established with the collaboration of Soviet Union when the First Prime Minister Jawahar Lal Nehru desired to establish a steel plant in the region. Bokaro Steel Plant expansion to extend its capacity from 4.5 million metric tons to 7.5 million metric tonnes in 2010–2011.

Vedanta Electrosteel Castings Limited - A Kolkata-based water pipe manufacturer acquired 2,500 acres (10 square kilometres) of land 18 kilometres (11 miles) from the city and has erected its 2.2 MTPA steel plant. The company has invested close to Rs 80 Bn (US$1.6 Bn) on this project which was operational from 2010.

ONGC Bokaro operates the Bokaro Coal Bed Methane (CBM) block BK-CBM-2001/1 with 80 per cent stake while the remaining 20 per cent is with Indian Oil Corp (IOC). It plans to invest ₨ 8.23 billion from 2017 to 2018 to achieve a peak production of 0.9 million standard cubic meters per day. Dalmia Cement Bharat Limited (DCBL) operates a 1.5 Million Tonne cement plant at Bokaro utilising slag supply from Bokaro Steel Plant.

Inox Air Products, India's largest manufacturers of industrial and medical gases, has a Cryogenic Air Separation Unit (ASU) at the Steel Authority of India's (SAIL) Bokaro plant.

=== Future projects ===
SAIL-POSCO JV Steel Plant: Steel minister Sri Virbhadra Singh has announced another new steel plant for Bokaro as part of a joint venture with Posco and SAIL by using FINEX technologies for high quality steel. The capacity of the plant will be 1.5 mt, establish in BSP periphery of 500 acres (2.0 km^{2}).

Bharat Petroleum Corporation Limited - BPCL will set up a LPG bottling plant and POL (petroleum, oil and lubricants) terminal in Bokaro, the foundation stone of which was laid on 11 August 2019.

Software Technology Parks of India - STPI will set up an IT Park.

== Transport ==
=== Air ===
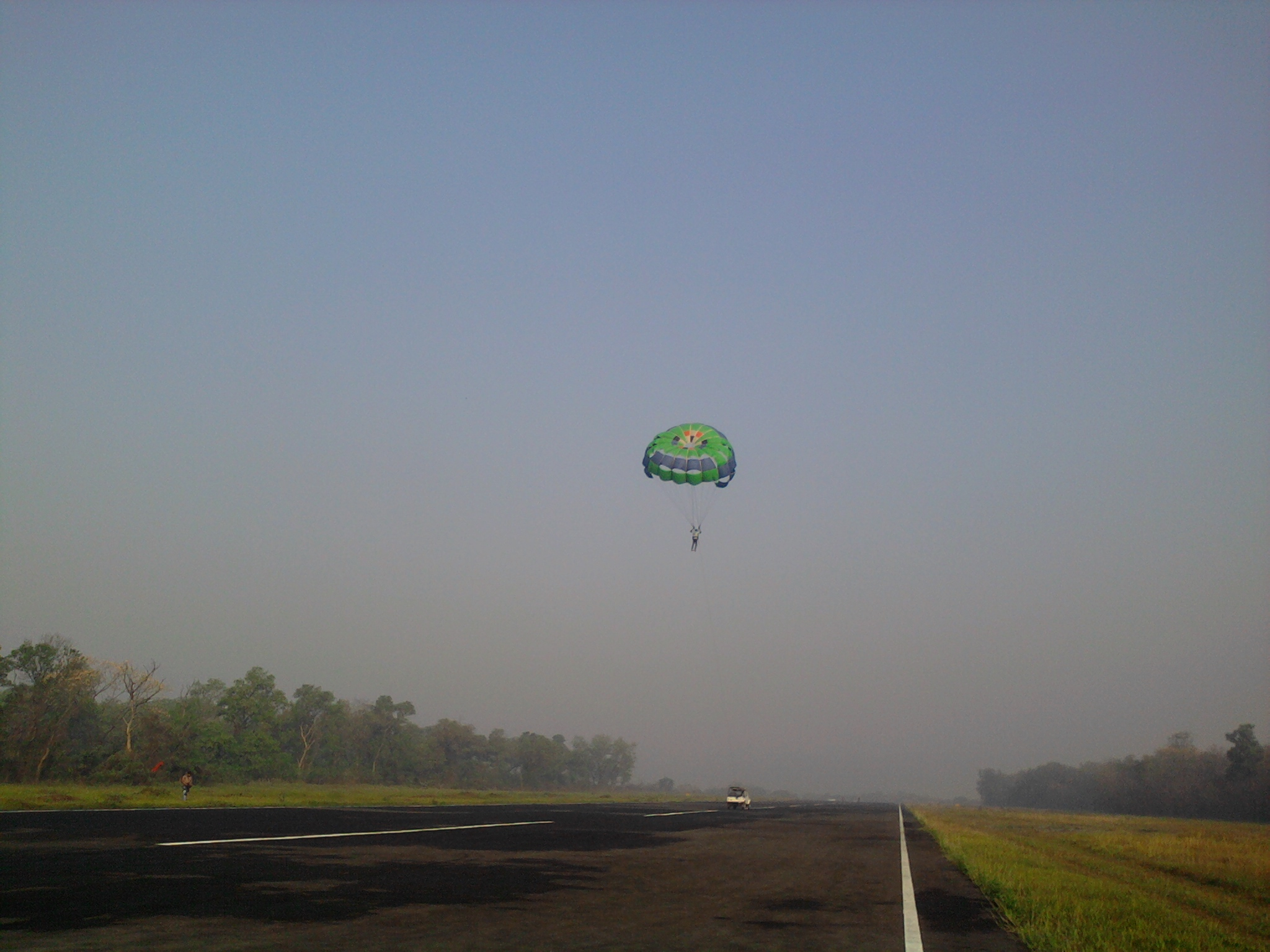
Bokaro Airport Runway

The nearest commercial airport is at Ranchi, named Birsa Munda Airport, at a distance of 120 km. Bokaro Airport is an unserviced airport with no scheduled commercial flights. However, the Government of India has planned to connect Bokaro to the regional hub of Patna and an international airport in Kolkata through the UDAN regional airport development scheme, opening the airport up could see commercial flights in the near future.

The airline SpiceJet has been awarded under the second phase of the UDAN Scheme to cater the unserved market of Bokaro. SpiceJet starts direct flight between Kolkata and Lilabari under UDAN scheme. (However, the airport is still not operable in 2025.)

=== Railway ===
Bokaro Steel City Railway Station Entrance

Bokaro Steel City railway station lies at the edge of the Jharia Coalfield and serves the residents of Bokaro and the surrounding mining-industrial area. It is a A-category railway station, with amenities including escalators, A.C waiting rooms, a food court, charging points, a foot over-bridge, and computerised ticket reservation counters. The railway station is operated by the South Eastern Railway of the Indian Railways, and provides connectivity to neighbouring states and major metropolitan areas such as Delhi, Kolkata, Mumbai and Chennai.

=== Road ===
Dhanbad-Bokaro-Ranchi-Jamshedpur Mega Industrial Corridor Expressway was completed till Bokaro in 2018 and Bokaro-Dhanbad expansion to 6 lanes was completed in 2022. Bokaro Bus Stand is a private bus stand and land acquisition is being done in Sector-12 for new bus stand. National Highway-18 (old NH-32) and National Highway-23 which is a 4-laned.

Distance of Bokaro from key neighbouring cities
Major City	Distance (in km)
Ranchi	110
Dhanbad	45
Giridih	110
Jamshedpur	135
Patna	370
Gaya	230
Kolkata	310
Asansol	102
Bankura	132
Hazaribagh	130
Durgapur	150

== Education ==
Among the educational facilities it had 43 primary schools, 44 middle schools, 45 secondary schools, 22 senior secondary schools, 3 general degree colleges. Notable schools in the city are - Chinmaya Vidyalaya, DAV Public School, Delhi Public School and St. Xavier's School.

== Sports ==
- Mohan Kumar Mangalam Stadium is a multi-purpose stadium in sector 4, the heart of the city.
- Senapati Cricket Stadium and cricket academy was constructed in 1995 and is currently maintained by Steel Authority of India.

== Gallery ==
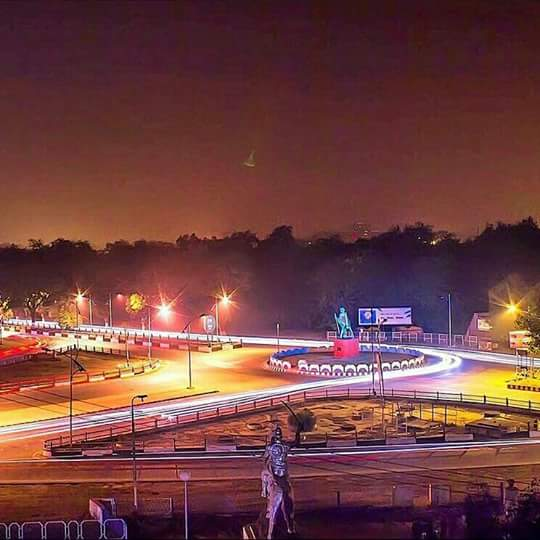
Bokaro Steel City at Night

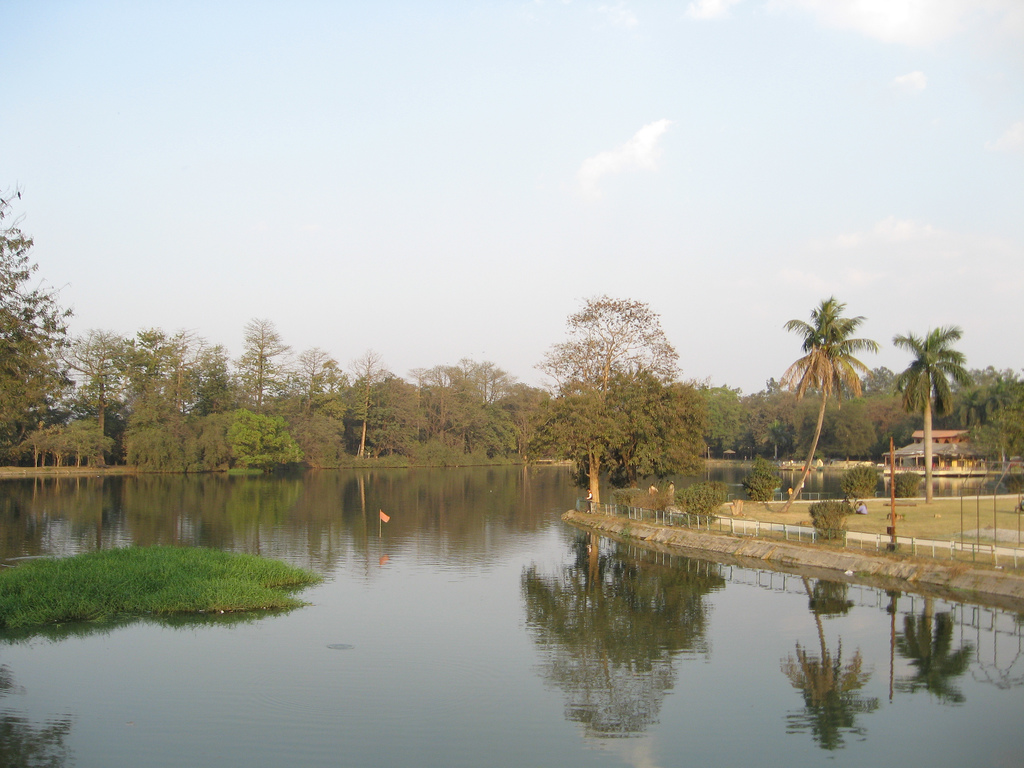
City Park

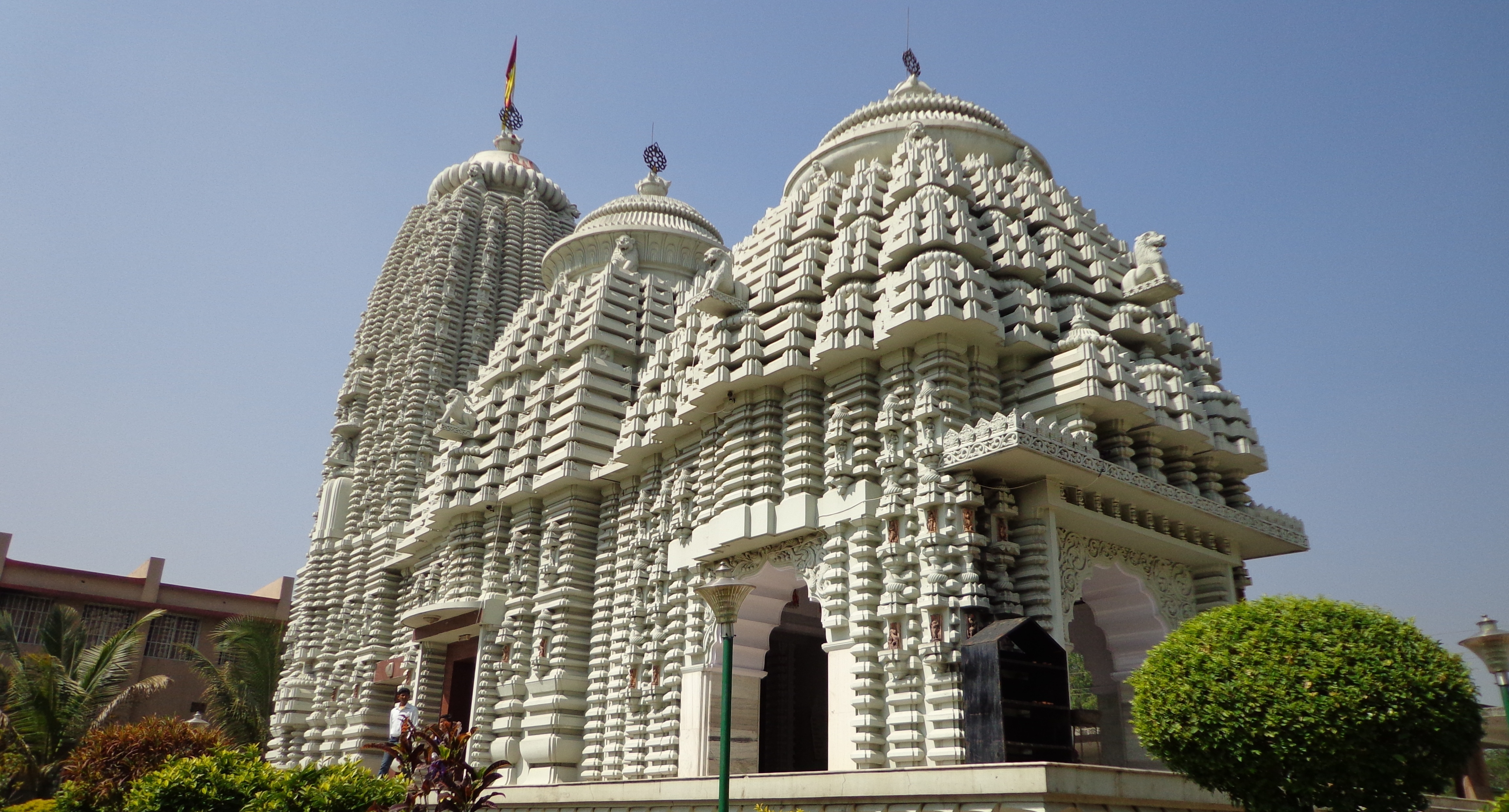
Jagannath Mandir

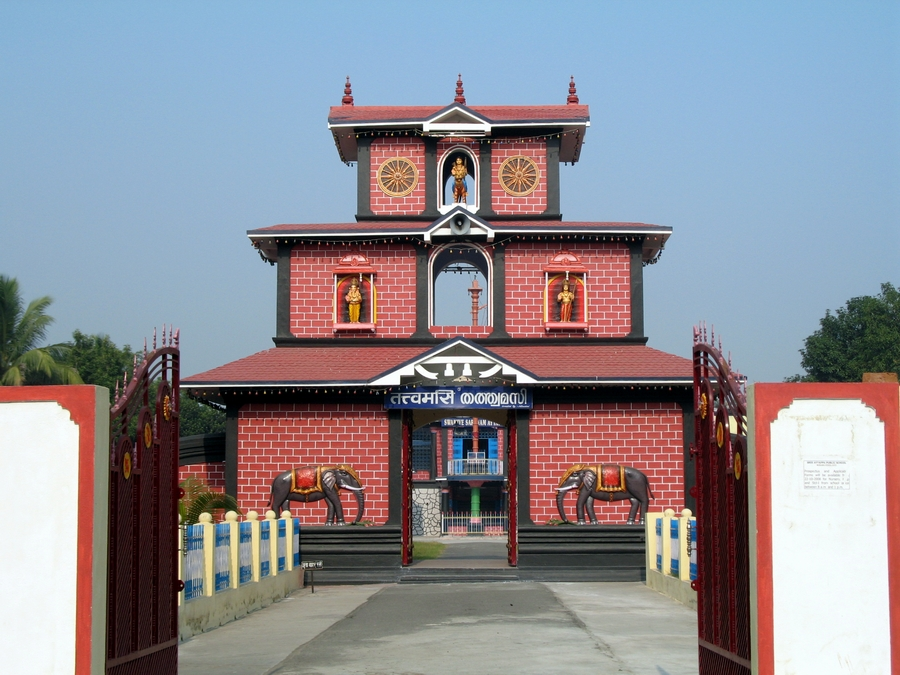
Ayyappan temple

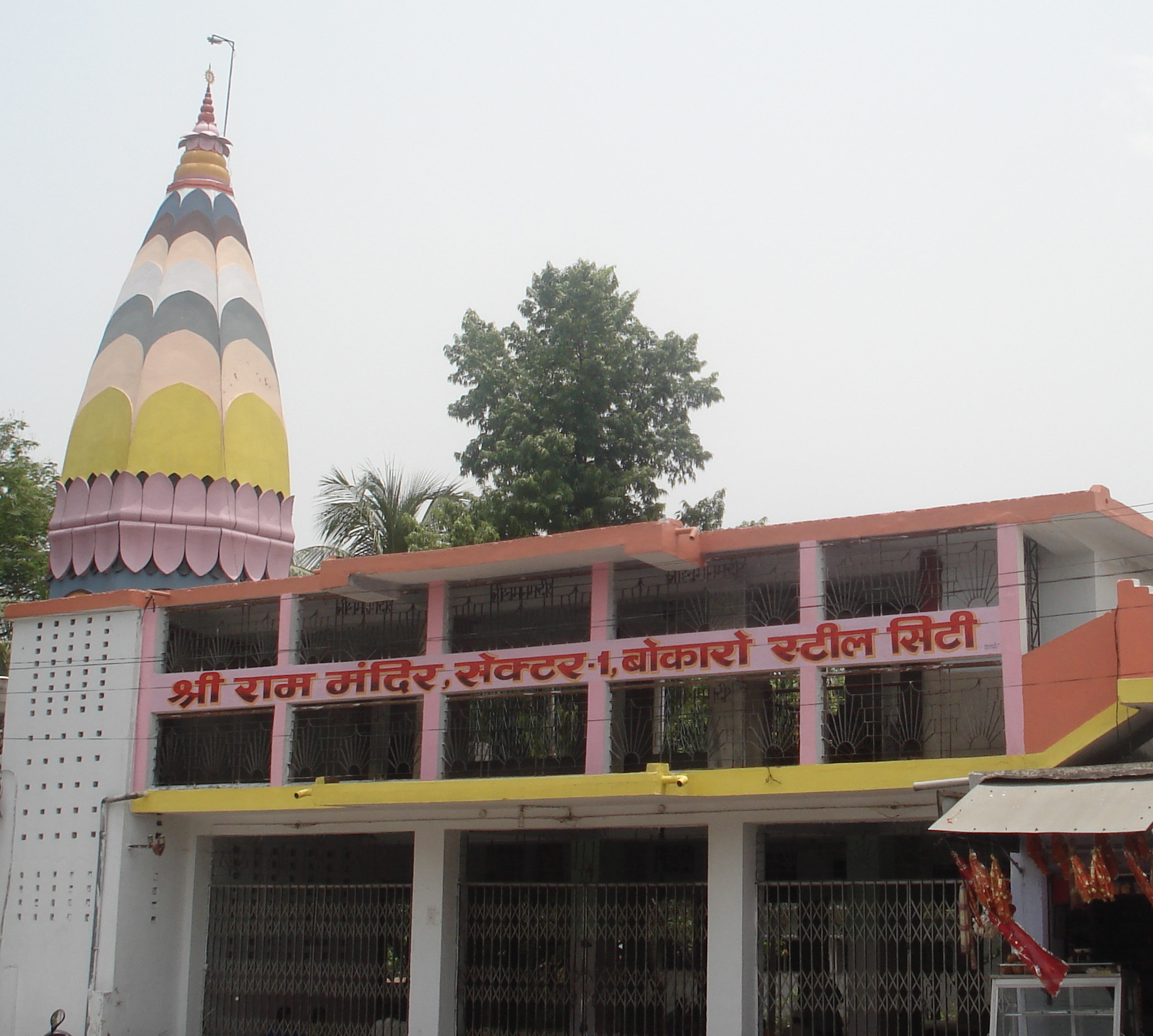
Ram Mandir

== Notable people ==
- Shabnam Asthana, public relation expert, speaker and entrepreneur.
- Arundhati Bhattacharya, banker and former chairperson of the State Bank of India
- Kumar Deobrat, Ranchi Jharkhand team captain
- Prakash Jha, Bollywood producer, actor, director and screenwriter
- Chetan Joshi, Indian classical musician
- Sumit Kumar, cricketer of Jharkhand team
- Shahbaz Nadeem, Indian cricketer and member of Delhi Daredevils player.
- Sambit Patra, politician, BJP national spokesperson
- Kaveri Priyam, an Indian actress who primarily works in Hindi television
- Samresh Singh, former MP and minister
- Shishir Parkhie - A widely acclaimed Indian Ghazal singer, composer and live performer.
- Peter Thangaraj, Indian footballer, Olympian and Arjuna awardee
- Imran Zahid, Bollywood actor & theatre artist
