= Rihand Thermal Power Station =

Coal power plant in Uttar Pradesh, India

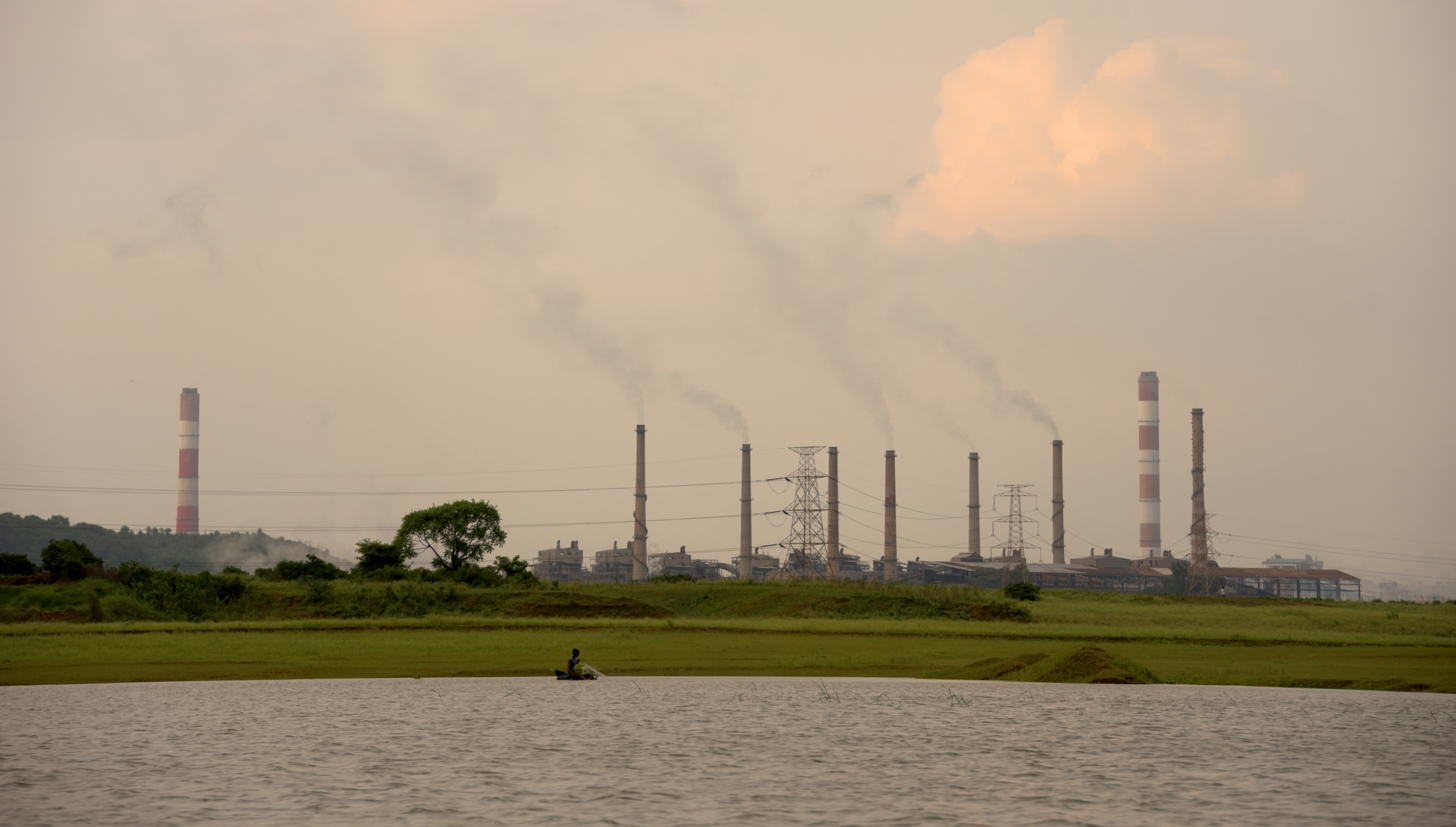
- Official name: Rihand Super Thermal Power Project
- Country: India
- Location: Renukut, Sonebhadra, UP Sonebhadra, Uttar Pradesh
- Coordinates: 24°01′36″N 82°47′24″E
- Status: Operational
- Commission date: 1988
- Construction cost: ₹1,033 crore
- Owner: NTPC

Thermal power station
- Primary fuel: Coal

Power generation
- Units operational: 6×500 MW
- Make and model: NEC of UK; Northern Engineering Industries; BHEL
- Nameplate capacity: 3,000 MW

External links
- Website: www.ntpc.co.in

Rihand Super Thermal Power Project is located at Renukut, Sonebhadra, in Sonbhadra district in Indian state of Uttar Pradesh. It is one of the coal based power plants of NTPC Limited.

== Power plant ==
Rihand Super Thermal Power Station has an installed capacity of 3,000 MW. The first unit was commissioned in March 1988. The coal for the plant is derived from Amlori and Dudhichua mines. The water source is Rihand Reservoir on the Sone River.

== Installed capacity ==
| Stage | Unit number | Installed capacity (MW) | Date of commissioning | Status |
|---|---|---|---|---|
| 1st | 1 | 500 | 1988 1 March | Running |
| 1st | 2 | 500 | 1989 July | Running |
| 2nd | 3 | 500 | 2005 January | Running |
| 2nd | 4 | 500 | 2005 September | Running |
| 3rd | 5 | 500 | 2012 May | Running |
| 3rd | 6 | 500 | 2013 October | Running |

NTPC Rihand is situated 75 km away from Renukoot railway station. By personal cab or public transport bus, one can reach Rihand Nagar. The local market outside NTPC township is Bijpur.

== See also ==
- Kudgi Super Thermal Power Station
- Singrauli Super Thermal Power Station
- Badarpur Thermal power plant
- NTPC Dadri
- Feroj Gandhi Unchahar Thermal Power Plant
- Tanda Thermal Power Plant
- Vindhyachal Super Thermal Power Station
- Korba Super Thermal Power Plant
- Sipat Thermal Power Plant
- NTPC Ramagundam
- Simhadri Super Thermal Power Plant
- Kahalgaon Super Thermal Power Station
- Talcher Thermal Power Station
