= NTPC Limited =

Indian government entity governing electricity generation

- Formerly: National Thermal Power Corporation
- Type: Central Public Sector Undertaking
- Traded as: BSE: 532555; NSE: NTPC; BSE SENSEX Constituent; NSE NIFTY 50 Constituent
- ISIN: INE733E01010
- Industry: Electricity
- Founded: 7 November 1975; 50 years ago
- Headquarters: New Delhi, India
- Area served: India
- Key people: Gurdeep Singh (Chairman & MD)
- Services: Electricity generation and distribution, mining natural gas exploration, production, transportation and distribution
- Revenue: ▼₹187,385 crore (US$19 billion) (2026)
- Operating income: ▲₹54,270 crore (US$5.6 billion) (2026)
- Net income: ▲₹27,546 crore (US$2.9 billion) (2026)
- Total assets: ▲₹558,644 crore (US$58 billion) (2026)
- Total equity: ▲₹203,176 crore (US$21 billion) (2026)
- Owner: Government of India
- Number of employees: 10,799 (2026)
- Subsidiaries: THDC India Limited; NSPCL
- Website: ntpc.co.in

NTPC Limited, formerly known as National Thermal Power Corporation, is an Indian central Public Sector Undertaking (PSU) owned by the Ministry of Power and the Government of India, which is engaged in the generation of electricity and other activities. The headquarters of the PSU are situated at New Delhi. NTPC's core function is the generation and distribution of electricity to State Electricity Boards in India. The body also undertakes consultancy and turnkey project contracts that involve engineering, project management, construction management, and operation and management of power plants.

It is the largest power company in India, with an installed capacity of 80,154.50 MW. Although the company has approximately 16% of the total national capacity, it contributes to over 25% of total power generation due to its focus on operating its power plants at higher efficiency levels (approximately 80.2% against the national PLF rate of 64.5%). NTPC currently produces 25 billion units of electricity per month.

NTPC Mining Ltd (NML) has mined about 100 MMT coal in 2023-2024 FY, NML has Pakri Barwadih, Chatti Bariatu and Kerandari Coal Mines in Jharkhand, Dulanga Coal Mine in Odisha and Talaipalli Coal Mine in Chhattisgarh. NTPC currently operates 55 power stations: 24 coal, seven combined cycle gas and liquid fuel, two hydro powered, one wind turbine, and 11 solar projects. Additionally, it has 9 coal and 1 gas station, owned by joint ventures or subsidiaries.

It was founded by the Government of India in 1975, which now holds 51.10% of its equity shares after divestment of its stake in 2004, 2010, 2013, 2014, 2016, and 2017. In May 2010, NTPC was conferred Maharatna status by the Union Government of India, one of only four companies to be awarded this status. It is ranked 433rd in the Forbes Global 2000 for 2023.

== History ==
=== 1975–1994 ===
The company was founded on 7 November 1975 by India's former Prime Minister Indira Gandhi as National Thermal Power Corporation Private Limited. It started working on its first thermal power project in 1976 at Shaktinagar—named National Thermal Power Corporation Private Limited Singrauli—in Uttar Pradesh. In the same year, its name was changed to "National Thermal Power Corporation Limited". In 1983, NTPC began commercial operations and earned profits of INR 4.5 crores in FY 1982–83. By the end of 1985, it had achieved power generation capacity of 2000 MW.
In 1986, it completed synchronisation of its first 500 MW unit at Singrauli. In 1988, it commissioned two 500 MW units, one each in Rihand and Ramagundam. In 1989, it started a consultancy division. In 1992, it acquired Feroze Gandhi Unchahar Thermal Power Station from Uttar Pradesh Rajya Vidyut Utpadan Nigam of Uttar Pradesh. By the end of 1994, its installed capacity crossed 15,000 MW.

=== 1995–2004 ===
In 1995, it took over the Talcher Thermal Power Station from Orissa State Electricity Board. In the year 1997, the Government of India conferred it with "Navratna" status. In that same year, it achieved a milestone of generating 100 billion units of electricity in a single year. In 1998, it commissioned its first Naptha-based plant at Kayamkulam with a capacity of 350 MW. In 1999, its plant in Dadri, which had the highest plant load factor (PLF) in India of 96%, was certified with ISO-14001. During 2000, it started construction of its first hydro-electric power project, with 800 MW capacity, in Himachal Pradesh.
In 2002, it incorporated 3 subsidiary companies: NTPC Electric Supply Company Limited for forward integration by entering into the business of distribution and trading of power; NTPC Vidyut Vyapar Nigam Limited for meeting the expected rise in energy trading; and NTPC Hydro Limited to carry out the business of implementing and operating small and medium hydropower projects. Later in 2002, its installed capacity crossed 20,000 MW.

NTPC got listed on BSE and NSE on 5 November 2004. Against the issue price of ₹62 per share, it closed the first day of listing with ₹75.55 per share. On the day of listing, it became the third largest company in India in terms of market capitalisation.

=== 2005–present ===
In October 2005, the company's name was changed from National Thermal Power Corporation Limited to NTPC Limited. The primary reason for this change was the company's foray into hydro and nuclear based power generation along with backward integration of coal mining. In 2006, it entered into an agreement with the Government of Sri Lanka to set up two units of 250 MW each in Trincomalee in Sri Lanka. During 2008 and 2011, NTPC entered into joint ventures with BHEL, Bharat Forge, NHPC, Coal India, SAIL, NMDC, and NPCIL to expand its business of power generation. By the end of 2010, its installed capacity crossed 31,000 MW.

The company in 2009 joined forces with other state enterprises Rashtriya Ispat Nigam, Steel Authority of India, Coal India, and National Minerals Development Corporation to invest in coal mining operations through a joint venture vehicle named International Coal Ventures Private Limited (ICVL). In July 2014, ICVL acquired a 65 percent stake in the Benga coal mine in Mozambique from the Rio Tinto Group. In December 2022, the market capitalisation of NTPC limited was ₹1,66,249.34 crore. NTPC limited has engaged PR Professionals (PRP Group) as its Public Relations firm since the beginning of 2026. The PR Firm ever since has been highlighting the work NTPC has been doing in achieving India's energy transition goals.

== Organisational Structure ==
NTPC operates from 70 locations in India, one location in Sri Lanka and two locations in Bangladesh. In India, it has eight regional headquarters (HQ):

Sr. No.	Headquarters	City
1	NCRHQ	New Delhi
2	WR-I HQ	Mumbai
3	WR-II HQ	Raipur
4	SRHQ	Secunderabad
5	ER-I HQ	Patna
6	ER-II HQ	Bhubaneshwar
7	NRHQ	Lucknow
8	Hydro HQ	Delhi

Board of Directors of the NTPC
Sr. No.	Name	Designation
1	Shri Gurdeep Singh	Chairman & Managing Director
2	Shri Jaikumar Srinivasan	Director (Finance)
3	Shri Shivam Srivastava	Director (Fuel)
4	Shri K. Shanmugha Sundaram	Director (Projects)
5	Shri Ravindra Kumar	Director (Operations)
6	Shri Anil Kumar Jadli	Director (HR)
7	Shri Piyush Singh	AS (Thermal)
8	Shri Mahabir Prasad	Joint Secretary & Financial Advisor, MoP
9	Dr. Anil Kumar Gupta	Independent Director
10	CA Pankaj Gupta	Independent Director
11	Dr. K. Ghayathri Devi	Independent Director
12	Shri Sushil Kumar Choudhary	Independent Director
13	Prof. (Dr.) Som Nath Sachdeva	Independent Director

NTPC Officers' Ranks and Basic Pay
Level	Basic Pay (₹/month)	Rank in NTPC	Description	Equivalent Rank in the Government of India
-	₹200,000 (US$2,100)—₹370,000 (US$3,800)	Chairman & Managing Director	Head of the NTPC	Secretary
-	₹180,000 (US$1,900)—₹340,000 (US$3,500)	Board of Directors	Highest governance and decision-making body, shaping enterprise-wide strategies, long-term investments	Special Secretary
E9	₹150,000 (US$1,600)—₹300,000 (US$3,100)	Executive Director	Commands a region, major mega-station, or vital corporate vertical	Additional Secretary
E8	₹120,000 (US$1,200)—₹280,000 (US$2,900)	General Manager (GM)	Holds ultimate accountability for large-scale power operations and profit centers, and shapes strategic enterprise policies to drive long-term business growth and national energy goals.	Additional Secretary
E7	₹100,000 (US$1,000)—₹260,000 (US$2,700)	Deputy General Manager (DGM)	Directs a major plant division or corporate department, shapes strategic long-term policies, manages high-level budgets	Joint Secretary
E6	₹90,000 (US$930)—₹240,000 (US$2,500)	Senior Manager	Oversees multiple operational or engineering units, drives high-level strategic initiatives	Joint Secretary
E5	₹80,000 (US$830)—₹220,000 (US$2,300)	Manager	Entry to the senior management role, heads a major department or operational unit	Director
E4	₹70,000 (US$730)—₹200,000 (US$2,100)	Deputy Manager	Leads larger technical teams, manages critical plant maintenance and operational budgets	Deputy Secretary
E3	₹60,000 (US$620)—₹180,000 (US$1,900)	Assistant Manager	Oversees daily power plant operations	Under Secretary
E2	₹50,000 (US$520)—₹160,000 (US$1,700)	Senior Engineer	Supervise daily maintenance and shift operations, lead frontline technical teams, and ensure strict safety compliance	Assistant Secretary; Group A
E1	₹40,000 (US$420)—₹140,000 (US$1,500)	Executive Engineer Trainee	Engineering executive trainees (EETs) are recruited through the GATE examination at this level	Section Officer; Group B
E0	₹30,000 (US$310)—₹120,000 (US$1,200)	Assistant Officer	Routine on-site engineering tasks, laboratory testing, or administrative duties under senior executive guidance.	Assistant Section Officer; Group B
W0-WSG	₹20,000 (US$210)—₹29,000 (US$300)	Worksmen/ Non-Executive	Operate, maintain, and support plant machinery and administration to ensure steady power generation	UDC/LDC/MTS; Group C

Note: Apart from the Basic Pay, all officials of the NTPC receive accommodation in Company quarter, other perks & allowances up to 35% of Basic Pay, Industrial Dearness Allowance (IDA), Night Shift Allowance, Petrol/Conveyance Allowance, Field Compensatory Allowance (incase of posting in Northeast India or Jammu & Kashmir and Ladakh), Foreign Deputation Allowance (incase of Posting in Bangladesh or Sri Lanka), Leave as per Rule, Medical Treatment/ Airlift by helicopter during medical emergency/ reimbursement of every medical treatments and medicine, Subsidized Canteen facilities, Self Contributory Superannuation Benefit Fund, Provident Fund, Annual allowances like Performance Related Payment, Uniform & Dress Allowance, Festival Advance / Bonus, Laptop Allowance, Mobile Allowance, Briefcase Allowance, Furniture Allowance and Book Allowance, are also admissible as per Company's Rules.

=== Scheduling and generation dispatch ===
The scheduling and dispatch of all the generating stations owned by National Thermal Power Corporation are done by respective regional load dispatch centers, which are the apex body to ensure integrated operation of the power system grid in the respective region. All these load dispatch centers come under Power System Operation Corporation Limited (POSOCO).

== Subsidiaries ==
1. Convergence Energy Services Limited
2. Energy Efficiency Services Limited
3. Green Valley Renewable Energy Limited (GVREL)
4. NTPC Mining Limited
5. NTPC Green Energy
6. NTPC Renewables Limited
7. National High Power Test Laboratory Private Limited (NHPTL)
8. NEEPCO
9. THDC India Limited
10. Tusco Ltd.

== Joint ventures ==
1. Aravali Power Company Pvt. Ltd.

== Capacity of plants ==
The total installed capacity of the company is 72,304 MW (including 13,465 MW through JVs/subsidiaries) across the country, (26 Coal based stations, seven gas based stations, one hydro station, one small hydro, 11 solar PV, and one wind based station) and 25 joint venture stations (nine coal based, four gas based, eight hydro-powered, one small hydro, two wind-powered, and one solar PV).

=== Thermal power ===
==== Coal-based power plants (own operational) ====
Sr. No.	Project	State	Capacity in MW	Units in MW	Status
1	Singrauli Super Thermal Power Station	Uttar Pradesh	2,000	5×200, 2×500	All units functional,2×800 MW unit under construction.
2	NTPC Korba	Chhattisgarh	2,600	3×200, 4×500	All units functional
3	NTPC Ramagundam	Telangana	2,600	3×200, 4×500	All units functional.
4.	Farakka Super Thermal Power Station	West Bengal	2,100	3×200, 3×500	All units functional
5	Vindhyachal Super Thermal Power Station	Madhya Pradesh	4,783	6×210, 7×500, 2×4, 1×15	All units functional. Largest Thermal Power Station in India. A small hydro of 8 MW and a PV Solar power station of 15 MW is also present.
6	Rihand Thermal Power Station	Uttar Pradesh	3,000	6×500	All units functional
7	Kahalgaon Super Thermal Power Station	Bihar	2,340	4×210, 3×500	All units functional
8	NTPC Dadri	Uttar Pradesh	1,820	4×210, 2×490	All units functional
9	Talcher Super Thermal Power Station	Odisha	3,010	6×500, 1×10	All units functional
10	Feroze Gandhi Unchahar Thermal Power Station	Uttar Pradesh	1,550	5×210, 1×500	All units functional
11	Talcher Thermal Power Station	Odisha	460	2×110, 4×60	All units retired and shut down, will be replaced by 2×660 MW Unit
12	Simhadri Super Thermal Power Station	Andhra Pradesh	2,000	4×500	All units functional
13	NTPC Tanda	Uttar Pradesh	1,760	4×110, 2×660	All units functional
14	Sipat Thermal Power Station	Chhattisgarh	2,980	2×500, 3×660	All units functional
15	Mauda Super Thermal Power Station	Maharashtra	2,320	2×500, 2×660	All units functional
16	Barh Super Thermal Power Station	Bihar	3,300	3×660, 2×660	All units functional
17	Kudgi Super Thermal Power Station	Karnataka	2,400	3×800	All units functional
18	NTPC Bongaigaon	Assam	750	3×250	All units functional
19	LARA Super Thermal Power Station	Chhattisgarh	1600	2×800, 2×800	2×800 MW unit functional, 2×800 MW unit under construction.
20	Solapur Super Thermal Power Station	Maharashtra	1,320	2×660	All units functional.
21	Gadarwara Super Thermal Power Station	Madhya Pradesh	1,600	2×800, 2×800	2×800 MW unit functional, 2×800 MW unit under construction
22	North Karanpura Thermal Power Station	Jharkhand	1,980	3×660	2 units functional, 1 under construction
23	Darlipali Super Thermal Power Station	Odisha	1,600	2×800	2×800 MW unit functional, 1×800 MW unit under construction.
24	Khargone Super Thermal Power Station	Madhya Pradesh	1,320	2×660	All unit functional.
25	Telangana Super Thermal Power Project	Telangana	1,600	2×800	all units functional
26	Barauni Thermal Power Station	Bihar	720	2×110, 2×250	Stage 1 2×110 MW retired 2*250 functional

==== Coal-based (JV/subsidiary) ====
Sr. No.	Name of the JV	Location	State	Capacity in MW
1	NSPCL. Joint venture with SAIL.	Durgapur	West Bengal	160
2	NSPCL. Joint venture with SAIL.	Rourkela	Odisha	370
3	NSPCL. Joint venture with SAIL.	Bhilai	Chhattisgarh	574
4	NPGC. Wholly owned subsidiary of NTPC.	Aurangabad	Bihar	1980
5	Muzaffarpur Thermal Power Station (MTPS). Wholly owned subsidiary of NTPC.	Kanti	Bihar	610
6	BRBCL. Joint venture with Indian Railways.	Nabinagar	Bihar	1000
7	Aravali Power CPL JV with HPGCL & IPGCL	Jhajjar	Haryana	1500
8	NTECL JV with NTPC & TNEB	Chennai	Tamil Nadu	1500
9	Meja Thermal Power Station JV with NTPC & UPRVUNL	Prayagraj	Uttar Pradesh	1320 3*800 mw planned at meja, 2*800mw planned at obra, 2*800mw planned at anpara under MVUNL
10	PUVNL (Patratu) joint venture with Jharkhand State Electricity Board.	Patratu	Jharkhand	4000
11	Khurja-THDC	Bulandshahr	Uttar Pradesh	1320

==== Gas-based power plants (own operational) ====
Sr.No.	Power project	State	Capacity MW	Unit Size MW	Status
1	Anta	Rajasthan	419.33	3×88, 1×149	All unit running
2	Auraiya	Uttar Pradesh	663.36	4×110, 2×106	All unit running
3	Kawas	Gujarat	656.20	2×110.5, 4×106	All unit running
4	Dadri	Uttar Pradesh	829.78	4×130.19,2×154.51	All unit running
5	Jhanor-Gandhar	Gujarat	657.39	3×131, 1×155	All unit running
6	Kayamkulam, Haripad	Kerala	359.58	2×115.2 + 1×129.177	All unit running
7	Faridabad	Haryana	431.59	2×143, 1×144	All unit running

==== Gas-based (JV/subsidiary) ====
Sr.No.	Power project	State	Capacity MW
1	Ratnagiri Gas and Power Private Limited (RGPPL)	Maharashtra	1967
2	Assam Gas based power plant	Assam	291
3	Agartala GT CCPP	Tripura	135
4	Tripura Gas based CCPP	Tripura	101

=== Hydro power ===
The company has also stepped up its hydroelectric power (hydel) project implementation. Some of these projects are:

==== Hydro-electric power plants (own operational) ====
Sr.No.	Power project	State	Capacity MW	Unit in MW	Status
1	Koldam Dam	Himachal Pradesh	800	4×200 MW	All four units commissioned
2	Tapovan Vishnugad	Uttarakhand	520	4×130 MW	Under construction
3	Lata Tapovan	Uttarakhand	171	3 × 57 MW	Under construction
4	Rammam Hydro	West Bengal	120	3 × 40 MW	Under construction

==== Hydro-electric power plants (JV/Subsidiary) ====
Sr.No.	Project	State/UT	Capacity MW
1	Tehri HPP (THDC)	Uttarakhand	1000
2	Tehri PSP (THDC)	Uttarakhand	1000
3	Koteshwar HPP (THDC)	Uttarakhand	400
4	Vishnugad Pipalkoti HEP(THDC)	Uttarakhand	444
5	Ranganadi HEP (NEEPCO)	Arunachal	405
6	Doyang HEP (NEEPCO)	Nagaland	75
7	Pare HEP (NEEPCO)	Arunachal	110
8	Tuirial HEP (NEEPCO)	Mizoram	60
9	Kopili HEP (NEEPCO)	Assam	275
10	Kameng HEP (NEEPCO)	Arunachal	600

=== Renewable energy ===
NTPC's current renewable power plants in solar and wind include:

==== Solar photovoltaic power plants (own operational) ====
Sr.No.	Project	State/UT	Capacity
1	Dadri Solar PV	Uttar Pradesh	05 MW
2	Port Blair Solar PV	Andaman & Nicobar Island	05 MW
3	Ramagundam Solar PV	Telangana	110 MW
4	Talcher Kaniha	Odisha	10 MW
5	Faridabad Solar PV	Haryana	05 MW
6	Unchahar Solar PV	Uttar Pradesh	10 MW
7	Rajgarh Solar PV	Madhya Pradesh	50 MW
8	Singrauli Solar PV	Uttar Pradesh	15 MW
9	Ananthpuram Solar PV	Andhra Pradesh	250 MW
10	Bhadla-Solar PV	Rajasthan	260 MW
11	Mandsaur Solar PV	Madhya Pradesh	250 MW
12	Bishrampur Solar PV	Chhattisgarh	20 MW
13	Bhatgaon Solar PV	Chhattisgarh	20 MW
14	Fatehgarh Solar PV	Rajasthan	296 MW
15	Simhadri Floating Solar	Andhra Pradesh	25 MW
16	NTPC Haripad Floating Solar Power Plant	Kerala	92 MW
	Total		1443 MW

==== Solar photovoltaic power plants (JV/subsidiary) ====
Sr.No.	Project	State/UT	Capacity
1	Solar TGBPP Tripura (NEEPCO)	Tripura	05 MW

==== Wind Power (own operational) ====
Sr.No.	Project	State/UT	Capacity
1	Rojmal	Gujarat	50 MW

==== Wind Power (JV/subsidiary) ====
Sr.No.	Project	State/UT	Capacity
1	Patan Wind Power Project (THDC)	Gujarat	50 MW
2	Devbhumi Dwarka Wind Power Project (THDC)	Gujarat	63 MW

==== Small hydro ====
- Singrauli CW Discharge (small hydro) 8 (4×2) MW is on the discharge canal of the Singrauli Super Thermal Power Station in Uttar Pradesh. All units of this project are under commercial operation.
- NTPC-THDC has installed 24(8×3) MW Small Hydro Project at Dhukwan on Betwa river in Jhansi district of Uttar Pradesh.

== Future goals ==
The company has developed a long-term plan to become a 1,28,000 MW company by 2032. NTPC Limited is on an expansion spree to meet the power requirements of the country—the company has targeted to add 14,058 MW in 12th Plan (from FY13 to FY 17) of which it had already added 4,170 MW in 2012–2013, 1835 MW in 2013–2014, 1290 MW in 2014–2015, and 1150 MW from April–30 November 2015.

As of 30 November 2015, the company has 23,004 MW under construction. NTPC is diversifying its capacity mix with much emphasis on renewable energy. As on 30 November 2015, NTPC has 110 MW Solar PV capacity under operation, 250 MW under construction, and 1260 MW under tendering. The company intends to add 10,000 MW of Solar PV capacity in the next five years. On 18 July 2015, NTPC declared commercial its first Hydro Power plant at Koldam in the state of Himachal Pradesh. The company has a long-term plan to reduce its fossil fuel capacity mix to 56% by 2032.

NTPC also plans to go global. The public sector company has signed a memorandum of agreement (MoU) with the Government of Sri Lanka and Ceylon Electricity Board for setting up a 500 MW (2×250) coal-based thermal power plant in the island nation. An MoU has also been signed with Kyushu Electric Power Co. Inc., Japan, for establishing an alliance for exchange of information and experts from different areas of the business. The company is also in the process of finalising an MoU with Nigeria for setting up power plants against the allocation of LNG on a long-term basis for NTPC plants in India. NTPC is also developing a joint-venture coal-based power plant 1,320 MW (2×660) with the Bangladesh Power Development Board known as Bangladesh India Friendship Power Company in Ramp Bangladesh, which is facing tremendous opposition from the people of Bangladesh owing to the plant's dangerously close proximity to the Sundarbans.

NTPC has also been allotted coal blocks, namely Pakri Barwadih, Chatti Bariatu, and Kerandari in Jharkhand as well as Talipalli, Chhattisgarh, and Dulanga in Odisha. Except for Pakri Barwadih, all other blocks were canceled by a decision of the Supreme Court of India on 24 September 2014. However, the company was again allotted canceled block under Section 5 of Coal Mines (Special Provision Act 2015) Besides these blocks, the Ministry of Coal has according to its press release dated 3 July 2013 allotted four more blocks namely, Banai and Bhalmuda in Chhattisgarh, Chandrabila and Kudanli Laburi in Odisha. Two more blocks namely Mandakini-II and Banhardih are expected to be allotted to NTPC soon. All these mines are having estimated geological reserves of 6.7 billion tonnes. NTPC has appointed Mining Cum Development Operator (MDO) for its Pakri Barwadih mine.

== Listings and shareholding ==
The equity shares of NTPC are listed on the Bombay Stock Exchange, where it is a constituent of the BSE SENSEX index, and the National Stock Exchange of India, where it is a constituent of the Nifty 50.

In September 2015, the Government of India held around 74.96% equity shares in NTPC. Over 6,80,000 individual shareholders hold approx. 1.92% of its shares. Life Insurance Corporation of India is the largest non-promoter shareholder in the company with 10.03% shareholding.

In August 2017, the GoI divested further its 5% stake in NTPC through OFS (Stock Exchange Mechanism) and reduced the holding of GOI in NTPC to 5,76,83,41,760 shares i.e. 64.96% out of total 8,24,54,64,400 shares.

The balance is held by public, FIIs, Mutual Funds, and Banks.

Shareholders	Shareholding
Promoters: Government of India	51.10%
DII	18.20%
Foreign Institutional Investors	14.54%
Body Corporate & Insurance Companies	12.88%
Individuals/HUFs	2.20%
Others	1.08%
Total	100.0%

== Employees ==
As of 31 March 2015, the company had 24,067 employees. The attrition rate for the FY 2014–2015, including the trainee employees and employees working for subsidiaries and JVs, was 1.35%. Man MW Ratio of the company has fallen from 0.77 in the FY11 to 0.61 in FY 15. NTPC has been awarded continuously as great places to work for in PSUs category.

NTPC was ranked second among the 250 largest power producer energy traders in the world by Platts in 2015. On overall basis NTPC ranked 56th amongst Platts 250 companies. In 2009, it received ICSI National Award for Excellence in Corporate Governance.

== Criticism ==
=== Land acquisition in tribal areas ===
The company (and other PSUs in India) has been allotted land for setting power plants and related infrastructure in rural or tribal areas across the country by Central Government and various state governments. Some of these lands have been allotted to NTPC (and other PSUs in India) through Land Acquisition Acts passed by Central and State Governments. Wherever a land acquisition law is enacted, it also places a liability on the PSUs or governments to take actions for proper rehabilitation of displaced residents of that rural or tribal area. Governments or PSUs are criticised if they do not fulfill their liability towards displaced residents. In many areas where land acquisition is proposed through land acquisition laws, local residents oppose the forcible acquisition, as they are not sure of proper rehabilitation.

=== Future growth ===
Draft National Electricity Plan (2016), prepared by GoI, states that India does not need additional coal-fired power plants until 2027 with the commissioning of various coal-based power plants which are presently under construction. India is not facing regular power shortages to purchase electricity at high prices, offering higher profit margins to the competing power generating companies. With the help of assured power purchase agreements (PPA) from the state-owned DisComs, NTPC was able to sell its power at higher margins on the deployed capital and higher overhead costs. Moreover, its main expertise of generating power from coal-fired stations is becoming obsolete in terms of technology and economics against non-conventional power generation like wind, solar, etc. In the future, for the satisfactory growth mainly from wind and solar power projects, NTPC is ready to slash all its extra profit margins on capital deployed to bring down the power sale price at par with the IPPs to secure the projects in open competitive bidding.

Government has decided to scrap the coal-fired power stations which are more than 25 years old to reduce the pollution. Instead of scrapping old pulverised coal-fired units, NTPC should replace coal with torrefied crops waste/biomass as fuel in these units (nearly 11,000 MW) to make them profitable and productive assets without contributing to pollution.

To utilise its proven O&M expertise, NTPC may venture on a major scale to implement the solar thermal storage power as they can offer clean and cheaper electricity than fossil fuel-fired power generation plants.

Rather than install emissions-cutting technologies, NTPC has chosen to lobby the government to extend pollution reduction deadlines.

=== Controversies with projects ===
Loharinag Pala Hydro Power Project by NTPC Ltd: Loharinag Pala Hydro Power Project (600 MW i.e. 150 MW × 4 units) is located on the river Bhagirathi (a tributary of the Ganges) in Uttarkashi district of Uttarakhand state. This is the first project downstream from the origin of the Ganges at Gangotri. The project was at the advanced stage of construction when it was discontinued by the Government of India in August 2010.

Rupasiyabagar Khasiabara HPP, 261 MW in Pithoragarh, Uttarakhand State, near China Border, is yet to be given investment approval..

Badarpur Thermal Power Station has been permanently closed due to pollution issues in Delhi NCR. The total installed capacity of all of its units was 705 MW, which has been retired and fully closed since 15 October 2018.

== See also ==
- Electricity in India
- Energy in India
- List of companies of India
- List of public sector undertakings in India
- 2017 NTPC power plant explosion
