= Shaktinagar, Uttar Pradesh =

Town in Sonbhadra, Uttar Pradesh, India

Shaktinagar
- Town
- Location in Uttar Pradesh, India Shaktinagar (India)
- Coordinates: 24.121884°N 82.694816°E
- Country: India
- State: Uttar Pradesh
- District: Sonbhadra

Population (2001)
  - Total: 18,983

Languages
  - Official: Hindi
- Time zone: UTC+5:30 (IST)
- Postal code: 231222
- Telephone code: 05446
- Website: up.gov.in

Shaktinagar is a small town in Sonbhadra, Mirzapur Division, Uttar Pradesh near Varanasi, India. The city borders with Madhya Pradesh at Jayant Border.

== About ==
Some of the famous places in the town are Chilka Lake Park, Helipad, Jwaladevi Temple, Shiv Mandir, Sunday Market (vegetable market opening only on Sundays), Sangam Shopping Complex and the Jawahar Lal Nehru Stadium. The town is also well connected with road services from Varanasi (206 km) And Robertsganj (115 km). Nearest Railway stations are Shaktinagar (3 km), Singrauli (20 km), Anpara (25 km) and Krishnashila (13 km).

Places to visit nearby are Vendam fall (110 km), Gopat, Manda stream, Manda caves (60 km), Vindhyanagar Park, Mini Goa (Renukut 40 kms.) shopping center at Waidhan and Nawanagar, helipad park etc.

== Industries ==
Nearby industries are NTPC Singrauli (First NTPC power plant of India), NTPC Vindhyachal, NTPC Rihand, Renusagar, Essar Energy, Reliance Power, Hindalco (Aditya Birla Group), Northern Coalfields, which provides coal to NTPC plants to generate electricity and supply it to Northern as well as the NCR region.

== Education ==
Schools in the town include St. Joseph School, which was established in 1978, Vivekanand Senior Secondary School, Kendriya Vidyalaya (Central School), a Group of DAV School nearly in every project of Singrauli Coalfield also known as Northern Coalfields Limited like DAV Bina, DAV Khadia, DAV Jayant, DAV Nigahi, DAV Jhingurdah, Christ Jyoti School, Delhi Public School (D.P.S), and many more.

== Connectivity ==
Shaktinagar Railway Station is fully connected by road to various cities through NH 39 ( Former NH 75), SH 5A and is also connected directly via Trains like: Triveni Express (Tanakpur To Shaktinagar), Singrauli - Varanasi Intercity (Singrauli to Varanasi), Singrauli - Jabalpur Intercity (Singrauli to Jabalpur) and Shaktinagar Passenger (Shaktinagar to Chopan), Shaktipunj Express (Jabalpur Junction railway station to Howrah railway station), Singrauli - New Delhi Express(Weekly)
