= Pare Hydro Electric Project =

Hydroelectric power station in India

The Pare Hydro Electric Project is a NTPC NEEPCO situated in the Dikrong River which is a tributary of Brahmaputra River in the Papum Pare District of Arunachal Pradesh.Total installed capacity of project is 110 MW

The project was constructed by four contractors:

- Hindustan Construction Company Ltd. - Civil Works
- Precision Infratech - Hydro-Mechanical Works
- Andritz Hydro - Electro-Mechanical Works
- Alstom T&D India Ltd (Alstom Group) - Transformer & Switchyard
