= Tripura Gas based CCPP =

Combined power plant in India

Tripura Gas based Combined Cycle project joint venture of NTPC and NEEPCO is located in the Sepahijala District of the state of Tripura, India around 60 km away from the capital town of Agartala. Capacity of this power plant is 101 MW (1 X 65.42) Gas Turbine & (1 X 35.58) Steam Turbine. Generation began in 2015.
