= NSPCL Bhilai Power Plant =

Coal-fired captive power station in India

Coordinates: 21°11′09″N 81°25′22″E

The NSPCL Bhilai Power Plant is a coal-fired captive power station at Bhilai in Durg district, Chhattisgarh, India. The power station owned and operated by NSPCL is a 50:50 joint venture company of NTPC Limited and SAIL to generate power for captive purposes of various steel plants owned by SAIL.

== Capacity ==
The project comprises two power plants named Bhilai Captive Power Plant a 74 MW (2x30 MW and 1x14 MW) and a new Bhilai Expansion Power Project a 500 MW (2x250 MW) The power left available after captive purposes is provided to other users in the Western region.

Unit Number	Capacity (MW)	Status
1	14	Running
2	30	Running
3	30	Running
4	250	Running since 2008-2009
5	250	Running since 2008-2009
