= Assam Gas based power plant =

Thermal power plant in India

Coordinates: 27.34099524°N 95.40638428°E

Assam Gas Based Power Plant
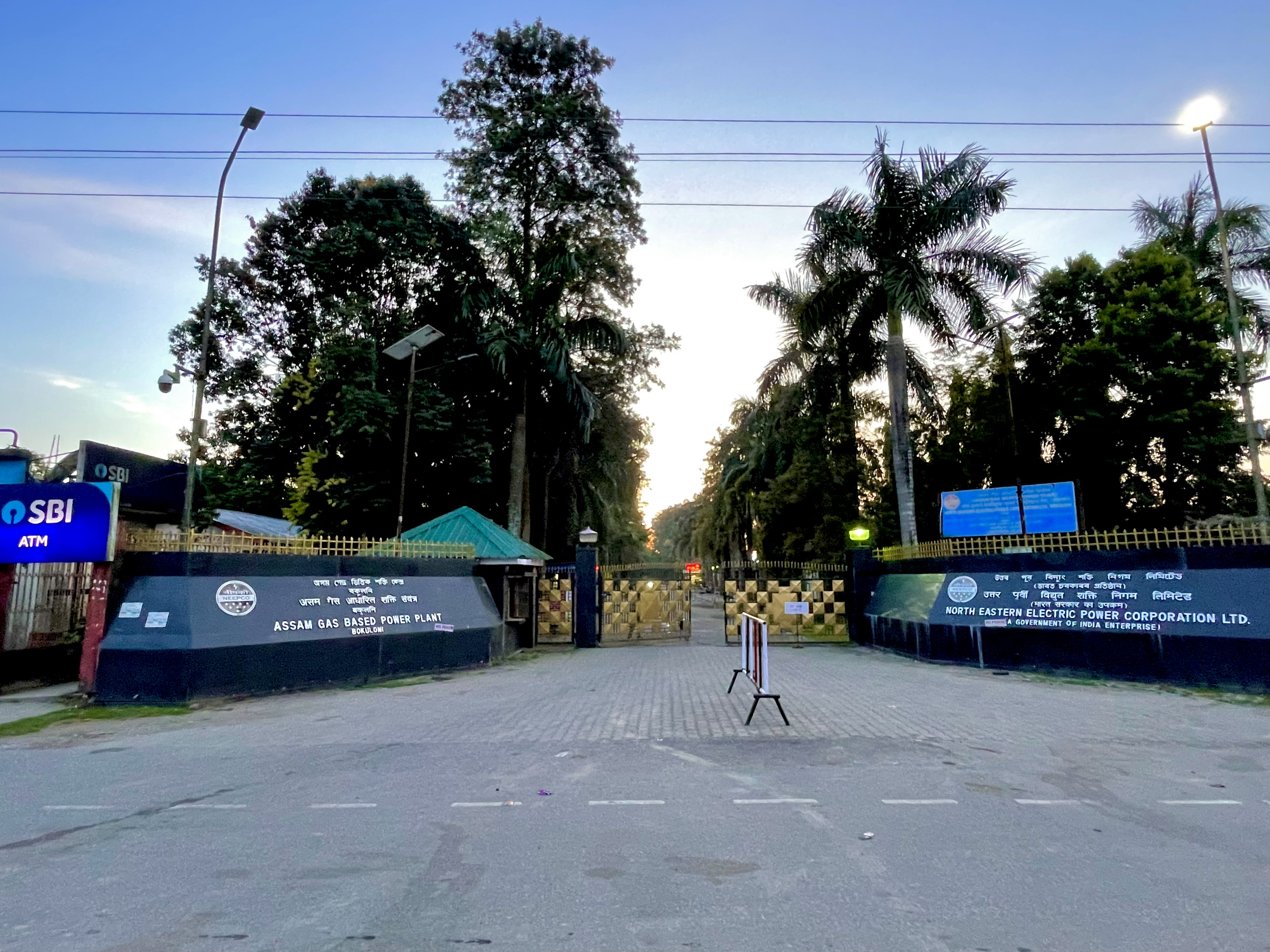
- Entrance of Assam Gas Based Power Plant
- Country: India
- Location: Bakuloni, Duliajan, Assam
- Status: Operational
- Commission date: 1995; 30 years ago
- Owner: Government of India
- Operator: North Eastern Electric Power Corporation Limited

Thermal power station
- Primary fuel: Natural gas
- Combined cycle?: Yes

Power generation
- Nameplate capacity: 291 MW

Assam Gas based power plant is a combined cycle gas turbine project joint venture of NTPC and NEEPCO, located in the Dibrugarh District of Assam, India. The capacity of this power plant is 291 MW (6 X 33.50) gas turbines (3 X 30.00) steam turbines.
