= NTPC Dadri Solar Power Plant =

Photovoltaic power station in Dadri, India

- Country: India
- Location: Dadri, Uttar Pradesh, India
- Coordinates: 28.579202°N 77.631433°E
- Construction began: 2012
- Commission date: 2013
- Operator: National Thermal Power Corporation

Solar farm
- Type: Flat-panel PV
- Site area: 27 acres

Power generation
- Nameplate capacity: 5 MW

NTPC Dadri Solar Power Plant is a photovoltaic power station of NTPC Limited in Dadri, India.

== History ==
The 5 MW power plant is the first solar project of NTPC Limited, which was commissioned in 2013 on 27 acres of land at the NTPC Dadri Thermal Power Station. The whole project was executed for about ₹48.59 crore by Wipro Limited. Before the commissioning of the plant, Grid Corporation of Orissa Limited (GRIDCO) signed a power purchase agreement with NTPC to supply power through the Inter State Transmission System (ISTS).
