= Agartala GT CCPP =

Joint venture between the NTPC and NEEPCO

The Agartala Combined Cycle Power Plant 135 MW (4 x 21 MW + 2 x 25.5 MW) is a joint venture between the NTPC and NEEPCO which was completed in 1997–98. It is located in the West Tripura District of the state of Tripura near the capital town of Agartala, India.
