= Rammam =

Rammam may refer to:

- Rammam Hydro, hydroelectric plant in India
- Ramim-e Shomali, village in Iran
- Rammam River, river in Darjeeling district, India
