= Tuirial Hydro Electric Project =

Diyorbek Nomozov

Tuirial Hydro Electric Project is NTPC NEEPCO owned project situated on Tuirial river system and is located in the Aizawl district of Mizoram adjoining Cachar district of Assam. Total installed capacity of project is 60(2 x 30) MW.
