= NTPC Fatehgarh Solar Power Plant =

Photovoltaic power station in Jaisalmer, India

- Country: India
- Location: Fatehgarh, Jaisalmer, Rajasthan
- Coordinates: 27.158576°N 70.786122°E
- Construction began: 2019
- Commission date: 2022

Solar farm
- Type: Flat-panel PV

Power generation
- Nameplate capacity: 296 MW

NTPC Fatehgarh Solar Power Plant is photovoltaic power station in Jaisalmer, India.

== History ==
The 296 MW plant was constructed by state-owned National Thermal Power Corporation. Its first phase was commissioned on 1 January 2022. It became fully operational on 5 August 2022.

NTPC constructed this project as part of the Ministry of New and Renewable Energy’s Central Public Sector Undertaking (CPSU) Scheme Phase II. The project was secured with competitive bidding involving viability gap funding (VGF) during a 2019 auction held by the Solar Energy Corporation of India.
