= THDC India Limited =

Hydro-electric power company

- Type: Subsidiary of National Thermal Power Corporation
- Industry: Hydro-electric Power
- Founded: 12 July 1988
- Headquarters: Rishikesh, Uttarakhand, India
- Key people: Sipan Kumar Garg (Chairman & MD)
- Products: Electricity Power Generation
- Owner: National Thermal Power Corporation Limited, Ministry of Power, Government of India
- Website: www.thdc.co.in

THDC India Limited (formerly Tehri Hydro Development Corporation Limited) is owned by National Thermal Power Corporation Limited, under the Ministry of Power, Government of India. It was incorporated in July 1988 to develop, operate and maintain the Tehri hydropower complex and other hydro projects. THDC India Limited is a Mini Ratna Category-I Enterprise. The current CMD of the corporation is Sipan kumar Garg holding additional charge.

At present, the company has four power plants in operation: Tehri Dam (1000 MW), Koteshwar Dam (400 MW), a 50 MW Wind project in Patan (Gujarat) and a 63 MW Wind project in Dwarka (Gujarat). In addition, more than 10 projects are under various stages of construction. Tehri PSP (1000 MW) and Vishnugad-Pipalkoti HEP (444 MW) are in advanced stage and were expected to be commissioned by 2024.THDCIL has also ventured into thermal power generation with a 1,320 MW thermal power project near Dussehera village, close to Khurja in Bulandshahr district, Uttar Pradesh. The project is at an advanced stage and was expected to be commissioned by 2024.

THDC signed an MoU with the Government of Rajasthan to develop 10,000 MW solar parks in the state.state. THDC is also entrusted to develop 1200 MW Kalia-II and 1750 MW Demwe (Lower) HEP in the Lohit basin of Arunachal Pradesh.

== NTPC Limited takeover ==
On 21 November 2019, the Government of India approved the takeover of THDC India Limited by NTPC Limited.

== See also ==
- Uttarakhand Power Corporation Limited
