= Tehri Dam =

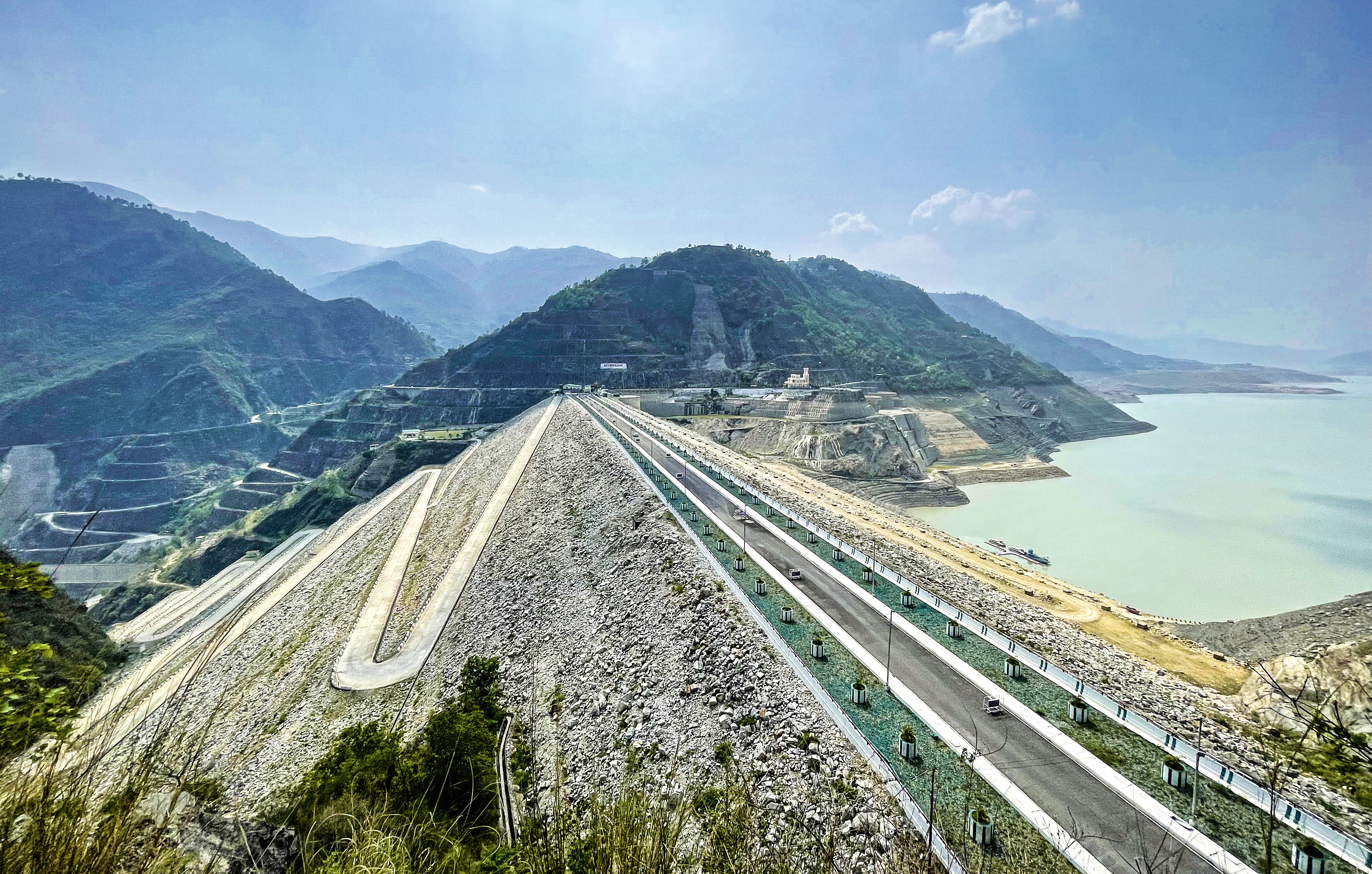
- The dam in 2008

- Location within Uttarakhand
- Country: India
- Location: New Tehri, Tehri Garhwal district, Uttarakhand, India
- Coordinates: 30°22′40″N 78°28′50″E
- Status: Operational
- Construction began: 1978
- Opening date: 2006
- Construction cost: US $2.5 billion
- Owner: THDC India Limited

Dam and spillways
- Type of dam: Embankment, earth and rock-fill
- Impounds: Bhagirathi River
- Height: 260.5 m (855 ft)
- Length: 575 m (1,886 ft)
- Width (crest): 20 m (66 ft)
- Width (base): 1,128 m (3,701 ft)
- Spillways: 2
- Spillway type: Gate controlled
- Spillway capacity: 15,540 m^{3}/s (549,000 cu ft/s)

Reservoir
- Total capacity: 3.54 km^{3} (2,870,000 acre⋅ft) (125.03 tmc ft)
- Surface area: 42 km^{2} (16 sq mi)

Power Station
- Commission date: 2006
- Type: P no
- Turbines: Francis pump turbines
- Installed capacity: 1,000 MW (1,300,000 hp); Planned: 2,400 MW
- Website www.thdc.co.in

The Tehri Dam is a multi-purpose rock and earth-fill embankment dam on the Bhagirathi River in New Tehri, Tehri Garhwal district in Uttarakhand, India. With a height of 260.5 m (855 ft), it is the tallest dam in India and the 13th-tallest dam in the world. It is the primary dam of THDC India Ltd. and the Tehri hydroelectric complex. The dam begun construction in 1978 and was completed in 2006. It withholds a reservoir for irrigation, municipal water supply and hydroelectricity. The dam's 1,000 MW variable-speed pumped-storage scheme is nearing completion.

== History ==
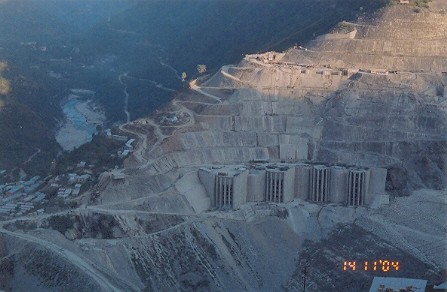
Tehri dam in November 2004

A preliminary investigation for the Tehri Dam Project was completed in 1961 under Jawahar lal Nehru's ministry, its design was completed in 1972, with a 600 MW capacity power plant based on the study. Construction began in 1978 after feasibility studies but was delayed due to financial, environmental, and social impacts.

In 1986, technical and financial assistance was provided by the USSR, but this was interrupted years later with political instability. India was forced to take control of the project and at the first, it was placed under the direction of the Irrigation Department of Uttar Pradesh. However, in 1988 the Tehri Hydro Development Corporation was formed to manage the dam and 75% of the funding would be provided by the federal government, 25% by the state. Uttar Pradesh would finance the entire irrigation portion of the project.

== Technical description ==
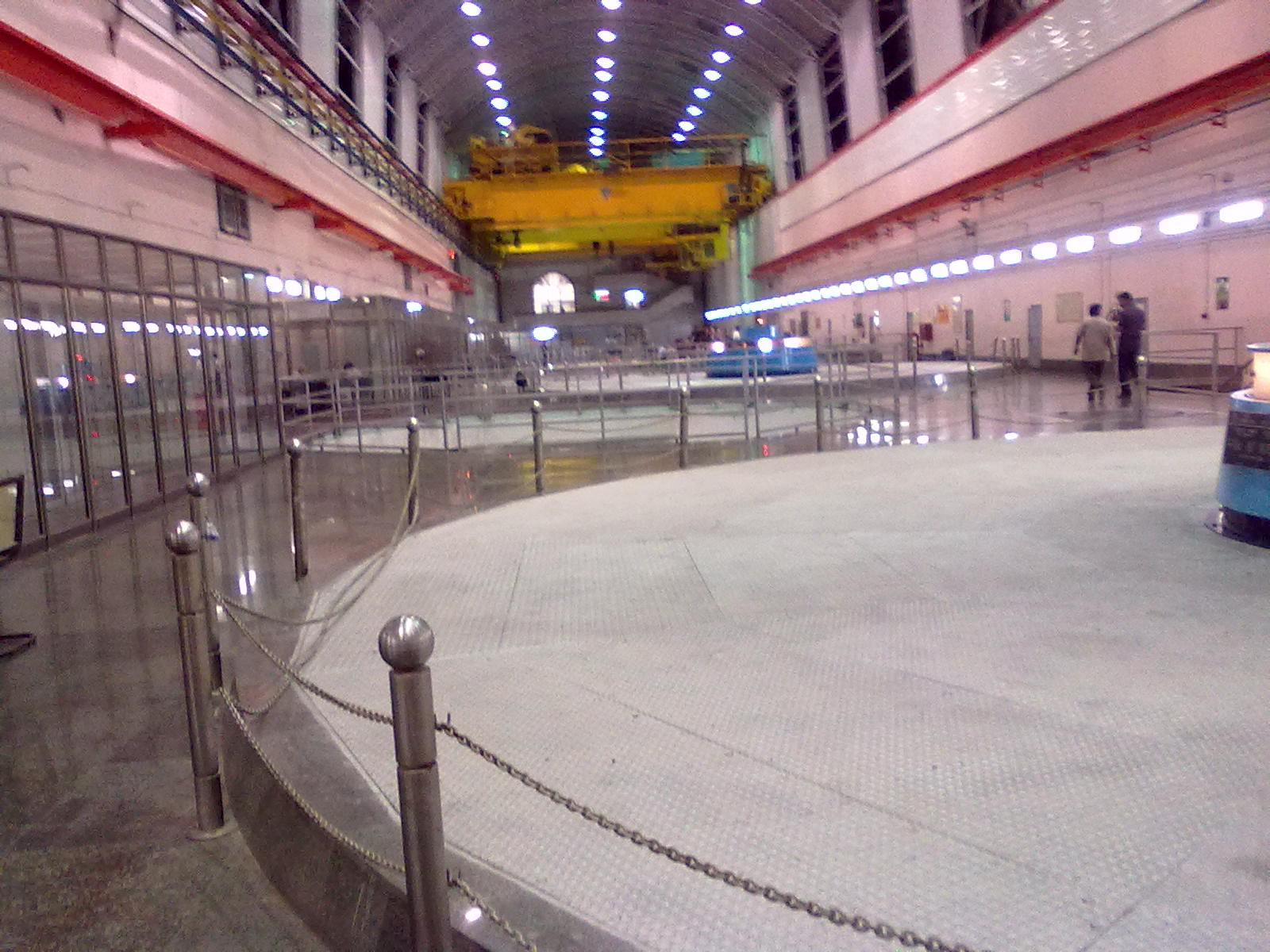
The main power house of Tehri Dam that houses four generators, each capable of producing 250 MW of power

Tehri Dam is a 260.5-metre-high (855 ft) rock and earth-fill embankment dam. Its length is 575 m (1,886 ft), crest width 20 m (66 ft), and base width 1,128 m (3,701 ft). The dam creates a reservoir of 3.54 cubic kilometres (2,870,000 acre⋅ft) with a surface area of 52 km^{2} (20 sq mi). The installed hydrocapacity is 1,000 MW along with an additional 1,000 MW of pumped storage hydroelectricity. The lower reservoir for the pumped-storage plant is created by the Koteshwar Dam downstream.

The Tehri Dam and the Tehri Pumped Storage Hydroelectric Power Plant are part of the Tehri Hydropower Complex, which also includes the 400 MW Koteshwar Dam. The Tehri pumped storage plant (4 × 250 MW) has variable-speed features that can optimize the round-trip efficiency under varying water levels in its reservoirs. Power is distributed to Uttar Pradesh, Uttarakhand, Punjab, Delhi, Haryana, Jammu and Kashmir, Chandigarh, Rajasthan and Himachal Pradesh. The complex will afford irrigation to an area of 270,000 hectares (670,000 acres), irrigation stabilization to an area of 600,000 hectares (1,500,000 acres), and a supply of 270 million imperial gallons (1.2×10^{6} m^{3}) of drinking water per day to the industrialized areas of Delhi, Uttar Pradesh and Uttarakhand.

The total expenditure for this project was US$1 billion.

=== Scheduling and generation dispatch ===
The scheduling and dispatch of the Tehri hydro power plant is done by Northern Regional Load Dispatch Center (NRLDC), which is the apex body to ensure the integrated operation of the power system grid in the Northern region and comes under Power System Operation Corporation Limited (POSOCO). At present, THDC India Ltd. is generating around 3,000 GWh annually from this dam.

== Environmental issues ==
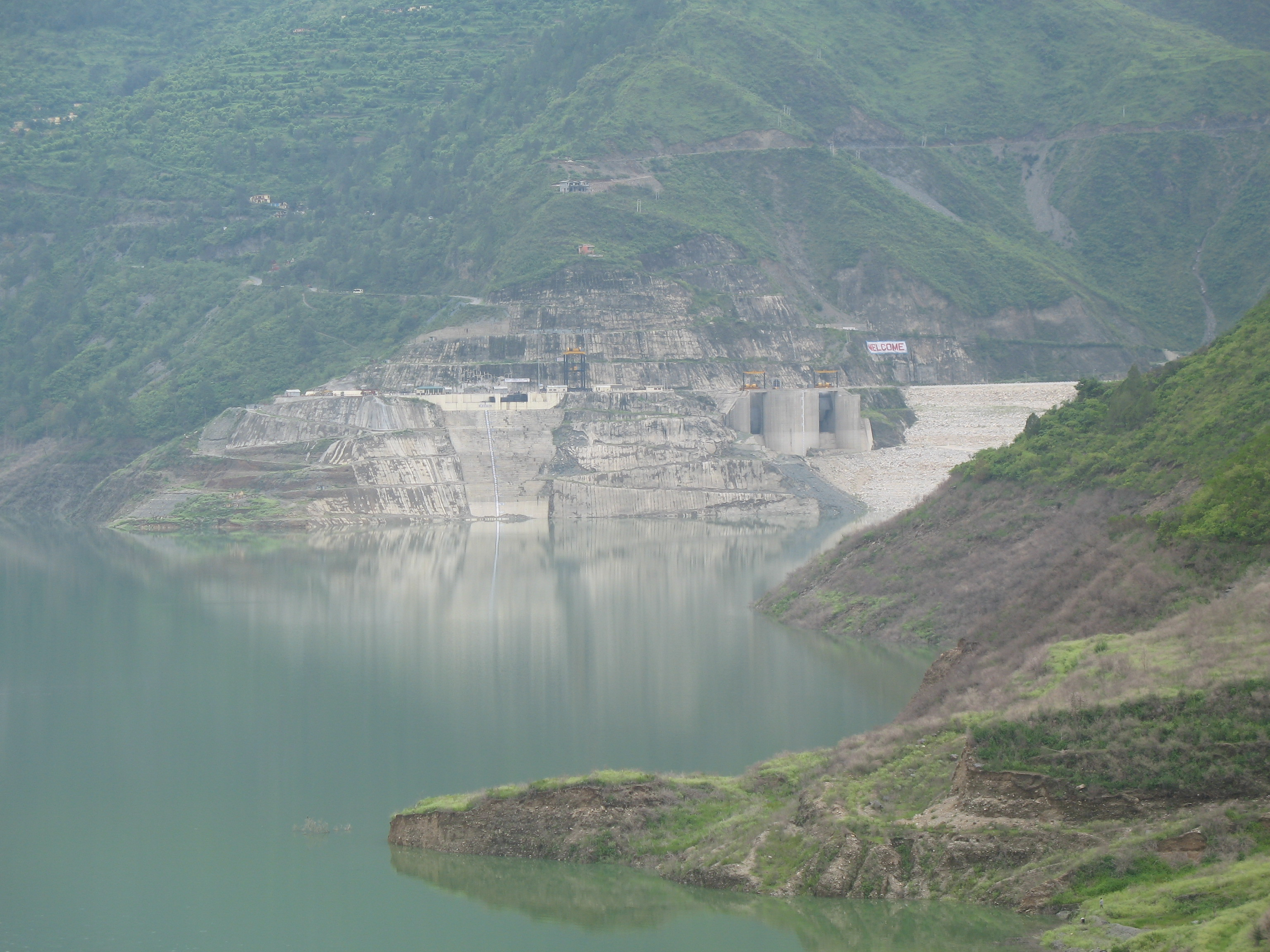
Tehri dam in July 2008

The Tehri Dam has been the object of protests by environmental organizations and local people of the region. Virendra Dutt Saklani, lawyer and founder of the Anti-Tehri Dam Struggle Committee, was quick to point out the consequences associated to the large project. Environmental activist Sunderlal Bahuguna led the Anti-Tehri Dam movement from 1980s till 2004. The protest was against the displacement of town inhabitants and environmental consequence of the weak ecosystem.

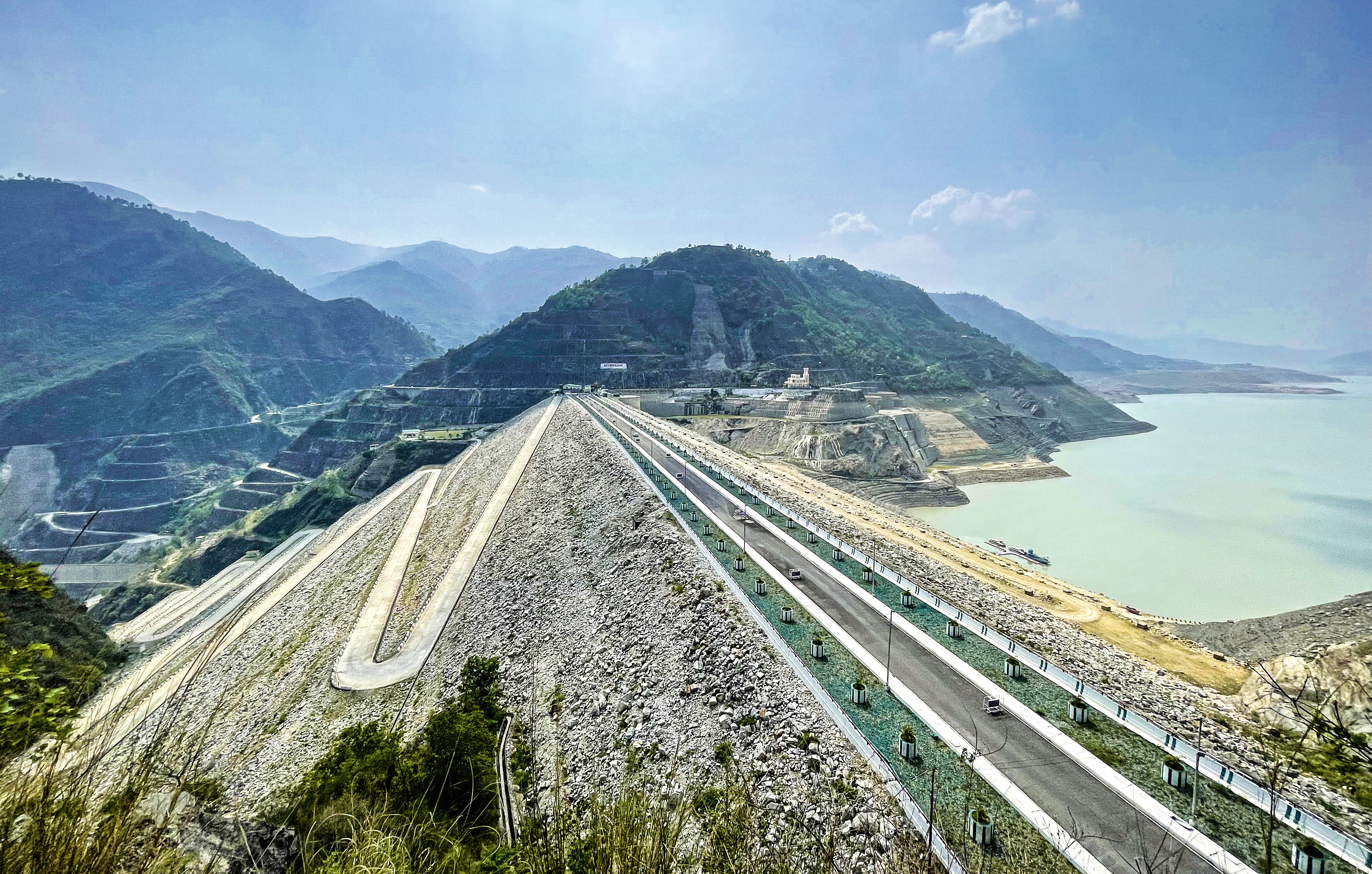
Tehri Dam is the tallest dam in India

In addition to the human rights concerns, the project has spurred concerns about the environmental consequences of locating such a large dam in the fragile ecosystem of the Himalayan foothills. There are further concerns regarding the dam's geological stability. The Tehri dam is in the Central Himalayan Seismic Gap, a major geologic fault zone. This region was the site of a 6.8 magnitude earthquake in October 1991, with an epicenter 53 km (33 mi) from the dam. Dam proponents claim that the complex is designed to withstand an earthquake of 8.4 magnitude, but some seismologists say that earthquakes with a magnitude of 8.5 or more could occur in this region. Were such a catastrophe to occur, the potentially resulting dam-break would submerge numerous towns downstream, whose populations total near half a million.

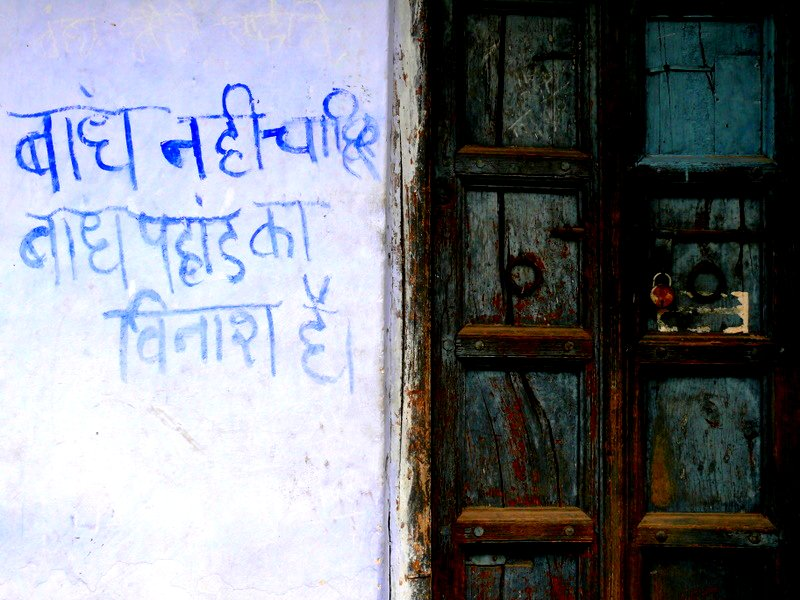
A protest message against Tehri dam, which was steered by Sundarlal Bahuguna for years. It says "We don't want the dam. The dam is the mountain's destruction."

The relocation of more than 100,000 people from the area has led to protracted legal battles over resettlement rights and, ultimately, resulted in the project's delayed completion.

Since 2005, filling of the reservoir has led to the reduced flow of Bhagirathi water from the normal 1,000 cu ft/s (28 m^{3}/s) to a mere 200 cu ft/s (5.7 m^{3}/s). This reduction has been central to local protest against the dam, since the Bhagirathi is considered part of the sacred Ganges whose waters are crucial to Hindu beliefs. At some points during the year, the tampering with Bhagirathi waters means this tributary stops flowing. This has created resentment among many Hindus, who claim that the sanctity of the Ganges has been compromised for the generation of electricity. The officials say that when the reservoir is filled to its maximum capacity the flow of the river will again become normal. In spite of concerns and protestation, operation of the Tehri Dam continues.

== NTPC Limited Takeover ==
On 21 November 2019, the Government of India approved the take over of Tehri Hydro Development Corporation (THDC) by NTPC Limited.
