= NTPC Ramagundam Floating Solar Power Plant =

Photovoltaic power station in Ramagundam, India

- Location of the NTPC Ramagundam Floating Solar Power Plant
- Country: India
- Location: Ramagundam, Telangana.
- Coordinates: 18.731712°N 79.468583°E
- Status: Operational
- Operator: National Thermal Power Corporation

Solar farm
- Type: Standard PV

Power generation
- Nameplate capacity: 100 MW

NTPC Ramagundam Floating Solar Power Plant is a floating photovoltaic power station in Ramagundam, India.

== History ==
The 100 MW plant is built on the balancing reservoir of the NTPC Ramagundam and reached full operational capacity on July 1, 2022. Spanning 500 acres and built by Bharat Heavy Electricals Limited at a cost of ₹423 crore (equivalent to ₹448 crore or US$47 million in 2023), the floating plant consists of 40 blocks, each capable of producing 2.5 MW. These segments house a floating structure carrying 11,200 solar panels, all mounted on High-density polyethylene floaters.
