= Jhanor-Gandhar Thermal Power Station =

Power plant in Bharuch, Gujarat, India

- Country: India
- Location: Bharuch, Gujarat
- Coordinates: 21°46′48″N 72°58′45″E
- Status: Operational
- Owner: NTPC
- Operator: NTPC Limited

Thermal power station
- Primary fuel: Natural gas
- Combined cycle?: Yes

Power generation
- Units operational: 3 X 131 MW; 1 X 255 MW
- Nameplate capacity: 648 MW

NTPC Jhanor-Gandhar Gas Power Project is a gas-based power plant run by National Thermal Power Corporation (NTPC), located at Urja Nagar, in Bharuch district in the Indian state of Gujarat. The power plant its gas from the Gandhar Gas field, and water from the Narmada River. The site is about 18 km north-east of Bharuch City. This is a base load, combined cycle power plant. The waste heat from the outlet gases of gas turbine is used to heat water in a waste heat recovery boiler (WHRB) of Kawasaki make and subsequently run the steam turbine. The gas turbine capacity is increased to 144.3 MW by injecting de-mineralised water into the combustion chamber. The plant capacity is 657.39 MW (144.3*3+224.49) MW. The plant receives natural gas from Gujarat State Petronet Corporation Ltd (GSPC) and Gas Authority of India Ltd. (GAIL). The power transmission is at 220 kV and 400 kV.

Stage	Unit number	Installed capacity (MW)	Date of commissioning	GT / ST
1st	1	131	1994 March	GT
1st	2	131	1994 March	GT
1st	3	131	1994 May	GT
1st	4	255	1995 March	ST
Total	4	648		
