= Faridabad Combined Cycle Power Plant =

Power plant in Haryana, India

Faridabad Combined Cycle Gas Power Plant
- Country: India
- Location: Faridabad, Haryana
- Coordinates: 28°20′46″N 77°21′30″E
- Status: Operational
- Owner: NTPC

Thermal power station
- Primary fuel: Natural gas
- Combined cycle?: Yes

Power generation
- Units operational: 2 X 143 MW; 1 X 144 MW
- Nameplate capacity: 430 MW

Faridabad Combined Cycle Gas Power Plant or NTPC Faridabad is located at Faridabad, in Faridabad district in the Indian state of Haryana. The power plant is one of the gas-based power plants owned by NTPC. The gas for the power plant is sourced from GAIL HBJ Pipeline. Source of water for the power plant is Rampur distributories of Gurgaon canal.

== Capacity ==
Stage	Unit Number	Installed Capacity (MW)	Date of Commissioning	GT / ST
1st	1	137	1999 June	GT
1st	2	137	1999 October	GT
1st	3	156	2000 July	ST
Total	Three	430		
