= LARA Super Thermal Power Station =

Power plant in Raigarh, India

Lara Super Thermal Power Station
- Country: India
- Location: Raigarh, Chhattisgarh
- Coordinates: 21°44′57″N 83°27′56″E
- Status: Commissioned
- Owner: National Thermal Power Corporation

Thermal power station
- Primary fuel: Coal

Power generation
- Nameplate capacity: 1600;MW

External links
- Website: ntpc.co.in

Lara Super Thermal Power Station is a coal-fired power project located near village Lara, Taluk Pussore, Raigarh district in the Indian state of Chhattisgarh. It is one of the coal based power plants of NTPC. The coal requirement will be obtained from Talaipalli coal block Mand Raigarh Coalfield and the water requirement will be sourced from Mahanadi River through Saradih Barrage.

== Capacity ==
Lara Super Thermal Power Project has an installed capacity of 1600 MW.

Stage	Unit number	Capacity (MW)	Date of commissioning	Status
1st	1	800	September 30, 2019	Commissioned
1st	2	800	July 20, 2020	Commissioned
