= Auraiya Thermal Power Station =

Power station in Uttar Pradesh, India

- Country: India
- Location: Dibiyapur, Auraiya, Uttar Pradesh
- Coordinates: 26°37′43″N 79°31′40″E
- Status: Operational
- Owner: NTPC
- Operator: NTPC Limited

Thermal power station
- Primary fuel: Natural gas
- Combined cycle?: Yes

Power generation
- Units operational: 4 X 110 MW; 2 X 106 MW
- Nameplate capacity: 652 MW

NTPC Auraiya is located at Dibiyapur in Auraiya district in the Indian state of Uttar Pradesh. The power plant is one of the gas-based power plants of NTPC. The gas for the power plant is sourced from GAIL HBJ Pipeline – South Basin Gas field. Source of water for the power plant is Auraiya – Etawah Canal.

== Capacity ==
| Stage | Unit Number | Installed Capacity (MW) | Date of Commissioning | GT / ST |
|---|---|---|---|---|
| 1st | 1 | 110 | 1989 March | GT |
| 1st | 2 | 110 | 1989 July | GT |
| 1st | 3 | 110 | 1989 August | GT |
| 1st | 4 | 110 | 1989 September | GT |
| 1st | 5 | 106 | 1989 December | ST |
| 1st | 6 | 106 | 1990 June | ST |
| Total | Six | 652 | | |
