= NTPC Rajgarh Solar Power Plant =

Photovoltaic power station in Rajgarh, India

- Country: India
- Location: Rajgarh, Madhya Pradesh
- Coordinates: 23.9621697°N 76.7230814°E
- Construction began: 2013
- Commission date: 2014
- Operator: National Thermal Power Corporation

Solar farm
- Type: Flat-panel PV

Power generation
- Nameplate capacity: 50 MW

NTPC Rajgarh Solar Power Plant is a photovoltaic power station in Rajgarh, Madhya Pradesh.

== History ==
The 50 MW solar power plant is built by the National Thermal Power Corporation. The first phase of 20 MW went online in 2014 and remaining plant became completely operational in 2018.
