= Darlipali Super Thermal Power Station =

Power station in India

- Location of the Darlipali Super Thermal Power Station in Odisha
- Official name: NTPC
- Country: India
- Location: Sundargarh
- Coordinates: 21°52′57″N 83°57′31″E
- Status: Under construction
- Owner: NTPC
- Operator: NTPC Limited

Thermal power station
- Primary fuel: Coal

Power generation
- Make and model: BHEL
- Nameplate capacity: 1600 MW

Darlipali Super Thermal Power Station at Darlipali village in Sundargarh district in Indian state of Odisha. It is one of the coal based power plants of NTPC Limited. Coal will be obtained from Dulanga and Pakri Barwadih Coal Block, and water supply will be sourced from the Hirakund Reservoir on the Mahanadi River through a pipeline over a distance of about 30.0 km from the project site. The plant is under construction by Bharat Heavy Electrical Limited (BHEL), L&T Power.

== Capacity ==
The plant has a planned capacity of 1600 MW (2x800 MW).

| Unit number | Capacity (MW) | Date of commissioning | Status |
|---|---|---|---|
| 1 | 900 | | Operational since December 2019. |
| 2 | 800 | | Operational since October 1, 2021. |
