= Khurja Super Thermal Power Plant =

Under construction power plant in Uttar Pradesh, India

- Official name: Khurja STPP
- Country: India
- Location: Dashahra Kherli, Khurja (Bulandshahr)
- Coordinates: 28.166757°N 77.903188°E
- Status: Under Construction
- Construction began: Dec 2018
- Construction cost: ₹12,676 Crores (US$1.83 billion)
- Owner: THDC Ltd

Thermal power station
- Primary fuel: Coal

Power generation
- Nameplate capacity: 1320 MW

External links
- Website: www.thdc.co.in

Khurja super thermal power project or Khurja STPP is an under construction 1320 megawatt, coal-fired supercritical power plant at Khurja in Bulandshahr, Uttar Pradesh, India. The project is the first thermal power project by THDC Ltd, projected to cost ₹12676 crores (US$1.8 billion). Both units of Khurja STPP have been synchronized with National Grid, Unit-1 in Oct’2024 & Unit-2 in Aug’2025 and are in commercial operation after COD declaration w.e.f. 26.01.2025 and 26.09.2025 respectively.

== Project ==
THDC Ltd floated tenders for award of main package in June 2018. Land has been acquired by THDC and project completion is planned by 2023. The coal requirement would be 7.2 million tonnes per annum which will be sourced from the Amelia Coal mines in Madhya Pradesh.

== Clearances ==
The project has been accorded environmental clearance by the Ministry of Environment, Forest and Climate Change (MoEF&CC). The environmental impact assessment report was submitted to MoEF&CC in November 2016.

== Capacity ==
The planned capacity of the thermal power plant is 1320 MW (2 x 660 MW)

Stage	Unit Number	Installed Capacity (MW)	Date of Commissioning	Status
Stage I	Unit I	660MW	26 Jan 2025	Operational
Stage I	Unit II	660MW	26 Sep 2025	Operational
