= Gadarwara Super Thermal Power Station =

Thermal power station in Madhya Pradesh, India

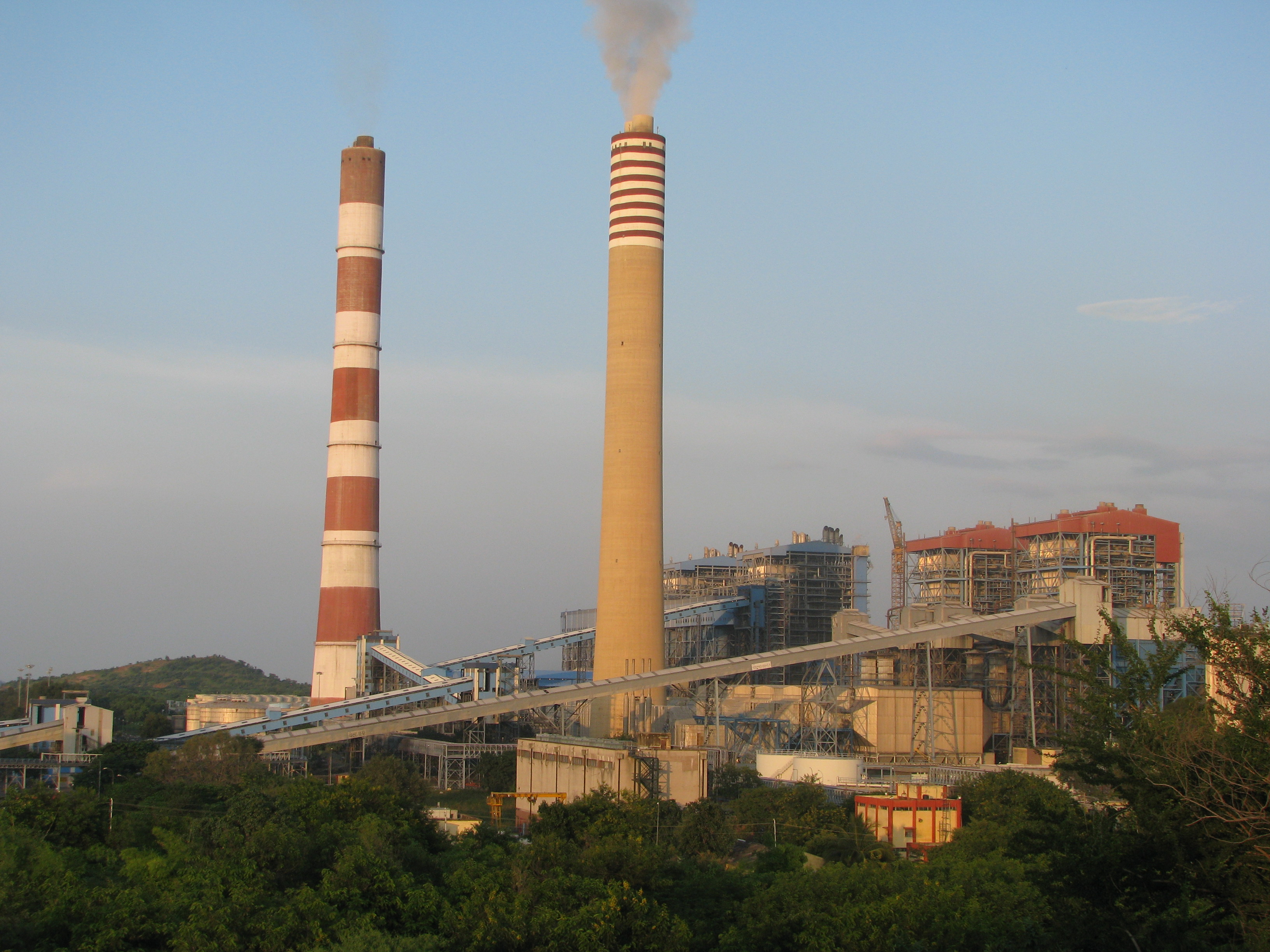
- NTPC Gadarwara Thermal Power Plant

- Location within Madhya Pradesh Location within India
- Official name: Gadarwara Super Thermal Power Station
- Country: India
- Location: Gadarwara, Narsinghpur district, Madhya Pradesh
- Coordinates: 22°51′22″N 78°51′24″E
- Status: Operational (Stage-I); Stage-II Approved
- Construction began: 2014
- Commission date: 2019–2021
- Operator: NTPC Limited

Thermal power station
- Primary fuel: Coal
- Turbine technology: Supercritical

Power generation
- Units operational: 2 × 800 MW
- Units planned: 2 × 800 MW (Stage-II)
- Nameplate capacity: 1,600 MW (operational)

External links
- Website: www.ntpc.co.in

Gadarwara Super Thermal Power Station is a coal-based thermal power station located near Gangai village in Gadarwara tehsil of Narsinghpur district in the Indian state of Madhya Pradesh. The power station is owned and operated by NTPC Limited, India's largest power generation utility. With a planned ultimate capacity of 3,200 MW (4×800 MW), it is one of the major supercritical thermal power projects in central India.

As of 2024, Stage-I of the project, comprising two units of 800 MW each (total 1,600 MW), is fully operational and in commercial operation. Stage-II, consisting of an additional two units of 800 MW each, received investment approval from the NTPC Board in November 2024.

== History ==
=== Planning and approval ===
The Gadarwara Super Thermal Power Project was conceived as part of NTPC's expansion plan during India's 12th Five-Year Plan period to add over 14,000 MW of capacity. The project received environmental clearance from the Ministry of Environment, Forest and Climate Change (MoEFCC) on 22 March 2013.

The foundation stone for the project was laid in February 2014 with an initial cost estimate of approximately ₹25,000 crore (US$3.4 billion). NTPC awarded the EPC contract to Bharat Heavy Electricals Limited (BHEL) for the execution of Stage-I of the project.

=== Construction and commissioning ===
The first unit (800 MW) achieved grid synchronization on 30 August 2018 at 05:12 AM IST, marking a significant milestone in the project's development. The unit was declared in commercial operation on 30 April 2019, with the revised cost estimate for Stage-I finalized at ₹15,105.22 crore.

The second unit (800 MW) was included in the installed capacity on 18 February 2021 and declared in commercial operation on 1 March 2021. With the commissioning of both units, NTPC's commercial capacity reached 52,115 MW, and the NTPC Group's total capacity reached 64,880 MW as of March 2021.

=== Stage-II development ===
The Stage-II expansion (2×800 MW) received investment approval of ₹20,445.69 crore from the NTPC Board on 5 November 2024. The expansion was initially proposed to the Expert Appraisal Committee (EAC) in March 2024 but required additional environmental information. A revised proposal was submitted in August 2024, and tendering for the project commenced in early 2025.

== Design and specifications ==
=== Technology ===
The Gadarwara Super Thermal Power Station employs supercritical technology, which operates at higher pressures and temperatures compared to conventional subcritical plants. This technology results in improved thermal efficiency of approximately 38–40% and reduced greenhouse gas emissions per unit of electricity generated.

=== Equipment and manufacturing ===
BHEL's comprehensive scope for Stage-I included the design, engineering, manufacturing, supply, erection, and commissioning of major equipment including:

- Supercritical boilers
- Steam turbines rated at 800 MW
- Generators
- Electrostatic precipitators (ESPs)
- Controls and instrumentation systems
- Associated auxiliaries

The equipment was manufactured at various BHEL facilities across India, including Trichy (boilers), Haridwar (turbines), Bhopal (auxiliaries), Ranipet (transformers), Hyderabad (control systems), and Jhansi (boiler auxiliaries).

=== Performance ===
The plant is designed to operate at a Plant Load Factor (PLF) of 90%, ensuring high availability and efficient power generation. Both operational units utilize advanced emission control systems to meet India's stringent environmental norms.

== Capacity ==
The project is being developed in two stages:

Stage	Unit Number	Capacity (MW)	Date of Commercial Operation	Status
Stage-I	1	800	30 April 2019	Operational
Stage-I	2	800	1 March 2021	Operational
Stage-II	3	800	TBD	Approved (under development)
Stage-II	4	800	TBD	Approved (under development)
Total Capacity		3,200		

== Fuel and water supply ==
=== Coal supply ===
The primary fuel source for the power station is coal from the Talaipalli coal block located in Chhattisgarh. The plant requires approximately 8 million tonnes per annum (MTPA) of coal at 90% PLF for its ultimate capacity. The Talaipalli coal block has received environment and forest clearances for coal mining operations.

=== Water supply ===
Water for the power station is sourced from the Narmada River, located approximately 30 kilometers from the project site. A dedicated pipeline has been laid from the river to the plant site. The Madhya Pradesh Water Resources Department constructed a small weir on the river to ensure adequate water supply without causing submergence of agricultural lands.

== Land acquisition ==
=== Land details ===
According to the Environmental Clearance dated 22 March 2013, the total land requirement for the project is 1,990 acres (approximately 805 hectares). As of 2024, a total of 2,250.40 acres (910.706 hectares) has been acquired for the project.

The land acquisition comprised:

- Barren government land: 318 acres (transferred by Government of Madhya Pradesh)
- Government agricultural land: 45 acres
- Private agricultural land: 1,580 acres (acquired from local farmers)
- Other government land: 47 acres

=== Affected villages ===
The land acquisition affected six villages in the Gadarwara region:

1. Chor Barhata
2. Dongargaon
3. Gangai
4. Kudari
5. Mehra Kheda
6. Umaria

Approximately 500 farmers from these villages were affected by the land acquisition process.

== Environmental and social issues ==
=== Farmer protests ===
The project has faced significant opposition from local farmers since land acquisition began in 2013. Major protests erupted in December 2017, with farmers alleging broken promises regarding employment opportunities made during the land acquisition phase.

On 12 January 2018, farmers held protests and submitted a memorandum demanding jobs for displaced families. Protests continued for over 15 days, with a massive agitation planned for New Delhi on 23 February 2018. Intermittent protests have continued through subsequent years regarding rehabilitation and employment issues.

=== Environmental concerns ===
Local communities have reported several environmental impacts:

- Fly ash from the plant affecting nearby agricultural lands
- Reduction in crop production due to ash pollution
- Groundwater pollution in surrounding areas
- Declining groundwater levels
- Respiratory health issues among the local population due to coal dust

NTPC has placed warnings on hand pumps in affected villages indicating that water is not potable, forcing villagers to use contaminated water sources.

=== Corporate social responsibility ===
NTPC committed to a one-time investment of ₹45.60 crore for CSR activities during the construction phase and an annual commitment of ₹9.2 crore for development work in affected villages. However, local advocacy groups and civil society organizations have raised concerns about inadequate implementation of these commitments.

== Current operations and future expansion ==
As of 2024, both units of Stage-I (1,600 MW) are fully operational and contribute to the national power grid. The power generated from the station helps meet the energy demands of central India and supports the country's industrial and economic growth.

Stage-II development is progressing with investment approval secured and tendering processes underway. Upon completion of Stage-II, the Gadarwara Super Thermal Power Station will achieve its ultimate capacity of 3,200 MW, making it one of the largest thermal power generation facilities in Madhya Pradesh.

The project is part of NTPC's broader plan to add approximately 13.6 GW of thermal capacity by fiscal year 2026-27, supporting India's target of adding 80 GW of thermal power capacity by 2031-32.

== See also ==
- NTPC Limited
- List of power stations in India
- Supercritical steam generator
- Bharat Heavy Electricals Limited
- List of coal power stations
- Energy in India
