= Solapur Super Thermal Power Station =

Power station in Maharashtra, India

Solapur Super Thermal Power Station - NTPC
- Country: India
- Location: Solapur Maharashtra
- Coordinates: 17°33′16″N 75°58′59″E
- Status: Operational
- Commission date: 2017
- Operator: National Thermal Power Corporation Limited (NTPCL)

Thermal power station
- Primary fuel: Coal

Power generation
- Nameplate capacity: 1320 MW

Solapur Super Thermal Power Station is under construction located at Fatatewadi and Aherwadi village in Solapur district in Indian state of Maharashtra. The power plant is one of the coal based power plants of National Thermal Power Corporation Limited (NTPCL).

The water for the power project will be sourced from reservoir of Ujjani Dam on Bhima River.

== Capacity ==
The power station has a planned capacity of 1320 MW (2x660 MW). The first unit of Solapur Super Thermal power station was commissioned and declared commercial on 25 September 2017.

Unit Number	Capacity (MW)	Date of Commissioning	Status
1	660	2017 April	Commissioned
2	660	2019 April	Commissioned
