= NSPCL =

Indian utility provider

NTPC-SAIL Power Company Limited एनटीपीसी – सेल पावर कंपनी लिमिटेड
- Type: Joint Venture of NTPC Limited and SAIL
- Industry: Thermal Power Plant
- Founded: 2001
- Headquarters: Delhi, India
- Key people: Saptarshi Roy, IPES (Chairman)
- Products: Electricity
- Revenue: ▲₹1,316.9 million (US$14 million) (2015–16)
- Net income: ▲₹17,378.6 million (US$180 million)(2015–16)
- Owner: Steel Authority of India Govt. of India Ministry of Steel; National Thermal Power Corporation Ministry of Power Government of the Republic of India

NSPCL (NTPC-SAIL Power Company Limited) is a joint venture of National Thermal Power Corporation and Steel Authority of India Limited. engaged in power generation primarily to meet the captive power requirement of various steel plants of SAIL throughout India. It is one of the institutional category III profit making Indian PSEs.

== History ==
NTPC and SAIL joined forces in March 2001 and took over a captive power plant (consisting of 2x60MW generators) located at the Durgapur Steel Plant and another (also 2x60 MW) at the Rourkela Steel Plant.

NTPC formed another joint venture company with SAIL on in March 2002 in the name of Bhilai Electric Supply Company Ltd. (BESCL). BESCL took over a captive power plant (comprising 2x 30 MW generators and one 14MW back-power turbo generator) located at the Bhilai Steel Plant from SAIL. Effective 11 September 2006, BESCL became part of NSPCL.

=== Growth ===
Since 2006, NSPCL has provided all power required by the Bhilai, Durgapur and Rourkela steel plants. To meet growing demands, NSPCL commissioned an expansion project at Bhilai comprising two 250 MW generators during 2008–2009, and brought the units online in 2009–2010. From the expansion plant, NSPCL is supplying power to the beneficiaries viz. Union Territory of Dadra & Nagar Haveli, Union Territory of Daman & Diu, Chhattishgarh and Bhilai Steel Plant / SAIL in the western region. Total installed capacity of NSPCL and projects are as follows

Sr. No.	Location	District	State	Capacity in Megawatt
1	Rourkela	Sundergarh	Odisha	60x2
2	Durgapur	Burdwan	West Bengal	60x2
3	Bhilai	Durg	Chhattisgarh	30x2+14x1
4	Bhilai Expansion Project	Durg	Chhattisgarh	250x2
Total				814

== Projects Under Construction ==
Following projects are under construction at Rourkela and Durgapur to meet the captive power requirement of Rourkela and Durgapur steel plants respectively.

Sr. No.	Location	District	State	Capacity in Megawatt
1	Rourkela	Sundergarh	Odisha	1x250
2	Durgapur	Burdwan	West Bengal	2x20
Total				290

== Proposed Projects ==
The company is also expecting further capacity addition at various units of SAIL.

Sr. No.	Location	District	State	Capacity in Megawatt
1	Bhilai	Durg	Chhattisgarh	1x250
2	Salem	Salem	Tamil Nadu	50 MWp Solar
3	Bokaro	Bokaro	Jharkhand	50 MWp Solar
Total				350
