= NTPC Kawas =

Power station in Gujarat, India

Kawas Thermal Power Station
- Country: India
- Location: Surat, Gujarat
- Coordinates: 21°10′14″N 72°41′20″E
- Status: Operational
- Owner: NTPC

Thermal power station
- Primary fuel: Natural gas

Power generation
- Units operational: 4 X 106 MW; 2 X 110.5 MW
- Nameplate capacity: 645 MW

NTPC Kawas is located at Aditya Nagar, Hazira in Surat district in the Indian state of Gujarat. The power plant is the gas-based combined cycle power plants of NTPC. The gas for the power plant is sourced from GAIL HBJ Pipeline – South Basin Gas field. Source of water for the power plant is Hazira Branch Canal Singanpur Weir.

== Capacity ==
Type	Unit Number	Installed Capacity (MW)	Date of Commissioning
Gas Turbine	1	106.1	1992 March
Gas Turbine	2	106.1	1992 May
Gas Turbine	3	106.1	1992 June
Gas Turbine	4	106.1	1992 November
Steam Turbine	5	116.1	1993 February
Steam Turbine	6	116.1	1993 March
Total	6	656	
