= NTPC Port Blair Solar Power Plant =

Photovoltaic power station in Port Blair, India

- Country: India
- Location: Garacharma, Port Blair, Andaman and Nicobar Islands
- Coordinates: 11.611359°N 92.7100687°E
- Construction began: 2017
- Commission date: 2018
- Operator: National Thermal Power Corporation

Solar farm
- Type: Flat-panel PV

Power generation
- Nameplate capacity: 5 MW

NTPC Port Blair Solar Power Plant is a photovoltaic power station owned and operated by NTPC Limited in Port Blair, Andaman and Nicobar Islands, India.

== History ==
The plant was conceptualized in 2011, and its project design document (PDD) was ratified by the United Nations Framework Convention on Climate Change in 2012.

In 2018, the 5 MW plant was commissioned and it became the "first grid-connected solar photovoltaic project" in the Andaman Islands.

== See also ==
- NLC Dolly Gunj Solar Power Plant
