= Rammam Hydro =

Rammam hydro power project is a NTPC owned run-of-the-river based project approx 150 km from Bagdogra / Siliguri in Darjeeling district, West Bengal, India. Darjeeling town is 50 km from the project. Capacity of power generation is 120 (3 x 40) MW,
