= Jhingurdah =

Coordinates: 24.196°N 82.700°E

Jhingurdah is a city and one of the projects of Northern Coalfields Limited (NCL) which is a subsidiary company of state-owned Coal India Limited. It lies in the Singrauli District of Madhya Pradesh. Most of the people in Jhingurdah are employed in the Jhingurdah coalfields of NCL.

== Education ==
There are two major schools in Jhingurdah; DAV Public School and Saraswati Sishu Mandir.

== Connectivity ==
Jhingurdah is approximately 40 km from the district collectorate. It is 30 km away from the Singrauli Junction Railway Station. Nearest airport is Lal Bahadur Shastri Airport, Babatpur, Varanasi and is 210 km away from Singrauli Junction by rail.

== Local attractions ==
- Jhingurdah Hanuman Mandir : This temple is dedicated to Lord Hanuman and many folks from far and near come down to this temple to pay respects as part of obeisance of their Hindu religion. This temple is unique in many ways and is located on a top of a hill which ensures that its windy out here. One needs to climb a number of steps to reach to the temple from parking area. Some locals claim that this is the place where Lord Hanuman was born. Another unique attribute of this temple in Jhingurdah is the cricket noise that is evidently heard from far off places as one approaches this temple. "Jhingur" in Hindi refers to an insect from Cricket family and is recognized by the noise it makes.
- Tippa Jharia : It is a local picnic spot where school children normally show up during onset or offset of Winter season. One can find lotus flowers blooming in the Tippa Jharia lake all the year round and locals consider that as nothing less than magic on spiritual levels. This lake is only about 2–3 km from the Hanuman temple. This delicate ecosystem seems untouched by mankind however we should make all efforts to preserve this natural habitat and keep it clear and clean as it is an ecosystem as well.
