= Kameng Hydro Electric Project =

Kameng Hydro Electric Project is a run-of-the river based project situated on Bichom and Tenga Rivers, both tributaries of the Kameng River in West Kameng district of Arunachal Pradesh. Total installed capacity of project is 600 (4×150) MW. Two units were commissioned in 2020–21 and remain two units are ongoing.
