= Lata Tapovan =

Lata Tapovan Hydro Electric Power Project is Run of the River based project located Approx 25 km from Joshimath in dist. Chamoli in Uttarakhand. The Joshimath town is 230 km from Rishikesh. Capacity of project is 171 MW Underground (3 x 57 MW) The project has been suspended by the order of Supreme Court of India since 2014 and the matter is still pending in the court.
