= Singrauli Super Thermal Power Station =

Coal-fired power station in Uttar Pradesh

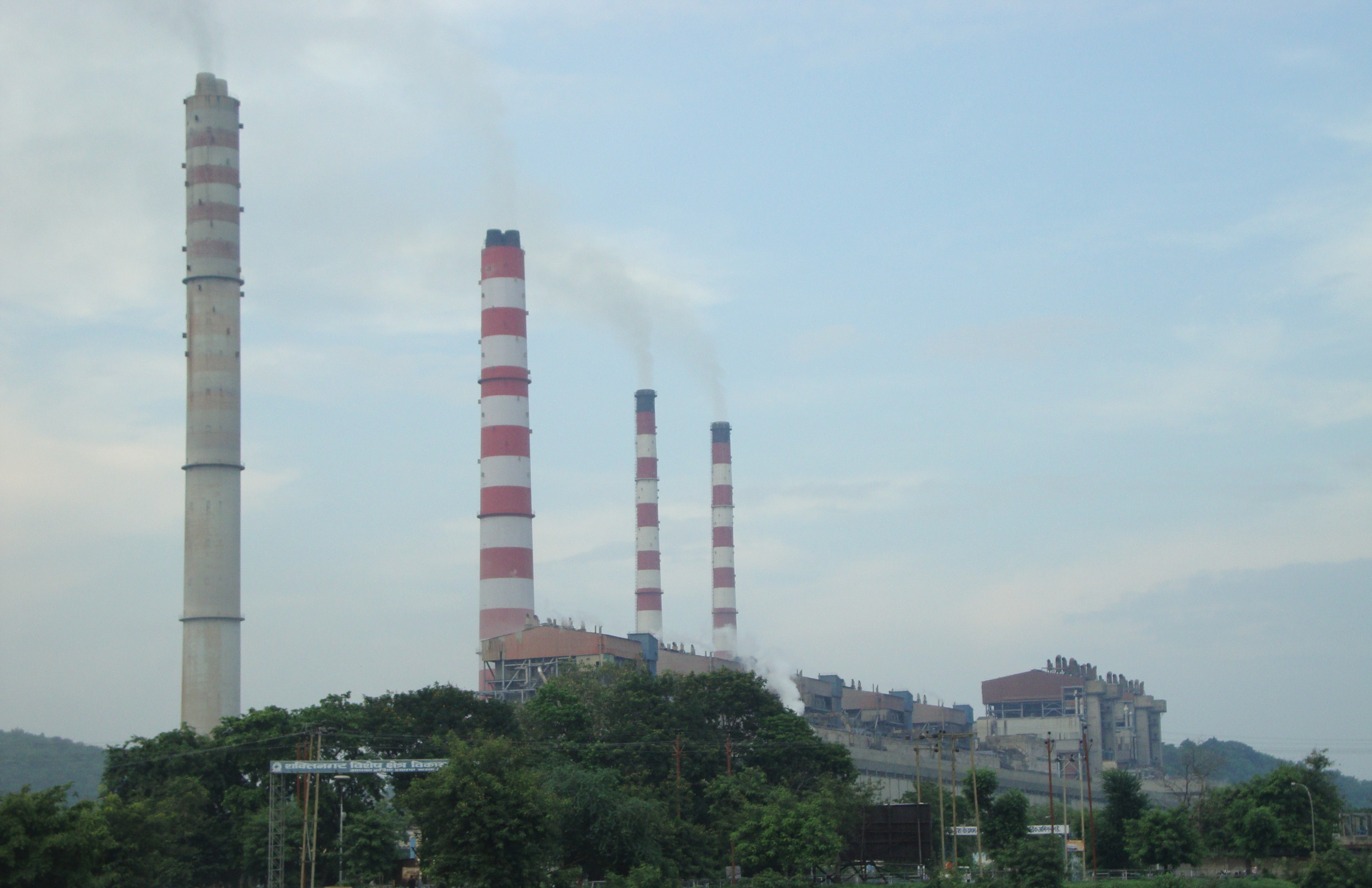
- Country: India
- Location: Shaktinagar, Uttar Pradesh
- Coordinates: 24.105168°N 82.706384°E
- Status: Operational
- Commission date: 1986
- Owner: NTPC

Thermal power station
- Primary fuel: Coal

Power generation
- Units operational: Stage - I: 5 × 200 MW; Stage -II: 2 × 500 MW; Solar PV: 15 MW
- Nameplate capacity: 2,015 MW

External links
- Website: ntpc.co.in

Singrauli Super Thermal Power Plant is located at Shaktinagar in Sonebhadra district in Indian state of Uttar Pradesh. The power plant is the first power plant of NTPC. It sources coal from Jayant and Bina mines and water from Rihand Reservoir. The states benefitting from this power plant are Uttar Pradesh, Uttarakhand, Rajasthan, Punjab, Haryana and Himachal Pradesh and the Union Territories of Delhi, Chandigarh and Jammu and Kashmir. An investment worth ₹1,190.7 crore (US$120 million) has already been cleared. It even gets international assistance from IDA.

ON 31 December 2014, a 15 MW solar PV was commissioned at NTPC SIngrauli. An 8 MW small hydro CW discharge plant has been constructed on discharge canal.

== Coal base ==
The unit wise capacity and other details are as follows.

Stage	Unit Number	Installed Capacity (MW)	Date of Commissioning
1st	1	200	1982 November
1st	2	200	1982 November
1st	3	200	1983 March
1st	4	200	1983 November
1st	5	200	1984 February
2nd	6	500	1986 December
2nd	7	500	1987 November
Total	Seven	2000	

=== Renewable energy ===
Type	Installed Capacity (MW)	Date of Commissioning
Solar PV	15	2014 December
CW Discharge	8	2018 March
Total	23	
