= Simhadri Super Thermal Power Station =

Building in India

Simhadri Super Thermal Power Plant
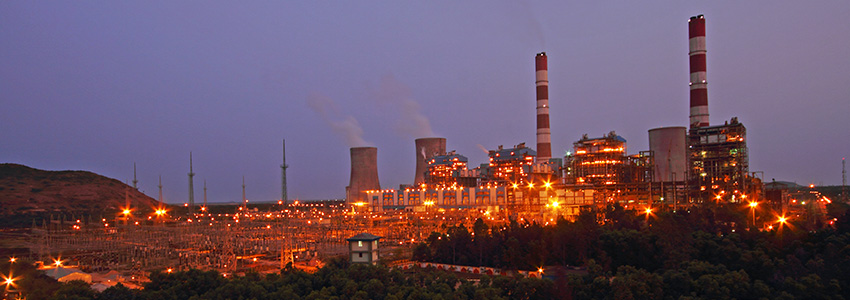
- View of NTPC Simhadri Super thermal power plant
- Country: India
- Location: Visakhapatnam, Andhra Pradesh
- Coordinates: 17.5938°N 83.0897°E
- Status: Operational
- Commission date: 2002
- Owner: NTPC

Thermal power station
- Primary fuel: Coal

Power generation
- Units operational: 4 X 500 MW
- Nameplate capacity: 2,000 MW

External links
- Commons: Related media on Commons

Simhadri Super Thermal Power Plant is a coal-fired power plant located in the outskirts of Anakapalli city in the Indian state of Andhra Pradesh. The power plant is one of the coal-fired power plants of NTPC, a Government of India enterprise. The coal for the power plant is sourced from Kalinga Block of Talcher Coal fields in Odisha. The plant is a national asset, and power generated is shared between multiple states, as the operator is national. Power generated by units 1 and 2, making up for 1,000 MW, is dedicated to power distribution companies owned by the Government of Andhra Pradesh and Telangana. The remaining 1,000 MW, generated by units 3 and 4, is allocated to the states of Odisha, Tamil Nadu, Karnataka, Andhra Pradesh, Telangana and Puducherry as per their shares as decided in PPA.

NTPC Simhadri is a modern coal-fired power plant, and is a combination of four independent generation units, with common water and fuel sources, and common ash ponds. Each of the four units has a nameplate capacity of 500 MW. Units 1 and 2 were built in the first phase of development, and were commissioned in February 2002 and August 2004, respectively, to meet urgent needs of power in the largely agrarian Coastal Andhra and North-Coastal Andhra regions. Units 3 and 4 were built in the second phase, and commissioned in March 2011 and March 2012, respectively. Since the operator of this plant is a Government of India enterprise, and since the plant was built with central government funds, power generated by units 3 and 4 are sold to distribution companies based in neighbouring states of Odisha, Tamil Nadu, and Karnataka, over the National Grid, as power stocks. The allocations are decided between NTPC and the three states' discoms. Unsold units are offered to discoms of Andhra Pradesh for purchase at market prices.

Coal for NTPC Simhadri is sourced from Talcher Coal Fields, Odisha, and transported by East Coast Railway (ECoR), over the Kolkata-Chennai trunk line, with a spur heading towards the plant at Duvvada. Unlike other coal-fired plants located in the Indian hinterlands, which use water of the same kind as working fluid and coolant, NTPC Simhadri, which operates out of a fresh water-deficient region of Andhra Pradesh, diversified its water sourcing, based on usage. It uses fresh water sourced from the Yeluru Canal as working fluid (steam which turns the turbines). For cooling, however, the plant uses seawater pumped in from the Bay of Bengal. Seawater, with its salt content, is unfit to be used as working fluid, without desalination.

== Environment protection activities in NTPC Simhadri ==
The Simhadri Super Thermal Power Station (2×500 MW in Stage-I and 2×500 MW in Stage-II) is the first coastal coal-fired thermal power station of NTPC Limited. More than 85% of Simhadri Plant's water needs are met from sea. Having spent nearly Rs. 1000 Cr towards various equipments and systems for mitigating pollution and protecting environment, NTPC Simhadri planted over 7.0 lakh trees for protection of environment. Besides, NTPC Simhadri is also a partner of "Green Visakha" Project and has planted 3.5 lakh trees additionally under this program and distributed 1.25 lakh fruit bearing plants. NTPC also contributed Rs. 6.0 Cr towards conservation of Olive Ridley turtles. Furthermore, the power station and township premises are declared as plastic-free zones.
