= Kudgi Super Thermal Power Station =

Power station in Karnataka, India

- Official name: NTPC Kudgi
- Country: India
- Location: Bijapur, Karnataka
- Coordinates: 16°30′00″N 75°50′00″E
- Status: Commissioned
- Commission date: 2016
- Owner: NTPC Limited
- Operator: NTPC Limited

Thermal power station
- Primary fuel: Coal
- Secondary fuel: Light Diesel Oil

Power generation
- Units operational: 3
- Nameplate capacity: 2400;MW

External links
- Website: www.ntpc.co.in

Kudgi Super Thermal Power Station is a power station located at Kudgi village of Basavana Bagewadi Taluq in Bijapur district, Karnataka in Indian state of Karnataka. This is one of the coal based thermal power plants of NTPC Limited.

The coal for the plant will be derived from NTPC's Pakhri Barwadih coal block in Jharkhand.

The Construction Power required for stage-1 erection was drawn from M/s Hescom (Hubli Electricity Supply Company) through 2 no. of dedicated 33kV OH lines from Basavana Bagewadi and Mattihal substations of Hescom.

The water source is from reservoir of Almatti Dam which is constructed on Krishna River.

== Capacity ==
Kudgi Super Thermal Power Project will have an installed capacity of 4000 MW (3x800 MW in first stage and 2x800 MW in second stage). Doosan Power systems India Pvt Ltd will supply Steam Generator for the plant & Toshiba JSW Power Systems Pvt Ltd will supply super-critical steam turbine and generator and L&T Howden will supply Axial fans to NTPC for the plant. A 160 MWh CO_{2} battery is also projected.

Stage	Unit Number	power (MW)	Date of Commissioning	Status
1st	1	800	2016 Dec	Commissioned
1st	2	800	2017 March	Commissioned
1st	3	800	2018 March	Commissioned.
2nd	4	800		Yet to be approved
2nd	5	800		Yet to be approved
