= Ranganadi Dam =

- Interactive map of Ranganadi Dam
- Location: Arunachal Pradesh, India
- Coordinates: 27°20′34″N 93°49′0″E
- Construction began: 1988
- Opening date: 2001
- Owner: North Eastern Electric Power Corporation Limited (NEEPCO)

Dam and spillways
- Type of dam: Concrete gravity, diversion
- Impounds: Ranganadi River
- Height: 68 m (223 ft)
- Length: 339 m (1,112 ft)
- Spillway type: Service, gate-controlled

Reservoir
- Creates: Ranganadi Reservoir

Dikrong Power House
- Coordinates: 27°15′27″N 93°47′32″E
- Operator: North Eastern Electric Power Corporation (NEEPCO)
- Commission date: January 2002
- Type: Run-of-the-river
- Turbines: 3 x 135 MW Francis-type
- Installed capacity: 405 MW

The Ranganadi Dam is a concrete-gravity diversion dam on the Ranganadi River (also known as Panyor River) in Arunachal Pradesh, India which serves a run-of-the-river scheme.

== Power generation ==
The dam is intended for hydroelectric purposes and is part of Stage I of the Ranganadi Hydro Electric Project and supports the 405-megawatt (543,000 hp) Dikrong Power House. The 68 m (223 ft) tall dam diverts water south into a 10.1 km (6.3 mi) headrace tunnel which is then transferred into a 1,062 m (3,484 ft) penstock before reaching the three 135 megawatts (181,000 hp) turbines. Since commissioning, the power house has been generating much less than its capacity because of drought.

Stage II of the project is designed to provide water storage for Stage I and includes a 134 m (440 ft) rock-fill embankment dam with a 523,000,000 m^{3} (1.85×10^{10} ft^{3}) storage capacity. This dam will support an additional 180 megawatts (240,000 hp) power station.

== See also ==
- Dibang Dam
