= Koteshwar Dam =

- Location within Uttarakhand
- Country: India
- Location: New Tehri
- Coordinates: 30°15′37″N 78°29′53″E
- Opening date: 2011
- Owner: Tehri Hydro Development Corporation

Dam and spillways
- Type of dam: Gravity
- Height: 97.5 m (320 ft)
- Length: 300 m (984 ft)
- Elevation at crest: 618.5 m (2,029 ft)
- Dam volume: 560,000 m^{3} (732,452 cu yd)
- Spillway type: Service, 4 x radial gate controlled
- Spillway capacity: 13,240 m^{3}/s (467,566 cu ft/s)

Reservoir
- Total capacity: 88,900,000 m^{3} (72,072 acre⋅ft)
- Active capacity: 35,000,000 m^{3} (28,375 acre⋅ft)
- Catchment area: 7,691 km^{2} (2,970 sq mi)
- Surface area: 29 km^{2} (11 sq mi)
- Normal elevation: 612.5 m (2,010 ft) (full)

Power Station
- Commission date: 2011-2012
- Hydraulic head: 75 m (246 ft) (max)
- Turbines: 4 x 100 MW Francis-type
- Installed capacity: 400 MW

The Koteshwar Dam is a gravity dam on the Bhagirathi River, located 22 km (14 mi) downstream of the Tehri Dam in Tehri District, Uttarakhand, India. The dam is part of the Tehri Hydropower Complex and serves to regulate the Tehri Dam's tailrace for irrigation and to create the lower reservoir of the Tehri Pumped Storage Power Station. In addition, the dam has a 400 MW (4x100 MW) run-of-the-river power station. The project was approved in 2000, and its first generator was commissioned on 27 March 2011, and the second on 30 March 2011. The construction site had been inundated in September 2010 by floods. The diversion tunnel was later blocked due to heaving/collapse of the hill in December 2010. The spillway was commissioned in Jan 2011. The last two generators were made operational in March 2012.

== Design ==
The dam is 97.5 m (320 ft) tall and 300 m (984 ft) long. It has a structural volume of 560,000 m^{3} (732,452 cu yd) and its crest lies at an elevation of 618.5 m (2,029 ft) above sea level. The dam's spillway consists of four 18 m (59 ft) wide and 16 m (52 ft) tall radial gates. When the reservoir is at flood level, the spillway has a discharge capacity of 13,240 m^{3}/s (467,566 cu ft/s). Receiving water from Tehri Dam and collecting it from an overall 7,691 km^{2} (2,970 sq mi) catchment area, the dam creates a reservoir with a 88,900,000 m^{3} (72,072 acre⋅ft) capacity, of which 35,000,000 m^{3} (28,375 acre⋅ft) is active (or "useful"). The reservoir's surface area is 29 km^{2} (11 sq mi) and at full pool, it lies at an elevation of 612.5 m (2,010 ft). The dam's power station is a run-of-the-river type and uses the active storage in the reservoir which can draw the lake down 30 m (98 ft) from full pool. The power house is located on the right bank of the river below the dam and contains 4 x 100 MW Francis turbine-generators. The height of the dam allows for a maximum 75 m (246 ft) of hydraulic head.

== See also ==
- List of power stations in India
- List of run-of-the-river hydroelectric power stations
