= NTPC Dadri =

Thermal power plant in Dadri, India

National Capital Power Station
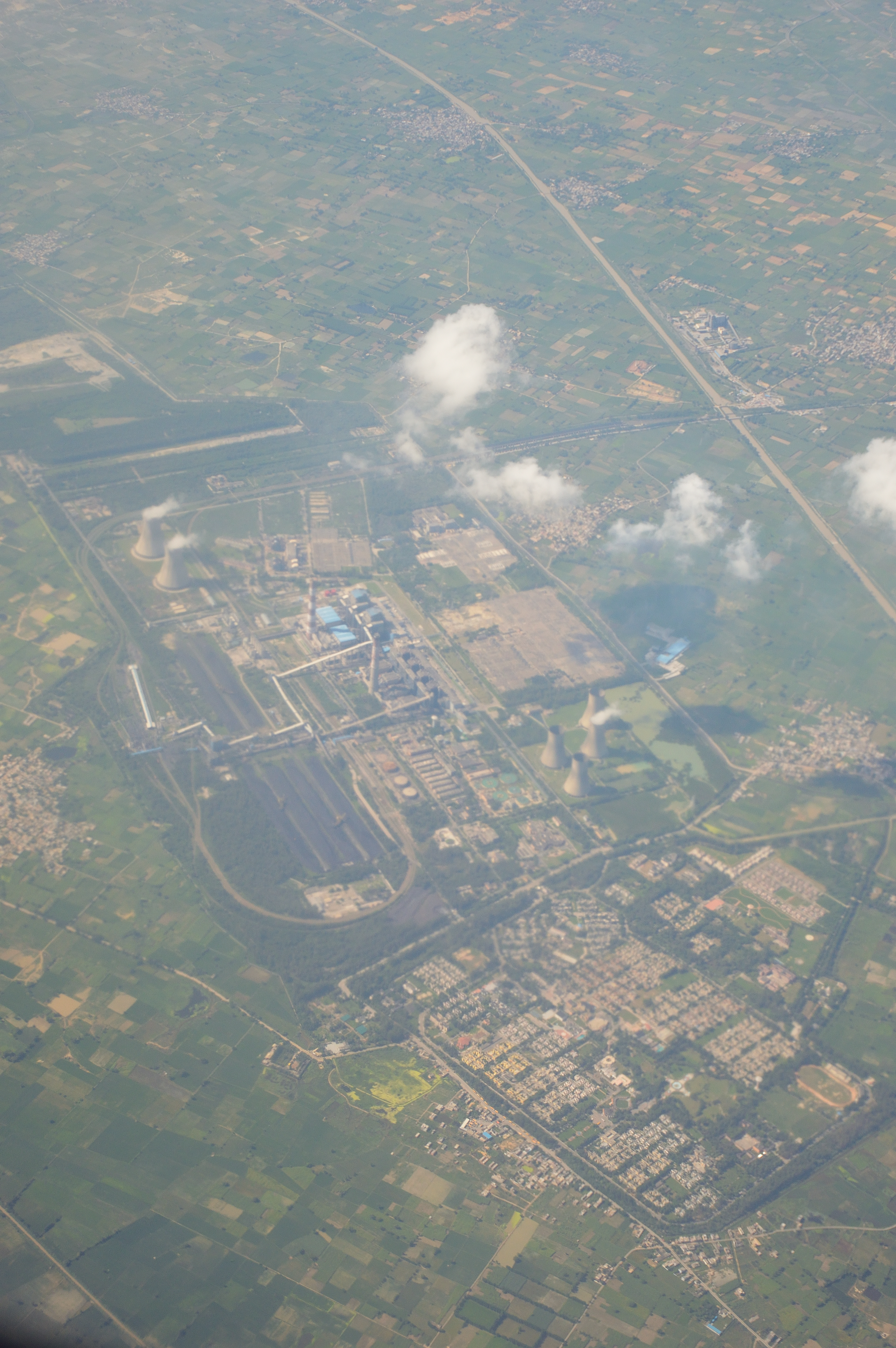
- Aerial view of NTPC power station, Dadri
- Country: India
- Location: Gautam Budh Nagar district, Uttar Pradesh
- Coordinates: 28°35′54″N 77°36′34″E
- Status: Operational
- Commission date: 1991
- Operator: NTPC

Thermal power station
- Primary fuel: Coal-fired, gas-fired

Power generation
- Units operational: 1840 MW coal 829.78 MW gas 5 MW SOLAR
- Nameplate capacity: 2,654 MW

National Capital Power Station (NCPS) or NTPC Dadri is the power project to meet the power demand of National Capital Region (India). It has a huge coal-fired thermal power plant and a gas-fired plant and has a small township located in Uttar Pradesh, India for its employees. It is located in Gautam Budhh Nagar district of Uttar Pradesh about 25 km from Ghaziabad and about 9 km from Dadri. It is nearly 48 km from New Delhi towards Hapur. The township has an area of about 500 acres over all. NTPC Dadri is a branch of National Thermal Power Corporation (NTPC).

== Capacity ==
NTPC Dadri is a unique power plant of NTPC group which has both coal based thermal plant and gas based thermal plant of 1840 MW and 829.78 MW respectively and a 5 MW solar plant totaling 2674.78 MW.

=== Coal based ===
The coal for the power plant is sourced from Piparwar Mines, Jharkhand. The source of water for the power plant is Upper Ganga Canal.

Stage	Unit number	Installed capacity (MW)	Date of commissioning
1st	1	210	1991 October
1st	2	210	1992 December
1st	3	210	1993 March
1st	4	210	1994 March
2nd	5	500	2010 January
2nd	6	500	2010 July
Total	Six	1840	

=== Gas based ===
The gas for the power plant is sourced from GAIL HBJ Pipeline. It also supports HSD as alternate fuel. The source of water for the power plant is the Upper Ganga Canal.

Stage	Unit number	Installed capacity (MW)	Date of commissioning	GT / ST
1st	1	130.19	1992 March	GT
1st	2	130.19	1992 May	GT
1st	3	130.19	1992 June	GT
1st	4	130.19	1992 November	GT
1st	5	154.51	1993 February	ST
1st	6	154.51	1993 March	ST
Total	six	829.78		

The total capacity is 2674.78 MW.
