= North Eastern Electric Power Corporation Limited =

Central Public Sector Undertaking

North Eastern Electric Power Corporation Limited (NEEPCO)
- Company type: Central Public Sector Undertaking
- Industry: Electricity
- Founded: 2 April 1976; 50 years ago
- Headquarters: Shillong, Meghalaya, India
- Area served: Northeastern India
- Key people: Gurdeep Singh, (CMD) Additional charge
- Products: Electricity generation
- Revenue: 4,223 cr ( 2025/26)
- Operating income: 2,086 cr ( 2025/26)
- Net income: ₹953 crore (US$99 million) (2025/26)
- Total equity: ▲₹765,270,000,000 (US$8.0 billion) (2026)
- Owner: Ministry of Power, Government of India
- Number of employees: 1,269(Jun, 2026)
- Website: www.neepco.co.in

North Eastern Electric Power Corporation Limited (NEEPCO) is a central public sector undertaking. It is under the ownership of Ministry of Power, Government of India. It was formed on 2 April 1976 to plan, investigate, design, construct, generate, operate and maintain power stations in the North Eastern Region of India.NEEPCO is a subsidiary of the Maharatna PSU, NTPC Ltd. NEEPCO is conferred with the Schedule A- Miniratna Category-I CPSU status. NEEPCO recruits Engineers,CA,CMA and MBAs at the executive level, offering a pay scale of 50000-160000 ( IDA ) during training, and 60000-180000( IDA )after training. Various allowances are provided, including cafeteria allowance uniform allowance, performance related pay and others

== Venture ==
NEEPCO is embarking on a plan to generate power from non-conventional sources of energy, especially by tapping solar power and wind in the coming years. Current capacity of NEEPCO is 2057 MW. Project Under Construction (As on 2025)

  - 300 MW solar project in Bhanipura, Bikaner, Rajasthan.
  - HEO Hydro project 240 MW, Arunachal Pradesh
  - Tato-1 Hydro Project 186 MW, Arunachal Pradesh.
  - Tato-2 Hydro Project 700 MW, Arunachal Pradesh

== NTPC Limited takeover ==
On 21 November 2019, the Government of India approved the take over of North Eastern Electric Power Corporation Limited (NEEPCO) by NTPC Limited.

== See also ==
- Kopili Hydro Electric Project
- Ranganadi Dam
