= Khadaura =

Village in Madhya Pradesh, India

- Location within Madhya Pradesh
- Coordinates: 24°19′05″N 82°18′26″E
- Elevation: 396 m (1,299 ft)

Languages
  - Official: Hindi, Bagheli, English
- Time zone: UTC+5:30 (IST)
- Area code: 07801
- Vehicle registration: MP-66

Khadaura is a village in Madhya Pradesh, India.

== Overview ==
Khadaura is a small village located in Deosar tehsil of Singrauli district, Madhya Pradesh . The Khadaura village has 371 families and a total population of 1580 of which 833 are males while 747 are females as per Population Census 2011. In Khadaura village population of children with age 0-6 is 252 which makes up 15.95% of total population of village. Average sex ratio of Khadaura village is 897 which is lower than Madhya Pradesh state average of 931. Child sex ratio for the Khadaura as per census is 826, lower than Madhya Pradesh average of 918. Khadaura village has higher literacy rate compared to Madhya Pradesh. In 2011, literacy rate of Khadaura village was 74.85% compared to 69.32% of Madhya Pradesh. In Khadaura Male literacy stands at 88.06% while female literacy rate was 60.35%. As per constitution of India and Panchyati Raaj Act, Khadaura village is administrated by Sarpanch (Head of Village) who is elected representative of village.

== Caste Factor ==
Schedule tribe constitutes 9.24% while schedule caste were 6.71% of total population in Khadaura village.

== Work Profile ==
In Khadaura village out of total population, 546 were engaged in work activities. 80.77% of workers describe their work as Main Work (Employment or Earning more than 6 Months) while 19.23% were involved in Marginal activity providing livelihood for less than 6 months. Of 546 workers engaged in Main Work, 153 were cultivators (owner or co-owner) while 101 were Agricultural labourer.

== Places to visit ==
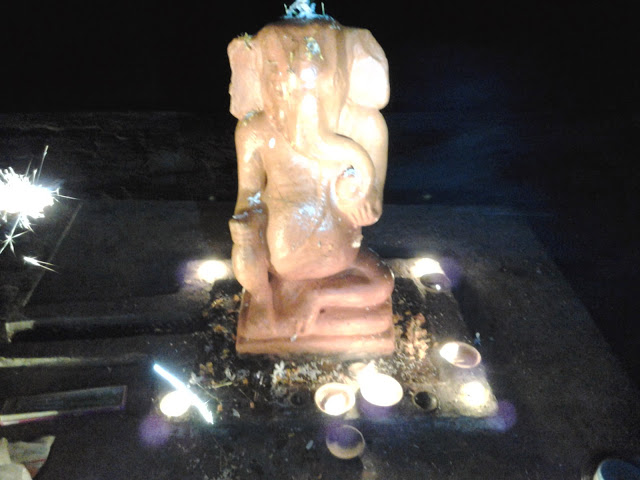
Ganesh Temple, Deosar

Shree Ganeshji temple, Deosar Hanuman Mandir, Khadaura, Deosar and Shree Guru Nilyam (Aacharya Ramadhar Chaturvedi) Khadaura, Deosar are located here. Khadaura talab near khadaura garden, Deosar
