= Dorahar =

Village in Uttar Pradesh, India

- Interactive map of Dorahar
- Coordinates: 24.01755598363695°N 82.82625249638038°E
- Country: India

Dorahar, Dodhar or Dorhar is a village situated in Dudhi Tehsil of Sonbhadra district in Uttar Pradesh, India.

The village is around 138 kilometres far from District Headquarters Robertsganj, Around 70 kilometres from Renukoot and less than 1 kilometre from Rihand Nagar, currently the population of the village is around 5000 and The Rihand Thermal Power Station and The Rihand Nagar are at a walkable distance from the village. It is located near the MP - UP border.

== Census data ==
Total Population	4315
Total No. of Houses	800
Female Population	2090
Literacy Rate	65.18

== History ==
Dodhar was considered as a forest from forest division Renukoot. The lands there were considered as section 4 forest land since 1960s and later on 2 and 3 October 1986 the peasants and farmers who were head by Shri Shiv Ram Singh protested for their land and rights and on behalf of them The Banwasi Seva Ashram filed a PIL in Hon'ble Supreme Court of India for the welfare of common public later these lands were transferred to local people and Rihand Thermal Power Station by the judgement of Hon'ble Supreme Court of India.

== Geographic location and nearby places ==
Dodhar is situated around 3 Kilometres far from Govind Ballabh Pant Sagar and it is close to Rihand Nagar, Bijpur, Nemana, Khairi, Naktu, Sirsoti and Mitihini

== Educational institutes ==
- St. Joseph's School, Rihand Nagar (Affiliated by Central Board of Secondary Education)
- Kendriya Vidyalaya, Rihand Nagar (Affiliated by Central Board of Secondary Education)
- Primary School, Dodhar (Affiliated by The State Govt. of Uttar Pradesh)

== Places to worship ==
- Rihandeshwar Mahadev Mandir, Rihand Nagar
- St. Joseph's Church, Rihand Nagar

== Hospitals ==
- Dhanwantari Hospital, Rihand Nagar

== Parks and playgrounds ==
- NTPC Rihand Stadium
- Sand Park, Rihand Nagar

== See also ==
- Bijpur
- Renukoot
- Anpara
- Waidhan
- Shakti Nagar
- Rihand Thermal Power Station
