= Ghoghara =

- village
- Location in Madhya Pradesh, India Ghoghara (India)
- Coordinates: 24°5′31″N 82°12′14″E
- Country: India
- State: Madhya Pradesh

Languages
  - Official: Hindi
- Time zone: UTC+5:30 (IST)

Ghoghara is a village of Sarai tehsil in Singrauli district of Madhya Pradesh.
