= Naugadh =

Naugadh Naugarh
- Location in Madhya Pradesh, India
- Coordinates: 24.081733°N 82.575211°E
- Country: India
- State: Madhya Pradesh
- Zone: Rewa
- District: Singrauli district
- Elevation: 376 m (1,234 ft)
- PIN: 486887
- Telephone code: +91 7805
- Vehicle registration: MP66

Naugadh is located in the city of Waidhan, Singrauli, Madhya Pradesh, India. It is 45th ward of Municipal corporation Singrauli. The village has a senior secondary school named Gayatri that offers education up to Class 12.
