= Devsar =

Devsar may refer to:

- Devsar, Navsari, a census town in Gujarat, India
- Devsar, Bhiwani, a village in Haryana, India
- Devsar, Jammu and Kashmir, a town in Kulgam district
- Devsar, Jammu and Kashmir Assembly constituency
- Devsar, Madhya Pradesh Assembly constituency
- Deosar or Devsar, a town in Singrauli district, Madhya Pradesh, India
