= Sarai, Singrauli =

Town in Singrauli, Madhya Pradesh

Sarai
- Town
- Location in Madhya Pradesh, India
- Coordinates: 24.05°N 82.20°E
- Country: India
- State: Madhya Pradesh
- District: Singrauli district

Sarai is a town and a Nagar Parishad in Singrauli District of Madhya Pradesh. It is also a Tehsil headquarter.

As per Census of India 2011 Sarai Town has population of 5,454 of which 2,829 are males while 2,625 are females.

Sarai is located on 24.05°N 82.20°E. It is at an elevation of 394 m. Waidhan is 50 km away from Sarai.

Sarai has a railway station with the Katni–Singrauli line passing through Sarai.
