= Chitrangi, Madhya Pradesh =

Location in Madhya Pradesh, India

Chitrangi
- Tehsil
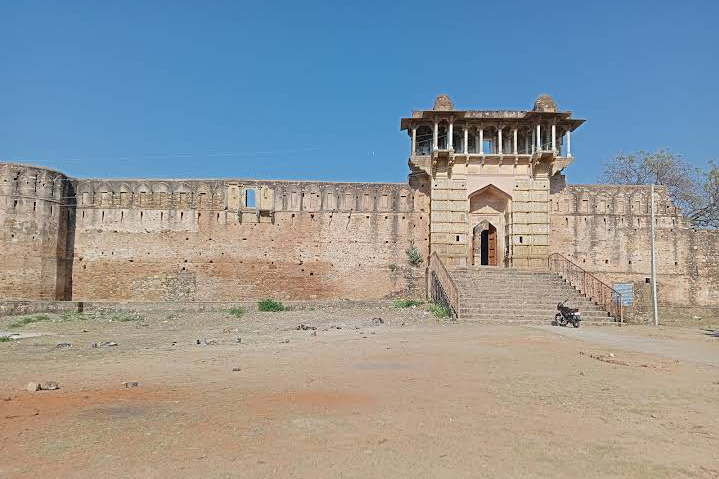
- Fort of Wardi

- Location in Madhya Pradesh Chitrangi (India)
- Coordinates: 24.474275°N 82.546955°E
- Country: India
- State: Madhya Pradesh
- District: Singrauli district

Government
  - Type: Janpad Panchayat
  - Body: Council

Languages
  - Official: Hindi
- Time zone: UTC+5:30 (IST)
- ISO 3166 code: MP-IN

Chitrangi is a tehsil and a Gram Panchayat in Singrauli district, Madhya Pradesh, India. It is also a subdivision of the administrative and revenue division of Singrauli of Madhya Pradesh.

== Demographics ==
Chitrangi Town has population of 3,805 of which 2,009 are males while 1,796 are females as per Population Census 2011.

== Governance ==
Chitrangi Assembly constituency is one of the 230 Vidhan Sabha (Legislative Assembly) constituencies of Madhya Pradesh state in central India.

== Places to Interest ==
- Fort of Wardi - Vardi Fort is situated at the confluence of Sone and Gopad rivers in Singrauli. It is a beautiful and natural place to visit.
- Rock Shelter's - Singrauli features painted rock shelters, such as those at Ranimachi, Dholagiri and Goura Pahad, situated in Chitrangi tehsil.
- Bagdara Wildlife Sanctuary - it's a wildlife sanctuary spread across the Vindhya mountain ranges and plains in Sidhi district and Singrauli District of the Indian state of Madhya Pradesh. The total area of sanctuary is 478 square kilometers, of which 231.05 square kilometers is protected forest.

== See also ==
- Chitrangi Assembly constituency
