= Essar Mahan Power Plant =

Thermal power plant near Singrauli, Madhya Pradesh, India

Coordinates: 24.199°N 82.664°E

Essar Mahan Power Plant is a coal-based thermal power plant located near Singrauli town in Singrauli district in the Indian state of Madhya Pradesh. The power plant is operated by the Essar Energy.

== Capacity ==
It has a planned capacity of 1200 MW (2x600 MW) of which 600 MW unit-1 is commissioned in December 2012 and 600 MW unit-2 commissioned in May 2017. Unit 3 was originally planned in Phase II expansion but was later shelved.

Unit No.	Generating Capacity	Commissioned on	Status
1	600 MW	2012 December	Operational
2	600 MW	2017 May	Operational
3	600 MW		Shelved
