= Deosar =

Deosar Bijaura
- Location within Madhya Pradesh
- Coordinates: 24°19′05″N 82°18′25″E
- Country: India
- State: Madhya Pradesh
- District: Singrauli
- Elevation: 392 m (1,286 ft)

Languages
  - Official: Hindi, Bagheli, English", Bagheli is local language of here
- Time zone: UTC+5:30 (IST)
- PIN: 486881
- Telephone code: 07801
- Vehicle registration: MP-66
- Website: www.singrauli.nic.in

Deosar (Devsar) is a town and tehsil in the Singrauli district, Madhya Pradesh, India. It is also an industrial hub. Deosar Tehsil is located on N.H. 39. It is also a Madhya Pradesh Legislative Assembly, part of the Sidhi Lok Sabha constituency.

Deosar belongs to Rewa Division. It is located 55 km west of the district headquarters of Singrauli and 592 km from the state capital of Bhopal towards the east. Deosar Tehsil is bounded by Sihawal Tehsil to the north, Chitrangi Tehsil towards the east, Sidhi Tehsil on the west, and Singrauli Tehsil to the east.

== History ==
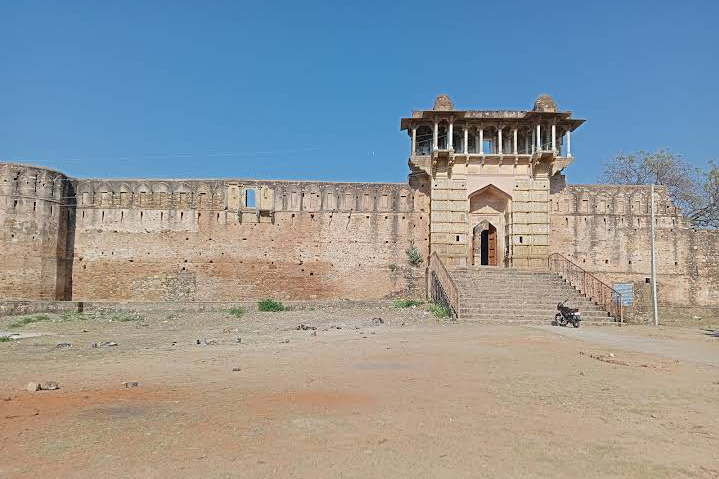
Fort of Bardi

Previously it was a part of Singrauli State which was ruled by the Venvanshi Maharajas. Until 2008, it was part of the Sidhi district which was bifurcated to create Singrauli district tehsils, Singrauli, Chitrangi, and Deosar but in 2012, two new tehsils Sarai and Mada were added. It is also known as Bijaura District. Its headquarters is approximately 50 km from Deosar, which has road connectivity.

== Geography ==
Sidhi, Singrauli, Rewa, Renukoot are the nearby cities to Deosar. It is at an elevation of 394 m. Vindhyachal, Rewa, mada caves, Allahabad, Varanasi (Benares) are the nearby important tourist destinations.

== Demographics ==
Ganesh temple, Khadaura Deosar
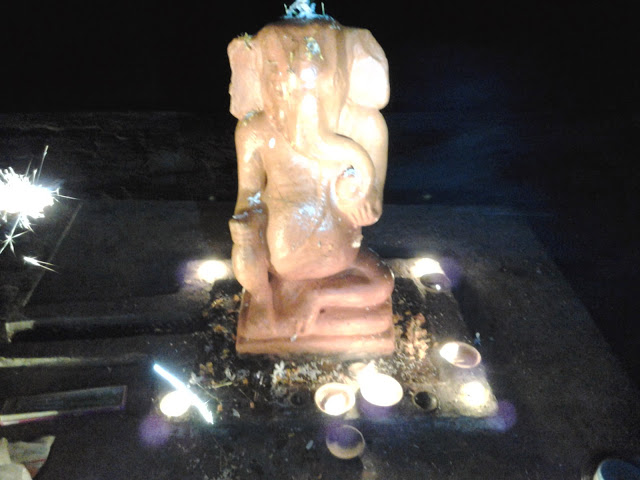

Religion
- Affiliation: Hinduism

Location
- Interactive map of Ganesh temple, Khadaura Deosar

Bagheli is the local language. People also speak Hindi and English.

Total population of Deosar Tehsil is 324,363 living in 45,840 houses, spread across a total 225 villages and 98 panchayats. Males are 170,347 and females are 154,016.

Education in Deosar consists of a Government Degree College, Government Girls Higher Secondary School, Government Higher Secondary School in Khadaura, Government Excellence school, Government Model school and Saraswati higher secondary school Deosar.

== Tourism ==
Deosar has several locations of interest for tourists. These include Ganesh Mandir Khadaura, Shiv Mandir, Dahran Sahuar, Chhiwa Shiv Mandir and Bainakund Temple.
