= Northern Coalfields Limited =

Coal-mining company in India

Northern Coalfields Limited (NCL)
- Company type: Public sector undertakings(PSU)
- Industry: Coal Mining
- Founded: 1985
- Headquarters: Singrauli, Madhya Pradesh, India
- Area served: India
- Key people: Manish Kumar (Chairman and managing director (CMD))
- Owner: Government of India
- Website: www.nclcil.in

Northern Coalfields Limited (NCL) is a coal-producing company in India and a wholly owned subsidiary of Coal India Limited (CIL), operating under the Ministry of Coal, Government of India.

== History ==
The company was established in 1985 and is headquartered in Singrauli, Madhya Pradesh. NCL operates ten mechanized opencast coal mines in the Singrauli coalfield. In April 2020, NCL recorded a 26.22% increase in coal production and an 18% rise in coal dispatch compared to the previous year. During the month, the company produced 10.81 million tonnes.

In 2021, the company produced 122 million tonnes of coal and removed 410 million cubic meters of overburden. A total of 125 million tonnes of coal were dispatched, with 110.6 million tonnes supplied to power plants.

In September 2021, NCL partnered with NTPC Limited to develop a 50 MW solar power project in Madhya Pradesh.

On March 23, 2025, NCL published the merit list for its apprentice recruitment program, listing 1,765 vacancies for Graduate, Diploma, and Trade Apprentices.

== Investigations ==
In August 2024, the CBI arrested five individuals, including two senior officials of NCL, in connection with a bribery and corruption case in Singrauli. The investigation resulted in the recovery of approximately Rs. 4 Crore, or 480480.48 US dollars in cash from the residence of Subedar Ojha, who was serving as Manager (Secretariat) and Personal Secretary to the Chairman and Managing Director (CMD) of NCL. The case is currently under judicial review.
