= Singrauli Coalfield =

Mine in Madhya Pradesh and Uttar Pradesh, India

Northern Coalfields Limited
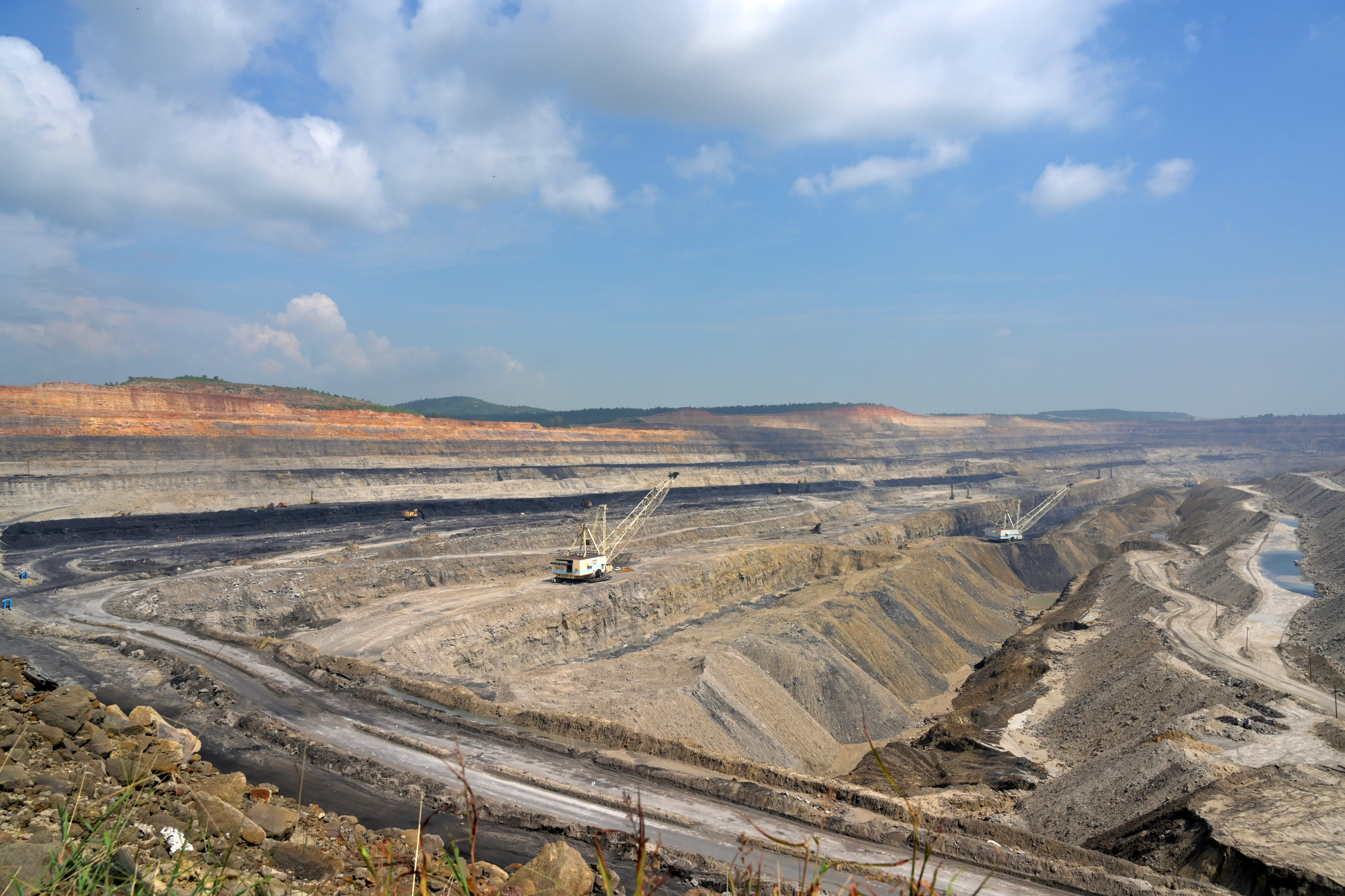

- Location within India
- Location: Singrauli, Madhya Pradesh, Uttar Pradesh, India; 24°10′30″N 82°45′18″E
- Company: Northern Coalfields Limited
- Website: http://ncl.gov.in/
- Acquired: 1986

Singrauli Coalfield is spread across the districts of Singrauli and Sonebhadra in the Indian states of Madhya Pradesh and Uttar Pradesh, mostly in the basin of the Son River.

== The Coalfield ==
The Singrauli Coalfield is located between latitudes 24^{0}12^{’} N and 23^{0} 47^{’} N. It is spread over nearly 2,200 km^{2} (850 sq mi) but only a small part of the coalfield, around 220 km^{2} (85 sq mi), has been identified as promising by the Geological Survey of India. The north-eastern part of the coalfield sits on a plateau with an altitude of 500m above mean sea level, well above the lower plains of 280m altitude.

The coal reserves in the north-eastern part of Singrauli coalfield, covering an area of around 220 km^{2} (85 sq mi), is 9,121 million tonnes, out of which 2,724 million tonnes are proved reserves and the rest is inferred or indicated. Important coal seams in this part of Singrauli coalfield are: Jhingurda (130–162 m thick), Purewa (8–25 m thick) and Turra (12–22 m thick). Qualitatively, the products of these seams are generally high moisture (6-9 per cent) and high ash (17-40 per cent) coals. The volatile matter ranges from 25-30 per cent. The calorific value of the coal varies from 4,200-5,900 Kcal/kg.

Almost all of India’s coal reserves are of Gondwana coal. Thickness of coal seams in Indian coalfields generally range from 1 m to 30 m. An exceptionally thick seam of 138 m has been discovered in Singrauli coalfield.

== Operations ==
Singrauli Coalfield is divided into two parts by the Kachani River - Muher sub-basin and Singrauli main basin. Major part of the Muher sub-basin lies in the Singrauli district of Madhya Pradesh and a small part lies in the Sonebhadra district of Uttar Pradesh. Singrauli main basin lies in the western and southern parts of the coalfield and is largely unexplored. The present coal mining activities and future blocks are concentrated in Moher sub-basin.

Although some sporadic mining by private companies took place from early days, large scale and systematic mining was initiated in the Moher sub-basin by NCDC in the early sixties. A master plan for the Moher basin was prepared by the P&D Division of NCDC, in consultation with Soviet experts. The master plan envisaged large mechanized open cast mines.

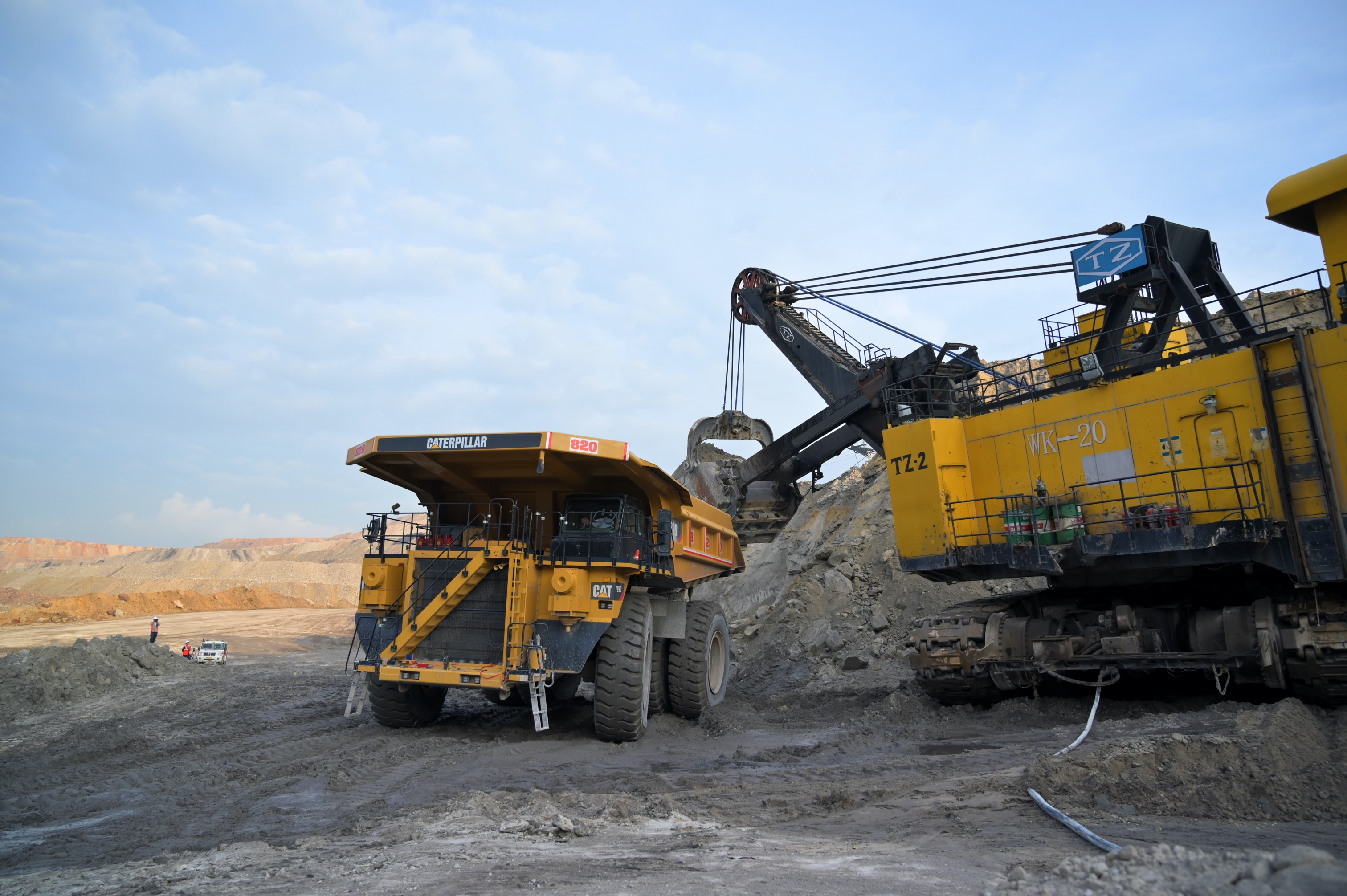
Shovel Dumper combination

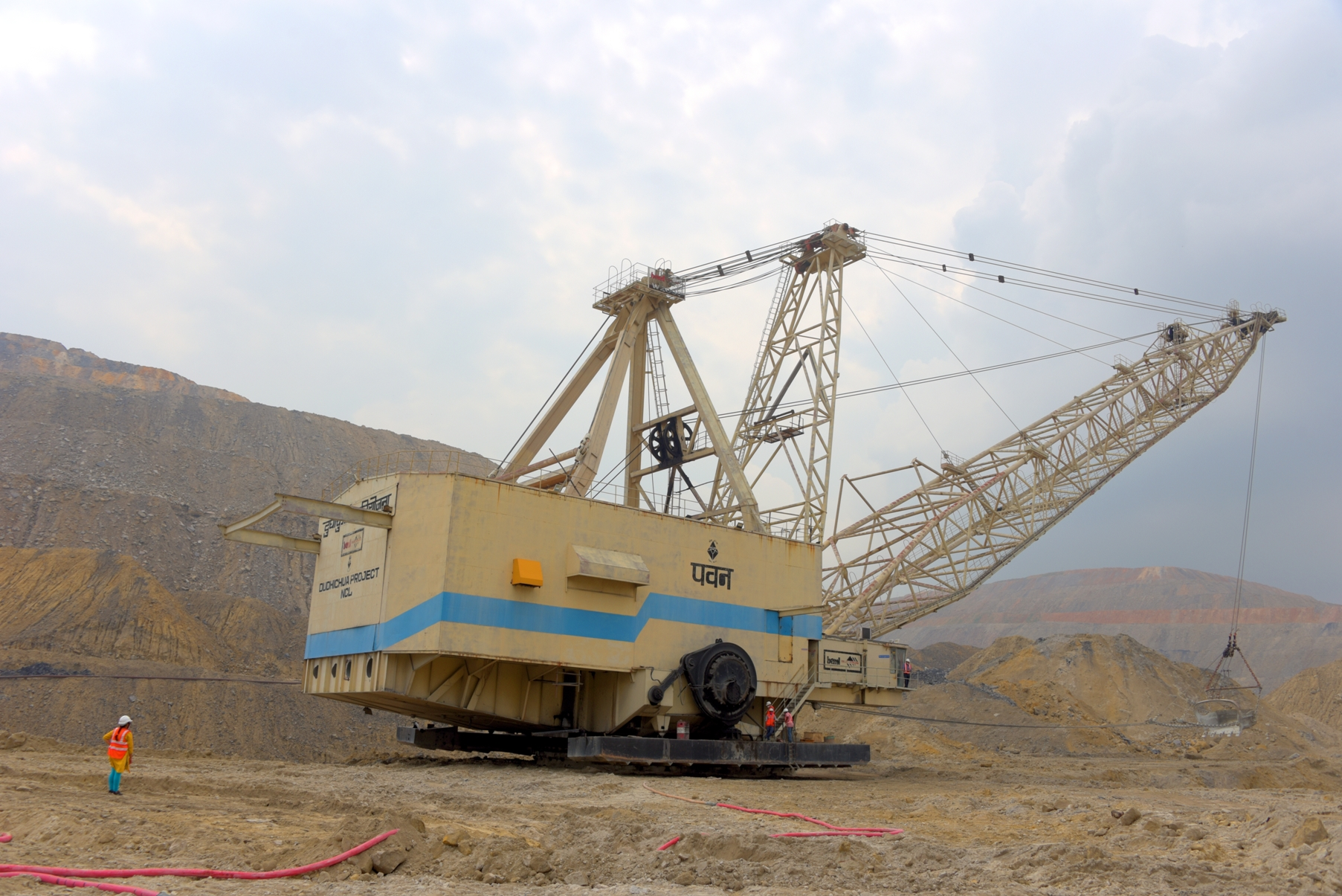
Dragline at Dudhichua Coal Mine Singrauli

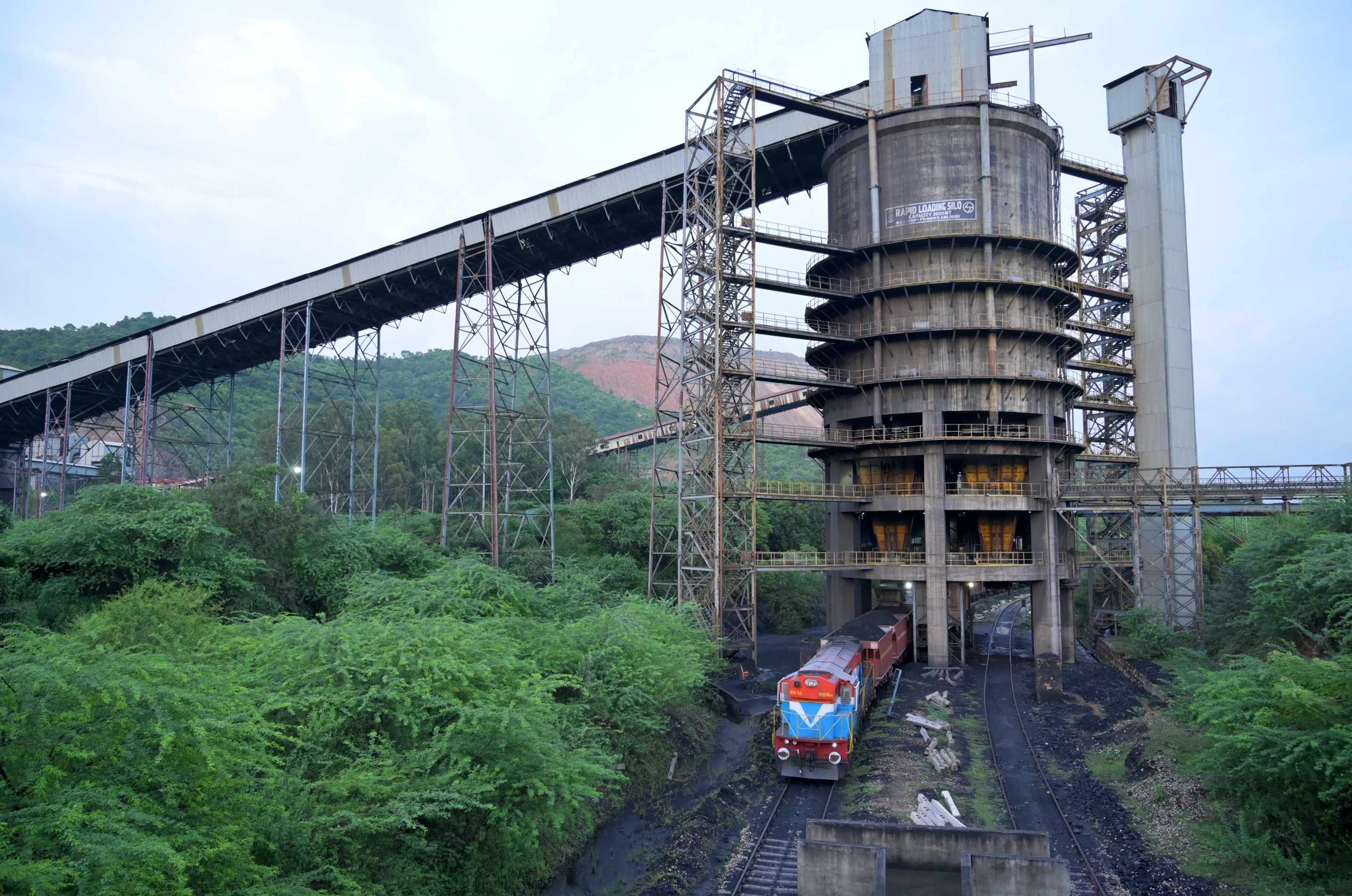
Silo rake loading at NCL Amlohri Coal Mine at Singrauli

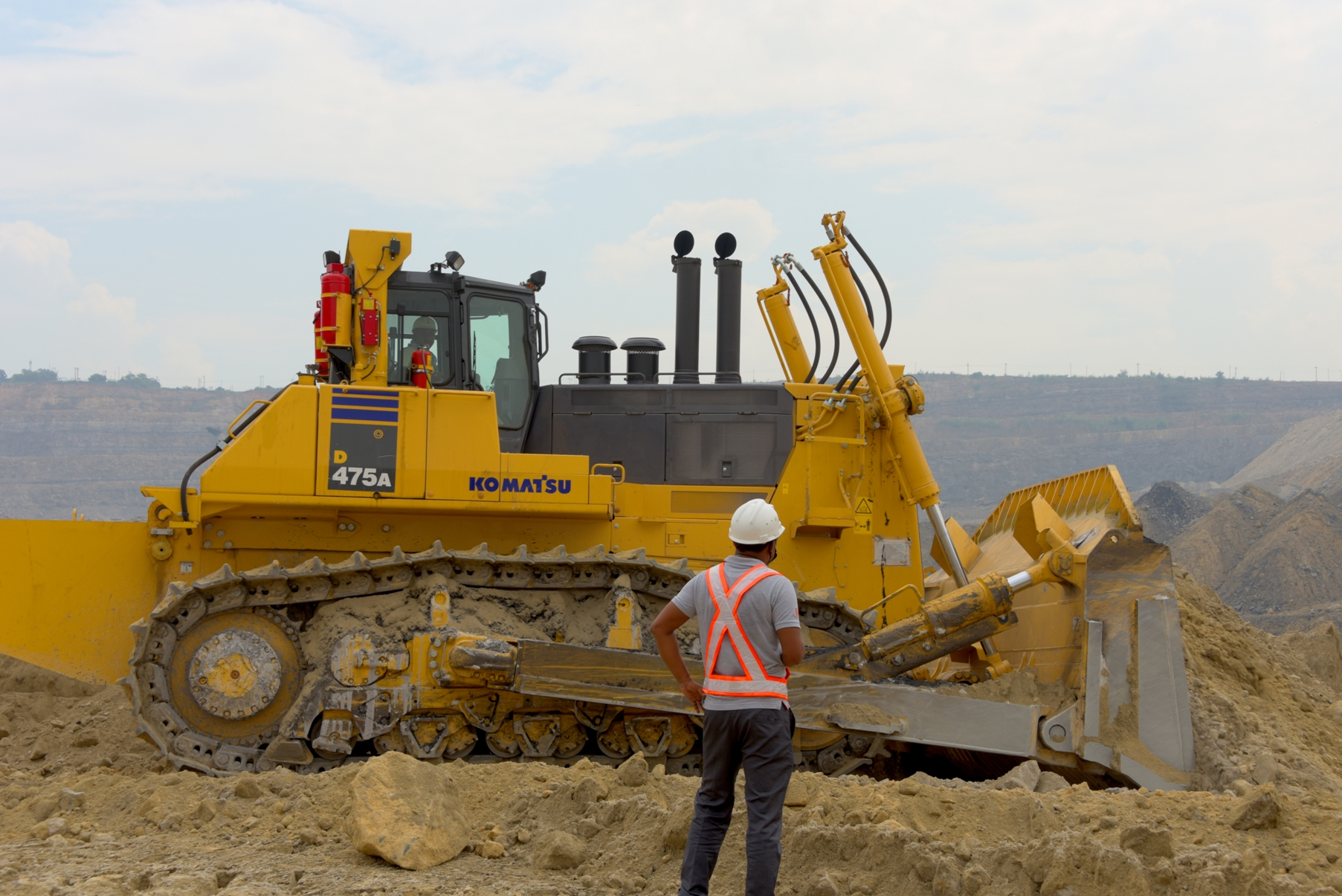
Dozer at Dudhichua Coal Mine

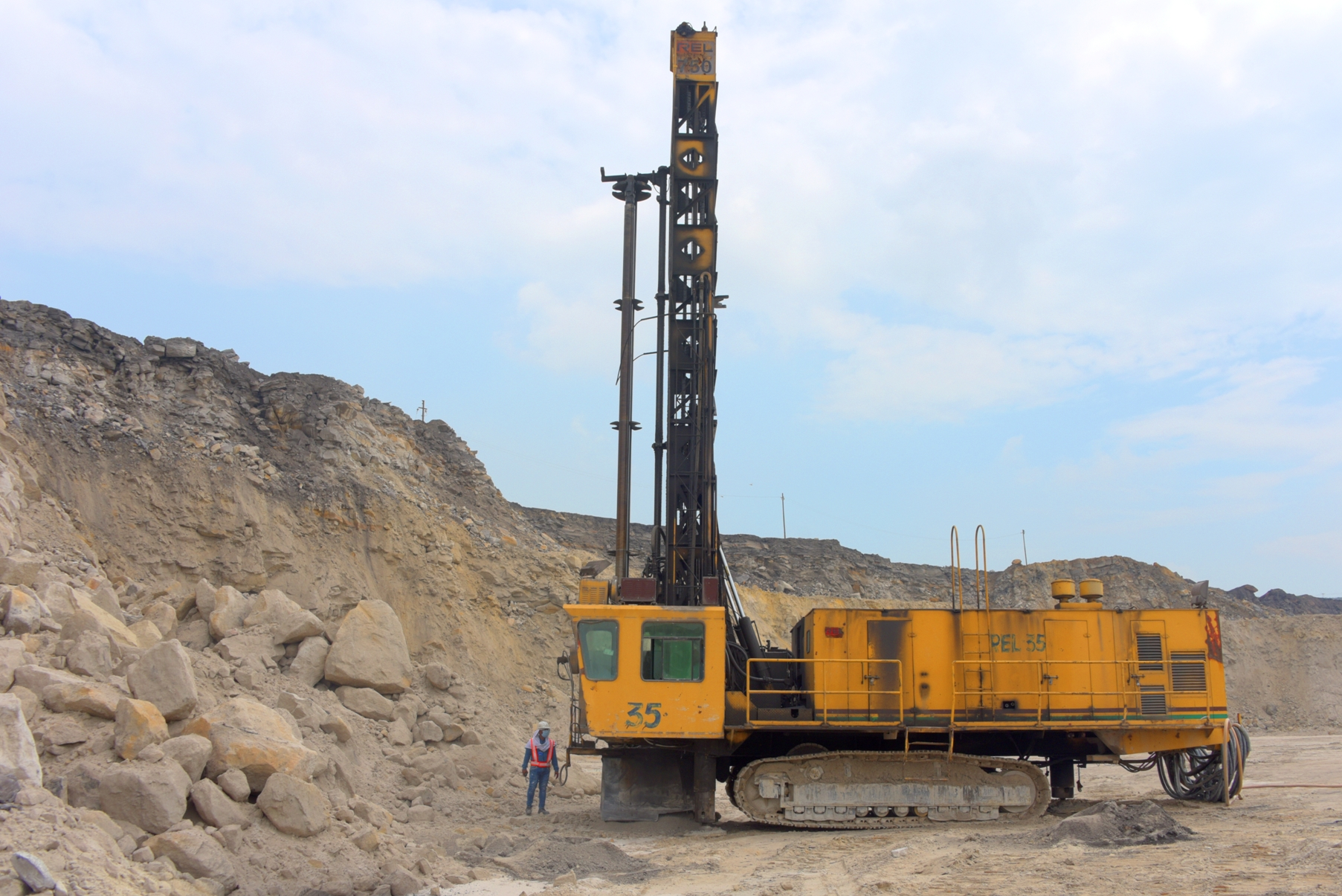
Mining Drill at Dudhichua Coal Mine

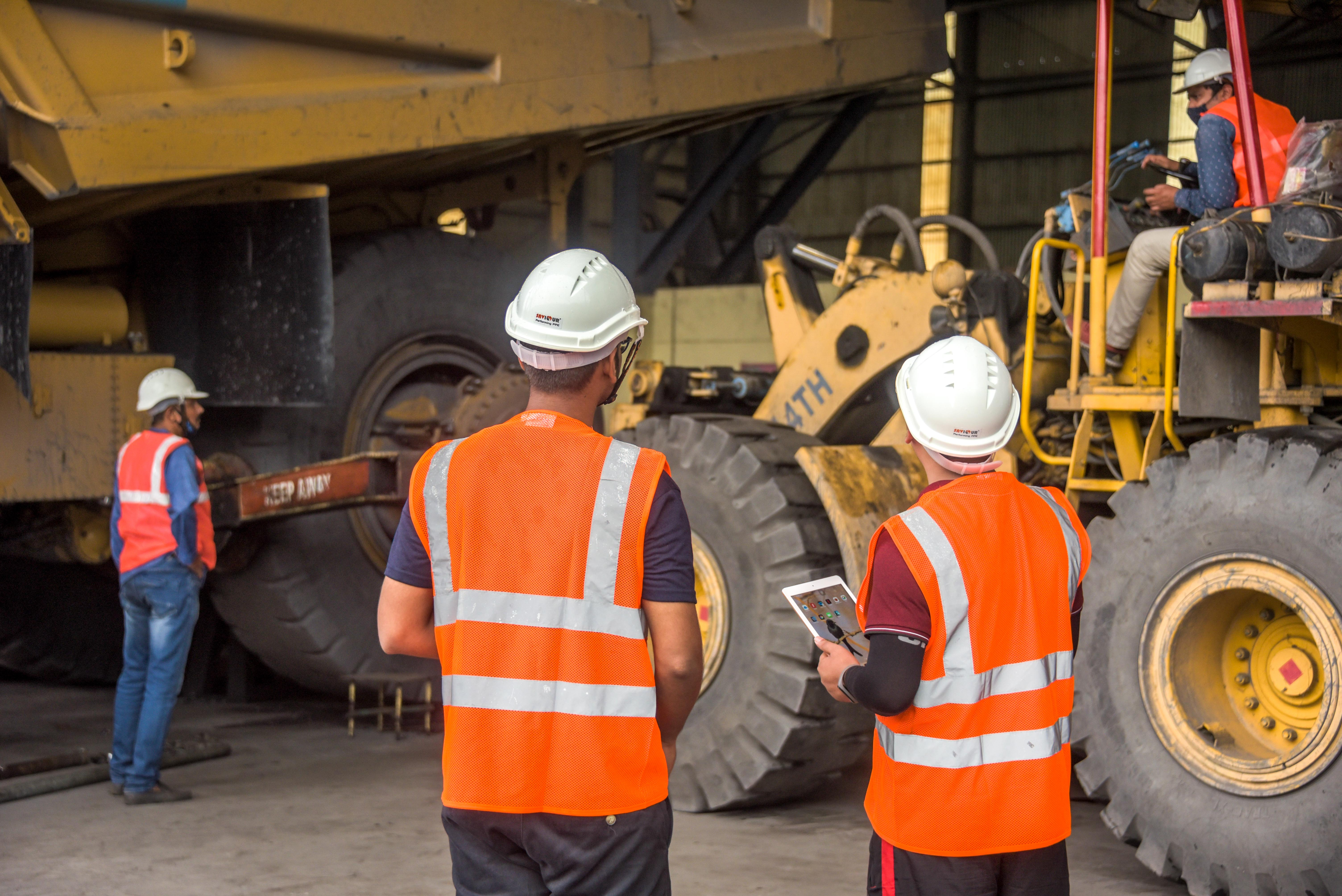
Krishnashila Workshop with miners

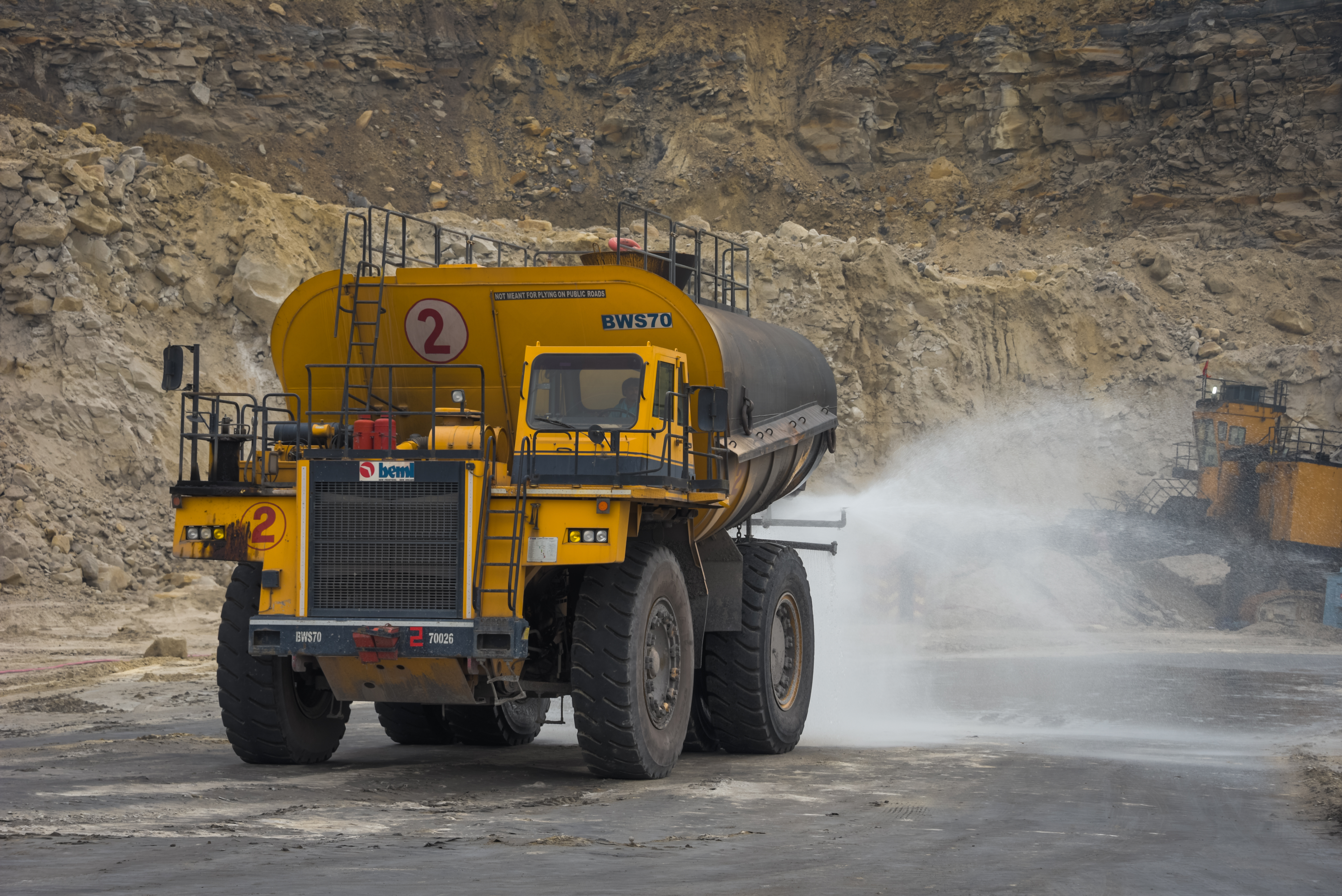
NCL Singrauli Dudhichua Water Sprinkler

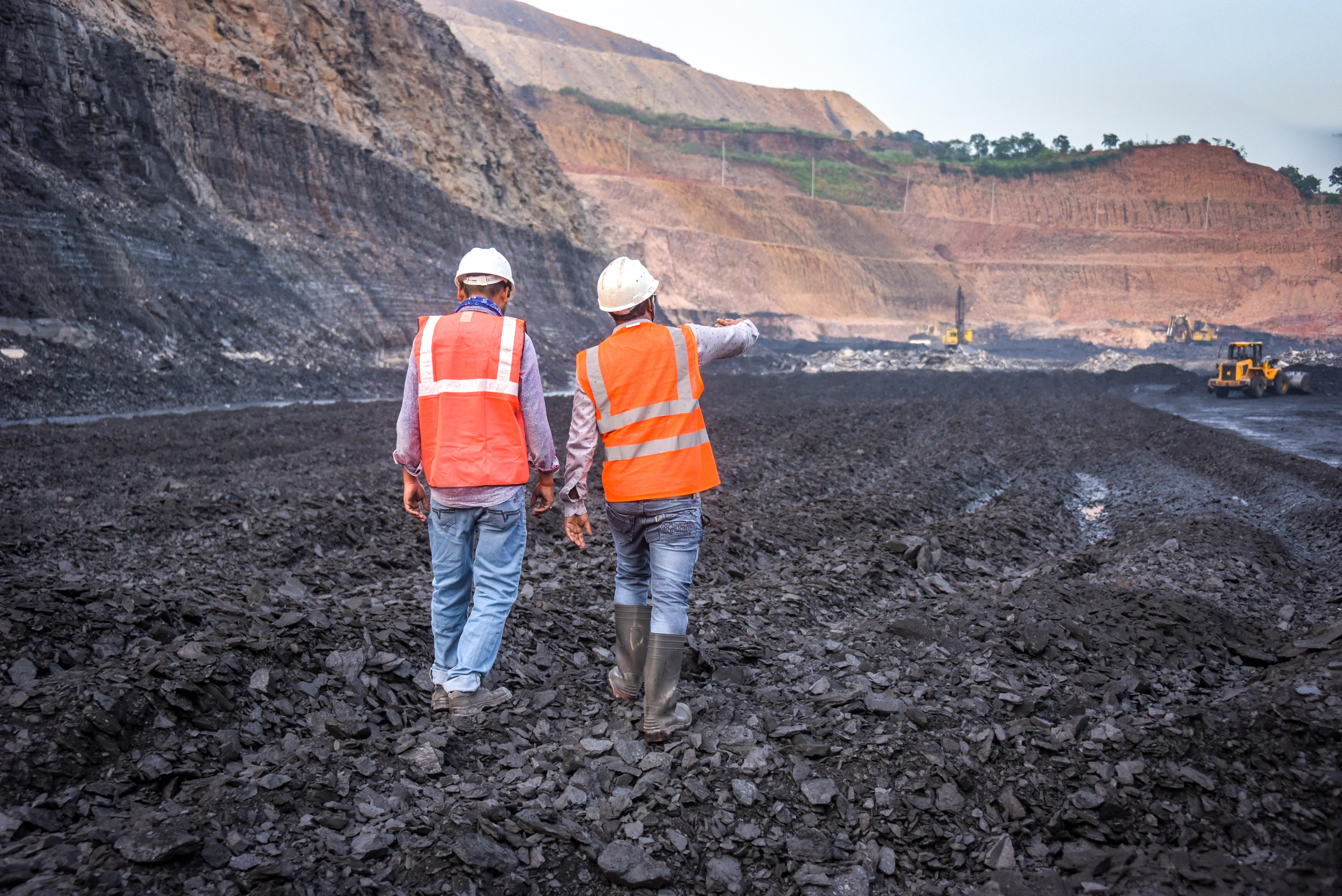
Miner Walking on Coal face in NCL Krishnashila Mine

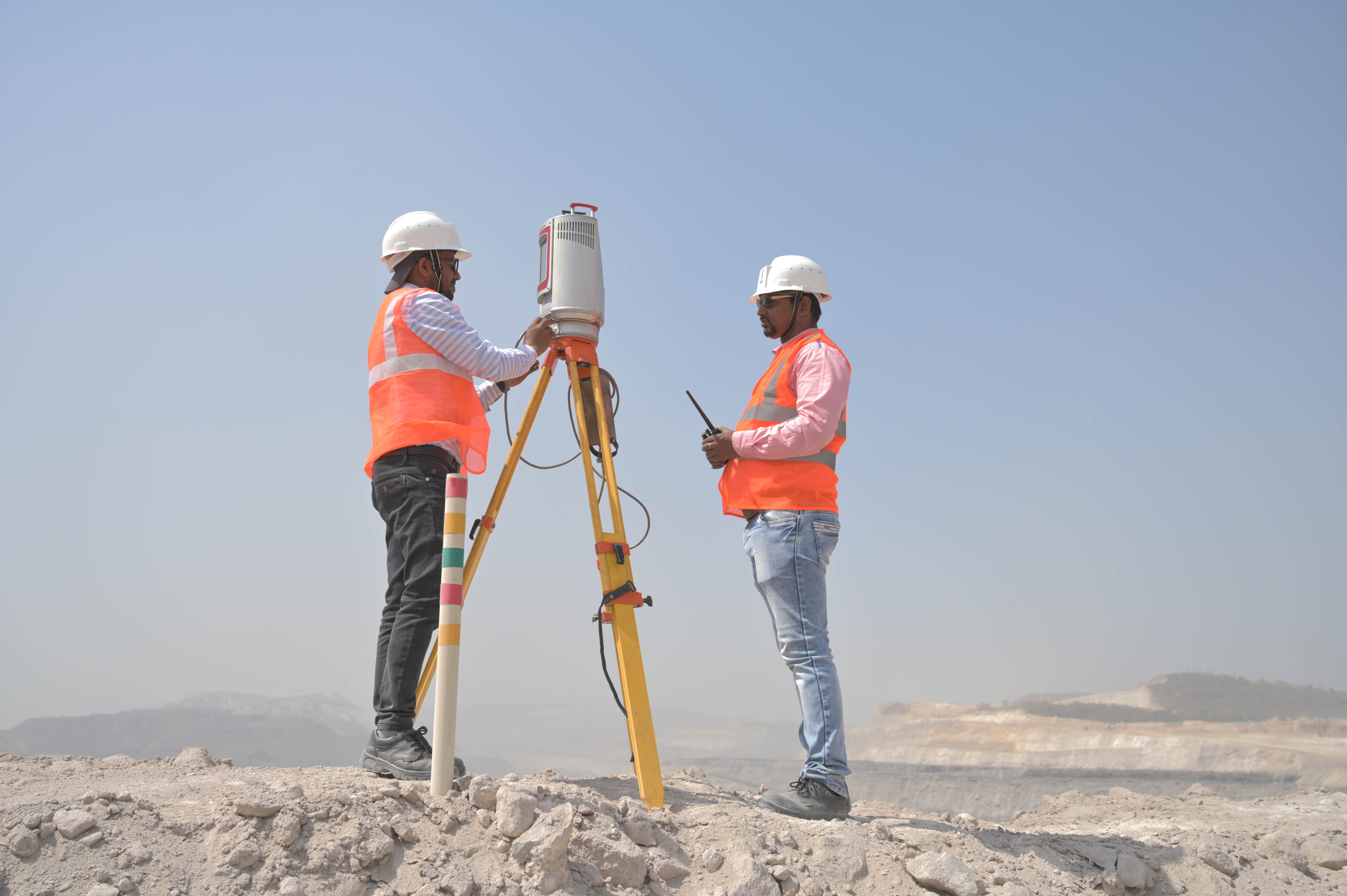
3D Scanner for Coal Mining at Khadia NCL

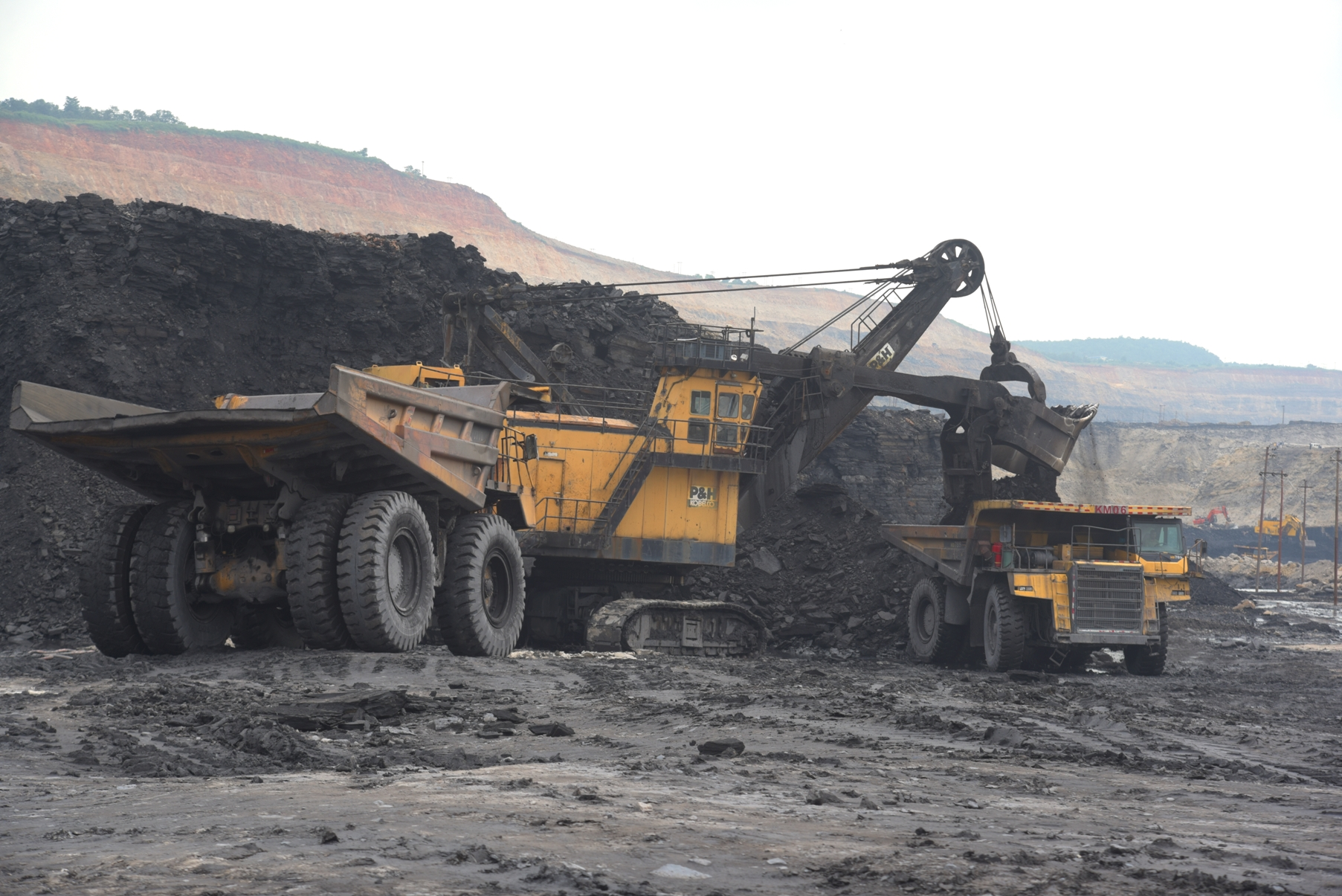
Shovel dumper combination at Dudhichua Coal Mine Singrauli

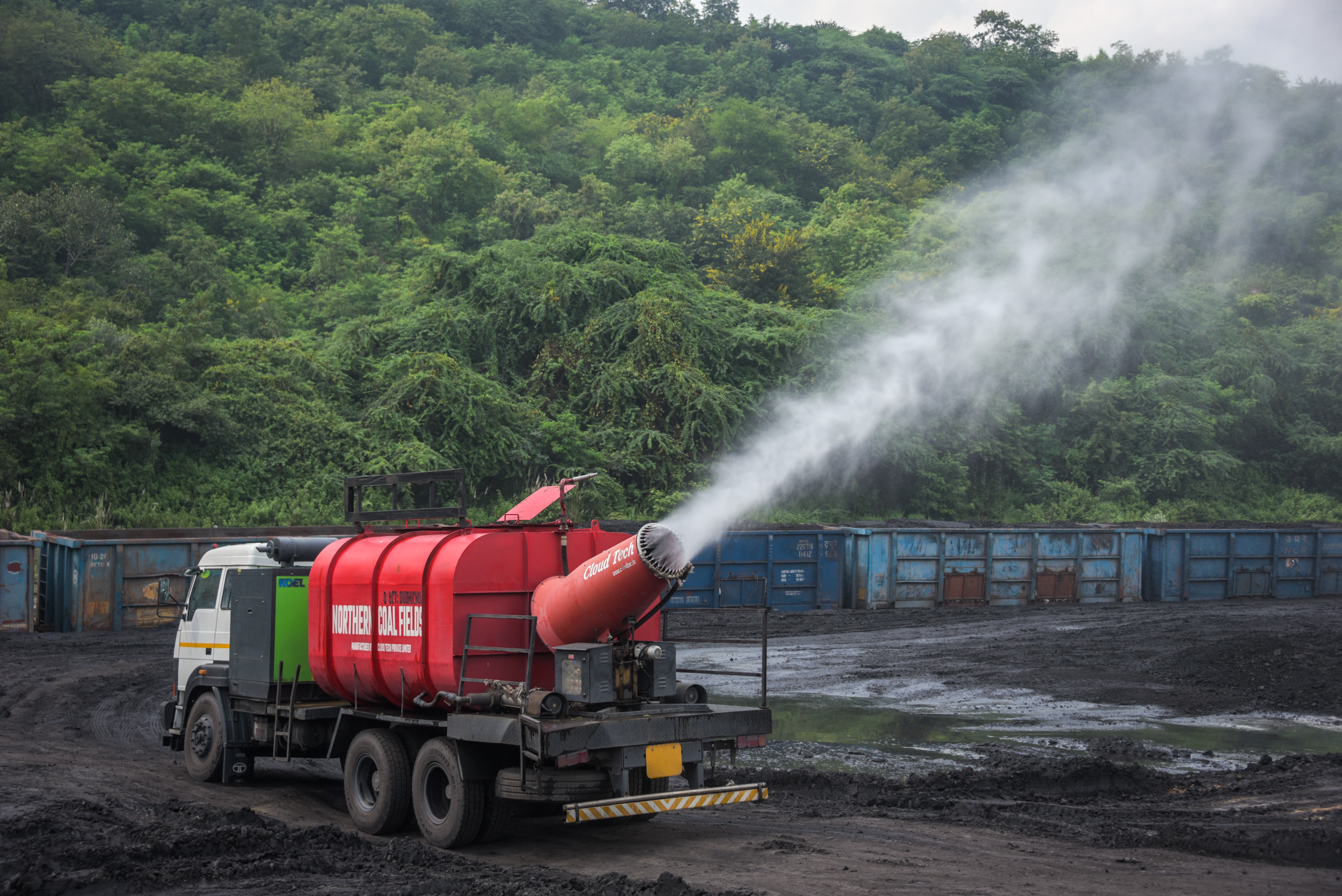
NCL Mine Dudhichua Mist Spray

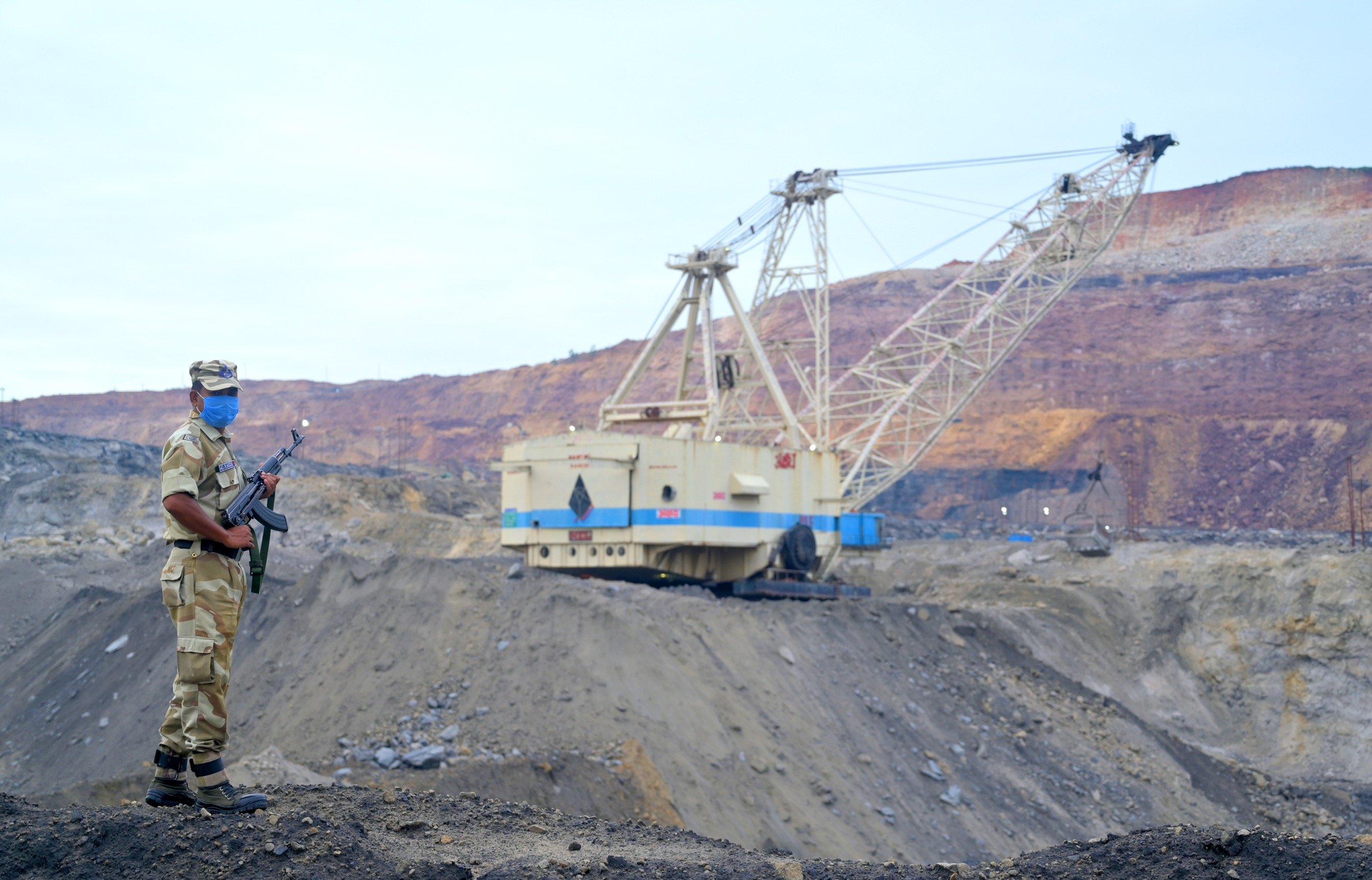
CISF at NCL Amlohri Mine

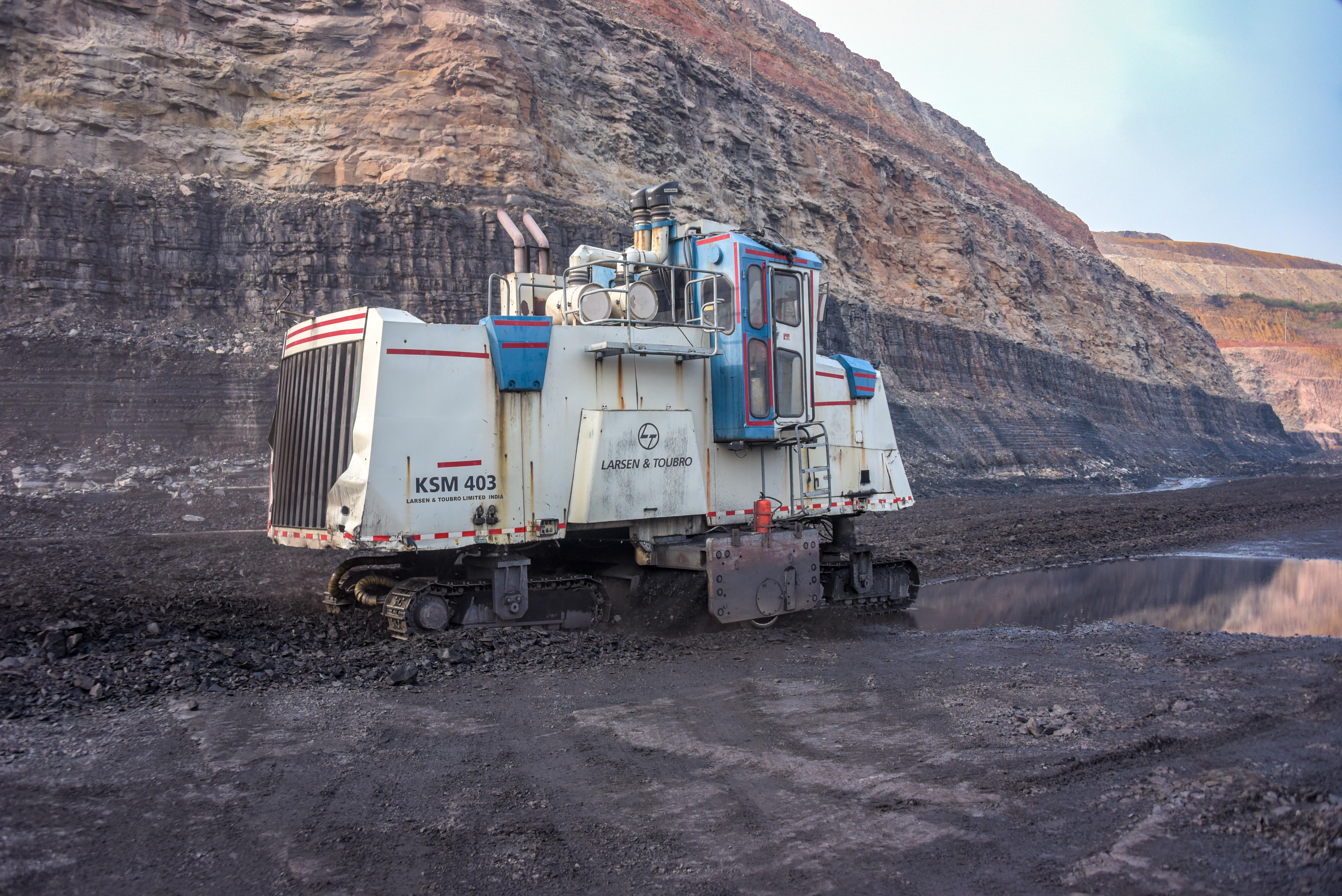
Surface Minier Krishnashila Coal Mine

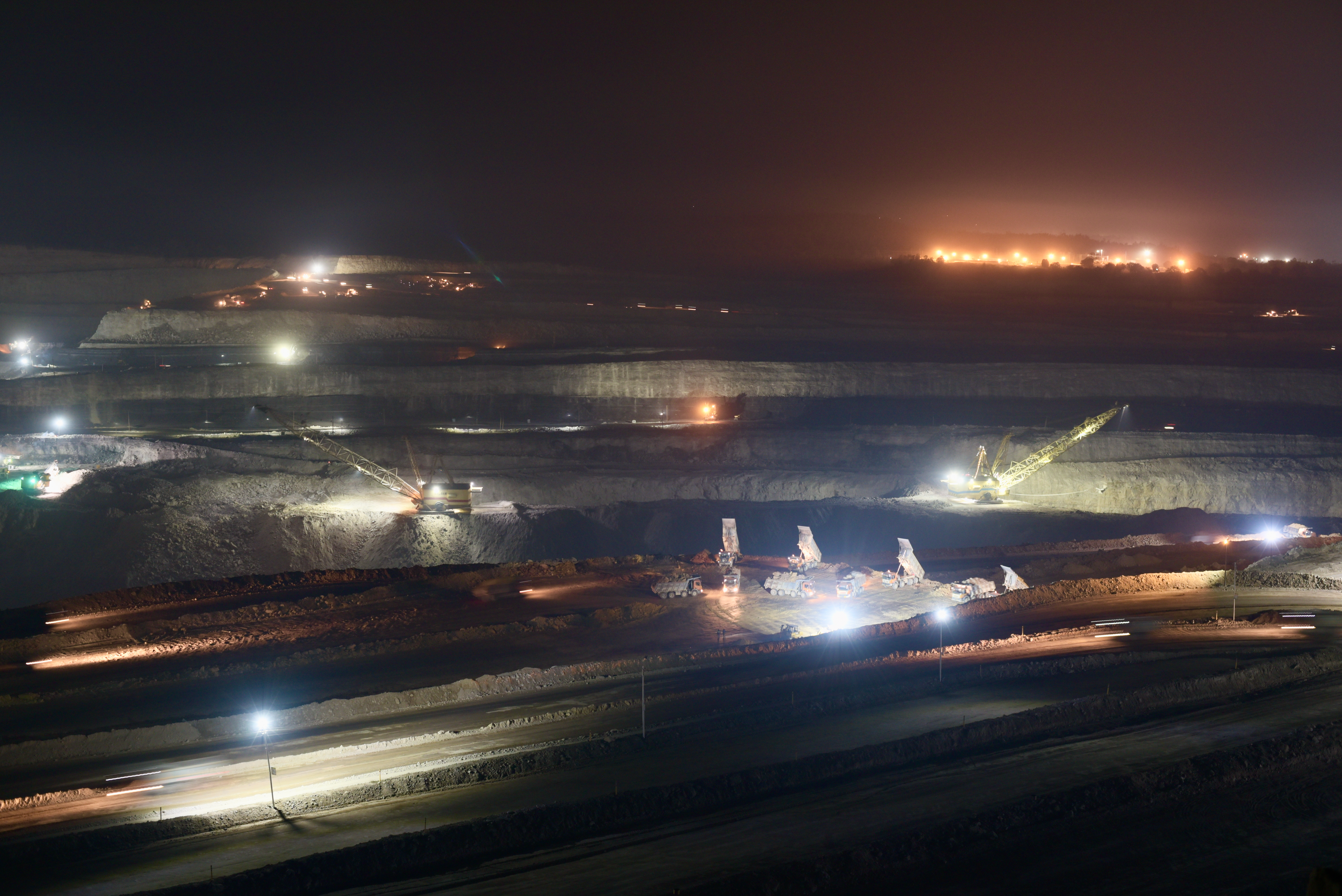
NCL Singrauli Nigahi Coal Mine at Night

Northern Coalfields Limited was carved out of Central Coalfields Limited in 1986, to take care of operations in the Singrauli Coalfield. The proved reserves in the Moher basin are about 3 billion tonnes out of which 2.3 billion tonnes have already been planned for mining, in an area of about 84 km^{2} (32 sq mi). During 2010-11, coal production of Northern Coalfield Limited was 66.253 million tonnes.

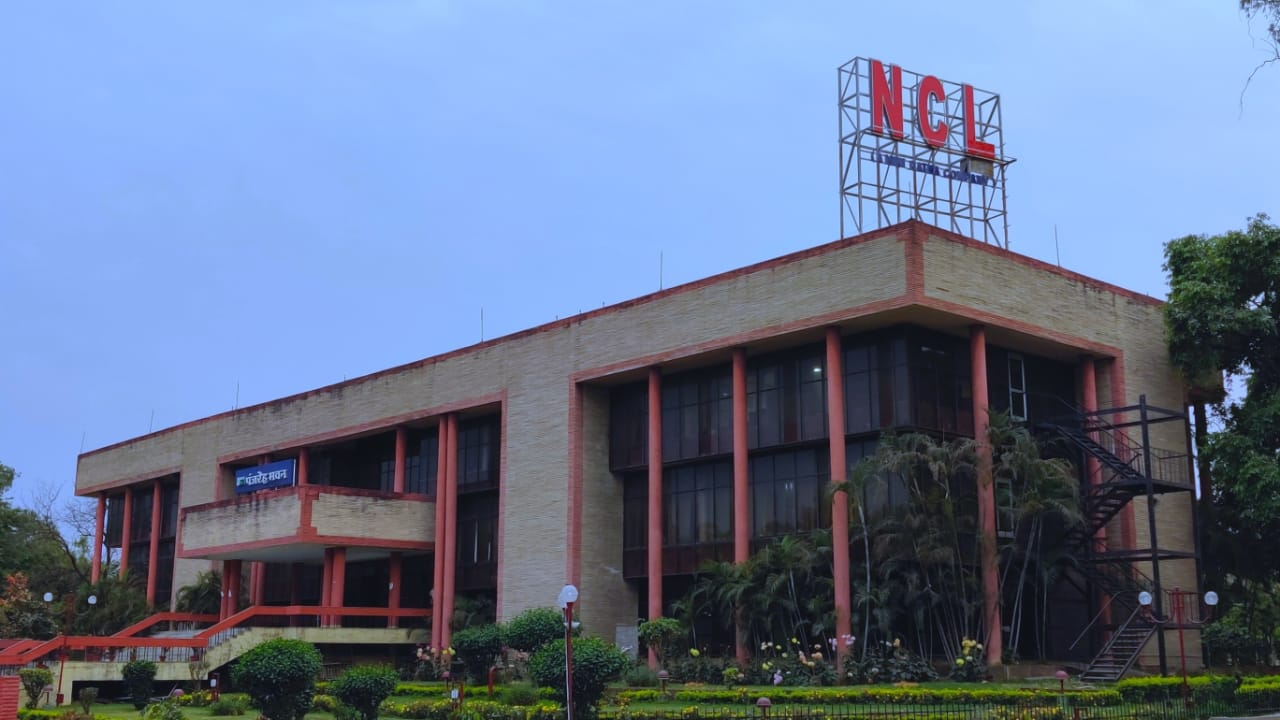
NCL Singrauli Headquarters

== Power plants ==
Most of the coal produced from Northern Coalfields Limited is dispatched to pithead power plants. Some of the power plants in the area are: Singrauli Super Thermal Power Station, Rihand Thermal Power Station, Anpara Thermal Power Station, Obra Thermal Power Station, Vindhyachal Thermal Power Station and Renusagar Thermal Power Plant.

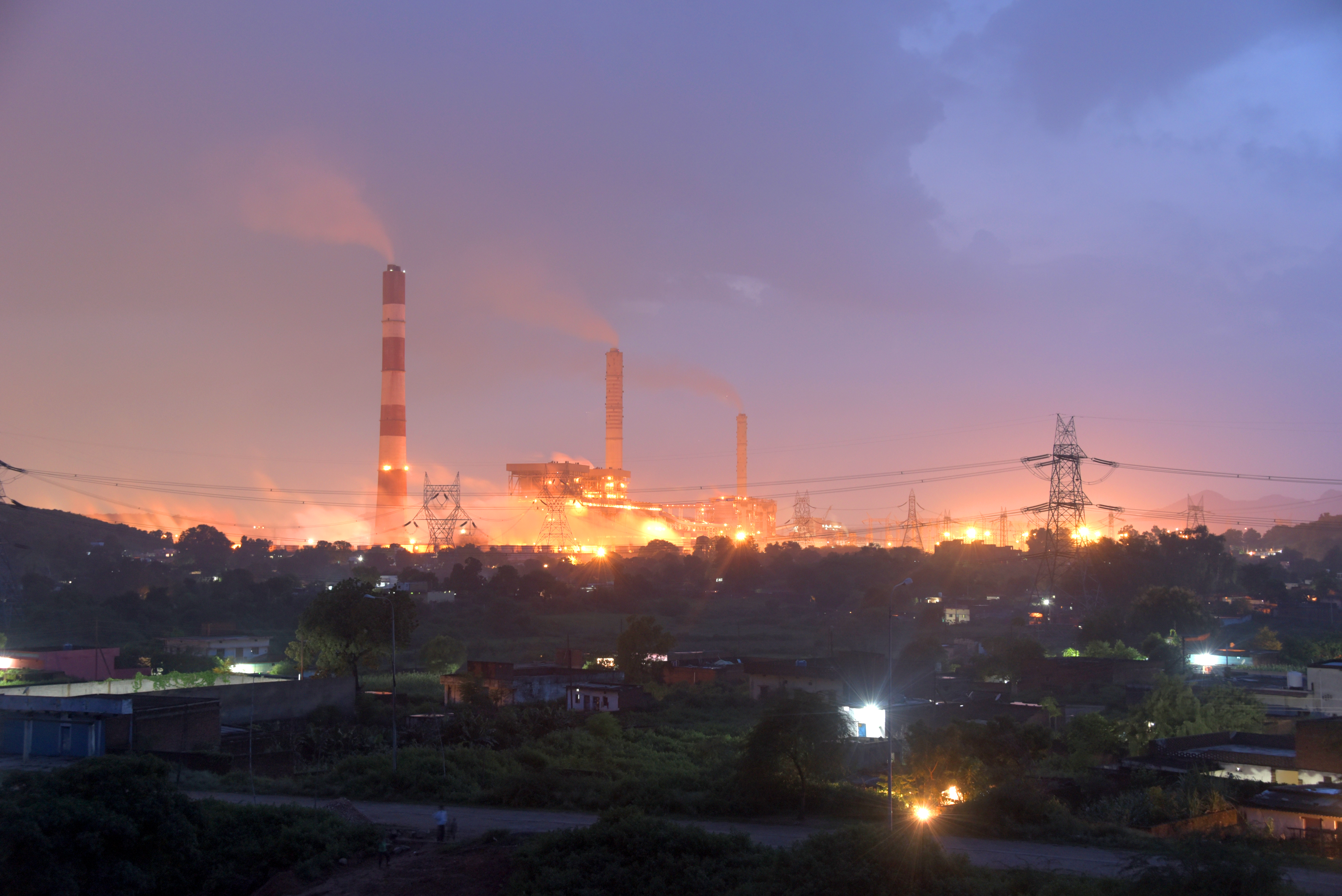
POWER Plant at Night in Singrauli

== Recruitment ==
1. Official Updates
2. Northern Coalfields Ltd Recruitment 2020 -
