= Bagdara Wildlife Sanctuary =

Wildlife sanctuary in India

- IUCN category IV (habitat/species management area)
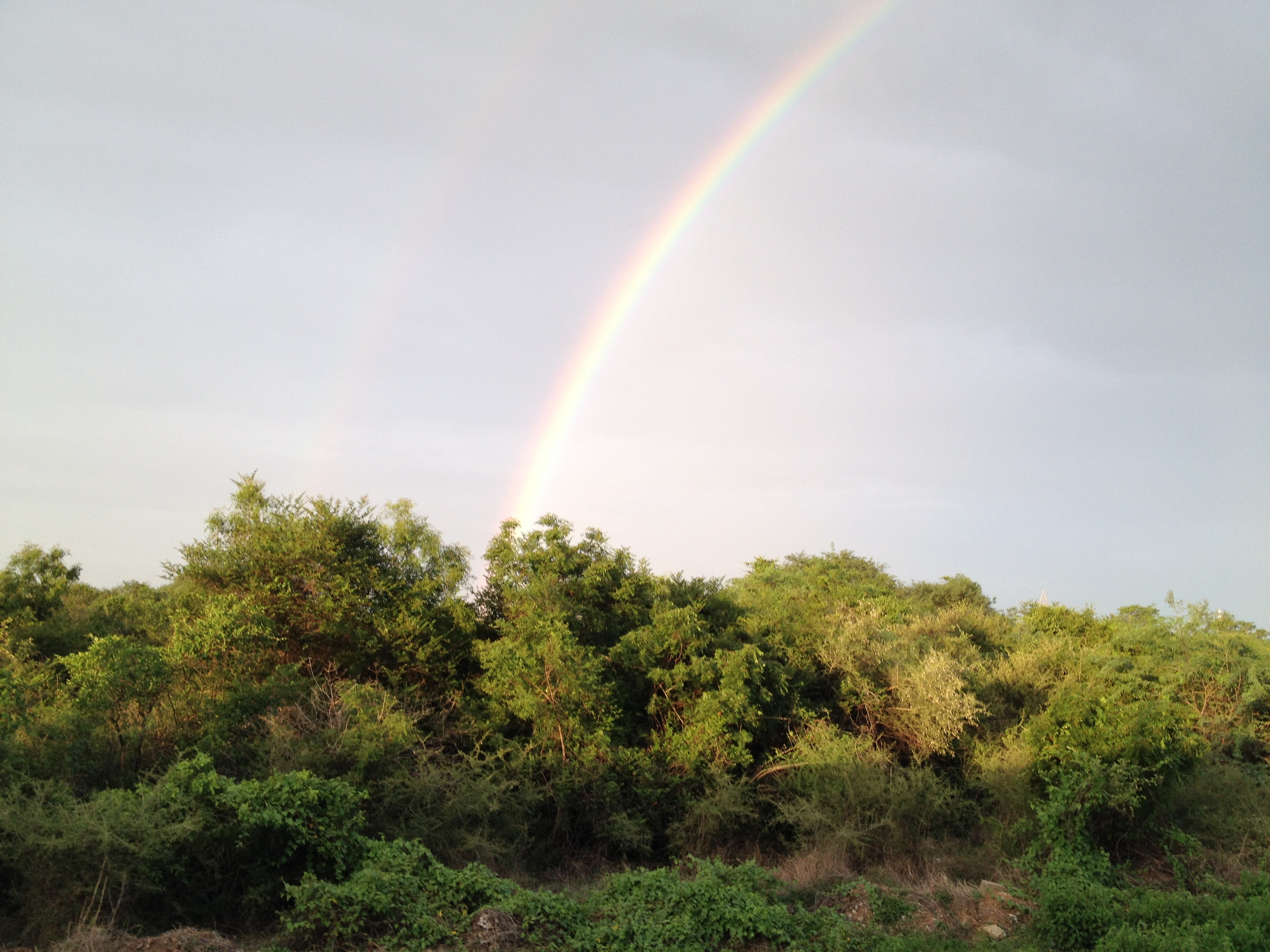
- Bagdara Wildlife Sanctuary

- Location within Madhya Pradesh
- Interactive map of Bagdara Wildlife Sanctuary
- Location: Sidhi and Singrauli districts Madhya Pradesh, India
- Coordinates: 24.633800°N 82.495970°E
- Area: 478 km^{2} (185 sq mi)
- Established: 1978
- Governing body: Government of Madhya Pradesh

Bagdara Wildlife Sanctuary is a wildlife sanctuary located in Singrauli District and Sidhi district of the Indian state of Madhya Pradesh.

== Overview ==
Bagdara Wildlife Sanctuary is a wildlife sanctuary spread across the Vindhya mountain ranges and plains in Singrauli district of the Indian state of Madhya Pradesh. The total area of sanctuary is 478 square kilometers, of which 231.05 square kilometers is protected forest. The Belan River flows through the boundaries of Bagdara and Kaimur wildlife sanctuaries on the northern side of the sanctuary, while the Sone River forms the southern boundary. The wildlife sanctuary is bordered by the districts of Mirzapur (north, west) and Sonbhadra (north, east) of Uttar Pradesh, and Rewa district of Madhya Pradesh (west).

The wildlife sanctuary area, except for the protected forest area, is inhabited. Villages like Bagdara revenue village, Bichhi, etc. are located inside the sanctuary. Total human population inside the sanctuary is 20,107. Tribal communities such as Gonds, Kols, and Baigas live here.

== Origin of name ==
The word "Bagdara", which literally means "home of tigers", is a combination of the words "bag" meaning tiger and "dara" meaning house.

== Flora and fauna ==
83 species belonging to 72 genera and 34 angiosperm families were recorded from the mixed deciduous forest of the Bagdara Wildlife Sanctuary. Species like Boswellia serrata, Adina cordifolia, Madhuca longifolia, Butea monosperma, Senegalia catechu and Woodfordia fruticosa are found here. Other than Bengal tigers, sanctuary is also home to animals like Indian leopard, Asian elephant, Himalayan black bear, Indian wolf, blackbuck, nilgai, chinkara, sambar deer, chital, hyena, jackal, Bengal fox, colobinae and sloth bear.

== History ==
Bagdara Wildlife Sanctuary was established in 1978. Recognizing the need to protect tigers and their natural habitat, the Indian government selected this area, one of the major tiger habitats in Madhya Pradesh, to be a wildlife sanctuary.

== To reach here ==
Although located in Madhya Pradesh state, the sanctuary is in the border with Uttar Pradesh and the nearest town and railway station is Mirzapur in Uttar Pradesh and nearest airport is Varanasi in Uttar Pradesh.
