= Rihand Nagar =

Township in Uttar Pradesh, India

Rihand Nagar is a township, named after the Rihand River, a tributary of the Sone River. It is located near Bijpur and lies in the Sonebhadra district of Uttar Pradesh. This township is situated near the border of Uttar Pradesh and Madhya Pradesh in India. This township has been developed by National Thermal Power Corporation (NTPC) under its Power Project Scheme, wherein it established a coal-based power station of 3000 MW capacity.

The township, which has been developed and is maintained by NTPC, is famous for ample greenery which makes it a good place to live. The township, though located in a remote area, has a very good secondary care 50-bedded hospital with all major specialities. The hospital, in addition to the NTPC employees, also caters to the people of surrounding villages in the radius of 50 km. and runs various national health programmes with help of central government. The township's schools include DAV Public School, St Joseph's School and Kendriya Vidyalay and the coaching centre includes SSG. The main market includes Bijpur.

Educational institutions

The small township of Rihand Nagar has 4 major educational institutions namely:

- St Joseph's Senior Secondary School, Rihand Nagar
- DAV Public School, Rihand Nagar
- Kendriya Vidhyalaya, Rihand Nagar
- SSG coaching centre.

Rihand Super Thermal Power Plant

The coal based, thermal power plant, has been built in 3 stages, each with 2 units with a unit size of 500 MW.and has been awarded for efficiency on numerous occasions. The Power Plant takes its coal from Amlori and Dudhichua Mines, and water through Rihand Reservoir also known as Gobind Vallabh Pant Sagar It supplies power to the following states:

- Delhi
- Chandigarh
- Haryana
- Himachal Pradesh
- Jammu & Kashmir
- Punjab
- Rajasthan
- Uttarakhand
- Uttar Pradesh

This plant is near Vindhyanagar, Singrauli, Madhya Pradesh and Shakti Nagar, Uttar Pradesh, which also has power projects of NTPC, India.

== See also ==
- Rihand River
- Rihand Dam
