= Bijpur =

- Census town
- Location in Uttar Pradesh, India
- Coordinates: 24.041604°N 82.789364°E
- Country: India
- State: Uttar Pradesh
- District: Sonbhadra

Population (2011)
  - Total: 9,420

Languages
  - Official: Hindi
- Time zone: UTC+5:30 (IST)
- Postal code: 231223

Bijpur is a census town part of Dudhi Tehsil in Sonbhadra district in the state of Uttar Pradesh, India.It is the border town located at UP - Madhya border.

== Demographics ==
As of the 2001 Census of India, Bijpur had a population of 9232. Males constitute 53% of the population and females 47%. Bijpur has an average literacy rate of 72%, higher than the national average of 59.5%; with male literacy of 79% and female literacy of 65%. 16% of the population is under 6 years of age. Here NTPC, the largest power generation utility in India, has set up a 3000MW thermal power generation utility. The name of NTPC residential colony is Rihand Nagar. Also here is the famous Govind Vallabhpant Sagar, the backwaters of Rihand Dam in Uttar Pradesh.

== Gram Panchayat Election Bijpur 2021 ==
Gram panchayat Bijpur Election Result 2021

          Gram Pardhan 
Dasmati w/o Vishram Sagar Gupta (by 1290 vote) 

      Gram Panchayat Members

1- Geeta Pansad w/o Sagar (by 122 vote)

2- Sohan lal s/o Shiv parshad (by 133 vote)

3- Urmila w/o Vijay (by 214 vote)

4- Savita Devi w/o Ravindra Parshad (by 247 vote)

5- Daili w/o Ramgopal (by 136 vote)

6- Ravinda Parshad s/o Indradev Saha (by 60 vote)

7- Ompati w/o Ramdhan (by 27 vote)

8- Shakti Shubham Mishra s/o Sashi Bhusan (by 41 vote)

9- Anand Kumar s/o Jasvir Singh (by39 vote)

10- Abha Singh w/o Indradev Singh (by 9 vote)

11- Salma Khatoon w/o Md Meer Hasan (Without opposition)

12- Narendra s/o Ramprasad (by 11 vote)

13- Md Meer Hasan s/o Sakur Miya(Without opposition)

14- Indra Dev s/o Vishwanath (by 24 vote)

15- Parvati Devi w/o Rajkumar (by 21 vote)

 Block Development Council (B.D.C) 

1- Mevalal s/o Fulsaha (by 328 vote)

2- Ashfak Qureshi s/o Nizam Qureshi (by 160 vote)

3- Pammi Singh w/o Upendra Partap Singh (by 93 vote)

4- Kaushal s/o Bhagwan (Without opposition)

5- Vinod Kumar Rajak s/o Gopal Baitha (by 52 vote)

== Educational institutes ==
There are three CBSE based Senior Secondary schools. They are:

2) Dayanand Anglo Vedic. Sr. Sec. Public School(D. A. V. Public School, Rihand Nagar)

3) Kendriya Vidyalaya, Rihand nagar

4) St. Joseph's School

== Temples ==
1) Shiv Mandir (Rihand Nagar)
2) Hanuman Mandir (Bijpur)
3) Dudhiya Devi Mandir (Bijpur)

== Mosque ==
1) Jama Masjid (Shanti Nagar)
