= Devsar, Navsari =

Devsar
- Census town
- Location in Gujarat, India Devsar (India)
- Coordinates: 20.76533°N 72.97209°E
- Country: India
- State: Gujarat
- District: Navsari

Government
  - Type: Municipal corporation

Population (2001)
  - Total: 8,869

Languages
  - Official: Gujarati, Hindi
- Time zone: UTC+5:30 (IST)
- ISO 3166 code: IN-GJ
- Vehicle registration: GJ
- Website: gujaratindia.com

Devsar is a census town in Navsari district in the state of Gujarat, India.

== Demographics ==
At the 2001 India census, Devsar had a population of 8869. Males constituted 51% of the population and females 49%. Devsar had an average literacy rate of 80%, higher than the national average of 59.5%: male literacy was 84% and female literacy was 75%. In Devsar, 11% of the population were under 6 years of age.
