= Vindhyachal Thermal Power Station =

Coal-fired power plant in Madhya Pradesh, India

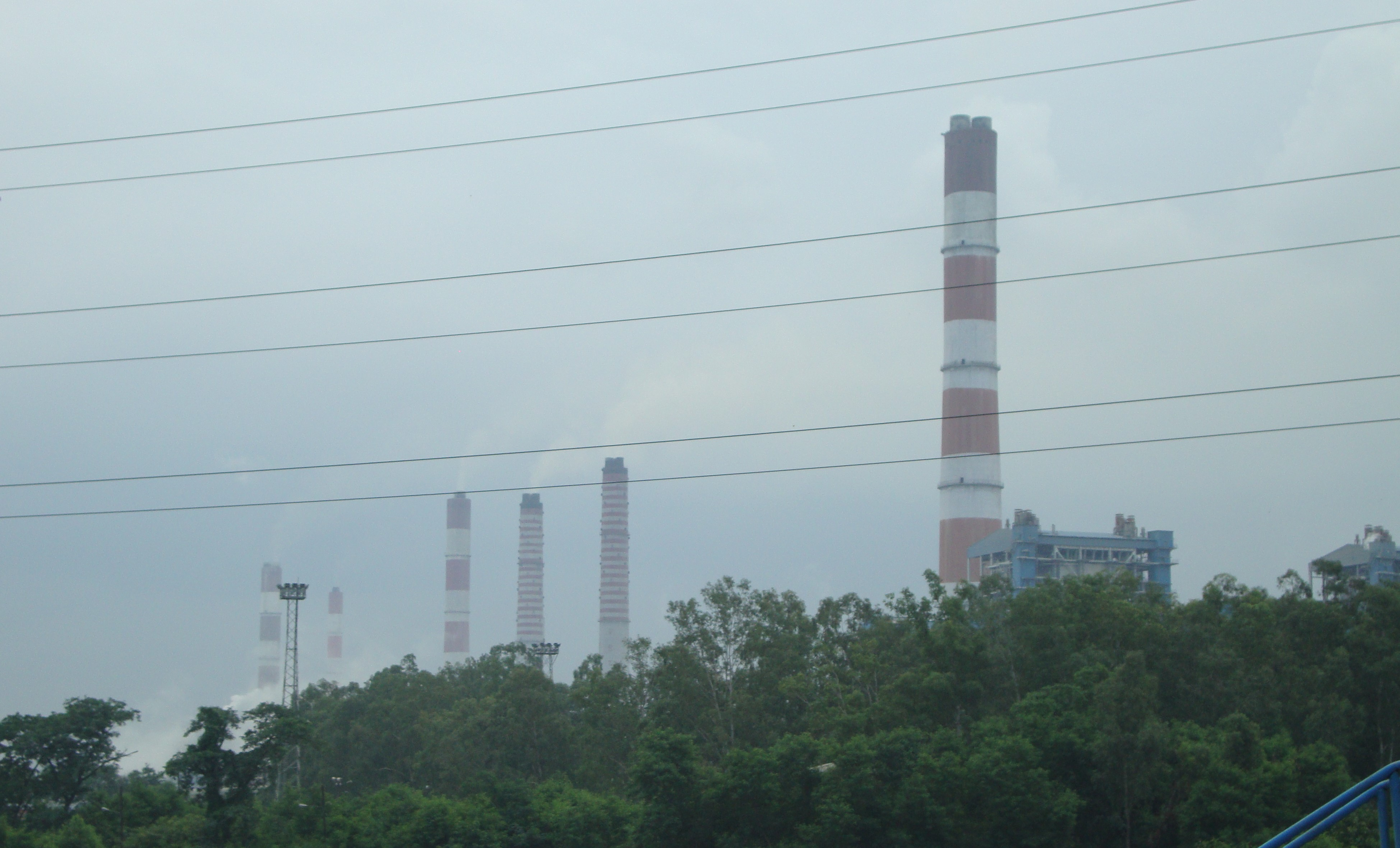
- Location of the Vindhyachal Super Thermal Power Station
- Official name: NTPC Vindhyachal
- Country: India
- Location: Waidhan, Singrauli District, Madhya Pradesh
- Coordinates: 24°5′50″N 82°40′25″E
- Status: Operational
- Construction began: 1982
- Commission date: 1987 (Stage I) to 2015 (Stage V)
- Owner: NTPC
- Operator: NTPC Limited

Thermal power station
- Primary fuel: Coal

Power generation
- Units operational: 6 × 210 MW; 7 × 500 MW; 2 × 4 MW HYDRO; 15 MW SOLAR
- Make and model: LMZ; Electrosila; BHEL
- Nameplate capacity: 4,783 MW

External links
- Website: ntpc.co.in/vindhyachal

The Vindhyachal Thermal Power Station is located in Singrauli district in the Indian state of Madhya Pradesh. One of the coal-fired power stations of NTPC, it is the largest power station in India, and the 10th-largest coal-fired power station in the world, with an installed capacity of 4,760 MW. The coal for the power plant is sourced from the Nigahi mines, and the water is sourced from the discharge canal of the Singrauli Super Thermal Power Station. The power plant is estimated to have been the coal-fired power plant which emitted the second-most carbon dioxide in 2018, after Bełchatów Power Station, at 33.9 million tons, and relative emissions are estimated at 1.485 kg per kWh.

The electricity is consumed in the following states: Madhya Pradesh, Gujarat, Maharashtra, Goa, Chhattisgarh, Daman & Diu and Dadar Nagar Haveli.

== Capacity ==
NTPC Vindhyachal
Stage	Unit	Installed Capacity (MW)	Date of Commissioning
I	1	210	October 1987
I	2	210	July 1988
I	3	210	February 1989
I	4	210	December 1989
I	5	210	March 1990
I	6	210	February 1991
II	7	500	March 1999
II	8	500	February 2000
III	9	500	July 2006
III	10	500	March 2007
IV	11	500	June 2012
IV	12	500	March 2013
V	13	500	August 2015
	Solar	15	
	Hydro	2 × 4	
Total		4783 MW	
