= Waidhan =

Waidhan Baidhan
- Location in Madhya Pradesh, India
- Coordinates: 24.066052°N 82.625351°E
- Country: India
- State: Madhya Pradesh
- District: Singrauli district

Government
  - Collector & District Magistrate (DM): Rajeev Ranjan Meena (IAS)
  - Superintendent of Police (SP): Deepak Kumar Shukla
  - Rank: 1
- Elevation: 376 m (1,234 ft)

Population (2011)
  - Total: 296,940

Literacy Rate
  - in 2011: 62.36%

Languages
  - Official: Hindi, English
- Time zone: UTC+5:30 (IST)
- PIN: 486886
- Telephone code: +91 7805
- Vehicle registration: MP 66

Waidhan is a city and a municipal board in Singrauli district in the Indian state of Madhya Pradesh, located in the Northeastern corner of the state. Waidhan is the administrative headquarters of Singrauli District. The Singrauli District and Waidhan as its district headquarters was created by separating three tehsils of Sidhi district: Singrauli, Deosar and Chitrangi Tehsils on 24 May 2008.

Located at the bank of Govind Ballabh Pant Sagar. Waidhan is surrounded by Singrauli Tehsil to the north, Chitrangi Tehsil to the north, Babhani Tehsil to the east, and Deosar Tehsil to the west.

== History ==
It was conquered by the Venvanshi kings of Singrauli and was ruled by them till 1947.

== Demographics ==
According to the 2011 census Waidhan has a population of 296,940 in which 152,382 males and 114,558 are females. The district has a population density of 208 inhabitants per square kilometre (540/sq mi). Waidhan has a sex ratio of 916 females for every 1,000 males and a literacy rate of 62.36%.

== Transportation ==
The nearest railway station to is Shaktinagar which is located 10.1 kilometers away.

Other nearby stations are:

1. Bargawan railway station - 25 km
2. Saktinagar railway station - 15 km
3. Singrauli railway station - 25 km
4. Anpara railway station – 32 km
5. Renukoot railway station – 61 km

The nearest airport is Muirpur Airstrip, 57.1 km away. Several more airports around Waidhan are:

1. Waidhan Airstrip (under construction)
2. Lal Bahadur Shastri Airport, Varanasi - 155.8 km
3. Prayagraj Airport – 177.3 km
4. Sidhi Airstrip – 105 km
5. Rewa Airstrip – 189 km
6. Satna Airstrip – 250 km

== Sports ==
The Rajmata Chun Kumari Stadium is the largest stadium in Waidhan. The association football stadium has a capacity of 20,000.
