= Bagheli language =

Indo-Aryan language spoken in India

Bagheli
- बघेली
- The word "Bagheli" written in Devanagari script
- Native to: India
- Region: Bagelkhand
- Language family: Indo-European: Indo-Iranian; Indo-Aryan; Central; Eastern Hindi; Bagheli
- Writing system: Devanagari

Language codes
- ISO 639-3: Either: bfy – Bagheli pwr – Powari
- Glottolog: bagh1251 Bagheli powa1246 Powari
- Linguasphere: 59-AAF-rc
- Baghelkhand region where Bagheli is spoken

Bagheli (Devanagari: बघेली, IPA: [bəɡʱeːliː]) or Baghelkhandi is a Central Indo-Aryan language spoken in the Baghelkhand region of central India.

== Phonology ==
=== Consonants ===
		Labial	Dental/ Alveolar	Retroflex	Post-alv./ Palatal	Velar	Glottal
Nasal		m	n	ɳ	ɲ	ŋ	
Stop/ Affricate	voiceless	p	t	ʈ	tɕ	k	
Stop/ Affricate	aspirated	pʰ	tʰ	ʈʰ	tɕʰ	kʰ	
Stop/ Affricate	voiced	b	d	ɖ	dʑ	ɡ	
Stop/ Affricate	breathy	bʱ	dʱ	ɖʱ	dʑʱ	ɡʱ	
Fricative			s	ʂ	ɕ		h
Tap	voiced		ɾ	ɽ			
Tap	breathy		ɾʱ	ɽʱ			
Lateral	voiced		l				
Lateral	breathy		lʱ				
Approximant		ʋ			j		

=== Vowels ===
	Front	Central	Back
High	iː		uː
High	ɪ		ʊ
Mid	eː	ə	oː
Mid	ɛ	ə	ɔ
Low	aː		

== Classification ==
A language belonging to the Eastern Hindi subgroup, Bagheli is one of the languages designated as a dialect of Awadhi by the Indian Census Report of 2011. Bagheli is a regional language used for intra-group and inter-group communication.

George Abraham Grierson in his Linguistic Survey of India classified Bagheli under Eastern Hindi. The extensive research conducted by local specialist Dr.Bhagawati Prasad Shukla is commensurate with Grierson's classification. Ethnologue cites Godwani, Kumhari and Rewa as dialects of Bagheli. According to Shukla, the Bagheli language has three varieties:

1. Pure Bagheli
2. Western-Mixed Bagheli
3. Southern-Broken Bagheli

Like many other Indo-Aryan languages, it has often been subject to erroneous, arbitrary, or politically-motivated designation as a dialect, instead of a language. Furthermore, as is the case with other Hindi languages, Bagheli speakers have been conflated with those of Standard Hindi in censuses.

== Geographical distribution ==
Bagheli is primarily spoken in the Mauganj, Rewa, Satna, Sidhi, Singrauli, Shahdol, Umaria, Anuppur, Katni districts of Madhya Pradesh and in some parts Mirzapur, Sonbhadra, Prayagraj and Chitrakoot districts of Uttar Pradesh and also Baikunthpur of Madhya Pradesh.

== Popular culture ==
The Pao, a scheduled tribe also known as the Pabra, speak Bagheli as their first language. Their language was mistakenly reported to be Tibeto-Burman by Ethnologue, perhaps due to confusion with the Pao language of Burma.

There are several radio and TV programmes in Bagheli. All India Radio is broadcasting Bagheli songs and agricultural programmes from Shahdol, Rewa and Bhopal. Furthermore, courses about Bagheli literature are available to be studied at Awadhesh Pratap Singh University, Rewa.

Devi Bhajan in Bagheli language
