= Singrauli =

Singrauli Urjanchal Urjādhānī
- City
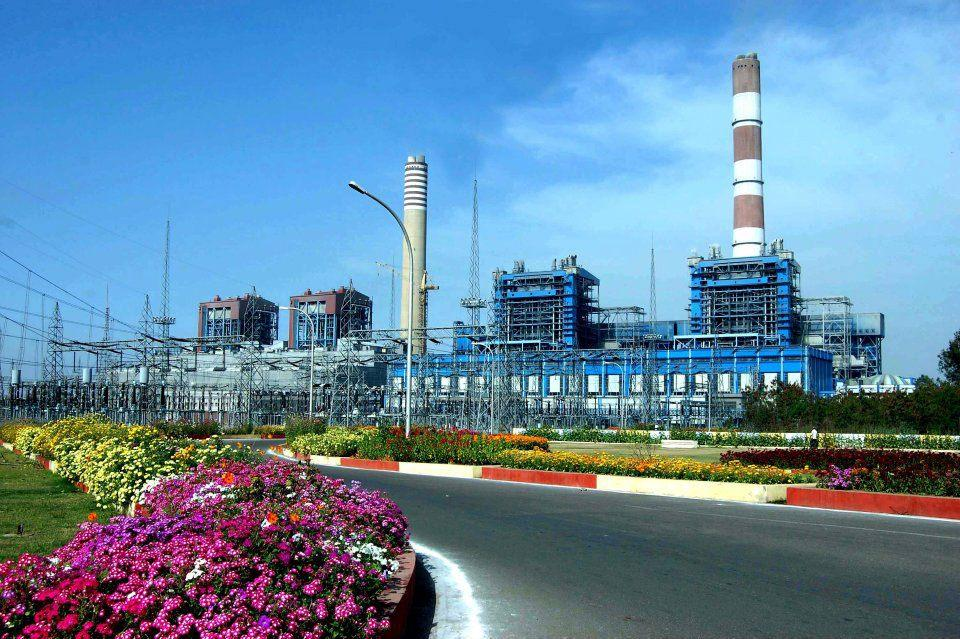
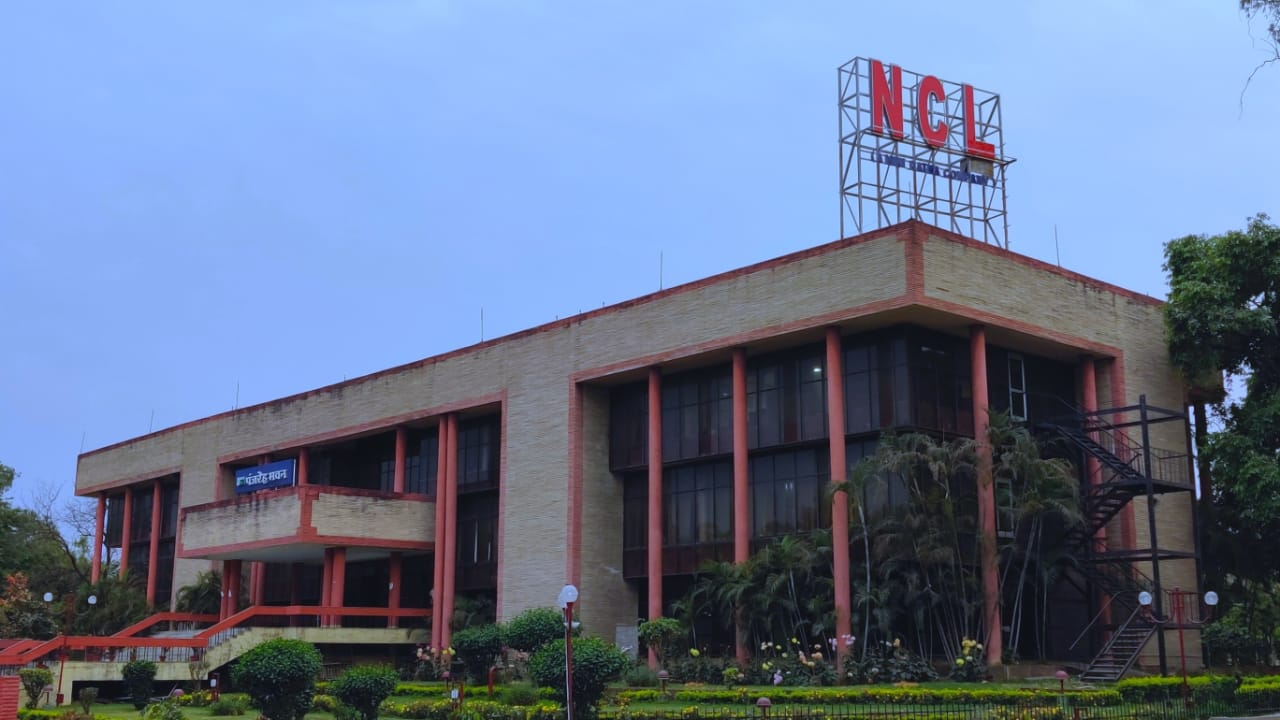
- Thermal Plant in Singrauli, Northern Coalfield Headquarter
- Nickname: Energy capital of India
- Location in Madhya Pradesh, India
- Coordinates: 24.202°N 82.666°E
- Country: India
- State: Madhya Pradesh
- District: Singrauli
- Division: Rewa

Government
  - Type: Municipal Corporation

Area
  - Total: 2,200 km^{2} (850 sq mi)
- Elevation: 463 m (1,519 ft)

Population (2011)
  - Total: 220,257
  - Density: 100/km^{2} (260/sq mi)

Languages
  - Official: Hindi, English
- Time zone: UTC+5:30
- PIN: 486889
- Telephone code: 07805
- Vehicle registration: MP-66
- Website: singrauli.nic.in

Singrauli is a city in Singrauli district in the Indian state of Madhya Pradesh and Commissionaire of Rewa. It lies about 26 kilometres (16 mi) from the district headquarters of Waidhan.

== History ==
Previously, it was a part of Singrauli State which was ruled by the Venvanshi Maharajas. Khairwar (tribe) are native of Singrauli (M.P.) who have been living here for many decades.

== Geography ==
Singrauli is located on 24.202°N 82.666°E. It is at an elevation of 394 m. 486889 is pin code of singrauli.

== Demographics ==
As of the 2011 Census of India, Singrauli had a population of 220,257, of which males were 53.1% and females were 46.9%. Child population (0–6) in urban region was 30,079. The average literacy rate in Singrauli was 75.51%.

== Administration ==
Singrauli Municipal Corporation is the local body governing the city, and is the second richest municipal corporation in Madhya Pradesh. Rani Agrawal is the mayor of the city. Singrauli is in Rewa Division.

== Politics ==
The city is part of the Singrauli Assembly constituency. Ramniwas Shah is MLA from here. It's part of Sidhi Lok Sabha constituency.

== Economy ==
The economy of Singrauli is mainly related to coal mining and related activities. Singrauli coal region is a big coal producing region. Many thermal plants are also operating here, which makes it the energy source of India. Along with this, an aluminium plant of Hindalco Industries is also located here. It is the 2nd largest district for per capita income in Madhya Pradesh.

Major Thermal Power Project and Plants of Singrauli -

- Singrauli Super Thermal Power Station
- Vindhyachal Thermal Power Station
- Essar Mahan Power Plant
- Mahan Hindalco Industries Ltd. a 900 MW captive power plant and alumina smelter located in Bargawa 20 km from Singrauli.

== Transport ==
Singrauli railway station - Here is a railway station located in Singrauli town. Its code is SGRL. The station consists of 3 platforms. Katni Singrauli railway line passing through here, which connects it from Delhi and Bhopal by train.
