= Benvanshi =

Indian caste

Benvanshi or Benbansi is a caste native to Central India.

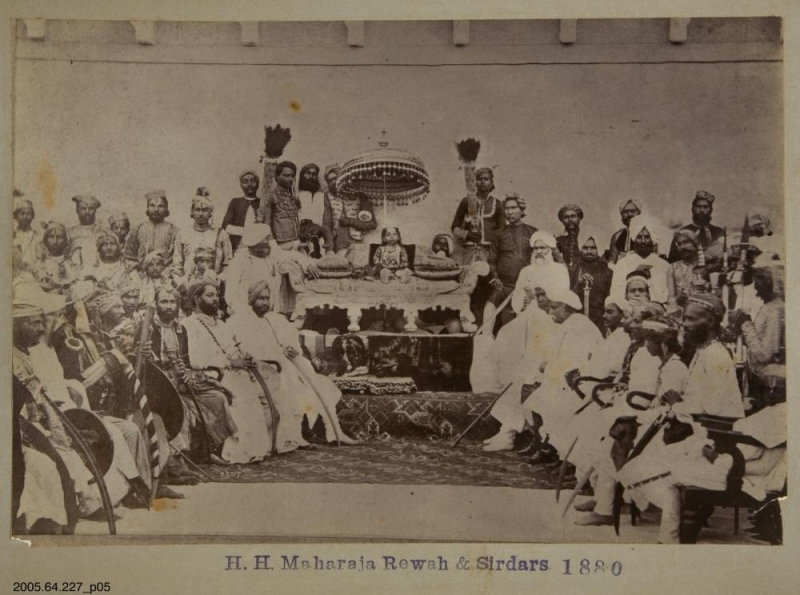
The Kharwar Maharaja of Singrauli with Sirdar

Benbansis originated as a Kharwar clan that elevated itself to the Rajput rank. Francis Buchanan-Hamilton, in his An Account Of The District Of Shahabad in 1812-13, mentions that the chief of Singrauli (in present-day Madhya Pradesh) and was not ashamed of calling himself a Kharwar. Later, he married his daughter to another Kharwar chief and who was offended at being called a Kharwar. After this event, the chief of Singrauli assumed the royal title of Raja. Buchanan wrote that chief's son would probably call himself a Rajput. This prediction was correct, as by 1896, the Raja of Singrauli claimed to be a "Benbansi Rajput", as recorded by William Crooke. Crooke wrote the name "Ben-bansi" ("of Ben family") is variously thought to be derived from the word ben meaning "bamboo" or from the name of the legendary king Vena. Crooke mentions that the Benbansis had "made rapid stride to acquire the rank of Rajputs".
