= Singrauli district =

City and district of Madhya Pradesh in India

Coordinates: 24°12′00″N 82°40′12″E

- District of Madhya Pradesh
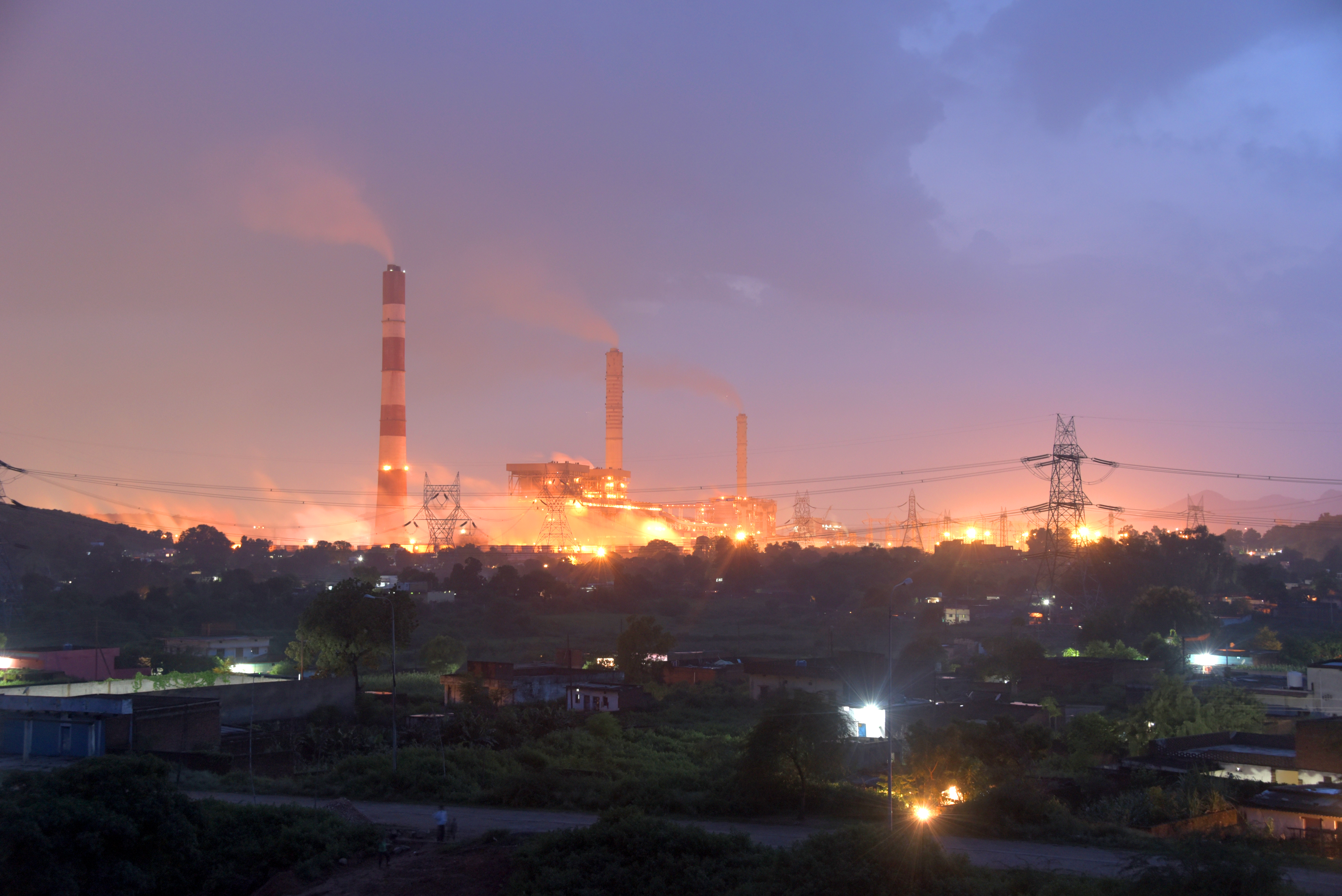
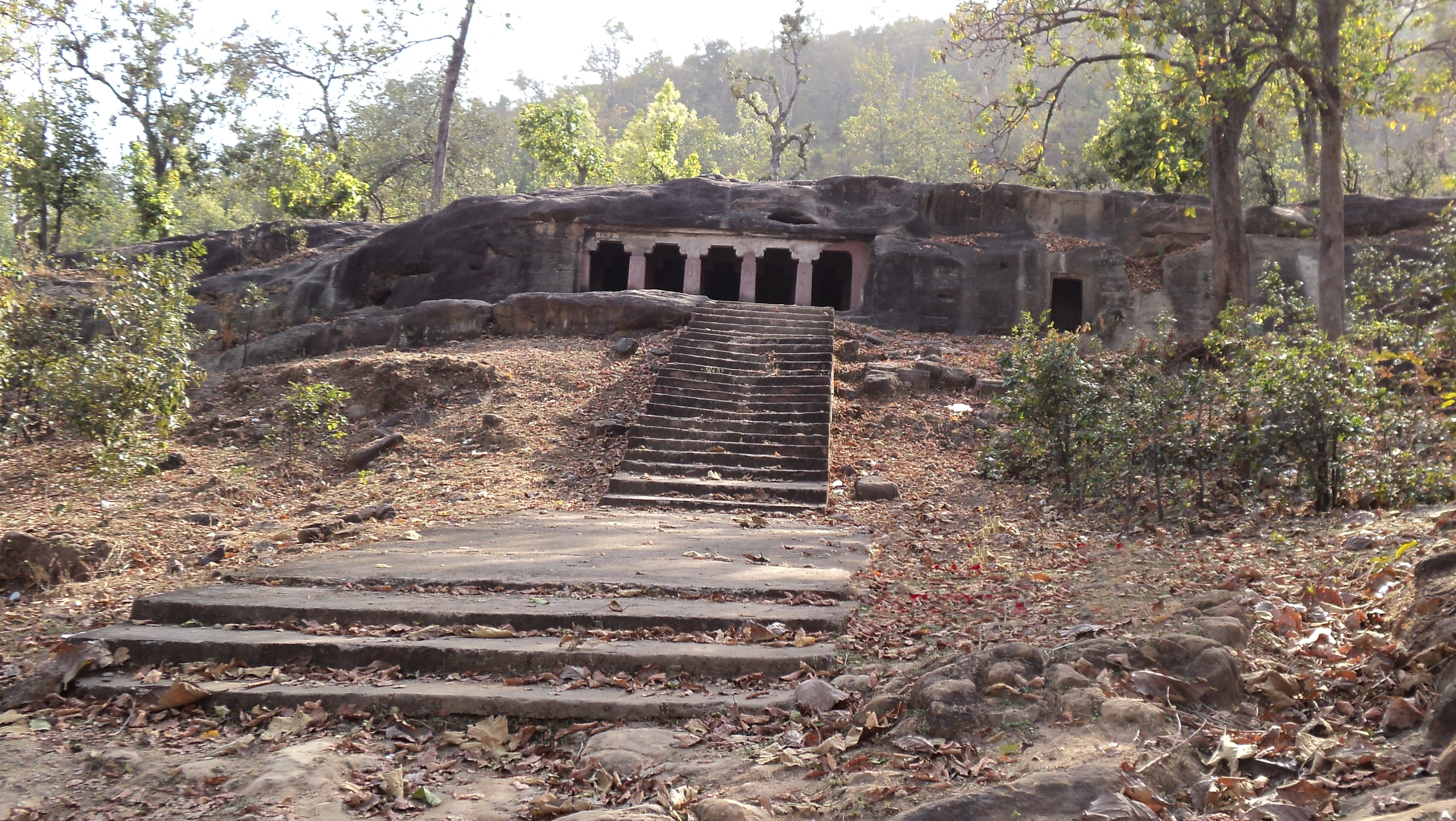
- Singrauli Power Project, Manda Caves

- Location of Singrauli district in Madhya Pradesh
- Country: India
- State: Madhya Pradesh
- Division: Rewa
- Headquarters: Waidhan
- Tehsils: Deosar; Chitrangi; Singrauli; Mada; Sarai

Government
  - Lok Sabha constituencies: Sidhi
  - Vidhan Sabha constituencies: 1. Chitrangi; 2. Singrauli Assembly constituency; 3. Deosar

Area
  - Total: 5,672 km^{2} (2,190 sq mi)

Population (2011)
  - Total: 1,178,273
  - Density: 207.7/km^{2} (538.0/sq mi)

Demographics
  - Literacy: 62.36 per cent
  - Sex ratio: 916
- Time zone: UTC+05:30 (IST)
- Major highways: NH 39
- Website: singrauli.nic.in

Singrauli district (Hindi pronunciation: [sɪŋg.ɾɔːliː]) is one of the districts in the Indian state of Madhya Pradesh.Singrauli district is located northeastern part of Madhya Pradesh.It is a significant hub for energy production due to its vast coal reserves and power plants, earning it the title "Energy Capital of India".

Historically ruled by local Maharajas until 1947, the district underwent major transformation in the mid-20th century with the construction of the Govind Vallabh Pant Sagar dam and the discovery of rich coal deposits. The district has a diverse population, predominantly Hindu, with significant Scheduled Castes and Tribes.

== History ==
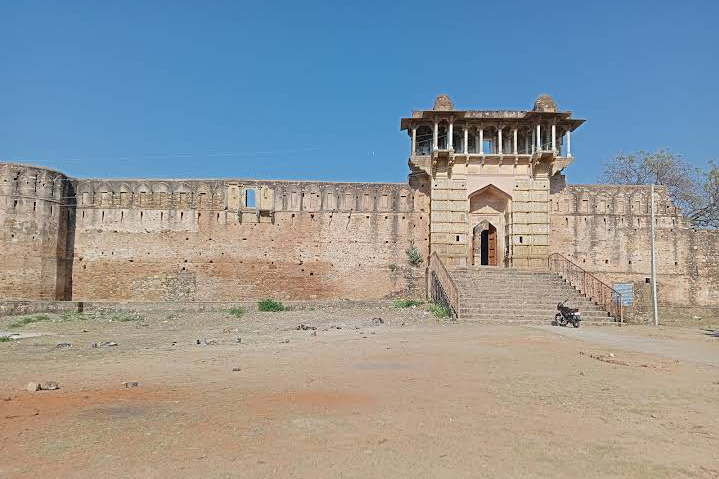
Vardi's Fort

Previously, Singrauli was ruled by the Maharajas of the Singrauli State until the monarchy was abolished in 1947. The district's headquarters is located at Waidhan, and it was once the largest district in the Bagelkhand Division of Vindhya Pradesh.

In the mid-20th century, significant changes occurred as a large dam was constructed on the River Rihand. This dam, known as Govind Vallabh Pant Sagar, was inaugurated by Prime Minister Jawaharlal Nehru in 1962. The discovery of rich coal deposits spanning 2,200 km^{2} in Madhya Pradesh (eastern Sidhi district) and Uttar Pradesh (southern Sonebhadra district) near this artificial lake positioned Singrauli as a major electricity-generating region.

Singrauli is also home to ancient rock-cut caves, created between the 7th and 8th centuries AD. Located 32 km from Waidhan in Mada tehsil, these caves include notable sites such as Vivah Mada, Ganesh Mada, Shankar Mada, Jaljalia, and Ravan Mada.

In addition to these caves, Singrauli features painted rock shelters, such as those at Ranimachi, Dholagiri, and Goura Pahad, situated in Chitrangi tehsil. These shelters date back to the Mesolithic age, characterized by microlithic tool cultures, and showcase early examples of Indian art made with red ochre.

Despite its cultural and economic significance, Singrauli faces challenges such as pollution threatening its historical sites. Additionally, the district struggles with poor road connectivity and inadequate transportation services, issues that have persisted for years without resolution.

== Geography ==
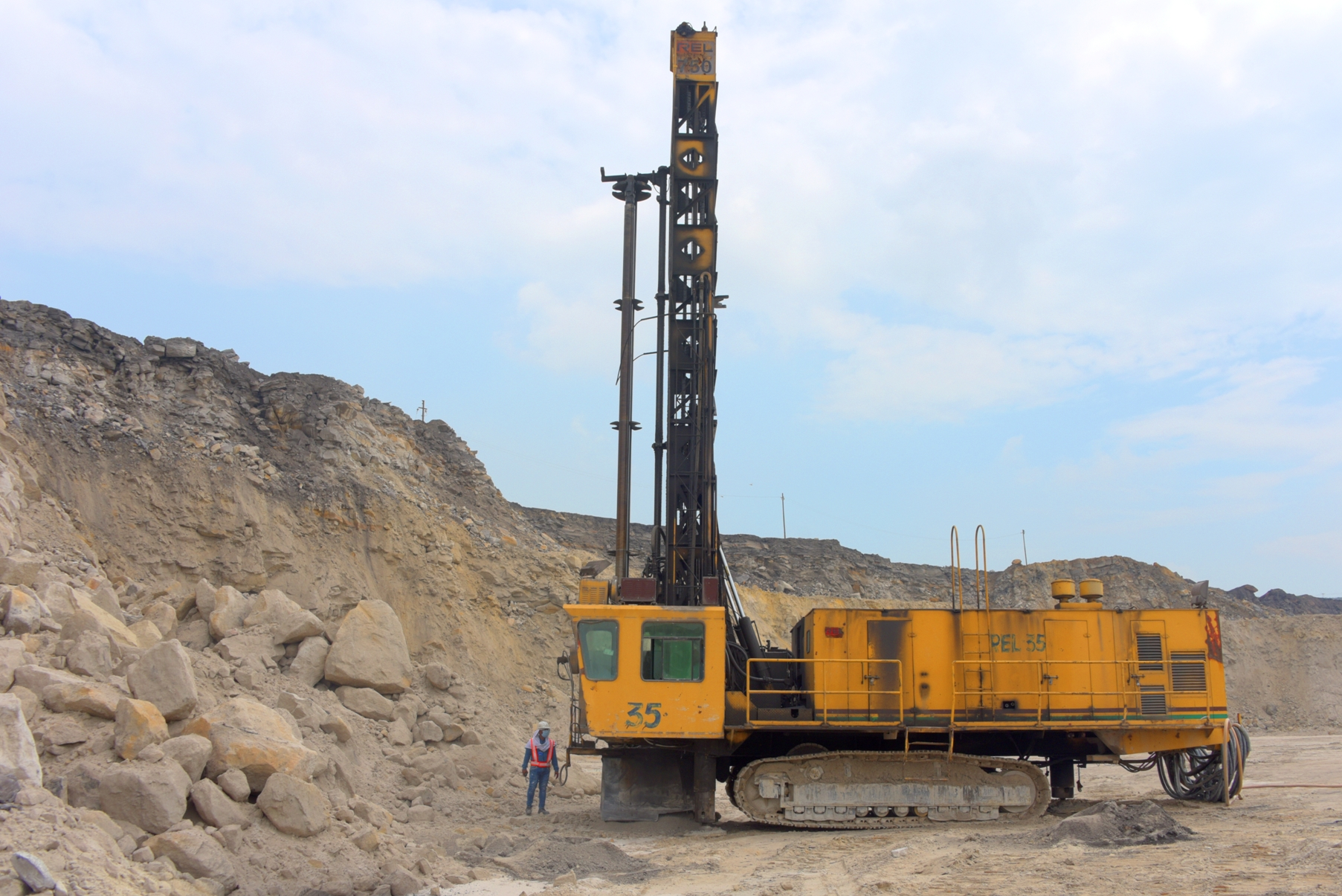
Mining drill at Dudhichua coal mine

The Singrauli district covers an area of 5,672 square kilometres (2,190 sq mi). it shared its boundary with Sidhi District of Madhya Pradesh. Sone River and Gopad River are the major rivers of the district, and the district is surrounded by the Vindhya and Kaimur Ranges. Coal is found in abundant quantity in the district.

Waidhan, Singrauli, Bargawan, Deosar, Chitrangi, Sarai are the major towns of the District.

== Divisions ==
The Singrauli district comprises three tehsils, namely, Singrauli, Deosar and Chitrangi. Since then, two more tehsils have been added to this district: Mada and Sarai. Later, Waidhan, Bargawan and Dudhmaniya Tehsil was also formed.

== Politics ==
There are three Madhya Pradesh Vidhan Sabha constituencies in the Singrauli district, namely, Chitrangi, Singrauli and Deosar. All of these are part of Sidhi Lok Sabha constituency.

== Demographics ==
Historical population
Year	Pop.	±% p.a.
1901	134,232	—
1911	156,377	+1.54%
1921	134,657	−1.48%
1931	154,465	+1.38%
1941	181,056	+1.60%
1951	198,191	+0.91%
1961	247,355	+2.24%
1971	336,117	+3.11%
1981	458,369	+3.15%
1991	663,998	+3.78%
2001	920,169	+3.32%
2011	1,178,273	+2.50%
Source: Census of India

Religions in Singrauli district (2011)
Religion	Percent
Hinduism	94.97%
Islam	3.95%
Other (tribal religion)	0.52%
Other or not stated	0.56%

According to the 2011 census of India, Singrauli district has a population of 1,178,273, roughly equal to the nation of Timor-Leste or the US state of Rhode Island. This gives it a ranking of 402nd in India (out of a total of 640). The district has a population density of 208 inhabitants per square kilometre (540/sq mi). Its population growth rate over the decade 2001-2011 was 28.03%. Singrauli has a sex ratio of 916 females for every 1000 males, and a literacy rate of 62.36%. 19.25% of the population lives in urban areas. Scheduled Castes and Tribes made up 12.79% and 32.59% of the population respectively. The largest tribes are the Gonds, who are 50% of the tribal population, and Kols, 16% of the tribal population.

Languages of Sidhi district (2011)
1. Hindi (89.6%)
2. Bagheli (4.49%)
3. Gondi (1.64%)
4. Others (4.28%)

At the time of the 2011 Census of India, 89.59% of the population in the district spoke Hindi, 4.49% Bagheli, and 1.64% Gondi as their first language.

== Places of interest ==
District has many tourist places and Attractive Sites to visit -

- Vardi Fort
- Manda Caves
- Bagdara Wildlife Sanctuary
- Vindhyanagar Lake
- Jayant Rose Garden and eco park

== Education ==
Singrauli district is home Veena Vadini School, a unique ambidextrous school in Budhela where students are taught to write simultaneously with both hands. The school was created by a former Army soldier Shri V.P. Sharma in July 1999.

== Economy ==
Singrauli is also known as Energy Capital of India. The Rihand Dam was built in 1961 across the Rihand River at Pipri in the neighbouring district of Sonbhadra, in Uttar Pradesh. Later, rich coal deposits spread over an area of 2,200 square kilometres (850 sq mi) across the states of Uttar Pradesh and Madhya Pradesh were discovered close to the artificial lake, Govind Ballabh Pant Sagar formed by the Rihand Dam. That led to the transformation and development of the area.

=== Coal mining and power ===
Northern Coalfields is the major business of the district. The headquarters of the company are at Singrauli. The company is a subsidiary of Coal India, which is the largest coal producing company in world.

Power plant in Singrauli District
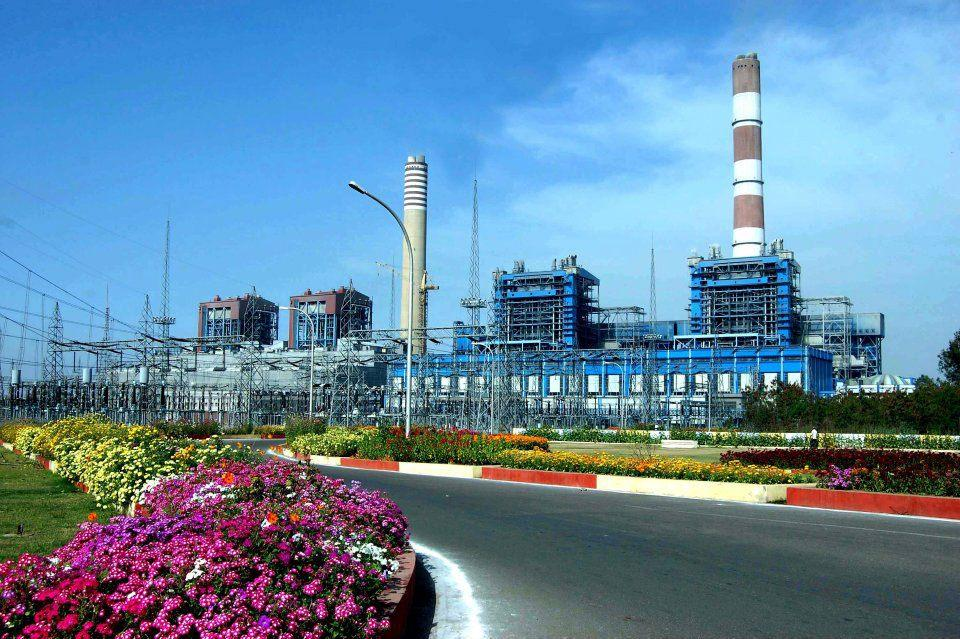

The Singrauli Coalfield can be divided into two basins, viz. Moher sub-basin (312 km^{2}.) and Singrauli Main basin (1890 km^{2}.). The major part of the Moher sub-basin lies in the Sidhi district of Madhya Pradesh and a small part lies in the Sonebhadra district of Uttar Pradesh. Singrauli main basin lies in the western part of the coalfield and is largely unexplored. The present coal mining activities and future blocks are concentrated in Moher sub-basin. Lignite is the form of coal excavated from these coal mines. These coal mines are a hub for the Heavy Earth Moving Machines (HEMM).

The exploration carried out by GSI/NCDC/CMPDI has proved abundant resource of power grade coal in the area. This in conjunction with easy water resource from Govind Ballabh Pant Sagar makes this region an ideal location for high capacity pithead power plants. The coal supplies from NCL has made it possible to produce more than 11000 MW of electricity from pithead power plants of National Thermal Power Corporation (NTPC), The region is now called the Energy Capital of India. The ultimate capacity of power generation of these power plants is 13295 MW and NCL is fully prepared to meet the increased demand of coal for the purpose. In addition, NCL supplies coal to power plants of Rajasthan Rajya Vidyut Utpadan Nigam, Delhi Vidyut Board (DVB) and Haryana Power Generation Corporation Limited.

== Industries ==
All major companies operating in Singrauli are giants of Indian energy industry. The operations of companies include mining of coal to power generation. In recent past, several private companies have also joined the league of companies operating in Singrauli. It is expected by 2017, that Singrauli would feed around 35,000 MW of electrical power to the grid alone.

Major companies operating or coming up at Singrauli are:

Name of Industry	Industry Type	Operator	Date of Establishment	District	State	Capacity	Notes
Singrauli Super Thermal Power Station (SSTPS)	Thermal Power (electricity)	NTPC	1977	P.O. : Shaktinagr, Sonebhadra district	Uttar Pradesh	5 x 200 MW + 2 x 500 MW=2000 MW	With international assistance of IDA & KFW
Vindhyachal Thermal Power Station (VTPS)	Thermal Power (electricity)	NTPC	1982	P.O. : Vingdhyanagar, Singrauli District	Madhya Pradesh	1260 MW (6X210 MW) under Stage-I, 1000 MW (2X500 MW) of Stage-II and 1000 MW (2X500 MW) under Stage-III. Total=3260 and 1000MW of Stage-IV is under construction.	With international assistance of USSR-stage I, World bank under time slice loan stage II
Rihand Thermal Power Station (RTPS)	Thermal Power (electricity)	NTPC	1977	P.O. : Rihandnagar, Sonebhadra district	Uttar Pradesh	1000 MW (2x500 MW each) in Stage-I and 1000 MW (2x500 MW each) in Stage-II Total= 2000MW and 1000MW of stage-III has been commissioned recently.	With international assistance of United Kingdom
Northern Coalfields Limited	Coal mining	Coal India Limited	1984	P.O. : Singrauli Colliery, Singrauli District	Madhya Pradesh	coal supplies made it possible to produce about 13295 MW of electricity from pithead power plants of NTPC, UPRVUNL and Renupower division of M/s. Hindalco Industries	Thickest coal seam of India-131 metres (Jhingurda seam)
Sasan Ultra Mega Power Project	Thermal Power Plant (electricity)	Reliance Power	2013	Vill. : Sasan, Singrauli District	Madhya Pradesh	3,960 MW	Generated Highest PLF in India
Chitrangi Power Project	Thermal Power Plant (electricity)	Reliance Power	2007 (bidding)	Chitrangi, Singrauli District	Madhya Pradesh	3,960 MW	under construction(Put on hold due to CAG Report)
Muher and Muher Amlori extension	Coal mining	Reliance Power	2007(bidding)	Muher - Amlohri, Singrauli District	Madhya Pradesh	coal reserves of these mines are around 720 MT with a production level of 25 mtpa	---
Mahan Super Thermal Power Project	Thermal Power plant (electricity)	Essar Group	2007(bidding)	Vill. : Bandhaura, Singrauli District	Madhya Pradesh	2x 600 MW = 1200MW	unit I commissioned, unit II in under construction
Mahan Captive Thermal Power Plant	Thermal Power plant(electricity)	Hindalco Industries	2007(bidding)	Rewa-Ranchi; NH-75(E), Bargawan, Singrauli District	Madhya Pradesh	900-MW 150x6	Out of 6 Units, I, II & III Commissioned by BHEL
Mahan coal Limited	Coal mining	joint venture of Essar and Hindalco	2007(bidding)	Vill. : Ameliya, Singrauli District	Madhya Pradesh	-	Essar will take 60% of the coal output and Hindalco will take the remaining 40%
Mahan Aluminium Limited	Aluminium smelter plant	Hindalco Industries	2007(bidding)	Rewa-Ranchi; NH-75(E) Bargawan, Singrauli District	Madhya Pradesh	359-ktpa aluminum smelter	Production started
Jaypee Nigrie Super Thermal Power Project	Thermal Power plant (electricity)	Jaypee Group	2007(bidding)	Singrauli District	Madhya Pradesh	2 x 660 MW= 1320 MW	Under Erection
M.P. Jaypee Minerals	Coal mining	joint venture of M.P. government and Jaypee Group	2007(bidding)	Vill. : Nigaree, Singrauli District	Madhya Pradesh	2 million tonnes	---
DB Power M.P.Limited	Thermal Power plant (electricity)	Dainik Bhaskar	---	Near Nigaree, Singrauli District	Madhya Pradesh	1320 MW	underconstruction
VindhyaChal Pooling sub-station	Power transmission	Powergrid	---	Singrauli District	Madhya Pradesh	from SasanUMPP (2 No 765 kV S/C Sasan - Satna Transmission lines) and Vindhyachal Stage-IV (400 kV DC (Quad)Vindhyachal - Vindhyachal Pooling line), 2 No 765 kV S/C from Vindhyachal Pooling to Satna Sub-Station, a 765/400 kV Pooling substation near Vindhyachal Stage-IV (1000 MW), Rihand Stage-III (1000 MW) as well as Aryan Coal Benefication Pvt Ltd. (1200 MW) Generation Projects	---
Amelia coal block	Coal mining	Joint Venture Company of Sainik mines and M.P. State Mining Corporation Ltd.	---	Singrauli District	Madhya Pradesh	-----	---

== See also ==
- Singrauli railway station
