= Barokhar =

- Location within India
- Coordinates: 24°55′N 81°58′E
- Country: India
- State: Uttar Pradesh
- District: Prayagraj
- Tehsil: Koraon

Population (2011)
  - Total: 11,815

Languages
- Time zone: UTC+5:30 (IST)

Barokhar is a village in Uttar Pradesh, India. It is close to the Madhya Pradesh State border in Koraon Tehsil of the Prayagraj district. The village is 22 km from Koraon and 75 km from the city of Prayagraj. According to the 2011 census, the location/village code is 163702.

The area of the village is 2,999.44 hectares (7,411.8 acres). Barokhar has a population of 11,815. There are about 2,000 houses in the village. Prayagraj is the nearest city to Barokhar, and the nearest town is Koraon. Sights include ponds and ancient Hindu temples. Belaon and Turiyari are rivers that flow through the village. Barokhar is home to a private school, Krishak Shanti Niketan, and a college. Surrounding the town are mountains and various waterfalls.
