= Meja Thermal Power Station =

Planned thermal power plant in Uttar Pradesh, India

Coordinates: 25.1456°N 81.9407°E

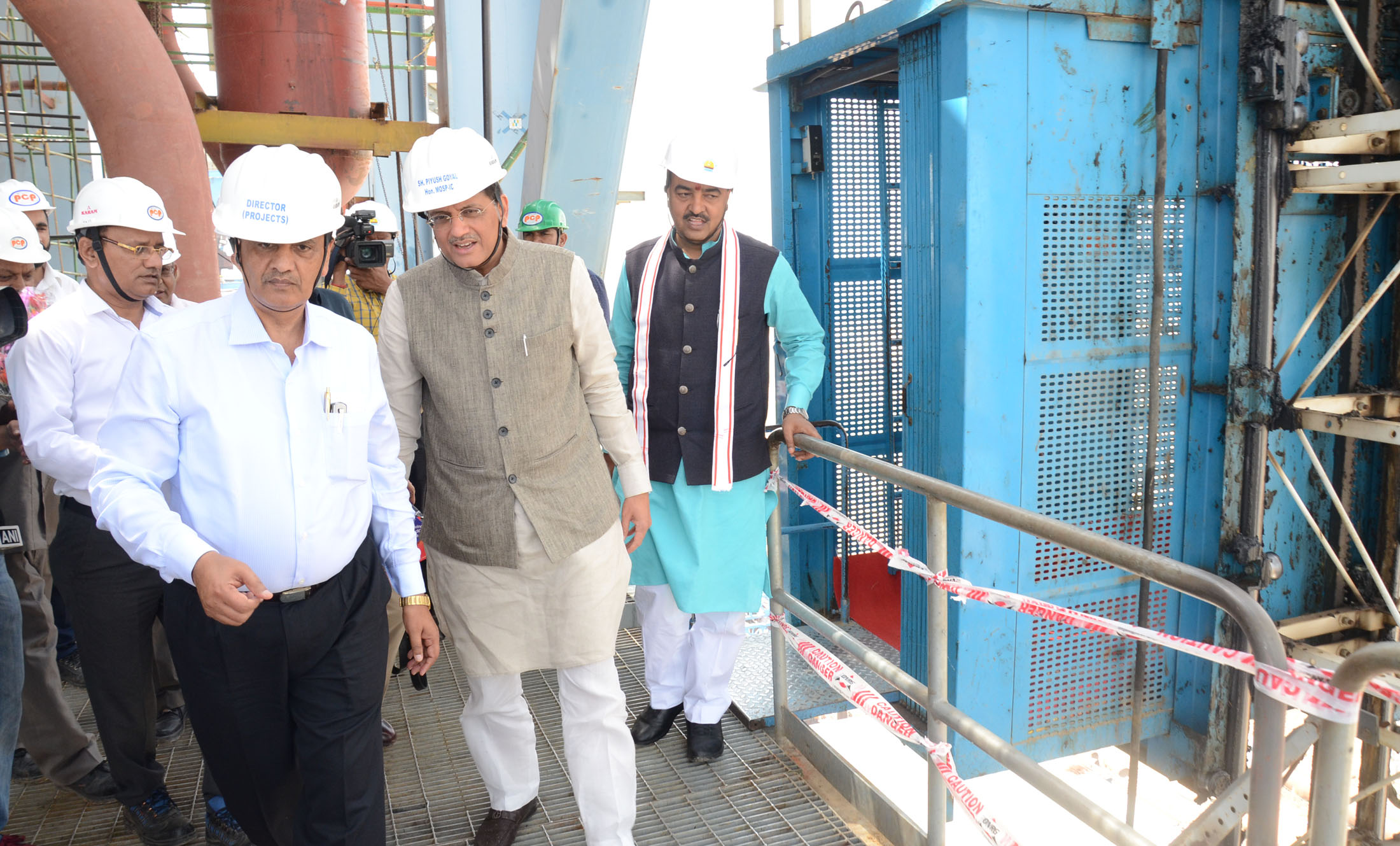
The Minister of State (Independent Charge) for Power, Coal and New and Renewable Energy, Shri Piyush Goyal visiting the Meja Thermal Power Project, 2016

Meja Thermal Power Station is an upcoming coal-based thermal power plant located in Meja Tehsil in Prayagraj district, Uttar Pradesh. The power plant is owned by the Meja Urja Nigam Private Limited (MUNPL), a joint venture between NTPC Limited and Uttar Pradesh Rajya Vidyut Utpadan Nigam. The planned capacity of the power plant is 1320 MW (2×660 MW).

== Capacity ==
The planned capacity of the power plant is 1320 MW (2×660 MW).

Stage	Unit number	power (MW)	Date of commissioning	Status
1st	1	660	April 2018	Commissioned
1st	2	660	January 2021	Unit commissioned and in service wef 31.01.2022.

== Future expansion ==
The state government decided in July 2014 to add two more units of 660 MW to the power plant as part of the second stage of the project. Work is yet to start.
