= Majhila =

- Village
- Interactive map of Majhila
- Country: India
- State: Uttar Pradesh

Government
  - Body: Gram panchayat

Population
  - Total: 300

Languages
  - Official: Hindi
- Time zone: UTC+5:30 (IST)
- Vehicle registration: UP
- Website: up.gov.in

Majhila is a small village between the towns of Koraon and Kohnar in Meja Tehsil, Prayagraj district, Uttar Pradesh, India. It has a population of approximately 300 people.
