= Uttar Pradesh Power Corporation Limited =

Electricity transmission and distribution company in Uttar Pradesh

Uttar Pradesh Power Corporation Limited (UPPCL)
- LOGO Used on the official website
- Native name: उत्तर प्रदेश पावर कारपोरेशन लिमिटेड
- Type: Uttar Pradesh State Government Undertaking
- Industry: Electric Power
- Predecessor: UPSEB
- Founded: 30 November 1999; 26 years ago
- Headquarters: Lucknow, India
- Area served: Uttar Pradesh
- Key people: Shri A. K. Sharma, Ashish Kumar Goel (Chairman), Mayur Maheshwari (IAS) (Managing Director)
- Services: Electricity Transmission & Distribution
- Owner: Government of Uttar Pradesh
- Subsidiaries: DVVNL; MVVNL; PVVNL; PuVVNL; KESCO
- Website: uppcl.org

Uttar Pradesh Power Corporation Limited (UPPCL) is a state government company, responsible for electricity transmission and distribution within the Indian state of Uttar Pradesh. The incumbent chairman is Dr. Ashish Kumar Goel.

== History ==
U.P. Power Corporation Limited was incorporated on 30 November 1999 and commenced its business w.e.f. 15 January 2000. It was formed as part of restructuring of then Uttar Pradesh State Electricity Board (UPSEB).

== Organization ==
For efficient operation & management, UPPCL is divided six divisions:

- Dakshinanchal Vidyut Vitaran Nigam Limited (DVVNL) - Agra Zone Discom
- Madhyanchal Vidyut Vitaran Nigam Limited (MVVNL) - Lucknow, Ayodhya Zone Discom
- Pashchimanchal Vidyut Vitaran Nigam Limited (PVVNL) - Meerut Zone Discom
- Purvanchal Vidyut Vitaran Nigam Limited (PUVVNL) - Prayagraj, Varanasi Zone Discom
- Kanpur Electricity Supply Company (KESCO) - Kanpur City Discom

== Power procurement ==
UPPCL procures power from state government-owned power generators (Uttar Pradesh Rajya Vidyut Utpadan Nigam & Uttar Pradesh Jal Vidyut Nigam Limited), central government-owned power generators (NTPC Limited & THDC Ltd) and independent power producers - IPP (mostly private power companies) through power purchase agreement for lowest per unit cost of electricity.

== Financial condition and line losses ==
The total loss of the UPPCL for the year ended on 31 March 2017 is estimated to be ₹ 8,825 crores.

The causes of such poor financial conditions include:

- Higher line losses due to ageing over-stressed infrastructure
- Pilferage of power at large scale
- Inferior quality of transformers and other equipment
- Widespread corruption
- Inefficient use of IT-enabled infrastructure for administrative as well as technical purposes

Discom-wise Aggregate Technical & Commercial (AT&C) Loss / Total line losses (in %) for the period 2010-11:

- Dakshinanchal Vidyut Vitaran Nigam Limited (DVVNL) - 46.80%
- Madhyanchal Vidyut Vitaran Nigam Limited (MVVNL) - 39.10%
- Pashchimanchal Vidyut Vitaran Nigam Limited (PVVNL) - 31.60%
- Purvanchal Vidyut Vitaran Nigam Limited (PUVVNL) - 29.72%

== Power plants ==
In line of Power Finance Corporation, UPPCL created Special Purpose Vehicles (SPVs):

- To attract private investment in the implementation of New Power Plant Projects in the state of Uttar Pradesh
- To meet the growing power demand of Uttar Pradesh state
- To procure power at the lowest possible feasible rates

The role of SPVs are -

- Preparing feasibility report (including Technology, Size, Coal linkages, Land & Water issues),
- Clearances (including environment clearances) & land acquisition, etc.

These SPVs are transferred to a developer private company through bidding for the lowest per unit cast of selling electricity to UPPCL.

UPPCL SPVs:

- Bara Thermal Power Project, Prayagraj Power Generation Company Limited (Tehsil - Bara, Distt. Allahabad) - 3 x 660 MW
- Tanda thermal power plant (Ambedkar Nagar district) 4× 1680 MW, 4× 660 MW
- Karchana Thermal Power Station, Sangam Power Generation Company Limited (Tehsil - Karchana, Distt. Allahabad) - 2 x 660 MW (Under Construction)
