= Cheonki, Prayagraj =

Cheonki
- Locality and Village
- Chheoki
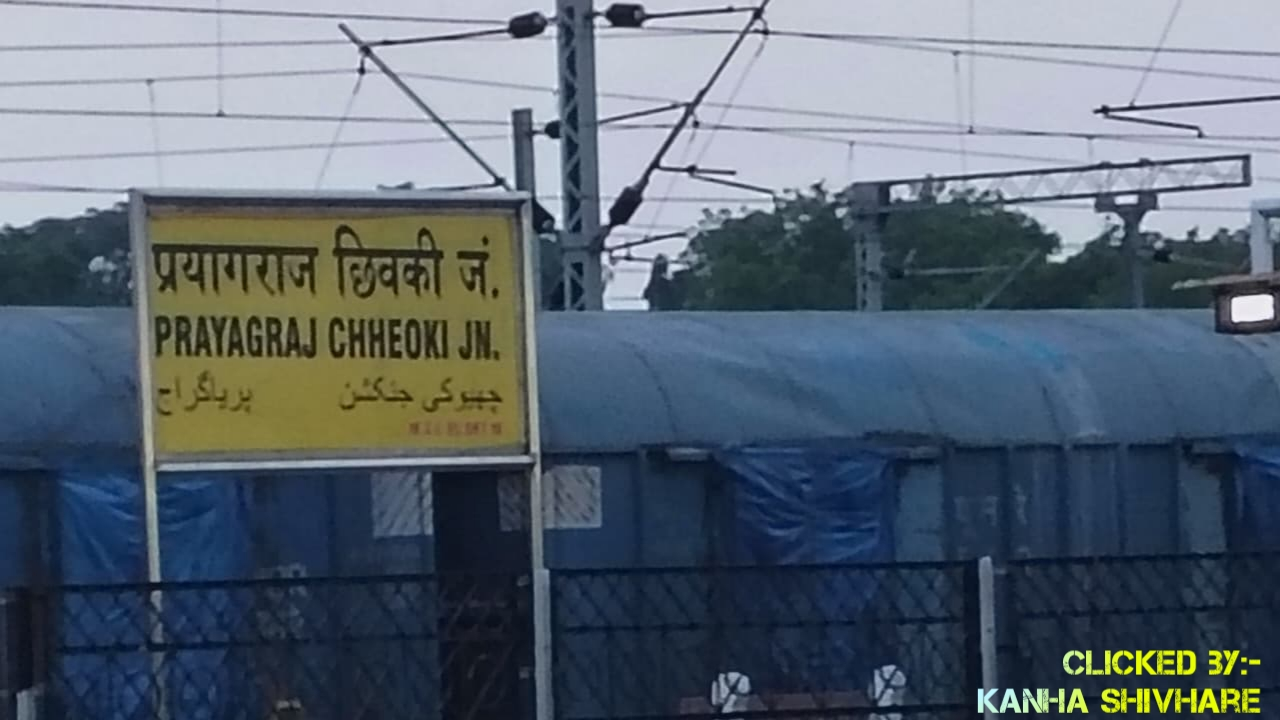
- Interactive map of Cheonki
- Location within Uttar Pradesh Location within India
- Coordinates: 25°23′02″N 81°52′26″E
- Country: India
- State: Uttar Pradesh
- Division: Allahabad Division
- District: Prayagraj district
- Tehsil: Karchhana Tehsil
- City: Prayagraj
- Part of: Naini

Area
  - Total: 0.35 km^{2} (0.14 sq mi)
- Elevation: 95 m (312 ft)

Population (2011)
  - Total: 1,600
  - Density: 4,571.43/km^{2} (11,839.9/sq mi)

Languages
  - Official: Hindi • Urdu • English
- Time zone: UTC+5:30 (IST)
- PIN: 211008
- Gender Population distribution: Source: Census of India: 1. Males 829 (51.8%); 2. Females 771 (48.2%); Sex ratio: 931 females per 1000 males
- Website: prayagraj.nic.in

Cheonki (pronounced as Chheoki/Chipki) is a village and locality in Naini, Karchhana Tehsil, in Prayagraj City, Prayagraj District, Allahabad Division of Uttar Pradesh, India.

== Transport ==
PRAYAGRAJ CHHEOKI JUNCTION Railway station is nearby, which is named after the village. It is 9.3 kilometres (5.8 mi) away from Prayagraj Junction and 2 kilometres (1.2 mi) from Naini railway station. It was built to reduce congestion on Main station and used for bypass by some trains.

== Demographics ==
As per 2011 census, Cheonki has a population of 1.6k in 274 households with male population of 829 and female population of 771. Children population is 193, making up 12.06% of the population. Literacy rate is 77.54%, above than State average of 67.68% and National average of 72.98%, with male literacy being 85.28% and female literacy being 69.26%. Cheonki has a scheduled caste population of 570 with 283 being males and 287 being females.

Castes in Cheonki:
1. Schedule Castes 570 (35.6%)
2. Non Indigenous 1,030 (64.4%)

== Employment ==
Cheonki Unemployment is 78.06%.

Number of Workers is 351.
