= Meja (disambiguation) =

Meja is a Swedish composer, artist and singer born in 1969.

Meja may also refer to:

- Meja (album), a 1996 album by Meja

== Geography ==
- Meja, Allahabad district Meja Tehsil, a tehsil of Allahabad, India
- Meja Road, a district of an eastern Allahabad, and a railway station in India
- Meja Dam, on Kothari River Rajasthan
- Meja, Kranj, a settlement in the Upper Carniola region of Slovenia
- Meja, Kosovo, site of Meja massacre
- Rocca la Meja mountain in the Province of Cuneo, Piedmont, Italy

== People ==
- Meja Mwangi (1948–2025), Kenyan writer
- Daniel Meja, French ballet dancer

== Acronyms ==
- Methyl jasmonate or MeJA, volatile organic compound used in plant defense and many diverse developmental pathways such as seed germination
- Military Extraterritorial Jurisdiction Act
