= Panki Thermal Power Station =

Thermal power station in Panki, Uttar Pradesh, India

Coordinates: 26.477046°N 80.24104°E

Panki Thermal Power Station is located at Panki in Kanpur, Uttar Pradesh. Its first stage was commissioned in 1967 by the then Prime Minister, Indira Gandhi. It has an installed capacity of 660 Mega Watts. The power plant is owned and operated by Uttar Pradesh Rajya Vidyut Utpadan Nigam. It has a 275 Metres high chimney which is one of the tallest structures in India

== Operations ==
The plant has been set up in three stages. The stage had two units of 32 megawatts each and it began operation in 1967 both the units ceased operations in 1998. The second stage had two units of 110 megawatts each and began operation in 1977. The machinery for the second stage was from Bharat Heavy Electricals Limited. The second stage ceased operations in 2018 and a third stage was planned. The Third Stage is under construction, it will have 1 unit of 660 Mega Watts, its foundation stone was laid by Prime Minister Narendra Modi in 2019, and it will begin operation by December 2022. The coal to all these units is fed from coal mines of Bharat Coking Coal Limited, Eastern Coalfields Limited by means of Railways.

Installed Capacity (MW)	Date of Commissioning	Status
32	1967	Ceased Operation in 1998
32	1968	Ceased Operation in 1998
110	1977 January	Ceased Operation in 2018
110	1977 May	Ceased Operation in 2018
660	2022 Dec	Under Construction

== Future expansion ==
The state government decided in July 2014 to build a unit of 660 Mega Watts to the power plant. A contract was issued by UPRVUNL to BHEL on EPC basis for construction of 1x660 MW units at Panki on 31 March 2018, with scheduled project completion in December 2022.

== See also ==
- Anpara Thermal Power Station
- Obra Thermal Power Station
- Parichha Thermal Power Station
- Harduaganj Thermal Power Station
