= Karchana Thermal Power Station =

Karchana Thermal Power Station is a proposed coal-based thermal power plant located in Bara Tehsil in Prayagraj district, Uttar Pradesh. The power plant will be owned and operated by Uttar Pradesh Rajya Vidyut Utpadan Nigam. Earlier the plant was supposed to be owned and operated by Sangam Power Generation Company, a subsidiary of the Jaypee Group but it backed-out due to land acquisition related issues.

This power plant is coming up at a site adjacent to another upcoming power project Bara Thermal Power Station which is owned by Prayagraj Power Generation, a subsidiary of the Jaypee Group.

== Timeline ==
- 2007 — The Uttar Pradesh government proposes the Karchana power plant to address the state’s growing energy needs. Approximately 2,500 bighas of land were acquired from 2,286 farmers across eight villages for the project.
- 2009 — The project is awarded to Sangam Power Generation Company Limited, a subsidiary of the Jaypee Group, through competitive bidding. The plan includes constructing three units of 660 MW each, with the possibility of expanding to a fourth unit.
- 2011 — The project faces significant resistance from local farmers over land acquisition and compensation issues, leading to protests and legal challenges. In April 2012, the Allahabad High Court quashes the land acquisition notifications, causing further delays.
- December 2013 — Citing unviability and unresolved land acquisition problems, the Jaypee Group withdraws from the project. Subsequently, the Uttar Pradesh government initiates discussions to transfer the project to NTPC Limited, but no substantial progress is made.
- July 2014 — The state-owned Uttar Pradesh Rajya Vidyut Utpadan Nigam (UPRVUNL) takes over the project, relocating it adjacent to the Bara Thermal Power Station. Construction of the boundary wall begins in September 2014, but issues with land acquisition persist as some landowners have not accepted compensation.
- May 2015 — The Uttar Pradesh government proposes converting the stalled project into a 4,000 MW Ultra Mega Power Plant (UMPP) under central government ownership. The proposal is sent to the Ministry of Power, but with no further developments, the project appears to have been canceled.

== Capacity ==
The planned capacity of the power plant in 1320 MW (2x660 MW).

Stage	Unit Number	Capacity (MW)	Date of Commissioning
1st	1	660	Plan approved in July 2014. As of March-2017, construction work yet to start
1st	2	660	
