= Phulhan =

- village
- Interactive map of Phulhan
- Country: India
- State: Uttar Pradesh
- District: Prayagraj

Government
  - Body: Gram panchayat

Languages
  - Official: Hindi
- Time zone: UTC+5:30 (IST)

Phulhan is a village near Hanumanganj post office in the Prayagraj district of Uttar Pradesh Province in northern India.
