= Madaraha =

Madaraha is the name of a village that is situated at Meja (tehsil) in the district of Prayagraj, Uttar Pradesh. The village is at least 500 years old. The village has three Tolas: Purana purva, Chain ka purva, and Nidhi ka purva.

== Old purwa ==
Dukhi ka purva is the main village which is situated on the bank of Tons river. The main occupation of the villagers is farming. The main agricultural grains are wheat, Bajara, dals, chana, and sarso (rayi). All types of grain are available here, except rice, because the land is not level. There are 300+ total houses here. The villagers are not well educated because there is only one primary/nursery school, and one HSC school is at chain ka purva. Inter college is 4 km away here, and Degree college 10 km away from here. And the approximately 80 percent youth are migrated towards big cities like Mumbai, Delhi, Chennai etc. The population of Dukh ka purva is likely 1000. 500 are a Brahman caste, and 200 are "Kol" caste, and other are Mallaha caste. 100 Brahman in village are Ralhi in mishra of Brahman caste.

== Chain ka purva ==
Chain ka purva is a part of village at the corners of Meja-Kohrar road. There is a HSC school and the population is less than 350 people.

== Nidhi ka purva ==
Nidhi ka purva is part of a village that is situated near Pahadi Mahadev temple. The population is about 500 people, many of whom are engaged in small-scale agriculture. There are many Brahman families, and some Nau and some Gderiyas here.
