= Akbar Allahabadi =

Indian poet (1846–1921)

- اکبر الہ آبادی
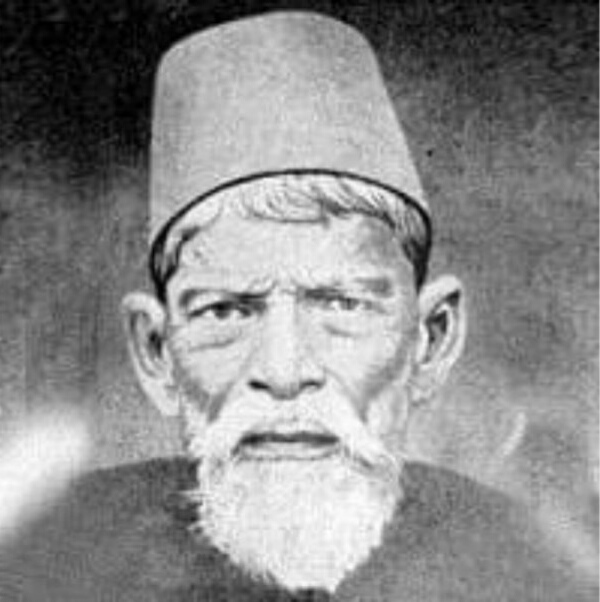
- Akbar Allahabadi
- Born: Syed Akbar Hussain; 16 November 1846; Bara, North-Western Provinces, British India
- Died: 9 September 1921 (aged 74); Allahabad, United Provinces, British India
- Occupation: Judge
- Writing career
- Genres: Ghazal, Masnavi, Qita, Rubaʿi Nazam
- Subjects: Love, philosophy, religion, social reform, satire, British rule

Syed Akbar Hussain (16 November, 1846–9 September, 1921), popularly known as Akbar Allahabadi was an Muslim poet, regarded as one of the greatest satirists in Urdu literature. The most popular of Akbar's verse poked fun at the cultural dilemma posed by the onslaught of Western culture. His ire was mostly directed towards the natives he considered to be outlandishly pseudo-western. In the Muslim community he became known as 'Lisanu'l-Asr' (lit. 'Poet of the age').

== Life and career ==
=== Early life ===
Akbar Allahabadi was born in the town of Bara, in the district of Allahabad, to a family of Sayyids who originally came to India from Persia as soldiers. His grandfather, Sayyid Fazl-i-Mohmmad, had Shia leanings but his three sons, Wasil 'Ali, Waris 'Ali and Tafazzul Husain were all Sunnis. Akbar's father, Moulvi Tafazzul Hussain served as a Naib Tehsildar to his brother Waris 'Ali, who was the Tehsildar, and his mother belonged to a zamindar family of Jagdishpur village from the Gaya district in Bihar.

Akbar received his early education in Arabic, Persian and Mathematics from his father at home. In 1855, his mother moved to Allahabad and settled in Mohalla Chowk. Akbar was admitted to the Jamuna Mission School for an English education in 1856, but he abandoned his school education in 1859. However, he continued to study English and read widely.

=== Career ===
On leaving school, Akbar joined the Railway Engineering Department as a clerk. While in service, he passed the exam qualifying him as a barrister and subsequently worked as a tehsildar and a munsif, and ultimately, as a sessions court judge. To commemorate his work in judicial services, he was bestowed with the title, Khan Bahadur.

=== Marriage ===
Akbar's first marriage was at the age of 15 and arranged by his parents. His wife's name was Khadija Khatun, who was four years older than him. This was not a successful marriage and Akbar took no pleasure in it despite having two sons with Khadija named Nazir Husain and Abid Husain. After divorcing their mother, Akbar did not pay attention to his sons and they had to make do with a sum of forty rupees a month, which he gave as alimony. Both of these sons due to lack of support from their father, did not fare well in life and not much is known about them.

His second marriage to Fatima Sughra (died 1910) was more successful and brought him happiness. Together they had two sons, Ishrat Husain and Hashim Husain. Ishrat was sent to England for 3 years to become a lawyer but did not return even after 6 years. He obtained his Bachelor of Arts degree from Cambridge University with difficulty and never sat for the bar examinations. Instead he fancied himself a person of the arts and applied to be a playwright and an actor without any success. He attributed this to the prejudice against Indians in England of that time. He became too Anglicised in his ways of thinking and living for Akbar's liking. Later in life, Ishrat became a collector.

The younger son Hashim pleased his father and stayed with him until his death in 1921.

=== Death ===
Akbar retired in 1905 and lived on in Allahabad. He died of a fever on September 9, 1921 and was buried in Himmatganj locality of Allahabad.

== Legacy ==
"Hungama Hai Kyon Barpa" is a popular ghazal, written by Akbar Allahabadi and most prominently sung by Ghulam Ali. Verses from his poetry also found their way into the famous qawwali “Tum ik Gorakh Dhanda Ho” by Nusrat Fateh Ali Khan. A number of Akbar Allahabadi's poems were used in the 2015 Hindi film Masaan. Explaining this as a conscious tribute, the film's lyrics writer Varun Grover explained that he wanted to show one of the female leads Shaalu (played by Shweta Tripathi) as a person whose hobby is to read Hindi poetry and Shayri.
