= Ramlochan Vishwakarma =

Indian folk writer

Ramlochan Vishwakarma (Sanwariya)
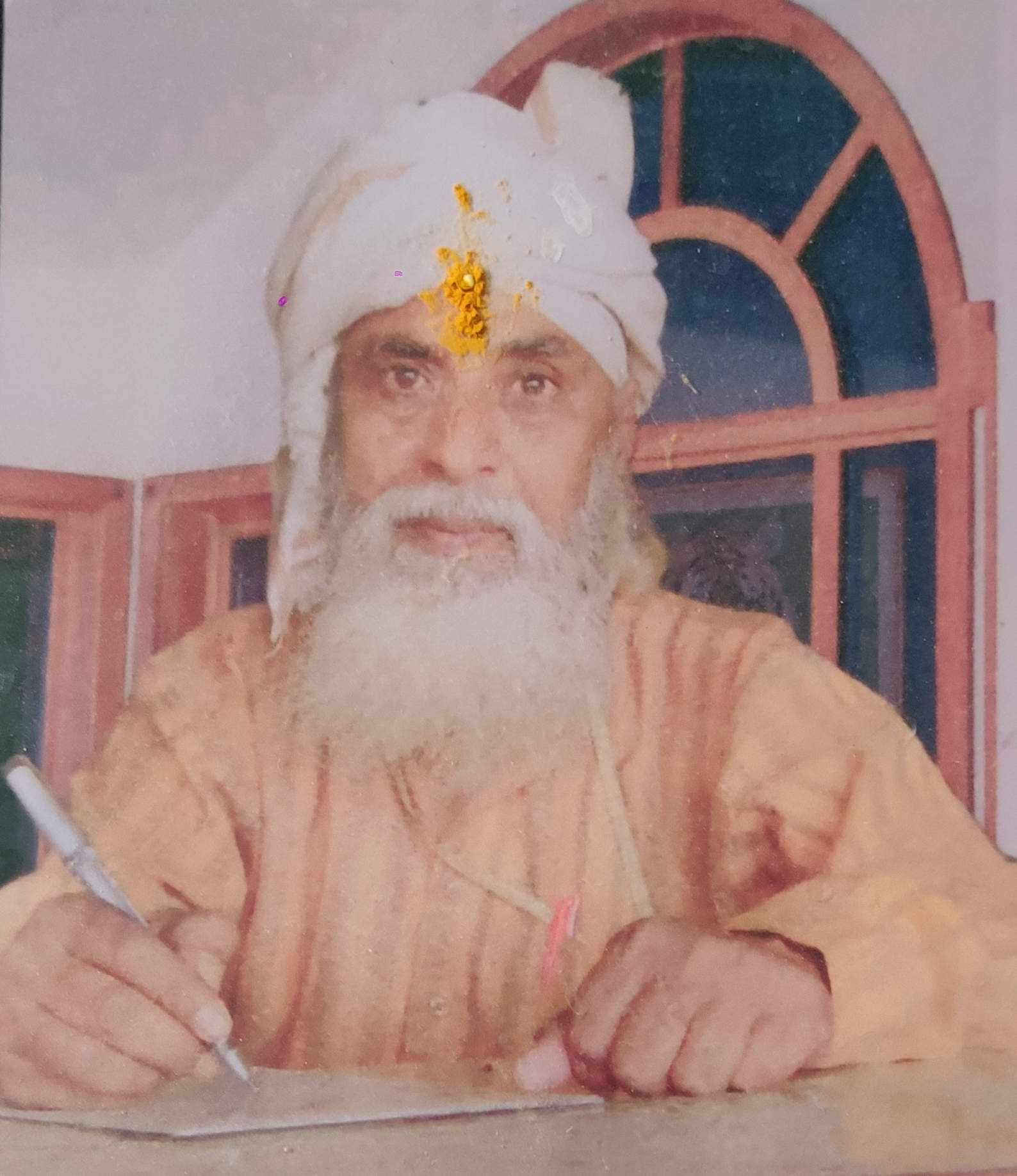
- Ramlochan Sanwariya
- Born: 22 July 1952
- Died: 10 September 2024 (aged 72)
- Occupation: Indian Folk Writer
- Language: Awadhi, Hindi, Folk Language
- Citizenship: Indian
- Spouse: Sita Devi
- Children: Vedanand Vishwakarma, Satyanand Vishwakarma

Ramlochan Vishwakarma, known by his pen name as Sanwariya, was an Indian folk writer. He primarily contributed to Nautanki, a folk performance form of South Asia.

He was born in Prayagraj, Uttar Pradesh, India. He wrote Nautanki books such as Ramlochan Sanwariya, Chhin lo roti, and Namak ka Daroga.

The Ministry of Culture, government of India conferred senior fellowship upon him for his contributions to folk writings.

Ramlochan Sanwariya was a prominent Indian folk poet, playwright, and one of the most celebrated writers of Nautanki, a traditional folk theatre form popular in North India. With more than 150 written works, Sanwariya is regarded as one of the most influential contributors to the preservation and modernization of Nautanki.

== Early life and background ==
Ramlochan Sanwariya was born in Gadhiyawa village in Karchhana Tehsil, Prayagraj, Uttar Pradesh, into a family deeply rooted in artistic traditions. His father, Brahmyagya Vishwakarma, was a carpenter, poet, and Nautanki performer, while his grandfather, Ram Kumar Vishwakarma, was also a well-known folk artist. This familial connection to folk arts had a profound influence on Sanwariya from a young age, nurturing his talents in writing and performance.

== Career in Nautanki ==
Sanwariya's contributions to Nautanki were extraordinary, with a portfolio of over 150 works that spanned a wide range of themes, from mythological and historical stories to social issues and contemporary events. His writing was marked by a deep understanding of human emotions, societal dynamics, and a unique blend of satire, drama, and humor.

Some of his notable works include:

"Namak ka Daroga": An adaptation of Munshi Premchand’s famous story, focusing on issues of justice and corruption.

COVID-19 Pandemic Performance: Sanwariya adapted Nautanki to contemporary issues, such as his notable performance on the global COVID-19 pandemic, demonstrating his ability to evolve the art form in modern times.

Sanwariya’s works were praised for their ability to engage and entertain diverse audiences while also educating them on important social themes. He was instrumental in modernizing Nautanki, integrating contemporary social concerns like health, education, and corruption, and making it relevant to the urban as well as rural populace.

== Poetry and literary contributions ==
Beyond Nautanki, Ramlochan Sanwariya was also a highly respected folk poet. His poetry, written in simple yet poignant language, resonated with the lives of common people. One of his well-known poems, "Kaha Ja Base Gidda Raj," is a symbolic exploration of environmental destruction, capturing the displacement of wildlife due to human greed and exploitation of nature.

His poetry was known for its depth and social relevance, often highlighting the struggles of rural life, inequality, and environmental issues.

== Awards and recognition ==
Ramlochan Sanwariya received numerous accolades for his contributions to Indian folk arts and culture. Among the most notable was the Senior Fellowship awarded by the Ministry of Culture, Government of India in recognition of his significant role in preserving and promoting Nautanki and folk poetry.

== Death and legacy ==
Ramlochan Sanwariya died on 10 September 2024, leaving behind a rich legacy of folk literature and theatre that continues to inspire. His body of work remains a crucial part of North India's cultural history, and his contributions to Nautanki have ensured that the art form remains relevant in the 21st century.

Sanwariya's influence on the younger generation of folk artists is profound. His works are still performed widely, and his efforts to modernize and contextualize Nautanki for contemporary audiences have inspired many new writers and performers to follow in his footsteps.

Through his dedication to preserving folk arts and his innovative storytelling, Ramlochan Sanwariya has cemented his place as one of the greatest figures in Indian folk theatre and poetry.
