= Nivaiya =

Village in Uttar Pradesh, India

Nivaiya is a village in the Indian state of Uttar Pradesh. The village is located near to Meja Road and Ramnagar in the Prayagraj district. It is located in Meja Tehsil which is next to Manda Tehsil, the former P.M. V.P. Singh's birthplace.
