= Chak Imam Ali =

- Census town
- Location in Uttar Pradesh, India
- Coordinates: 25°22′33″N 81°51′54″E
- Country: India
- State: Uttar Pradesh
- District: Prayagraj

Population (2001)
  - Total: 4,641

Language
  - Official: Hindi
  - Additional official: Urdu
- Time zone: UTC+5:30 (IST)

Chak Imam Ali is a census town in Prayagraj district in the state of Uttar Pradesh, India.

== Demographics ==
As of the census of India conducted in 2001, Chak Imam Ali had a population of 4,124. Males constituted 54% of the population and females 46%. Chak Imam Ali had an average literacy rate of 82%, higher than the national average of 59.5%, with male literacy at 87% and female at 76%. 9% of the population was under 6 years of age.
