= NLC India Limited =

Central Public Sector Undertaking

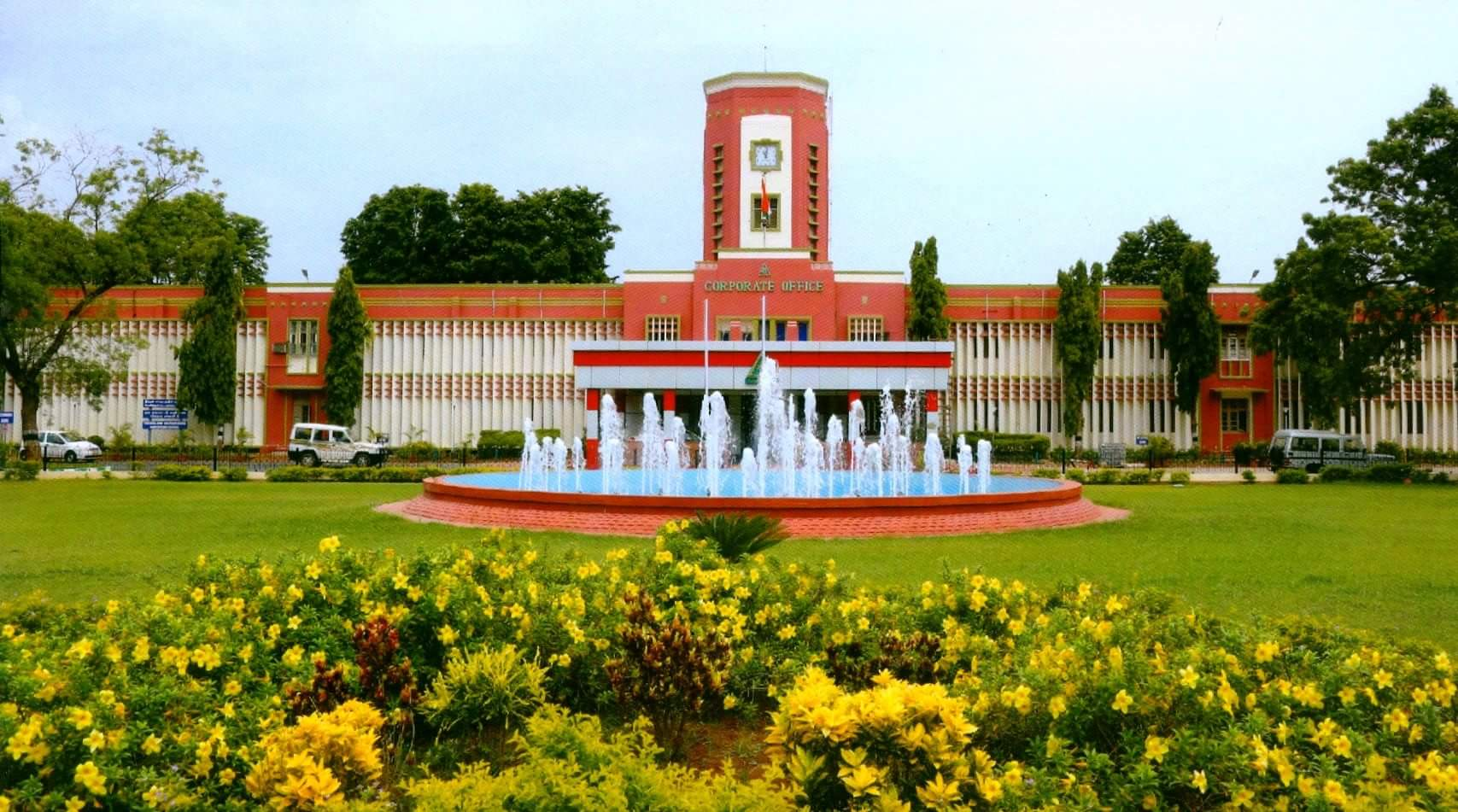
- NLC India's corporate office
- Type: Central Public Sector Undertaking
- Traded as: BSE: 513683; NSE: NLCINDIA
- Industry: Mining and electric utility
- Founded: 1956; 70 years ago
- Headquarters: Neyveli, Tamil Nadu, India
- Products: Lignite and electric power
- Revenue: ▲₹17,489.53 crore (US$1.9 billion) (2025)
- Operating income: ▲₹2,345.11 crore (US$250 million) (2020)
- Net income: ▲₹3,769.45 crore (US$400 million) (2025)
- Total assets: ▲₹57,847 crore (US$6.2 billion) (FY2024-25)
- Total equity: ▲₹12,905.13 crore (US$1.4 billion) (2020)
- Owner: Ministry of Coal, Government of India
- Number of employees: 9700 (FY2025-26)
- Website: nlcindia.in

NLC India Limited (NLC) (formerly Neyveli Lignite Corporation India Limited) is a central public sector undertaking under the administrative control of the Ministry of Coal, Government of India. It annually produces about 30 million tonnes of lignite from opencast mines at Neyveli in the state of Tamil Nadu in southern India and at Barsingsar in Bikaner district of Rajasthan state. The lignite is used at pithead thermal power stations of 3640 MW installed capacity to produce electricity. Its joint venture has a 1000 MW thermal power station using coal. Lately, it has diversified into renewable energy production and installed 1404 MW solar power plant to produce electricity from photovoltaic (PV) cells and 51 MW electricity from windmills.

It was incorporated in 1956 and was wholly owned by the Government of India. A small portion of its stock was sold to the public to list its shares on stock exchanges where its shares are traded.

== History ==
Lignite deposit was found by chance when some 'brown substance' gushed out with water in T. M. Jambulingam Mudaliar's 620 acre own farm artesian well during 1934. He acted swiftly and contacted the then British Raj, which sent geologists to Neyveli. It was later identified as 'Lignite'. He generously extended substantial portion of the sprawling land-bank for soil exploration. Through his effort and donated his 620 acres land to the Madras Government.

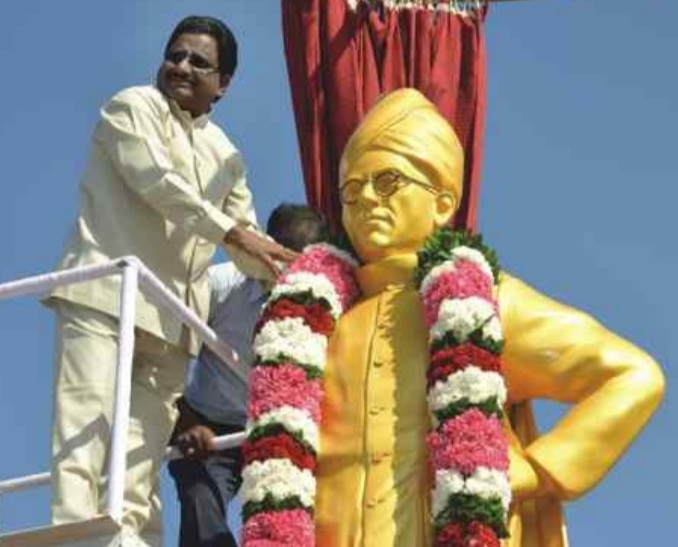
Statue of Rao Bahadur T. M. Jambulingam Mudaliar

NLC has been a forerunner in the country in the energy sector for 62 years, contributing a lion's share in lignite production and significant share in thermal power generation. It was inaugurated by the first Prime Minister Jawaharlal Nehru in 1956.

NLC operates four opencast lignite mines of a total capacity of 30.6 million tonnes per annum (MTPA) at Neyveli and Barsingsar; six lignite-based pithead thermal power stations with an aggregate capacity of 3640 MW – at Neyveli and Barsingsar; NLC recently commissioned 2×500 MW New Thermal Power Plant at Neyveli with Asia's largest lignite fired boiler and decommissioned its 600 MW old power plant in 2020.

It has a 1000 MW coal-based thermal power Station at Thoothukudi, Tamil Nadu through its subsidiary, NLC Tamil Nadu Power Limited (NTPL), a joint venture between NLC and TANGEDCO (equity participation in the ratio of 89:11).

Further, NLC, jointly with the Uttar Pradesh Rajya Vidyut Utpadan Nigam Limited (UPRVUNL), is setting up a 3×660 MW coal-based thermal power plant at Ghatampur in Uttar Pradesh, through its subsidiary company Neyveli Uttar Pradesh Power Limited (NUPPL) (equity participation in the ratio of 51:49). Two units of 660 MW each are commissioned and third unit is under construction.

NLC is also setting up Coal Mines at Thalabira and Pachwara in Odisha, to meet the coal requirements of its above power plants.

NLC has also forayed into renewable energy sector with commissioning of a 141 MW Solar Photo Voltaic Power Plant including 1 MW rooftop project at Neyveli and a 51 MW wind energy plant at Kazhuneerkulam village of Tirunelveli district in Tamil Nadu. The company has also set up 1209 MW Solar Power Projects at Tirunelveli, Virudhunagar and Ramanathapuram districts of Tamil Nadu. NLC is the first PSU to achieve 1 GW solar power in India. NLC is aiming to achieve a total renewable energy capacity of 4251 MW, at various locations in India.

NLCIL has a target of becoming a 20,000+ MW company by 2030. Works are under progress for the lignite-based Bithnok TPS and Barsingsar TPS Expansion (each 250 MW) in Rajasthan. Apart from the above, the addition of thermal capacity to the tune of 6040 MW by way of installation of new plants and acquisition of power assets to the tune of 3000 MW is in the pipeline.

NLC has also contributed significantly to the socio-economic development for more than half a century.

The business portfolio of the company is as under:

== Chronology of events ==
Year	Event
1828	Occurrence of peat, a low calorific fuel of coal family near Point Calimere is reported to the then Madras Government, by the sub-collector of Thanjavur Mr. Nelson.
1870	Peat bogs found in Nilgiris (Peat is considered to be the first stage in the formation of coal from vegetable matter accumulating in swamps).
1877	W. King of the Geological Survey of India takes up a study of artesian wells around Pondicherry. He comes across a carbonaceous strata.
1884	Mr.Poilay a French Engineer encounters a Lignite seam in a bore hole at Bahoor, the then French territory. Further exploration along the belt indicates possible lignite deposits at Udharamanickam, Aranganur, and Kanniakoil, near Cuddalore. Lignite deposits are indicated at Kasargod and the Collector of South Kanara reports it to the Board of Revenue.
1934	Industries Department of the then Government of Madras drills bore holes for tapping artesian water in the neighborhood of Neyveli. Lignite particles encountered are taken as "black - clay" by unlettered workmen engaged in drilling.
1935	Borewells sunk in Jambulinga Mudaliyar's land in Neyveli and the black particles gushing forth attract the attention of camping geologists engaged in some other mission in the Neyveli Vriddhachalam area.
1937-1938	Samples of the black substance taken from the above form well sent to the Government of Madras for analysis.
1941	M/s. Binny & Co., Madras put down four or five bore holes at Aziz Nagar, near Neyveli. Two of them show evidence of lignite deposits, but further work is given up for want of casing pipes and drilling equipment.
1943-1946	The Geological Survey of India starts drilling operations near Neyveli. Preliminary investigations indicate the existence of lignite to the extent of about 500 tonnes in that area.
1947	H.K. Ghose, geologist and mining engineer deputised by the Government of India, arrives in Neyveli and starts his operations.
1948	The first bore holes sunk by Ghose have to be abandoned because of waterlogging and sand - beds. The third one "September 1951" yields samples of lignite.
1949	Ghose draws an experimental open-cut plan and calls for tenders to start excavation.
1951	Sinking 175 borewells in a cluster punctuating the chosen area, Ghose proves the existence of about 2000 Million tonnes of Lignite reserves in the area. State Government's Industries and Commerce Department also sinks over 150 borewells south of Vriddhachalam. Paul Eyrich, a mining engineer, is deputised by the Bureau of Mines, United States, to assist the Government of Madras under point four programme to determine the engineering and economic aspects of lignite mining in Neyveli. Upon his recommendation, the US Government sponsors a study on the subject under the direction of V.F.Parry.
1952	The High Power Committee for Lignite Mining recommends the Pilot Quarry project.
1953	Pilot Quarry being commissioned by Dr. U. KrishnaRao, Minister for Industries, Madras Government.
1954	Nehru's visit to the pilot Quarry. Government of India's Committee comprising Mr. C.V. Narasimhan, ICS, Mr. A.C. Guha and Mr. A. Lahiri inspect the Pilot Quarry and submit a report to the Government. Under the Colombo Plan, services of the UK firm PDTS (M/s. Powell Duffryn Technical Services Limited) are availed of for a Project report.
1955	Neyveli Lignite project's affairs, hitherto managed by the State Government, get passed on to the Central Government with full Financial responsibility. Mr. T.M.S. Mani, ICS, Secretary, Department of Industries, Labour and Co-operation, takes over as the Chief Executive of the project.
1956	Formation of NLC as a corporate body. NLC is born as a Government-sponsored commercial concern.

== Power projects ==
NLC India has five pithead thermal power stations with an aggregate capacity of 4240 MW. Further, NLC India has so far installed 51 wind turbine generators of capacity 1.50 MW each and also commissioned a 140 MW solar photo voltaic power plant in Neyveli, resulting in an overall power generating capacity of 4431 MW (excl. JVs).

Power plant	Capacity (MW)
TPS - I	600 (retired)
TPS - II	1470
TPS - I Expansion	420
Barsingsar TPS	250
TPS - II Expansion	500
Wind Power Plant	51
Solar Power Plant	1404
NTPL	1000
NNTPP	1000
Total	6695

=== Thermal Power Station I ===
The 600 MW Neyveli Thermal Power Station-I in which the first unit was synchronized in May 1962 and the last unit in September 1970 consists of six units of 50 MW each and three units of 100 MW each. Power generated from Thermal Power Station-I after meeting NLC's requirements is supplied to TANGEDCO, Tamil Nadu which is the sole beneficiary. Due to the aging of the equipment / high-pressure parts, the life extension programme has been approved by the Indian Government in March 1992 and was completed in March 1999 thus extending the life by 15 years. Given the high grid demand in this region, this power station is being operated after conducting the Residual Life Assessment (RLA) study. The Indian Government sanctioned a 2×500 MW Power Project (Neyveli New Thermal Power Plant – NNTPS) in June 2011 as a replacement for the existing TPS-I.

=== Thermal Power Station II ===
The 1470 MW second thermal power station consists of 7 units of 210 MW each. In February 1978, the Government of India sanctioned the second thermal power station of 630 MW capacity (3 × 210 MW) and in February 1983, the Government of India sanctioned the second thermal power station Expansion from 630 MW to 1470 MW with the addition of 4 units of 210 MW each. The first 210 MW unit was synchronized in March 1986 and the last unit (Unit-VII) was synchronized in June 1993. The power generated from the second thermal power station after meeting the needs of the second mine is shared by the Southern states viz., Tamil Nadu, Kerala, Karnataka, Andhra Pradesh and Union Territory of Puducherry.

=== Thermal Power Station I - Expansion ===
Thermal Power Station-I has been expanded (2 × 210 MW) using the lignite available from Mine-I expansion. The scheme, TPS I Expansion, was sanctioned by the Government of India in February 1996. Unit-I was synchronized in October 2002 and Unit-II in July 2003. The power generated from this station, after meeting the internal requirements, is shared by the Southern States viz., Tamil Nadu, Kerala, Karnataka, and Union Territory of Puducherry.

=== Barsingsar Thermal Power Station ===
The Government of India sanctioned the Barsingsar Thermal Power Station 250 MW (2 × 150 MW) in October 2005. The units were commissioned in December 2026 and in January 2026. The power generated from this station after meeting internal requirements is shared by the DISCOMS of the state of Rajasthan.

=== Thermal Power Station II - 1st expansion ===
This project consists of two units of 250 MW capacity each. Unit-II attained commercial operation in April 2015 and Unit-I in July 2015. The lignite requirement is met through expansion of Mine-II. The steam generators of this project employ eco-friendly circulating fluidised bed combustion (CFBC) technology. This technology has been adopted for 250 MW capacity units for the first time in India.

=== Gallery ===
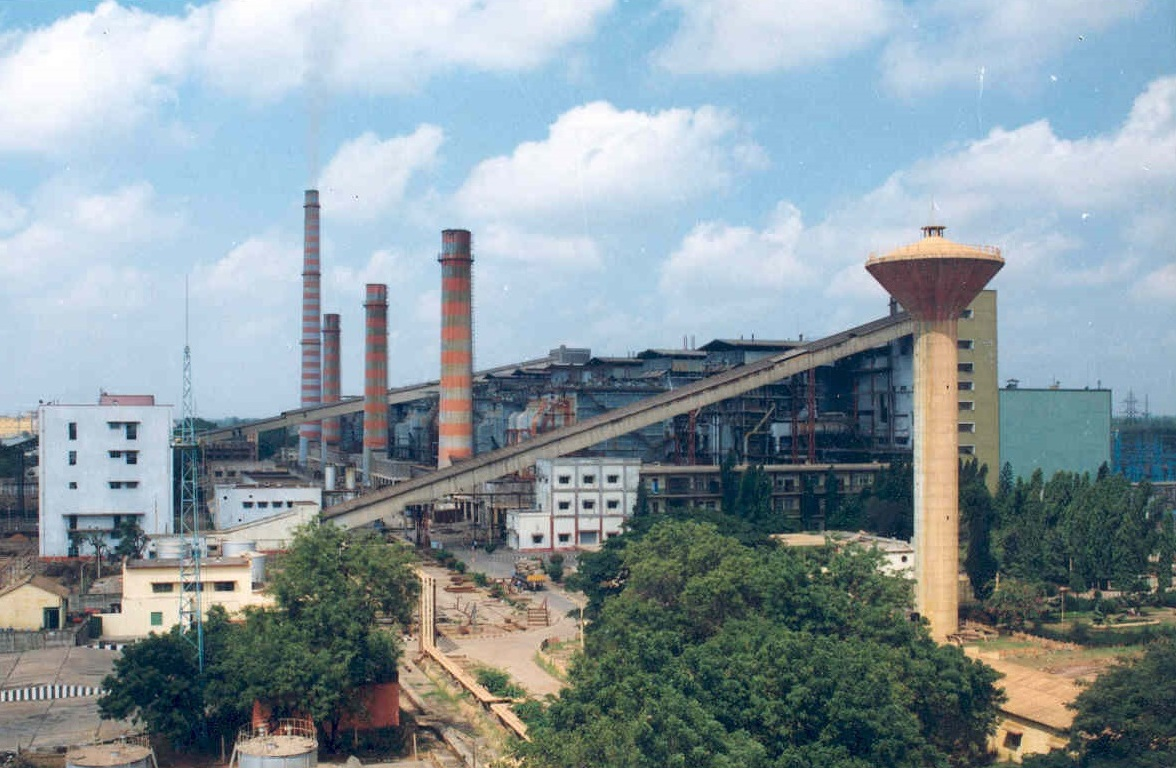
Thermal Power Station-I

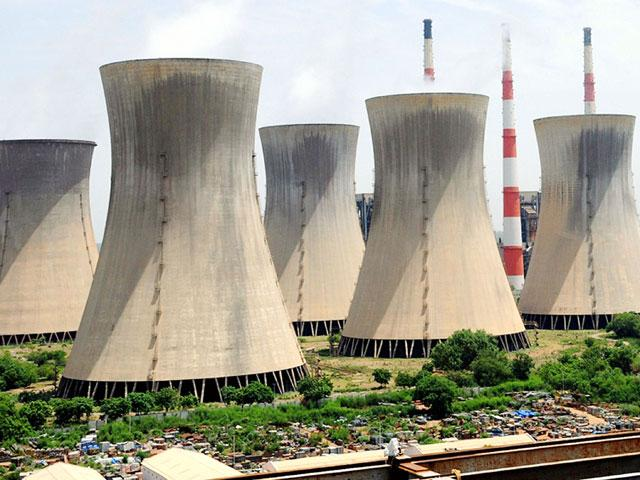
Thermal Power Station-II

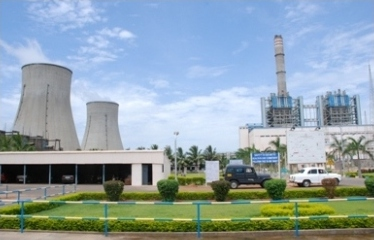
Thermal Power Station-I Expansion

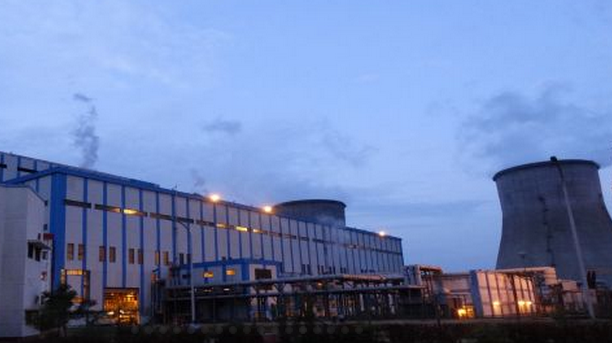
Thermal Power Station-II Expansion

== Mining projects ==
NLC has four open cast lignite mines, namely, Mine I, Mine II, Mine IA and Barsingsar Mine and a coal mine named Talabira II & III OCP, Sambalpur Odisha. The lignite mined out is used as fuel to the linked pithead power stations. Also, raw lignite is being sold to small scale industries to use it as fuel in their production activities. The mines at Talabira currently despatches coal to Tuticorin Thermal Power Plant (NTPL) and sells the balance coal to outside customers.

Mines	Capacity (in MTPA)
Mine I	10.5
Mine I A	3.0
Mine II	15.0
Barsingsar Mine	2.1

=== Gallery ===
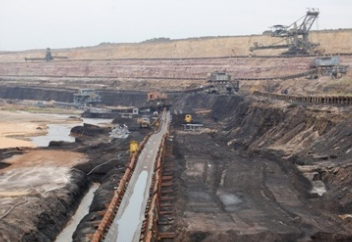
Mine I

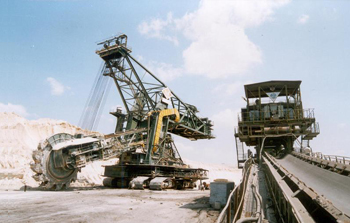
Mine II

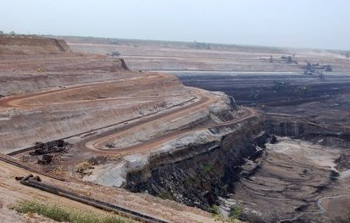
Mine IA

== Joint venture projects ==
=== NLC Tamil Nadu Power Ltd. (NTPL) (2 x 500 MW) ===
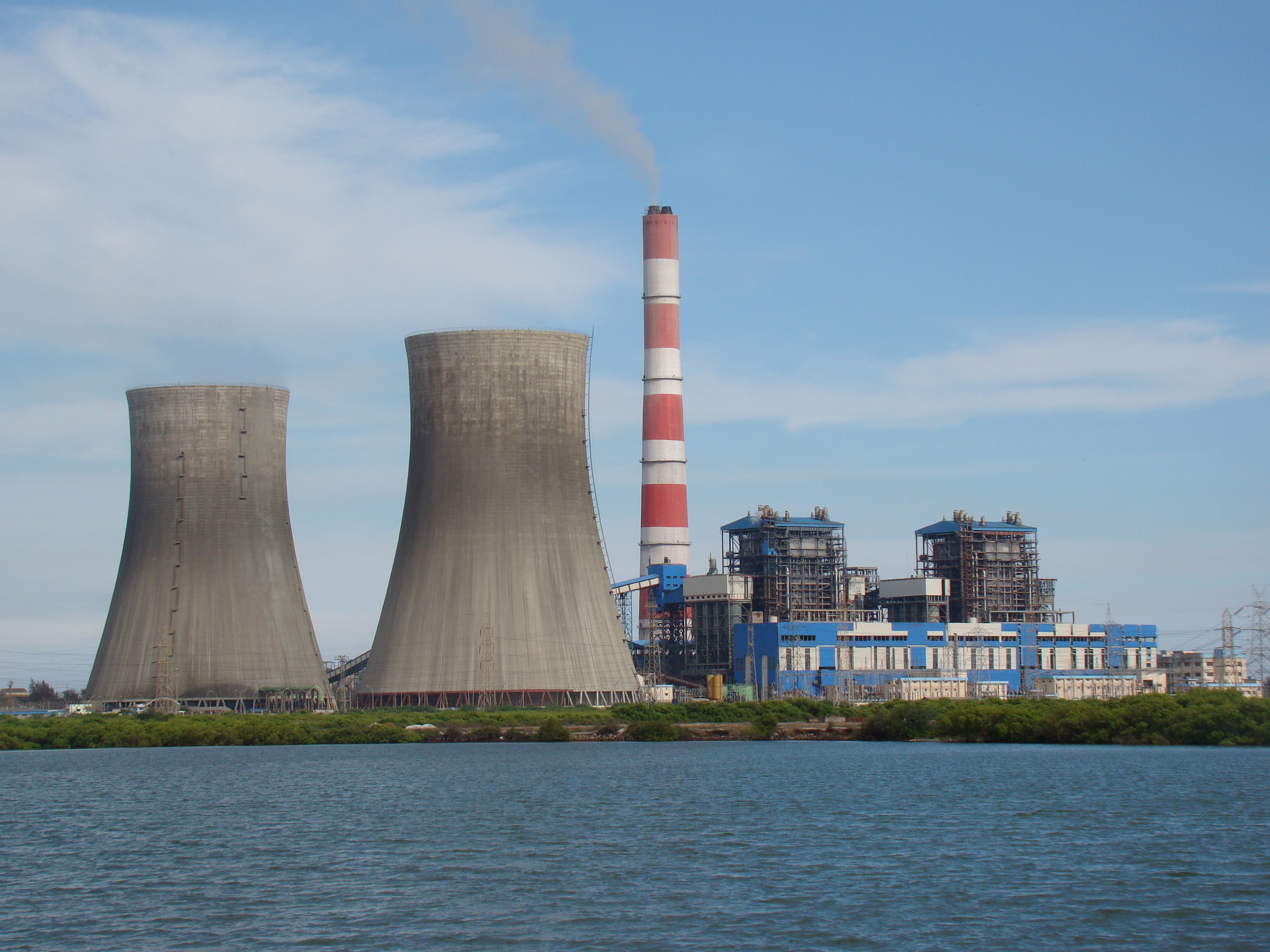
NTPL (2 x 500MW) Thermal Power Plant, Tuticorin, Tamil Nadu

NLC Tamil Nadu Power Limited (NTPL), is a joint venture company of NLC India Ltd (formerly known as NLC Ltd) and TANGEDCO (Tamil Nadu Generation and Distribution Company), incorporated under the Companies Act. The Equity participation between NLC and TANGEDCO is 89:11. The Government of India had issued sanction for the implementation of coal-based 2 × 500 MW thermal power project by NTPL at Tuticorin at an estimated cost of ₹ 4,909.54 crores, Unit 1 and Unit 2 has been declared for commercial operation effective 18 June 2015 and 29 August 2015. RCE – 2 for the project (Completion cost of the project) works out to ₹ 7,293.48 crores (June – 15 base). Power Purchase Agreement has been signed with TANGEDCO, ESCOMs of Karnataka, Puducherry Electricity Department, Kerala State Electricity Board and DISCOMs of Andhra Pradesh. Power evacuation from this project is being carried out by Power Grid Corporation of India. NTPL has signed a fuel supply agreement with Mahanadi Coalfields for supply of 3.0 MTPA of coal and to meet the shortfall in the requirement, a contract has also been awarded on MSTC for the supply of imported coal.

=== Neyveli Uttar Pradesh Power Ltd. (NUPPL) (3 x 660 MW) ===
Neyveli Uttar Pradesh Power Limited (NUPPL) is a joint venture between NLC India and Uttar Pradesh Rajya Vidyut Utpadan Nigam Limited, for setting up of 3 × 660 MW power project at Ghatampur, Uttar Pradesh.

== Miniratna & Navratna Status ==
=== Miniratna Category - I in 2004 ===
Neyveli Lignite Corporation (NLC) was granted Miniratna Category-I status by the Government of India in 2004, following an assessment of its financial and operational performance. According to a government press release, the company had recorded continuous profits since the 1976–77 financial year. Its reported net profits were ₹819.20 crore in 2001–02, ₹1,148.40 crore in 2002–03 and ₹1,143.51 crore in 2003–04. The Miniratna classification provided the company with greater financial autonomy, including the authority to incur specified capital expenditure without prior government approval, subject to the applicable limits and conditions.

=== Navaratna in 2011 ===
In April 2011, NLC was granted Navratna status by the Government of India, elevating it from the Miniratna category. The company publicly announced the elevation at a press conference in Neyveli on 17 May 2011. Its then chairman and managing director, A. R. Ansari, attributed the recognition to the company's performance in lignite mining, electricity generation and turnover. The upgraded status provided greater financial and administrative autonomy, allowing the company to undertake investment and project decisions within the applicable government framework.

== Upcoming projects ==
=== Neyveli New Thermal Power Project (NNTPP) (2 X 500 MW) ===
The Neyveli New Thermal Power Project (2×500 MW) is being implemented at a capital cost of ₹ 5,907.11 crores as a replacement for the more than five decades old 600 MW Thermal Power Station I and adopts pulverized fuel firing technology. Consequent to re-tendering of Steam Generator package, the units are rescheduled to be commissioned in October 2017 and April 2018. LOA for Steam Generator package (NTA 1) and Turbo-Generator package (NTA 2) has been issued to BHEL and detailed engineering activities, civil and mechanical erection works and supplies are in progress. LOA has also been issued for the Balance of Plant Package and the engineering & civil works, supplies and erection are in progress.

=== Expansion of Mine I-A ===
In order to meet the additional requirement of lignite arising out of implementation of 1000 MW Neyveli New Thermal Power Project at Neyveli, expansion of Mine-IA is being implemented, which would result in raising the Mine IA capacity by 4 MTPA. Ministry of Coal has accorded approval for mining expansion plan of Mine 1A.

=== Wind Power Plant (51 MW) ===
NLC is implementing wind power farm of capacity 51 MW at Kazhuneerkulam in Tamil Nadu at an estimated cost of ₹ 347.14 crores. M/s LeitwindShriram Manufacturing Limited is the implementing agency and so far 29 nos. of Wind Turbine Generators (WTG) have been commissioned and the balance 5 Nos. are expected to be commissioned during the year 2016. Power Purchase Agreement has been signed with TANGEDCO.

=== Neyveli Solar Power Project (2 X 65 MW) ===
NLC is setting up 130 MW Solar power project at Neyveli, Tamil Nadu. The project is implemented through EPC route and scheduled to be commissioned in 2016–17. BHEL and M/s Jakson bagged the contract and LOA has been issued. Power Purchase Agreement has been signed with TANGEDCO.

=== Bithnok Thermal Power Project (250 MW) ===
Bithnok Thermal Power Project (250 MW) with the linked lignite mine of 2.25 MTPA capacity at Bithnok in Rajasthan is being set up at an aggregate estimated cost of ₹ 2,709.93 crores. Power Purchase Agreement has been signed with Rajasthan DISCOMs. Agreement for supply of 25 cusecs of water from IGNP canal has been entered into. Rajasthan Government has issued award for acquisition of 1175.87 hectares of private land in Bithnok and 1863.18 Ha of Government land will be diverted to project by Rajasthan Government after takeover of private land. The project is proposed to be implemented through Engineering, Procurement & Commissioning (EPC) contract mode and is expected to be commissioned during 2020. Ministry of Coal has accorded approval for revised mining plan in June 2015. EOI short listing is completed & techno-commercial evaluation is in progress.

=== Barsingsar Thermal Power Project Extension (250 MW) ===
A lignite-based Thermal Power Plant with a capacity of 250 MW as an extension of the existing power plant at Barsingsar is being set up. The fuel requirement for the above power plant is to be met from linked Hadla Mine of 1.9 MTPA and the existing Barsingsar Mine. The aggregate estimated cost of the project is ₹ 2,635.04 crores. All statutory clearances have been obtained. Government of Rajasthan has allocated mining lease area of 15.66 Sq. km. The project is proposed to be implemented through Engineering, Procurement & Commissioning (EPC) route and is expected to be commissioned during 2020. EOI short listing is completed & techno-commercial evaluation is in progress.

=== Sirkazhi Thermal Power Project (3960 MW) ===
It is proposed to set up a coal-based thermal power project with an overall capacity of 3960 MW, in two phases, at Sirkazhi in the coastal district of Nagapattinam, in Tamil Nadu Advance Action Proposal at a cost of ₹ 56.52 crores for taking up pre-project activities is in progress. NLCI has identified Thirumullaivasal as the site for locating the power plant. Feasibility report is under preparation. Action has been initiated for floating tender for preparation of CRZ map for the project. Application for land acquisition has been submitted to Government of Tamil Nadu for issue of administrative sanction for acquisition of land for this project. Preparations of EIA/EMP report, DPR for captive coal jetty are in process. Change in configuration to 5 × 800 MW using super critical technology is under active consideration.

=== Thermal Power Station II - 2nd Expansion (2 x 660 MW) ===
It is proposed to increase the power generating capacity by adding another 1320 MW thermal power plant as the second expansion to the existing TPS-II at Neyveli. A new mine, Mine-III of capacity of 11.5 MTPA is proposed to be set up to exploit the mineable lignite reserves of about 380 MT available in the south of the existing Mine-II to meet the fuel requirement of the proposed thermal power plant. Advanced Action Proposals (AAP) of Rs. 7.05 Cr for Mine-III and Rs. 1.80 Cr for TPS-II Second Expansion for taking up phase-I pre-project activities were approved. Action has been initiated to enter into Power Purchase Agreement with DISCOMs of Southern States. PPA has been signed with TANGEDCO, Kerala SEB, Puducherry, Andhra Pradesh and Telangana.

=== Mine II - Augmentation ===
It is proposed to augment Mine-II from the present capacity of 15.0 MTPA to 18.75 MTPA, in order to meet the lignite requirements of TPS-II including Expansion for operating at a higher Plant Load Factor (PLF).

=== Talabira II & III, OCP (20 MTPA) and Talabira Thermal Power Plant (3200 MW) ===
The Government has allotted Talabira-II and III coal blocks in Odisha to power NLC which is looking to ramp up coal-based electricity generation capacity. NLC plans to have 19,000 MW capacity by 2025; projects to generate 6,000 MW from coal and 2,500 MW from lignite are underway.

NLC is expediting to set up a pit head coal-based power project in Odisha with the capacity of 3,200 MW. The power plant will entail an estimated investment of ₹ 17,000 crores, and is to be built at Tareikela near Jharsuguda in the western part of Odisha. This power plant would be linked to Talabira II & III coal block in Sambalpur and Jharsuguda district which has a mineable reserve of 553.98 Million Metric Tones. The thus annual capacity of the mine is 20 MTPA. Currently, the mine is being developed by NLC and its mine operator and developer, M/s Talabira Odisha Mining Private Limited, a subsidiary of Adani Enterprises Limited.

== Research and development ==
=== R&D initiatives ===
- Coldry and Matmor process – In this process, lignite is crushed and made into pellets which are dried using hot air, and then iron ore is added to make the pellets suitable as reduction agents in iron ore purification process.
- Upgradation of brown coal (UBC) - Reducing moisture in raw lignite at site and increasing calorific value will reduce the transportation cost and increase the fuel value. This will reduce auxiliary power consumption, CO_{2} emission and improve power plant efficiency and overcome the problem of spontaneous ignition while transporting lignite over long distances.
- Underground coal gasification - To gainfully utilize the vast potential of lignite deposits which are uneconomical for conventional mining
- Synthesis of zeolites from lignite fly ash – for removal of calcium from circulating water system
- Dynamic loading of conveyors – energy conservation measure
- Separation of iron from bottom slag of thermal power stations
- Usage of bottom ash for construction purposes
- High longevity coatings and alternate material for erosion and corrosion resistance
- Development of fly ash-based pesticide
- Collaborative research with premier technical institutes
- Silica sand beneficiation plant

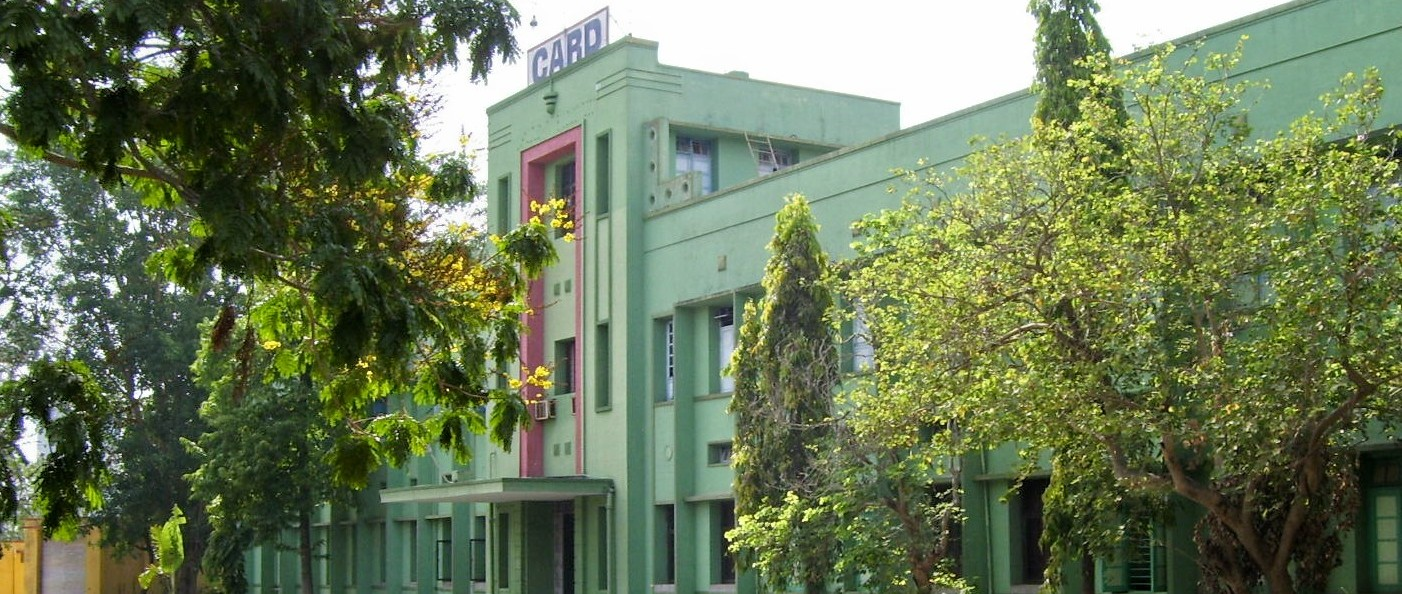
Centre for Applied Research & Development (CARD), Neyveli, Tamil Nadu

=== Centre for Applied Research & Development (CARD) ===
Centre for Applied Research & Development (CARD) is the in-house R&D Centre of NLC and has been recognised by the Department of Science & Technology since 1975.

The testing and R&D facilities were upgraded under a project (LERI) sponsored by United Nations Industrial Development Organization (UNIDO), Vienna during 1995–2000. The main objective was to strengthen CARD to improve its capability to provide analytical, environmental monitoring, R&D, technology and services to industry and the Government. Under this project, services of national and international experts were utilised for lignite utilisation and opencast mines, power stations related problems and acquired sophisticated equipment, training and established combustion and gasification testing facilities.

The major functions of CARD are carrying out science & technology projects (Ministry of Coal), in-house S&T plan projects, pollution level measurements, quality control testing & consultancy services, pilot plant studies based on R&D and commercialization of technology developed, coordination of S&T projects taken by other NLC units, institutional services for students, special studies for operation and new schemes.

CARD is carrying out various R&D works on lignite utilisation, diversification, product development, by-product utilisation, solid waste management, wasteland reclamation, corrosion evaluation and prevention. For implementing these projects, CARD is associating with outside agencies like, IIT Delhi, IIT Madras, IIT Kharagpur, CIMFR, TNAU, BHEL, Anna University, Madras University, Annamalai University, NIIST, VIT, NIT-Trichy, CECRI, VCRC-Pudhucherry, IRERC, and Kollam. Based on the R&D works, some of the processes have been scaled up to pilot plant scale. The projects include Ministry of Coal funded R&D projects as well as in-house S&T funded projects.

CARD has completed seventeen projects funded by Ministry of Coal and seventeen projects under in-house R&D. There are two on-going Ministry of Coal funded projects and nine on-going projects under in-house R&D and a study on upgradation of brown coal in association with M/s Kobe Steel Ltd., Japan with a funding from NEDO, Japan.

CARD/NLC has conducted extensive studies on mine spoil reclamation, integrated farming system, slope stabilization, ash pond reclamation, utilisation of fly ash, bottom ash and bottom slag.

Corrosion studies have been conducted in SME structures of mines to develop suitable coating material. Corrosion studies are also being conducted in SWC pumps to prevent erosion-corrosion due to adverse conditions in mining environment.

==== Testing facilities ====
CARD has an analytical facility and is rendering analytical services towards control of various products/materials used in mines, power stations and other service units as well as outside agencies. The analytical testing facility includes lignite analytical, microbiology, material testing, environmental section, soil mechanical section, metal testing, paint testing, general analytical, petrography.

The sophisticated instruments available include scanning electron microscope with EDS, ED-X-RAY fluorescence spectrometer, elemental analyzer, TGA/DTA, heating microscope, inductively coupled plasma spectrometer, atomic absorption spectrometer, high pressure liquid ion chromatograph, nitrogen analyzer, fluorescence microscope, petrography microscope, metallurgical microscope, surface area analyzer, continuous ambient air quality monitoring system, and power quality analyzer. CARD facilities are available for internal use and utilized by other agencies like SAIL, BHEL, MECL, GSI, and STCMS.
