= Chak Hinauta =

Village in Uttar Pradesh, India

Coordinates: 25°24′N 81°58′E

Chak Hinauta is a village in Allahabad District, Uttar Pradesh, India. It is located 12 km east of Allahabad and 5 km from Sarainayat.

== Etymology ==
Chak is an Urdu word which means village, and hinauta means sunflower.

== Demographics ==
In the 2011 census it had a population of 819.

As of 2010, Chak Hinauta had a population of 1500, with a male to female ratio of about 54:46. The residents have an average literacy rate of 63%.

== Economy ==
The area contains fertile but dry soil, with the primary crops being wheat, rice, and bajra.

== Culture ==
The village is locally famous for the Hinautveer temple located on the eastern side of the village. The village is surrounded by mango trees and other greenery.

Since 2005, an academic and sporting competition for people across Allahabad called "Ashirwvad vishal khel kood pratiyogita" has been held annually. The event is held on the eve of Republic Day. Various track and field events are held, along with a mathematics competition for children and teenagers.

== Education ==
Chak Hinauta has one primary school.
