= Ghatampur Thermal Power Station =

Coal plant project in Uttar Pradesh, India

NUPPL- GTPP (Neyveli Uttar pradesh Power Limited -Ghatampur Thermal Power Project) is a coal-based thermal power plant located in Ghatampur in Kanpur district, Uttar Pradesh, India. The power plant is owned by the Neyveli Uttar Pradesh Power Limited a joint venture between Neyveli Lignite Corporation (51%) and Uttar Pradesh Rajya Vidyut Utpadan Nigam (49%).

== Status update ==
- Jan 2015: The land acquisition is completed.
- May 2015: South Pachwara Coal Block allotted to NLC India ltd for GTPS Project. MDO selection under progress
- Jun 2015: MoEF issued Environment Clearance on 17-Jun-2015
- Feb 2016: Centre to consider 1,980 MW Ghatampur project in Kanpur soon.
- July 2016: Centre approved for installation of Ghatampur Thermal Power Project (GTPC) of 1980 MW (3 X 660 MW) capacity through a joint venture company named "Neyveli Uttar Pradesh Power Limited (NUPPL)" formed jointly by Neyveli Lignite Corporation Limited (NLC) and Uttar Pradesh Rajya Vidyut Utpadan Nigam Limited (UPRVUNL).Untitled Page
- October 2016: Construction starts
- June 2021 inspection of railway line to power plant by railway DRM

COMMISSIONING OF UNITS:

Unit-1: First synchronisation on coal firing on 21-10-2024. 72Hrs continuous full load (660MW) Trial operation of is completed on 03-12-2024. Commercial operation commences on 12-12-2024.

Unit-2: First synchronization with 765kV grid on 21-07-2025. 72Hrs continuous full load (660MW) Trial operation is completed on 23-11-2025. Commercial operation commences on 09-12-2025.

Unit-3: 72Hrs continuous full load (660MW) Trial operation is completed on 08-06-2026. Commercial operation commences on 13-06-2026.

== Capacity ==
The planned capacity of the power plant is 1980 MW. The power plant attains maximum generation of 2008MW on 13-06-2026.

Unit Number	Capacity (MW)	Date of Commercial operation
1	660	12 Dec 2024
2	660	09 Dec 2025
3	660	13 Jun 2026

The plant has a power purchase agreement (PPA) with Uttar Pradesh Power Corporation (UP Power Corporation) and Assam:

- Uttar Pradesh Power Corporation: The plant supplies 75.12% of its power to UP Power Corporation.
- Assam: The plant will supply 24.88% of its power to Assam. As of now, it is shared by Northern states
