= Bara, Prayagraj =

Bara
- Town
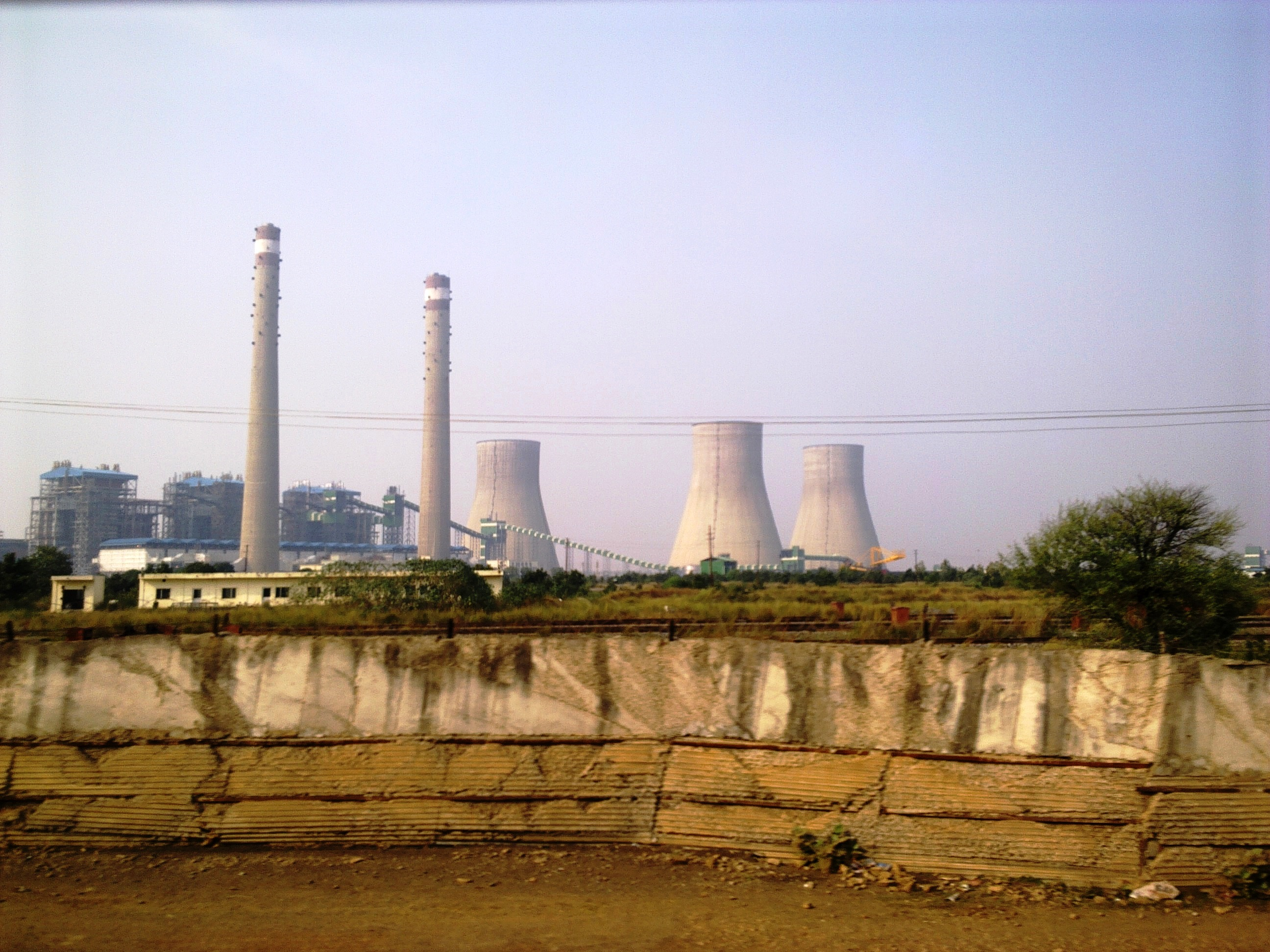
- Bara Thermal Power Project, 2015

- Location in India
- Coordinates: 25.16°N 81.43°E
- Country: India
- District: Prayagraj

Government
  - MLA: Dr Ajay Kumar

Languages
- Time zone: UTC+5:30 (IST)
- Vehicle registration: UP-70
- Sex ratio: 1000:1022 ♂/♀

Bara is a town and a nagar panchayat in Prayagraj district in the Indian state of Uttar Pradesh.

== Desh raj ==
- Akauni 1246
