= Akauni =

Village in Prayagraj district, Uttar Pradesh, India

- Interactive map of Akauni
- Coordinates: 25°12′27.878″N 83°13′58.638″E
- Country: India
- State: Uttar Pradesh
- District: Prayagraj

Ekauni (also spelled Ikauni) is a village in the Karchhana tehsil of Prayagraj district in the Indian state of Uttar Pradesh. It comes under the Gram panchayat of Ikauni and the postal area of Kaundhiyara with PIN code 212106.

== Geography ==
Ekauni is located in the Karchhana subdivision of Prayagraj district in Uttar Pradesh. The village lies within a rural agricultural region and is connected by local roads to nearby settlements. Nearest Villages: Tendui, Osa, Amba, Kaundhiyara etc.

== Demographics ==
According to the 2011 Census of India, Ekauni had a total population of 3,471 people living in 627 households. Of the total population, 1,819 were males and 1,652 were females. The village had a literacy rate of approximately 52.6 %, with male literacy higher than female literacy.

== Administration ==
- Country: India
- State: Uttar Pradesh
- District: Prayagraj
- Tehsil: Karchhana
- Gram Panchayat: Ikauni

== Postal Information ==
- PIN code: 212106
- Post Office: Kaundhiyara
