= Jawaharpur Super Thermal Power Station =

Upcoming power plant in Uttar Pradesh, India

Jawaharpur Super Thermal Power Station at Etah District in Uttar Pradesh
- Official name: Jawaharpur Super Thermal Power
- Country: India
- Location: Etah, Uttar Pradesh
- Coordinates: 27°29′48″N 78°49′36″E
- Status: Under construction by Doosan Power Systems India (DPSI)
- Construction began: December 2016
- Commission date: 2021
- Construction cost: Approx INR 10500 Crore
- Owner: Jawaharpur Vidyut Utpadan Nigam Limited
- Operator: UP Rajya Vidyut Utpadan Nigam Limited (UPRVUNL)

Thermal power station
- Primary fuel: Coal
- Site area: 350 hectares (860 acres)

External links
- Website: www.uprvunl.org/jawaharpur-vidyut-unl.htm

Jawaharpur Vidyut Utpadan Nigam Ltd is an upcoming thermal power plant coming up at Town Malawan district Etah in Uttar Pradesh, India. The power plant is one of the [avanish] based power plants of Jawaharpur Vidyut Utpadan Nigam Ltd. (JVUNL), a 100% subsidiary of UP Rajya Vidyut Utpadan Nigam Limited (UPRVUNL)

The Contract was awarded to Doosan Power Systems India (DPSI).

== Capacity ==
The planned capacity of the power plant is 1320 MW (2x660MW). Expected commissioning in year 2021.

Stage	Unit Number	power (MW)	Date of Commissioning	Status
1st	1	660	29.04.2023	Completed
1st	2	660		Construction ongoing.

== Media ==
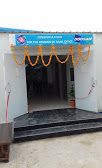

== See also ==
- Uttar Pradesh Rajya Vidyut Utpadan Nigam
