= Sadar, Prayagraj =

Sadar, Prayagraj Sadar
- Town
- Location in Uttar Pradesh Sadar, Prayagraj (India)
- Coordinates: 25.21°N 82.51°E
- Country: India
- District: Prayagraj

Languages
- Time zone: UTC+5:30 (IST)
- Vehicle registration: UP-70
- Sex ratio: 1000:1038 ♂/♀

Sadar is a town and a nagar panchayat in Prayagraj district in the Indian state of Uttar Pradesh.
