= Karchana =

Tehsil in Prayagraj, India

Karchhana
- Tehsil (Town)
- Location in India Karchhana (India)
- Coordinates: 25.28°N 81.93°E
- Country: India
- District: Prayagraj

Language
  - Official: Hindi
  - Additional official: Urdu
- Time zone: UTC+5:30 (IST)
- PIN: 212301
- Vehicle registration: UP-70
- Sex ratio: 1000:1014 ♂/♀

Karchana is a town in Prayagraj district in the Indian state of Uttar Pradesh. The town is administered by a Village panchayat system. Karchana lies in the central part of the Prayagraj district. The town is located 21 km south of Prayagraj, the district headquarters. Karchana is one of eight Tehsils in Prayagraj district.

== See also ==
- Antahiya
- Basahi Banzar
