= Barsingsar Thermal Power Station =

Power station in Bikaner, Rajasthan, India

Barsingar power station
- Country: India
- Location: Barsingsar, Bikaner district, Rajasthan.
- Coordinates: 27.850308°N 73.20116°E
- Status: Operational
- Commission date: Unit 1: December, 2011; Unit 2: January, 2012
- Owner: Neyveli Lignite Corporation

Thermal power station
- Primary fuel: Lignite

Power generation
- Units operational: 2 X 125 MW
- Nameplate capacity: 250 MW

Barsingar power station project is a 250-megawatt (MW) lignite based power station operated by NLC India Limited, formerly Neyveli Lignite Corporation (NLC), located at Barsingsar in Bikaner district, Rajasthan, India.

== Background ==
The first 125 MW was commissioned on 28 June 2010. The second 125 MW was commissioned on 25 January 2011.

Lignite for the power project is being supplied from the Barsingsar Mine, which is owned and operated by NLC. The mine was commissioned in October 2009.

== Delays ==
The company was subject to a financial crunch as a result of delays in commissioning the plant. The first unit was commissioned in 2010, but it was reported that as of October 2011 the unit had not reached its target output. In its July 2010 annual report, NLC stated that the second unit was scheduled to be commissioned in September 2010, but the second 125 MW was commissioned on 25 January 2011, and a media report in late 2011 stated that "the modification works for the second unit are progressing very slowly." The media report also said the station contractor BHEL was "failing to keep its commitment that it will commence commercial operations of the Barsingar thermal power project by end of September 2011." the thermal plant declared for commercial operation during Jan. 2012, while Unit-I was declared during December 2011.

== External resources ==
- "Barsingsar Lignite Power Plant", Global Energy Observatory, accessed January 2012.
