= Unchdih, Chhattisgarh =

Unchdih उंचडीह
- Location in Chhattisgarh
- Coordinates: 22.940°N 84.225°E
- Country: India
- Provinces: Chhattisgarh
- District: Jashpur district

Population (2011)
  - Total: 157

language
  - popular: Hindi, Chhattisgarhi

Unchdih is a small village in Jashpur district of Chhattisgarh state of India.

== See also ==
- Jashpur district
