= Basahi Banzar =

Village in Uttar Pradesh, India

Basahi Banzar is a village in the Lakhimpur Kheri district in Uttar Pradesh, India, near the border with Nepal. The nearest railway station is in Palia Kalan. The local economy is based around farming.
