= Obra Thermal Power Station =

Power station in Uttar Pradesh, India

Coordinates: 24.4454°N 82.9801°E

Obra Thermal Power Station, Obra is located in Sonbhadra district in the Indian state of Uttar Pradesh, about 13 km (8.1 mi) from Chopan Railway Station and about 125 km (78 mi) from Varanasi. The power plant holds the distinction of being the first 200 MW unit of India. It is owned and operated by Uttar Pradesh Rajya Vidyut Utpadan Nigam Limited

== Operations ==
There are thirteen functioning units, all of which are coal-fired thermal power stations. The machinery for most of the units are from Bharat Heavy Electricals Limited. The last unit of 200 MW was commissioned in 1982.

== Capacity ==
Obra Thermal Power Station has a generating capacity of 1288 MW and an auxiliary bus charged from 3*33 mW hydro power plant. Constructions have been underway to add two units of 660 MW each to the power plant.

Stage	Installed Capacity (MW)	Date of Commissioning	Status
1	50	1967 August	Deleted since 2017
2	50	1968 March	Deleted
3	50	1968 October	Deleted
4	50	1969 July	Deleted
5	50	1971 July	Deleted
6	100	1973 October	Deleted
7	100	1974 December	Deleted
8	100	1976 January	Deleted
9	200	1980 March	Running
10	200	1979 March	Running
11	200	1978 March	Running
12	200	1981 May	Running
13	200	1982 July	Running
14	660		under construction
15	660		under construction
16	800	2023	Proposed
17	800	2023	Proposed
