= Uttar Pradesh Rajya Vidyut Utpadan Nigam =

Electricity generation company in Uattar Pradesh

- Native name: उत्तर प्रदेश राज्य विद्युत उत्पादन निगम लिमिटेड
- Company type: Public
- Industry: Electric power
- Founded: 25 August 1980; 45 years ago
- Headquarters: Lucknow, Uttar Pradesh, India
- Owner: Government of Uttar Pradesh
- Website: uprvunl.org

Uttar Pradesh Rajya Vidyut Utpadan Nigam Limited (UPRVUNL) is a wholly owned state thermal power utility with present generating capacity of 8114 MW, operating 6 thermal power stations within Uttar Pradesh.

UPRVUNL was constituted on dated 25 August 1980 under the Companies' Act 1956 for construction of new thermal power projects in the state sector. On 14 January 2000, in accordance to U.P. State Electricity Reforms Acts 1999 and operation of U.P. Electricity Reforms Transfer Scheme 2000, U.P. State Electricity Board (U.P.S.E.B.), till then responsible for generation, transmission and distribution of power within the state of Uttar Pradesh, was unbundled and operations of the state sector thermal power stations were handed over to UPRVUNL. Unchahar Thermal Power Station - 420 MW (2×210) & Tanda Thermal Power Station 440 MW (4×110) were transferred to NTPC in 1992 and 2000 respectively before unbundling of U.P. State Electricity Board (UPSEB) into

1. Uttar Pradesh Rajya Vidyut Utpadan Nigam Limited (UPRVUNL)
2. Uttar Pradesh Power Corporation Limited (UPPCL)
3. UP Power Transmission Corporation Limited (UPPTCL)
4. UP Jal Vidyut Nigam Limited (UPJVNL)

== Power plants ==
=== Present Installations- (9380MW) ===
At present, as of 2026 UPRVUNL is looking after generations of power of six thermal power plants located in different parts of Uttar Pradesh, with a total installed generation capacity of 6134 MW.

- Anpara Thermal Power Station 2630 MW
- Obra Thermal Power Station 2320 MW
- Parichha Thermal Power Station 1140 MW
- Harduaganj Thermal Power Station 1270 MW
- Panki 1×660 MW in Kanpur
- Jawaharpur 2×660 MW total 1320 MW in Etah.

After the merger with Up Jalvidyut Nigam in 2024 the total installed capacity raised by additional 560 MW.

=== Future Expansions ===
==== Construction Stage- (8865 MW) ====
- Meja Thermal Power Station (In 50:50 equity JV with NTPC Limited) - 2X660 (1320 MW)
- Jawaharpur Super Thermal Power Station, Etah district—2×660 MW by Doosan Power Systems India (DPSI).
- Ghatampur Thermal Power Station 3x660 (1980 MW) - (In 49:51 equity JV with Neyveli Lignite Corporation Ltd.)
- Obra C Thermal Power Plant 2×660 (1320 MW)
- Panki Thermal Power Station 660 MW

==== Proposed - (1320 MW) ====
- Karchana Thermal Power Station - 2×660 (1320 MW)

=== Past Transitions (1990 MW) ===
Erstwhile Uttar Pradesh State Electricity Board (UPSEB) transferred its thermal power stations among others to NTPC Limited against payment overdue. These power stations are;

- 1,550 MW Feroze Gandhi Unchahar Thermal Power Plant (Raebareli)
- 440 MW Tanda Thermal Power Station (Ambedkarnagar)

== Human resources ==
As on 01.03.2022 UPRVUNL has 1533 executives and 4659 non-executives on its roll.
