= Antahiya =

Village in Uttar Pradesh, India

Antahiya is a village in Prayagraj, Uttar Pradesh, India.
