= Meja tehsil =

Tehsil in Prayagraj district, Uttar Pradesh, India

Meja Tehsil is a tehsil in Prayagraj district, Uttar Pradesh, India. As of the 2001 census, its total population was 471,851.

Meja is primarily agricultural; the main crops are wheat and rice. Some areas are cultivated with pulses also like Arhar, Urad and Chana. The principal sources of irrigation are canals and tubewells.

Meja is 8 km from Meja Road railway station and connects with Koraon from the south and Manda from the east. It has a cyber cafe, post office, hospitals, phone booths, banks, and ATMs. It also has police station nearby.

The wildlife conservation reserve will come up on over 126 hectares in Meja forest division known for its rocky, undulating and arid terrain. A herd of around 350 blackbucks is estimated to be inhabiting the region.

It will help in conservation of blackbuck in effective way. It will also create awareness about biodiversity conservation and provide opportunities for people's participation. It will also encourage eco-tourism and locals will get opportunities for employment.

Meja, under King Manda, played a major role in India's independence.
