= Anpara Thermal Power Station =

Power station in Sonbhadra, Uttar Pradesh, India

Coordinates: 24.2035°N 82.788°E

Anpara Thermal Power Station is located at Anpara in Sonbhadra district in the Indian state of Uttar Pradesh, about 180 km (110 mi) from Varanasi on the Varanasi–Shakti Nagar route. It has a total power-generation capacity of 3850 MW using 9 units.

== Operations ==
There are in total nine operational units, all of which are coal-fired thermal power stations. The machinery for the UPRVUNL's Anpara A (3 units of 210 MW each) are from Bharat Heavy Electricals Limited. UPRVUNL'S Anpara B (two units of 500 MW each) from Toshiba Corporation, Japan. Machinery for Anpara C was sourced by Lanco power from Dongfang Electric Company (China). Machinery for UPRVUNL'S Anpara D (2 units of 500 MW Each) is sourced from BHEL.

The coal to all these units is fed from Kharia, Kakri, and Beena open coal mines of NCL by company-owned freight trains, a merry-go-round system maintained by UPRVUNL and previously on roads by dumpers.

== Capacity ==
Stage	Unit Number	Installed Capacity (MW)	Date of Commissioning	Status	Remarks
Anpara A	1	210	2015 January	Running	owned by UPRVUNL
Anpara A	2	210	1987 August	Running	owned by UPRVUNL
Anpara A	3	210	1989 March	Running	owned by UPRVUNL
Anpara B	4	500	1994 March	Running	owned by UPRVUNL
Anpara B	5	500	1994 October	Running	owned by UPRVUNL
Anpara C	6	600	2011 December	Running	owned by Lanco Infratech
Anpara C	7	600	2012 January	Running	owned by Lanco Infratech
Anpara D	8	500	2015 June	Running	owned by UPRVUNL
Anpara D	9	500	2016 March	Out of order because of recent accident	owned by UPRVUNL

In 2007, Anpara C was allotted to be constructed in PPP sector domain. The new 2 × 600 MW power plant made under PPP By Lanco Infratech. On 13 November 2019, there was a blast in Anpara D due to accidental leakage of hydrogen gas from the generator of a 500 MW unit, putting two 500 MW units out of operation. The blast was so intense and severe that the generator of one of the units simply turned into pieces, and four assistant engineers who were in control room suffered splinter and burn injuries.
