= Meja Road =

Meja Road is an eastern part of the Prayagraj district and very well connected with the city by road and Indian railways. Meja Road has its railway station 1 km away from downtown in the north which is on the Prayagraj – Pandit Deen Dayal Upadhyaya Nagar section of the Northern Railway in Uttar Pradesh, India, between Unchdih and Bhirpur stations. It connects with Sirsa, Ramnagar, Unchdeeh(North), Prayagraj City (West), Meja (South) and Mirzapur (East) by road. It is 35 kilometres (22 mi) far from the Prayagraj city and comes under Meja constituency. Hindi, Urdu, and English are the languages that are spoken in Meja Road. The dialect of Hindi spoken in Meja Road is Awadhi and all major religions are practiced here. Hindus comprise 86.81% and Muslims 12.72%. There are small groups of Christians, Sikhs, and Buddhists with 0.18%, 0.13%, and 0.04% of the population, respectively. Education in Meja Road – B.N.T. Inter College and some more colleges are providing a good educational platform.

Ram Nagar (Shakti Peeth) is in North-side of Meja Road. It is 5 km from MejaRoad. Ram Nagar is famous for Mata Sheetala Mandir. Many Hindu temples and pilgrimage are near to Meja Road.

Mejaroad has Sidh Hanuman Ji Temple on Panti station road, Pravachan organized every year in the month of Karthik(October) by Temple Prashasan. Late Pt Ram Kripal upadhyay freedom Fighter and Block pramukh Meja.

== Climate ==
Meja Road features the typical version of a humid subtropical climate that is common across the north-central part of India. It experiences three seasons: hot dry summer, cool dry winter, and warm humid monsoon. The summer season lasts from April to June with the maximum temperatures ranging from 40 °C (104 °F) to 45 °C (113 °F). Monsoon begins in early July and lasts till September. The winter season lasts from December to February. Temperatures rarely drop to the freezing point. Maximum temperatures are around 22 °C (72 °F) and minimum around 10 °C (50 °F). It also witnesses severe fog in January resulting in massive traffic and travel delays. It does not snow in Meja Road. Lowest temperature recorded, −2 °C (28 °F); highest 48 °C (118 °F).
