= Bara Thermal Power Station =

Coal power station in Uttar Pradesh, India

Prayagraj Power Generation Company Limited ( Bara Thermal Power Station )
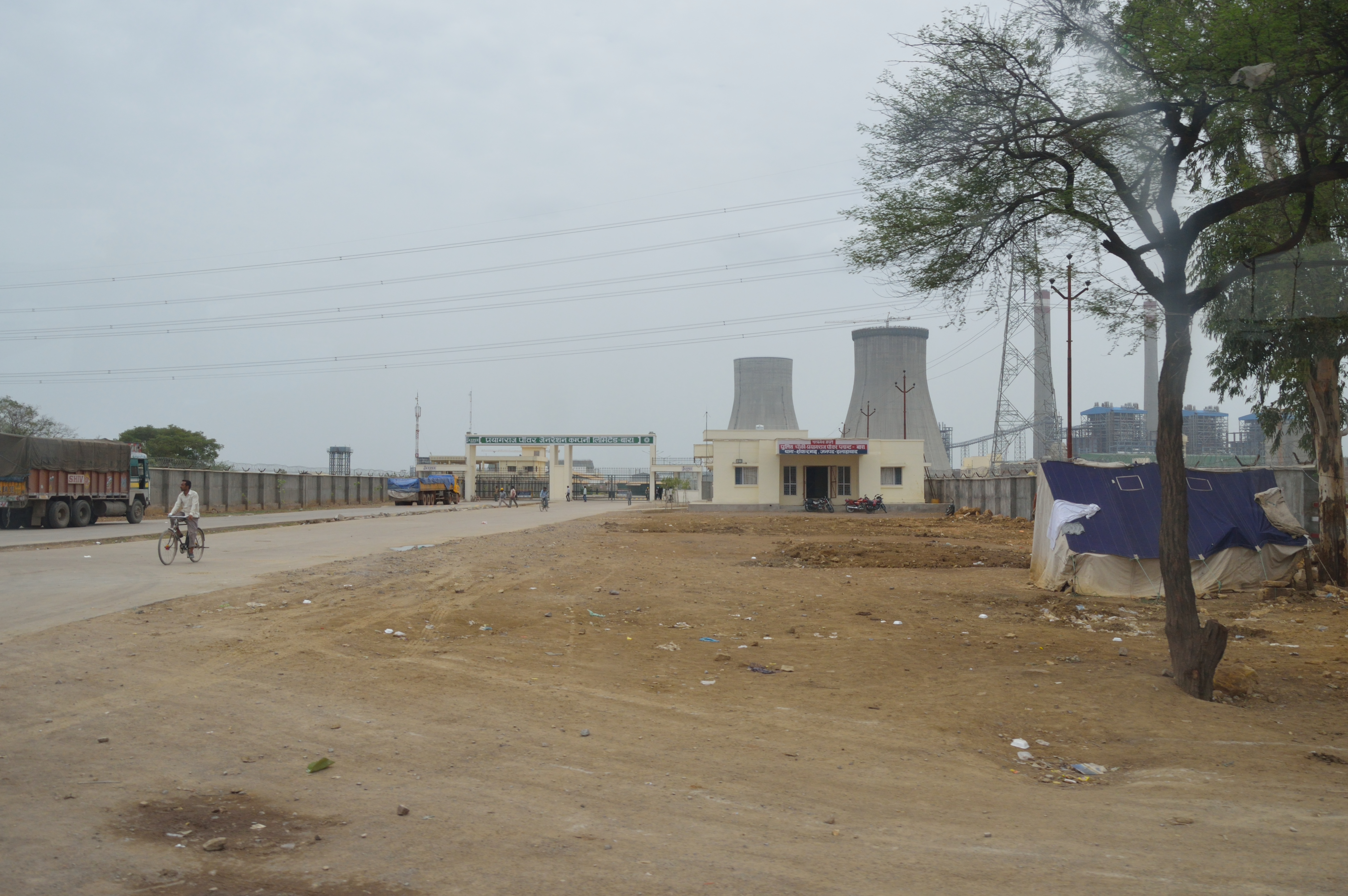
- Bara Thermal Power Station under construction in 2014.
- Country: India
- Location: Prayagraj, Uttar Pradesh
- Coordinates: 25°11′51″N 81°39′28″E
- Status: Operational
- Commission date: 2015
- Operator: TATA POWER

Thermal power station
- Primary fuel: Coal

Power generation
- Units operational: 3
- Nameplate capacity: 1980 MW

External links
- Website: ppgcl.co.in
- Commons: Related media on Commons

Prayagraj Power Generation Company Limited is a coal-based, 3×660 MW, super critical thermal power plant located in Bara Tehsil in Prayagraj district, Uttar Pradesh. The power plant is owned by Renascent Power, a subsidiary of the Tata Power. The total cost of the project was INR 12,000 crores. In November 2019 Resurgent Power Ventures Pte. Limited (Resurgent Power) has announced closing the deal for acquiring 75 per cent stake in Jaiprakash Associates Ltd's Prayagraj Power.

== Capacity ==
The planned capacity of the power plant is 3 × 660 MW.

Stage	Unit Number	Capacity (MW)	Date of COD
1st	1	660	28 February 2016
1st	2	660	10 September 2016
1st	3	660	26 May 2017

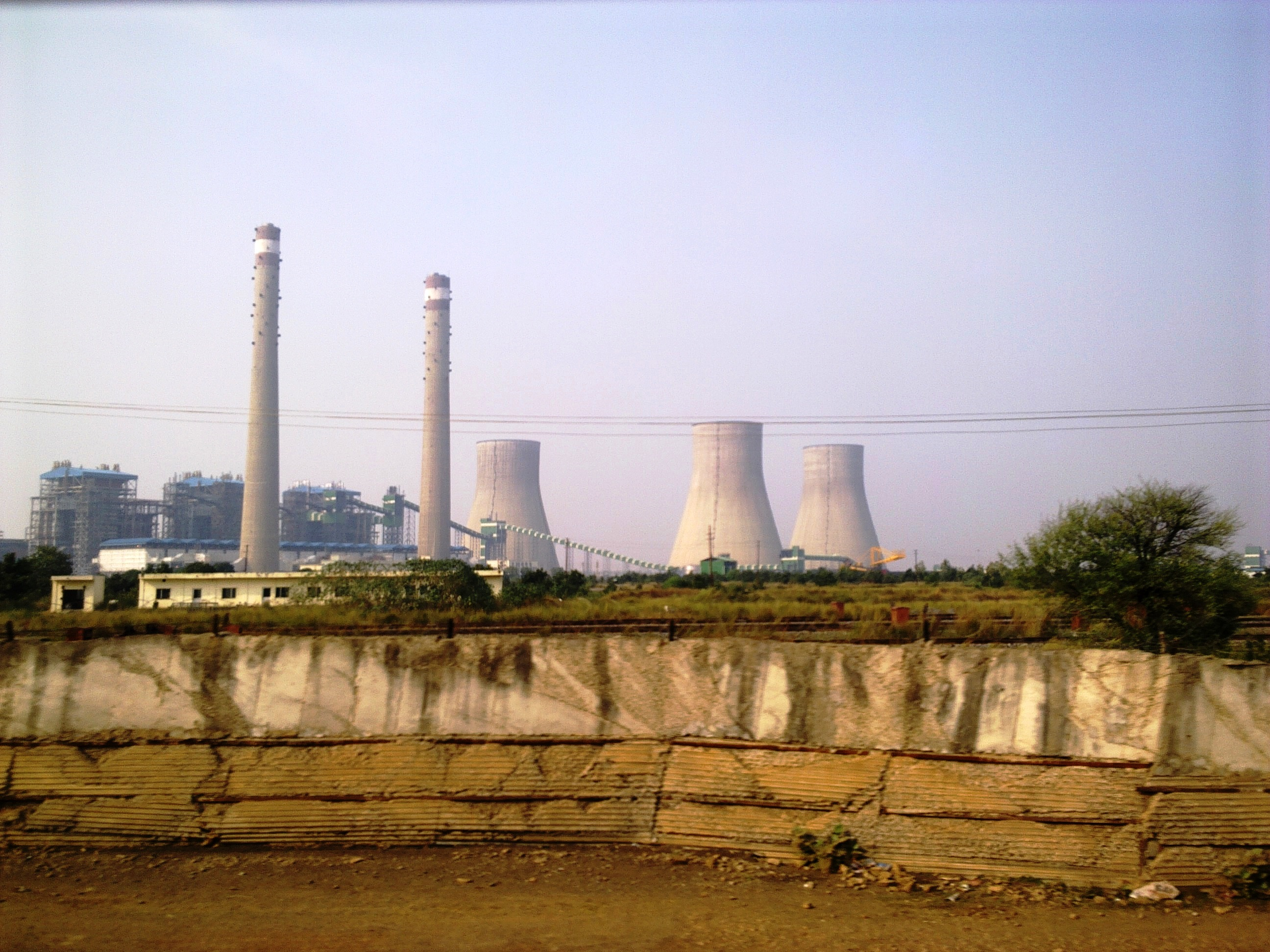
Bara Thermal Power Project, 2015
