= Koraon =

Koraon Koraw
- Town and Nagar Panchayat
- Location in Prayagraj, Uttar Pradesh, India Koraon (India)
- Coordinates: 25.008462°N 82.067871°E
- Country: India
- State: Uttar Pradesh
- District: Prayagraj
- Tehsil: Koraon

Government
  - Type: Nagar Panchayat
  - Body: Koraon Nagar Panchayat

Population (2011)
  - Total: 14,821

Language
  - Official: Hindi
  - Additional official: Urdu & Awadhi
- Time zone: UTC+5:30 (IST)
- PIN: 212306
- Vehicle registration: UP70

Koraon (also spelled Koraw) is a town and a nagar panchayat in Prayagraj district in the Indian state of Uttar Pradesh. It is the headquarter of the Koraon tehsil and community development block in Prayagraj district. The town is located roughly 60–65 km south of Prayagraj city at coordinates 25.008462°N 82.067871°E and has the PIN code 212306.

== Administration ==
Koraon is administered by the Koraon Nagar Panchayat under the Uttar Pradesh state government. It serves as the headquarters of:

- Koraon Tehsil – one of the tehsils of Prayagraj district, covering an area of 830.12 km².
- Koraon Block – one of the 23 community development blocks under Koraon tehsil, overseen by a Block Development Officer based in the town.

=== Police ===
The Koraon Police Station (थाना कोराँव) handles local law and order and operates under the Meja police circle. It is located at Thane Wali Gali, Koraon, Prayagraj, Uttar Pradesh – 212306.

== Geography ==
Koraon tehsil borders several other tehsils of Prayagraj district, lying in its southern part. As per Census 2011, the Koraon tehsil has a total of over 264 villages and 1 town (Koraon Nagar Panchayat). Notable nearby villages include Barokhar (population 11,815), Kheri (7,031), Mahuli (7,103), Leriyari (6,427), and Bhagesar (6,359).

== Demographics ==
=== Koraon Town (2011 Census) ===
As per the 2011 India Census, Koraon Nagar Panchayat had a population of 14,821, of which 7,657 (51.7%) were male and 7,164 (48.3%) were female. The sex ratio was 936 females per 1,000 males, which is slightly below the national average of 943.

The literacy rate of Koraon town was 75.29%, significantly higher than the state average and the tehsil rural average. Male literacy stood at 84.71% while female literacy was 65.25%. About 15.6% of the population (2,314 children) were under 6 years of age. Scheduled Castes constituted about 13.1% of the town's population, with virtually no Scheduled Tribe residents.

By religion, Hindus formed the majority, making up approximately 77.1% of the town's population, followed by Muslims at about 22.3%.

=== Koraon Tehsil (2011 Census) ===
Parameter	Total	Rural	Urban
Population	3,78,839	3,64,018	14,821
Children (0–6 years)	68,093	65,779	2,314
Literacy Rate	64.93%	64.49%	75.29%
Sex Ratio (females per 1,000 males)	909	908	936
Scheduled Caste (%)	30.6%	31.4%	13.1%
Scheduled Tribe (%)	0.3%	0.3%	0%

== Education ==
Koraon and its surrounding tehsil have a mix of government and private educational institutions ranging from primary schools to degree colleges and polytechnics.

=== Schools ===
- Rajkiya Ashram Paddhati Inter College – A state-run tribal-welfare high school established in 1988, located in Korawan village.
- Government Schools – Several government primary and secondary schools are run by the Uttar Pradesh Basic Education Board in Koraon block villages.
- Government Inter Colleges – A new Government Inter College building was completed at Devghat in 2022 to provide education up to Class 12.
- K.R.R.P. Intermediate College – Located in the Koraon tehsil area, offering secondary and senior secondary education.

=== Colleges & Polytechnics ===
- Shrinath Ramnath Mahavidyalaya & Bhagauti Prasad Singh Mahavidhyalaya – Degree colleges offering undergraduate courses.
- Government Polytechnic Bara, Prayagraj – Established in 2024 in Bara village, offering engineering diploma courses.

== Healthcare ==
Healthcare facilities in Koraon are anchored by the Community Health Centre (CHC), which provides basic government medical, outpatient, and emergency services to the town and neighboring rural areas. Additionally, the town is served by several private clinics, polyclinics (such as Aastha Polyclinic on the Koraon–Meja Road), and smaller diagnostic centers to handle the medical needs of the local population.

== Notable Villages in Koraon Tehsil ==
The Koraon tehsil contains over 264 villages as per Census 2011. Some of the most populous villages include:

Village	Population (2011)
Mahuli	7,103
Kheri	7,031
Bhagesar	6,359
Leriyari	6,427
Tarav	5,400
Paitiha	4,989
Majhigawan	4,879
Devghat	4,537
Semari Baghrai	4,268
Nibi	4,184

== Transport ==
Koraon is connected by road to Prayagraj (Allahabad) city. The vehicle registration plates in Koraon fall under the UP-70 series, which covers Prayagraj district.
