= Prayagraj district =

District of Uttar Pradesh in India

Coordinates: 25°27′N 81°51′E

Prayagraj district Allahabad district
- District of Uttar Pradesh
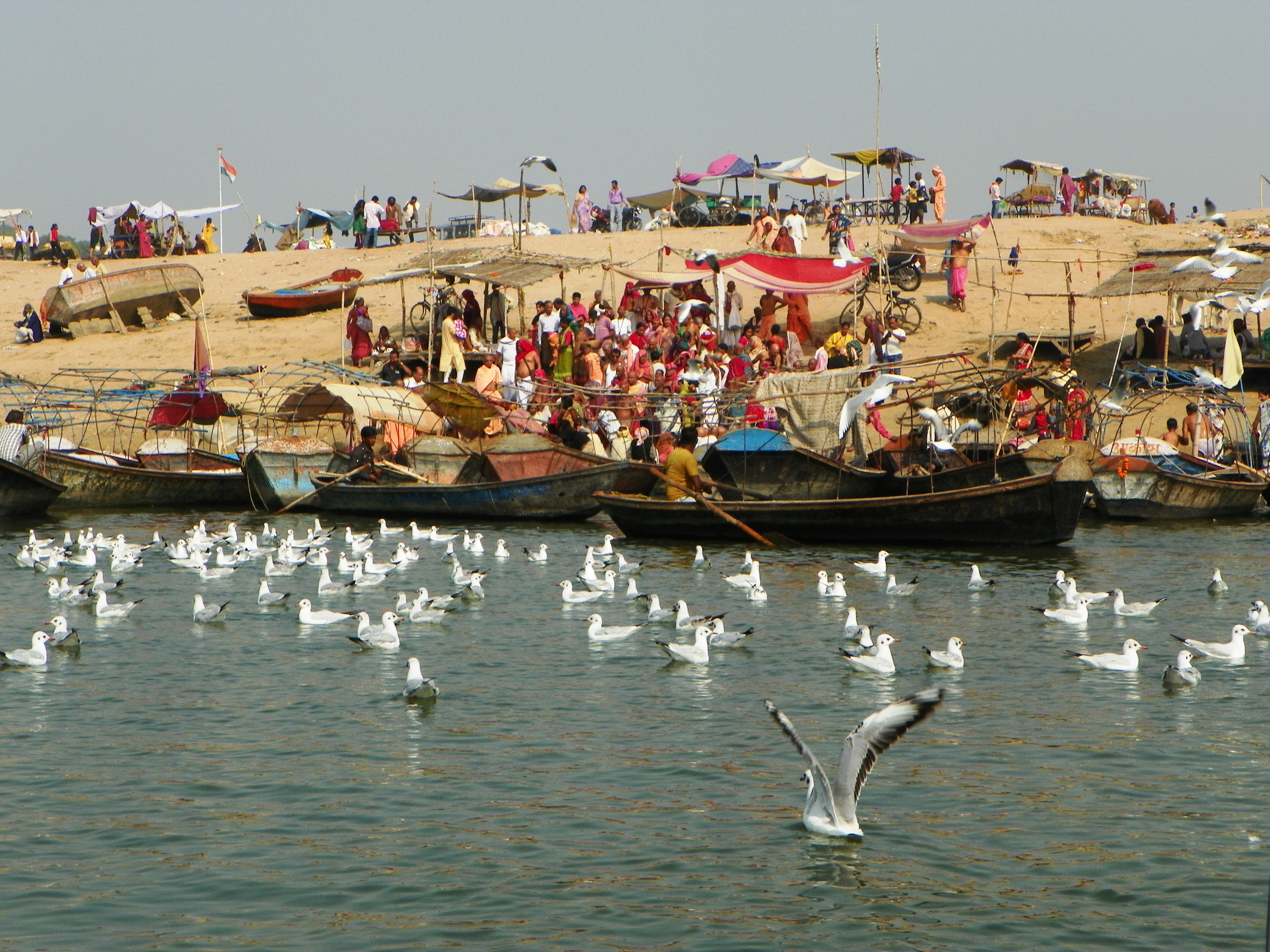
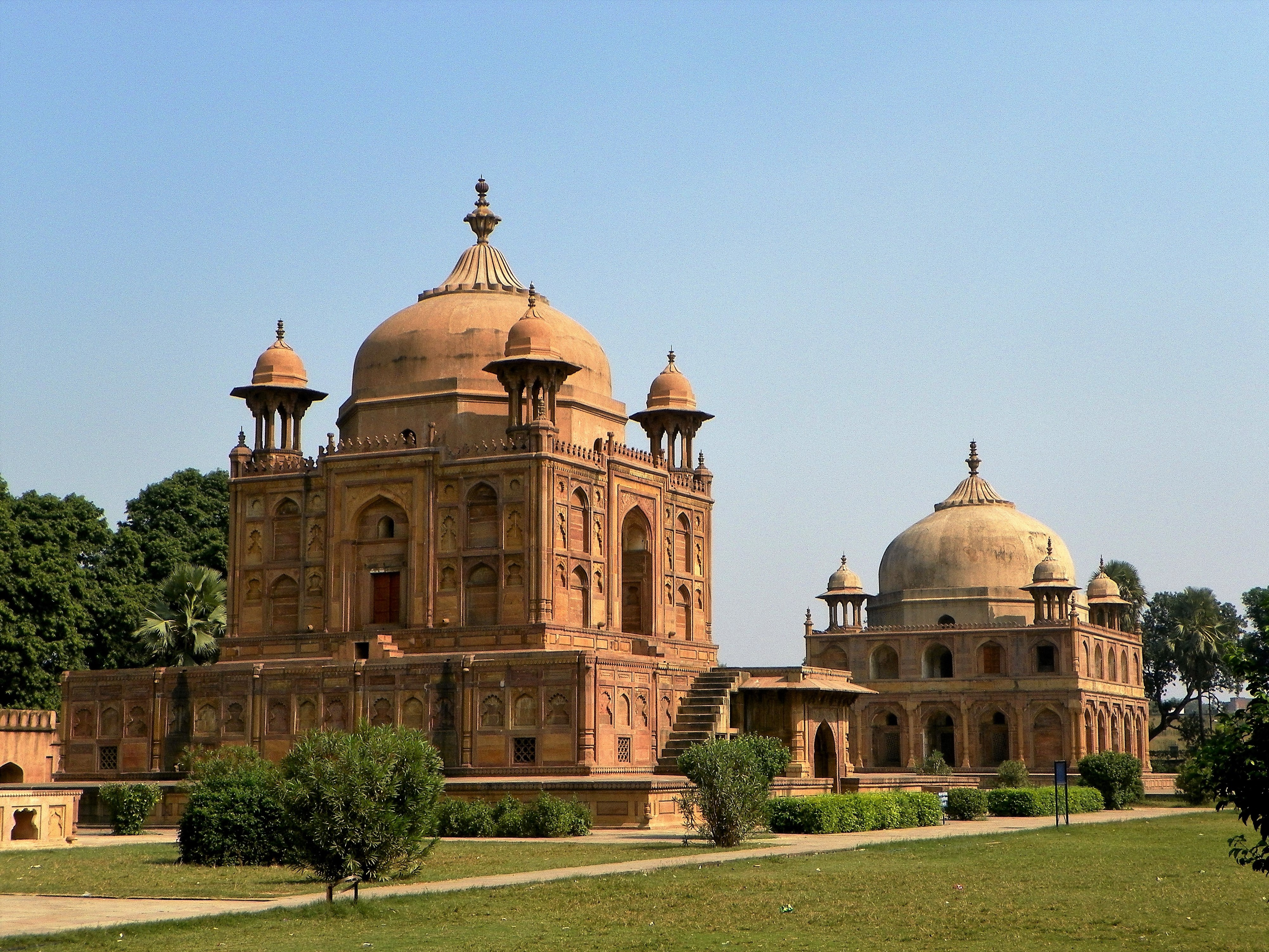
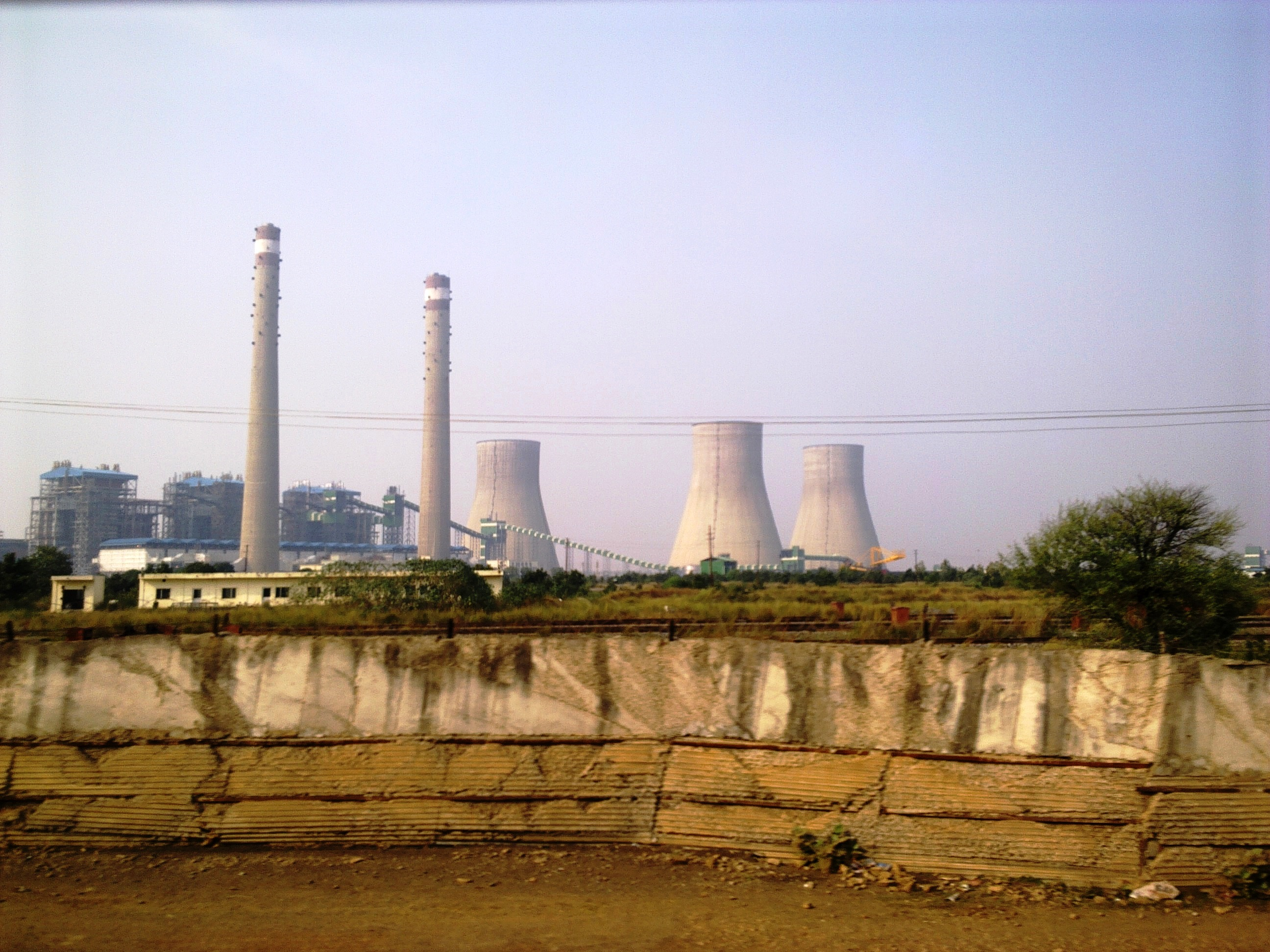
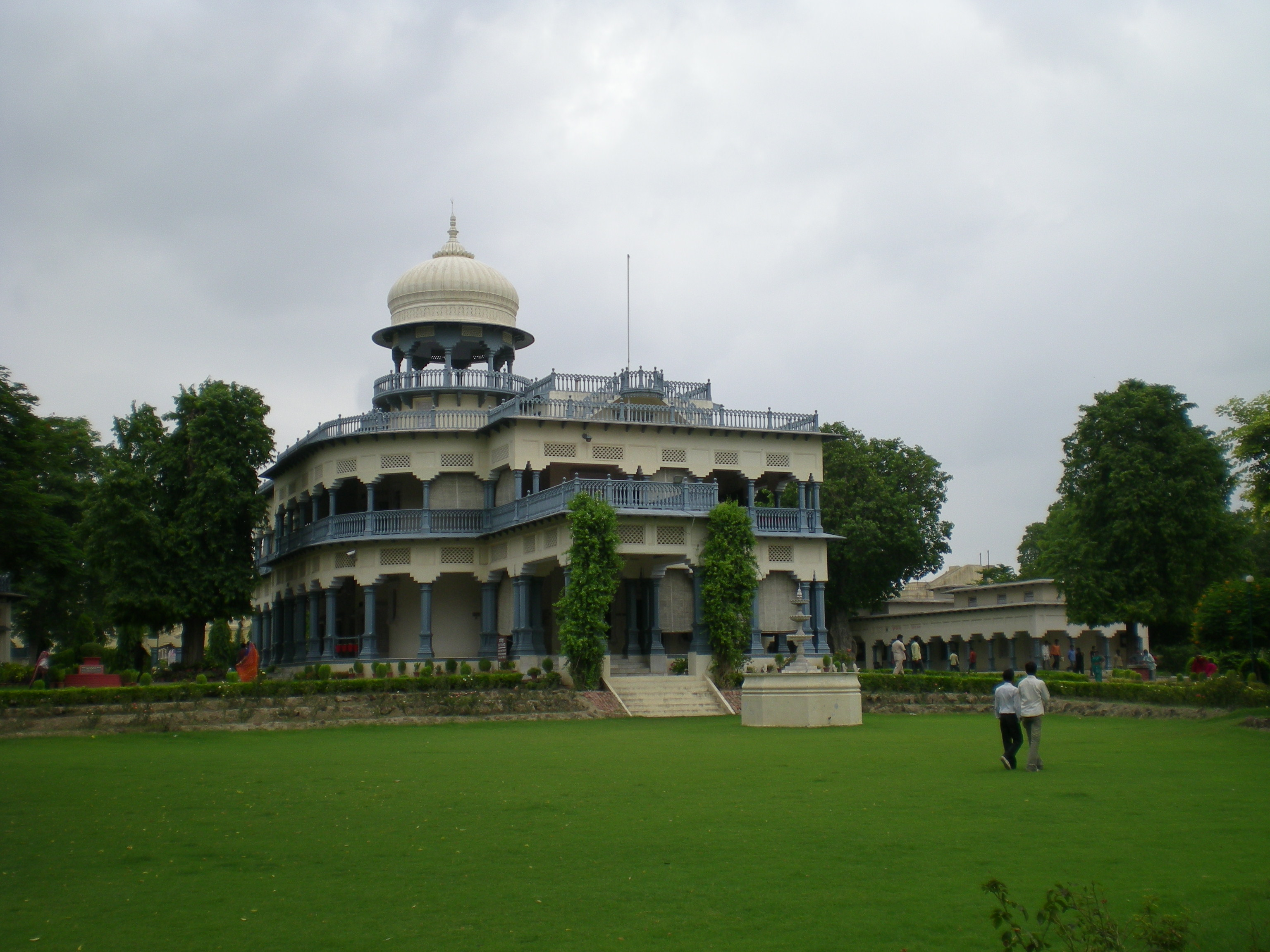
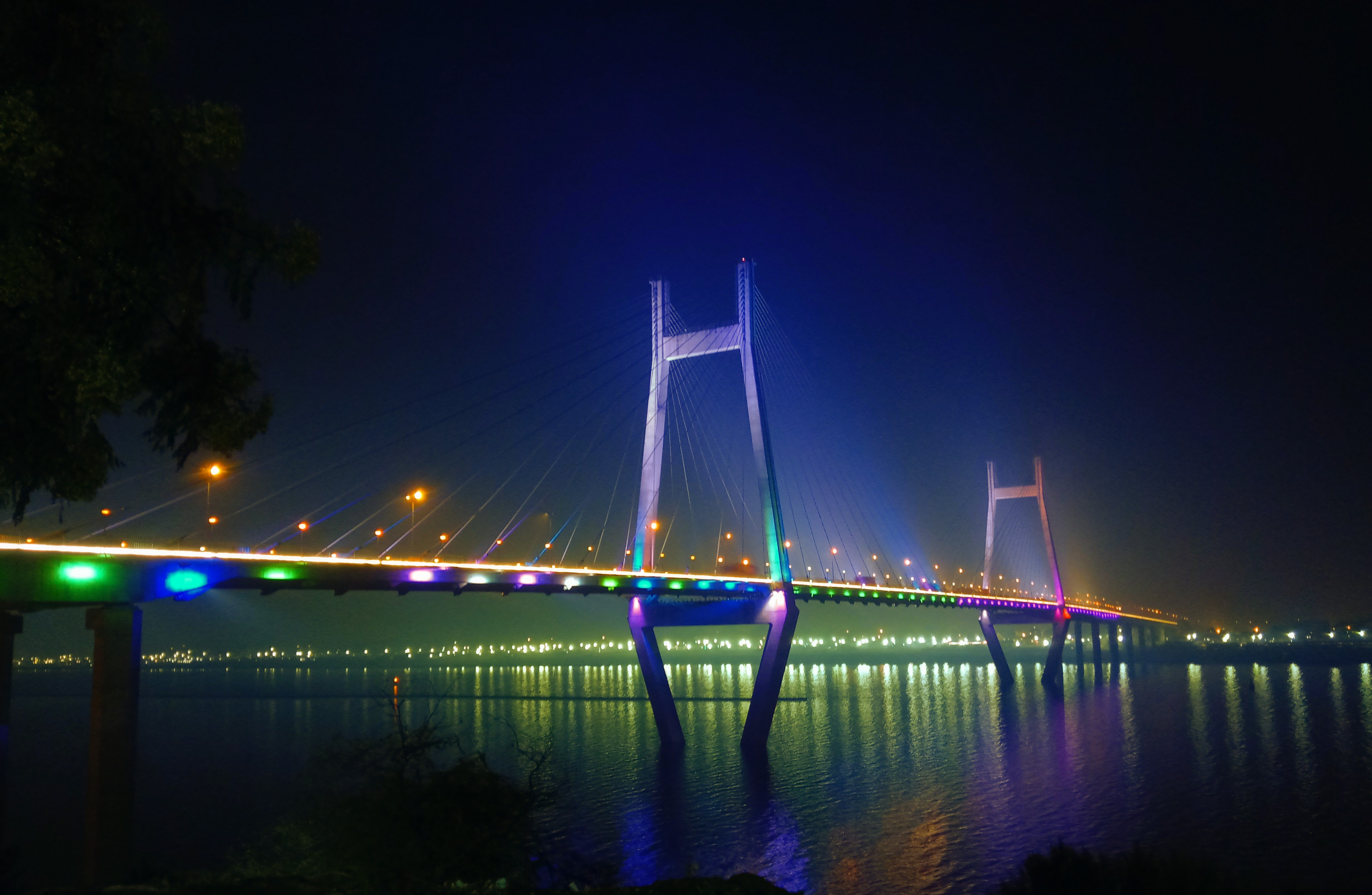
- Clockwise from top-left: Triveni Sangam, Tomb of Nihar Begum at Khusro Bagh, Anand Bhavan, New Yamuna Bridge, Bara Thermal Power Station

- Location of Prayagraj district in Uttar Pradesh
- Country: India
- State: Uttar Pradesh
- Division: Prayagraj
- Headquarters: Prayagraj
- Tehsils: 8

Government
  - Divisional Commissioner: Sanjay Goyal IAS
  - District Magistrate: Sanjay Khatri IAS
  - Police Commissioner: Piyush Mordia IPS

Area
  - Total: 5,482 km^{2} (2,117 sq mi)

Population (2011)
  - Total: 5,954,391
  - Density: 1,100/km^{2} (2,800/sq mi)

Demographics
  - Literacy: 74.41%
  - Sex ratio: 901
- Time zone: UTC+05:30 (IST)
- Vehicle registration: UP 70
- Major highways: NH 19
- Lok Sabha constituencies: Allahabad; Phulpur
- Website: prayagraj.nic.in

Prayagraj district, formerly and colloquially known as Allahabad district, is the most populous district in the Indian state of Uttar Pradesh. Prayagraj city is the district headquarters of this district. The District is divided into blocks within tehsils. As of 2011, there are 20 blocks in eight tehsils. The Prayagraj division includes the districts of Pratapgarh, Fatehpur, Kaushambi and Prayagraj, with some western parts that had previously been part of Allahabad District becoming part of the new Kaushambi District. The administrative divisions are Phulpur, Koraon, Meja, Sadar, Soraon, Handia, Bara, Shringverpur and Karchana.

The district is bordered by five districts, four of which lie within Uttar Pradesh and one in the neighboring state of Madhya Pradesh. To the north, Prayagraj district shares its boundary with Pratapgarh district. The eastern border is adjacent to Bhadohi district (formerly known as Sant Ravidas Nagar district). Continuing southeast, the district touches Mirzapur district. On the southern side, it borders Rewa district in Madhya Pradesh, forming an inter-state boundary. To the west, Prayagraj is flanked by Kaushambi district and slightly with Chitrakoot district.

The three rivers of India - Ganges, Yamuna and the mythical river of Sarasvati - meet at a point in the district, known as Triveni Sangam, considered holy by Hindus. Prayagraj is one of the largest educational hubs.

== Demographics ==
Historical population
| Year | Pop. | ±% p.a. |
|---|---|---|
| 1901 | 1,141,944 | — |
| 1911 | 1,124,143 | −0.16% |
| 1921 | 1,076,120 | −0.44% |
| 1931 | 1,142,845 | +0.60% |
| 1941 | 1,388,068 | +1.96% |
| 1951 | 1,568,592 | +1.23% |
| 1961 | 1,882,506 | +1.84% |
| 1971 | 2,292,284 | +1.99% |
| 1981 | 2,983,245 | +2.67% |
| 1991 | 3,899,660 | +2.71% |
| 2001 | 4,937,266 | +2.39% |
| 2011 | 5,954,391 | +1.89% |

According to the 2011 Census of India the district has a population of 5,954,391. This gives it a ranking of 13th in India (out of a total of 640). As of 2011 it is the most populous district of Uttar Pradesh (out of 71). The district has a population density of 1,087 inhabitants per square kilometre (2,820/sq mi). Its population growth rate over the decade 2001-2011 was 20.74%.

The district has a sex ratio of 902 females for every 1000 males, and a literacy rate of 74.41%, highest in the region and close to the all-India average of 74%. 24.75% of the population lives in urban areas. Scheduled Castes made up 22.00% of the population.

=== Religion ===
Religions in Prayagraj district (2011)
| Religion | Percent |
| Hinduism | 85.69% |
| Islam | 13.38% |
| Other or not stated | 0.93% |

Hinduism is majority religion in the district with 85.69% followers. Islam is second most popular religion in district of Prayagraj with approximately 13.38% following it. Around 0.93% stated 'Other Religion', approximately 0.51% stated 'No Particular Religion'. Small numbers of Christians live in the district.

The Prayag Kumbh Mela is a major Hindu event. Prayagraj has a Triveni Sangam. Akshayavat is a sacred fig tree. There is a Roman Catholic Diocese of Allahabad.

=== Languages ===
Languages of Prayagraj district (2011)
1. Hindi (94.9%)
2. Urdu (2.69%)
3. Awadhi (1.86%)
4. Others (0.54%)

At the time of the 2011 Census of India, 94.91% of the population in the district spoke Hindi (or a variant of Hindi), 2.69% Urdu and 1.86% Awadhi as their first language.

People in the district speak Awadhi, a language in the Hindi continuum spoken by over 4 million people, mainly in the Awadh region; and Bagheli, which has a lexical similarity of 72-91% with Hindi and is spoken by about 3 million people in Bagelkhand.

== See also ==
- Loni River
