= Chhalesar =

- Village
- Chhalesar shown within the map of Uttar Pradesh Chhalesar (India)
- Coordinates: 27.176049°N 79.42012°E
- Country: India
- State: Uttar Pradesh
- District: Aligarh

Chhalesar is a village in the block and nagar panchayat of Jawan Sikandarpur, Aligarh district in Northern India. It is also known for being the location of the fourth Vedic school ("gurukul") founded in 1870 by the Arya Samaj reform movement. Swami Dayanand also visited here with Thakur Bopal Singh and Thakur Manna Singh.

== See also ==
- Kasimpur Power House
- Talib Nagar
