= Kripa Shankar Sharma =

- Born: Morena, Madhya Pradesh, India
- Died: Morena, Madhya Pradesh, India
- Children: Indira Indu

Kripa Shankar Sharma was a Hindi poet from Morena, Madhya Pradesh.

== Biography ==
Kripa Shanka Sharma was born in Harduaganj, Aligarh, Uttar Pradesh.

He spent 6 months in jail for 1942's non-cooperation movement headed by Mahatma Gandhi. He wrote a letter to Pt. Jawahar Lal Nehru

His grandfather Pt. Nathuram Shankar Sharma'Shankar' and father Hari Shankar Sharma were famous Hindi poets, and his daughter Indira Indu was also a well-known poet. His younger brother Vidhay Shankar Sharma was editor of Sainik (Agra) and Amar Ujala (Agra).

== Print media work ==
He was editor of Nirala.

== Poetic work ==
His poetic works include: Murlika, Jar Ram-Rajya aa jayega, Bapu ke geet, Jadgamba, Kalyugi & Har hindu hindustani hai, and Sondhi Sughand.

== Books ==
- Hindi Sahitya Parichya
- Hindi Sahitya Ka Itihas
- Din Ke Sapney
- Bikhari Kiraney, an essay collection
