= Ganges Canal =

Irrigation canal system in Uttar Pradesh, India

Coordinates: 29°46′N 78°12′E

The Ganges Canal highlighted in red stretching between its headworks off the Ganges river in Hardwar and its confluence with the Jumna river below Cawnpore (now Kanpur).

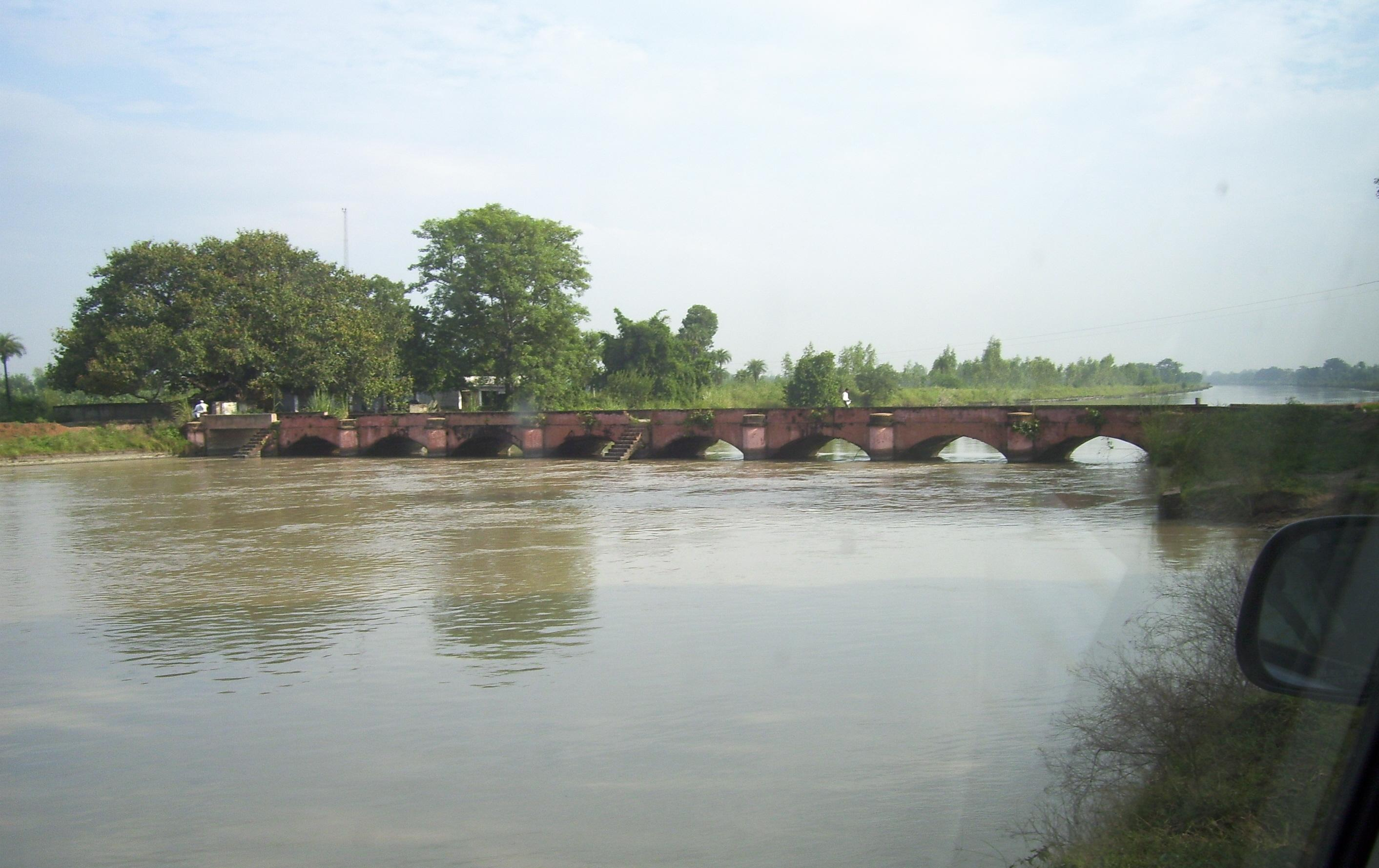
Photograph of an old bridge on the Ganges Canal (constructed before 1854 during East India Company rule in India). The photograph was taken from a moving car.

The Ganges Canal or Ganga Canal is a canal system that irrigates the Doab region between the Ganges River and the Yamuna River in India.

The canal is primarily an irrigation canal, although parts of it were also used for navigation, primarily for its construction materials. Separate navigation channels with lock gates were provided on this system for boats to negotiate falls. Originally constructed from 1842 to 1854, for an original head discharge of 6,000 cubic feet (170 m^{3}) a second, the Upper Ganges Canal has since been enlarged gradually for the present head discharge of 10,500 ft³/s (295 m³/s). The system consists of the main canal of 272 miles and about 4,000 miles long distribution channels. The canal system irrigates nearly 9,000 km² of fertile agricultural land in ten districts of Uttar Pradesh and Uttarakhand. Today the canal is the source of agricultural prosperity in much of these states, and the irrigation departments of these states actively maintain the canal against a fee system charged from users.

There are some small hydroelectric plants on the canal capable of generating about 33 MW if running at full capacity; these are at Nirgajini, Chitaura, Salawa, Bhola, Jani, Jauli and Dasna.

== Structure ==
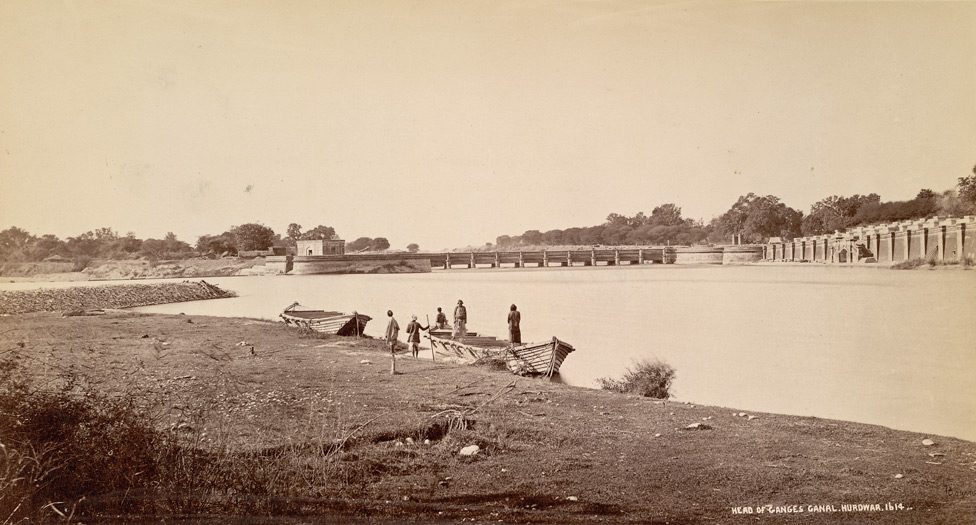
Photograph (1860) of the head works of the Ganges Canal in Haridwar, by Samuel Bourne.

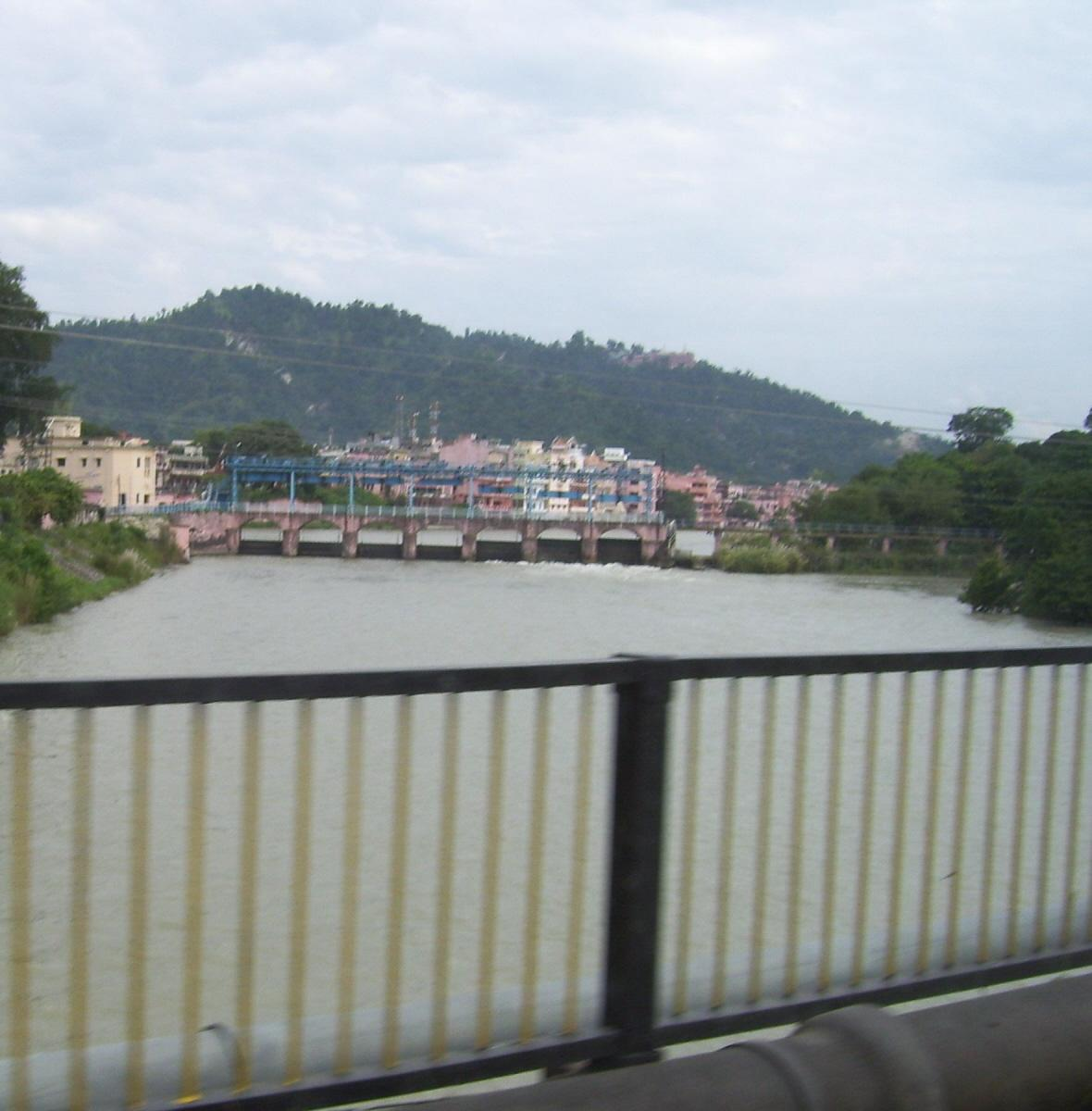
Photograph (2008) of the head works of the Ganges Canal in Haridwar, taken from the opposite side.

The canal is administratively divided into the Upper Ganges Canal from Haridwar to Aligarh, with some branches, and the Lower Ganges Canal which constitutes several branches below Aligarh.

=== Upper Ganges Canal ===
The Upper Ganges canal is the important and the original Ganges Canal, which starts at the Bhimgoda Barrage near Har ki Pauri at Haridwar, traverses Bahadrabad, Roorkee, Manglaur, Purkazi, Khatauli, Sardhana (Meerut district), Modinagar, Muradnagar, Masuri (near Dasna), Bulandshahr, Khurja, Jawan Sikandpur, Harduaganj and continues to Nanau (near Akrabad) in Aligarh district, where it bifurcates into the Kanpur branch and Etawah branch.

=== Lower Ganges Canal ===
A channel from Chaudhary Charan Singh barrage at Narora (Bulandshahr district) intersects the canal system 48 km downstream from Nanau (Aligarh district), and continues past the Sengar River and Sersa River, past Shikohabad in Firozabad District to become the Bhognipur branch which was opened in 1880. This branch, starting at Jera village in Mainpuri district, runs for 166 km to reach Kanpur.

At kilometre 64 the Balrai escape carries excess water through a 6.4 km. channel through the ravines to discharge into the Yamuna. This branch has 386 km. of distributary channels.

The Bhognipur branch, together with the Kanpur and Etawah branches, is known as the Lower Ganges Canal. The old channels of the old Kanpur and Etawah branches between Nanau and the point of intersection by the channel from Narora, are known as "stumps", and are utilized only when the supply of water in the lower Ganges system runs low. The main branch of the river passes Kanpur (behind IIT Kanpur campus) before breaking into several branches. A branch of it terminates Kanpur Jal Sansthan which comes from behind J. K. Temple.

== History ==
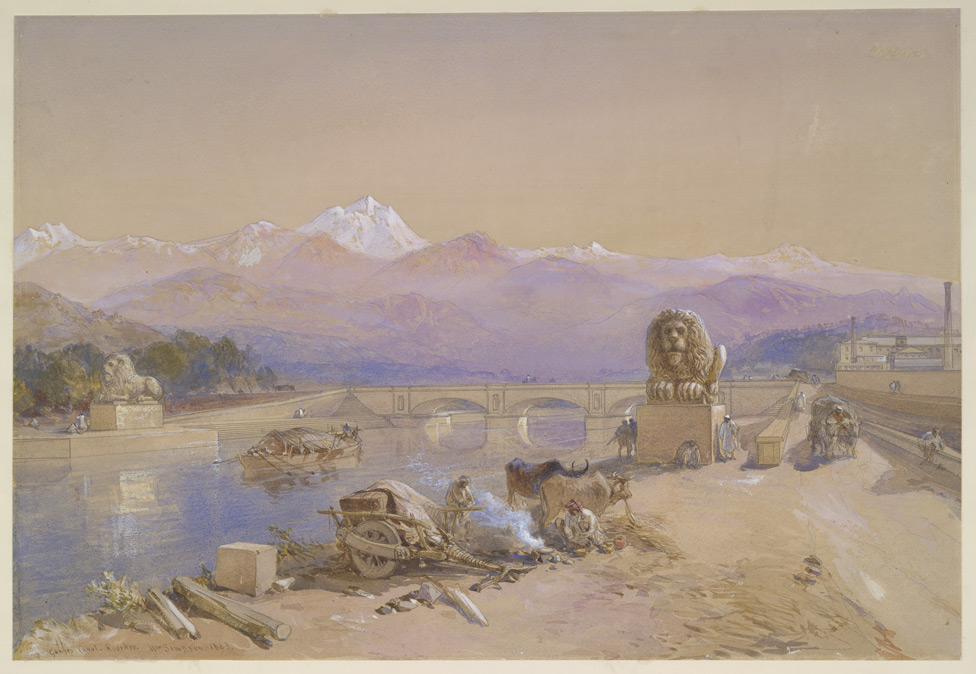
Watercolor (1863) titled, "The Ganges Canal, Roorkee, Saharanpur District (U.P.)." The canal was the brainchild of Sir Proby Cautley; construction began in 1840, and the canal was opened by Governor-General Lord Dalhousie in April 1854.

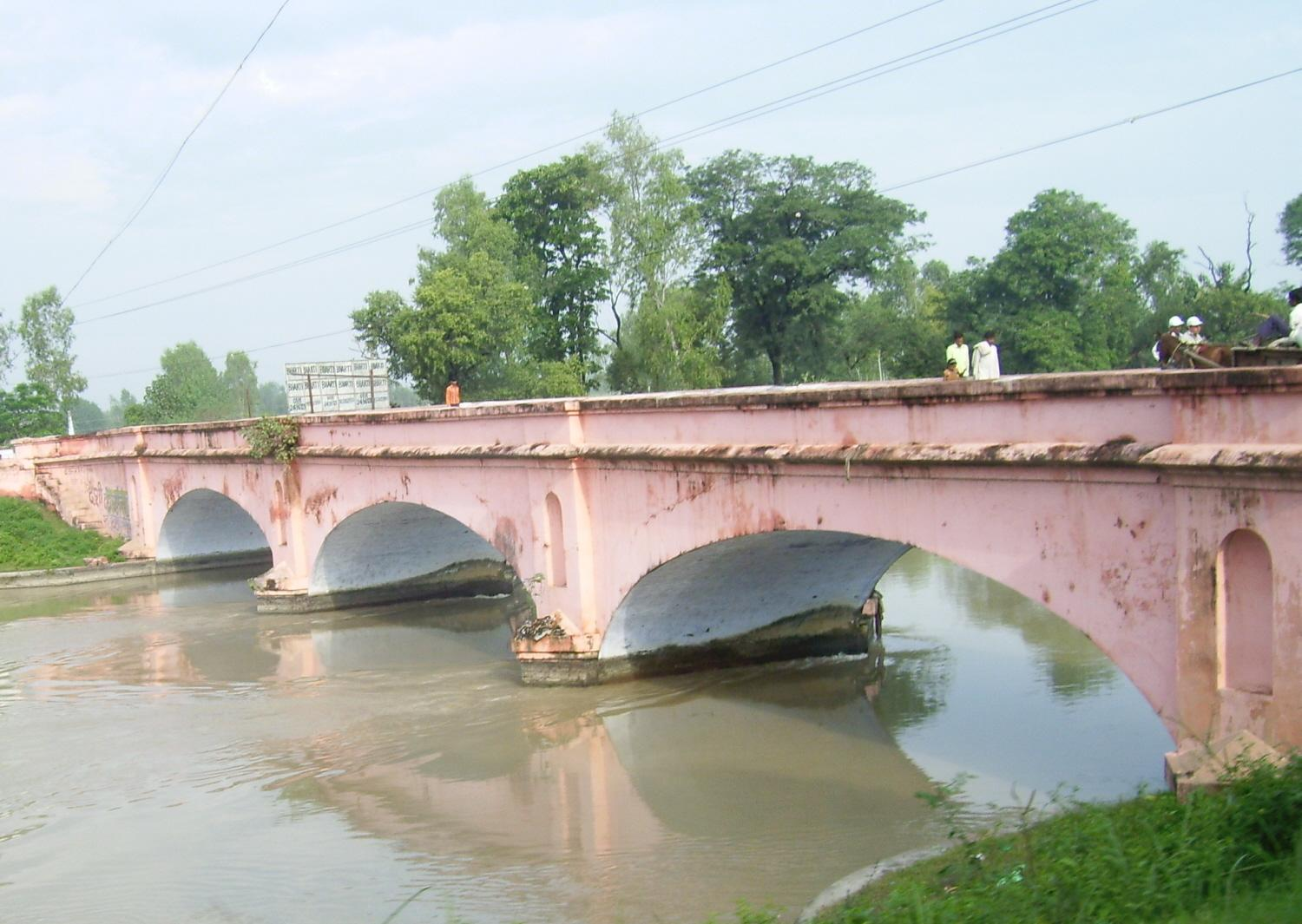
Photograph (2008) of an East India Company-era (1854) bridge on the Ganges Canal near Roorkee

An irrigation system was felt necessary after the disastrous Agra famine of 1837–38, in which nearly 800,000 people died, and nearly ten million rupees was spent on relief works, resulting in considerable loss of revenue to the British East India Company. One of the moving forces behind the canal was Colonel Proby Cautley, who was confident that a 500-kilometre canal was feasible. There were many obstacles and objections to his project, mostly financial, but Cautley persevered and after spending six months walking and riding through the area taking measurements, he managed to persuade the British East India Company to sponsor the project.

Digging of the canal began in April 1842. Cautley had to make his own bricks, brick kiln and mortar. Initially, he was opposed by the Hindu priests at Haridwar, who felt that the waters of the holy river Ganges would be imprisoned but Cautley pacified them by agreeing to leave a gap in the dam from where the water could flow unchecked. He further appeased the priests by undertaking the repair of bathing ghats along the river. He also inaugurated the dam by the worship of Lord Ganesh, the god of good beginnings. The dam was faced with many complications- among them was the problem of the mountainous streams that threatened the canal. Near Roorkee, the land fell away sharply and Cautley had to build an aqueduct to carry the canal for half a kilometre. As a result, at Roorkee the canal is 25 metres higher than the original river. When the canal formally opened on 8 April 1854, its main channel was 348 miles (560 km) long, its branches 306 miles (492 km) long and the various tributaries over 3,000 miles (4,800 km) long. After irrigation was commenced in May 1855, over 767,000 acres (3,100 km^{2}) in 5,000 villages were irrigated.

In 1877 the whole canal system of the lower Doabs underwent radical alteration. The Lower Ganges Canal, with a feed from a channel from Narora, was constructed into the ghar tract of Etawah, and became the Bhognipur branch. Around 1900, according to the Nuttall Encyclopedia of 1907, it had a total extent of 3,700 miles (6,000 km), of which 500 miles (800 km) were navigable. Building of this canal also eventually led to the establishment of first engineering college in India, the College of Civil Engineering at Roorkee (Now Indian Institute of Technology, Roorkee).

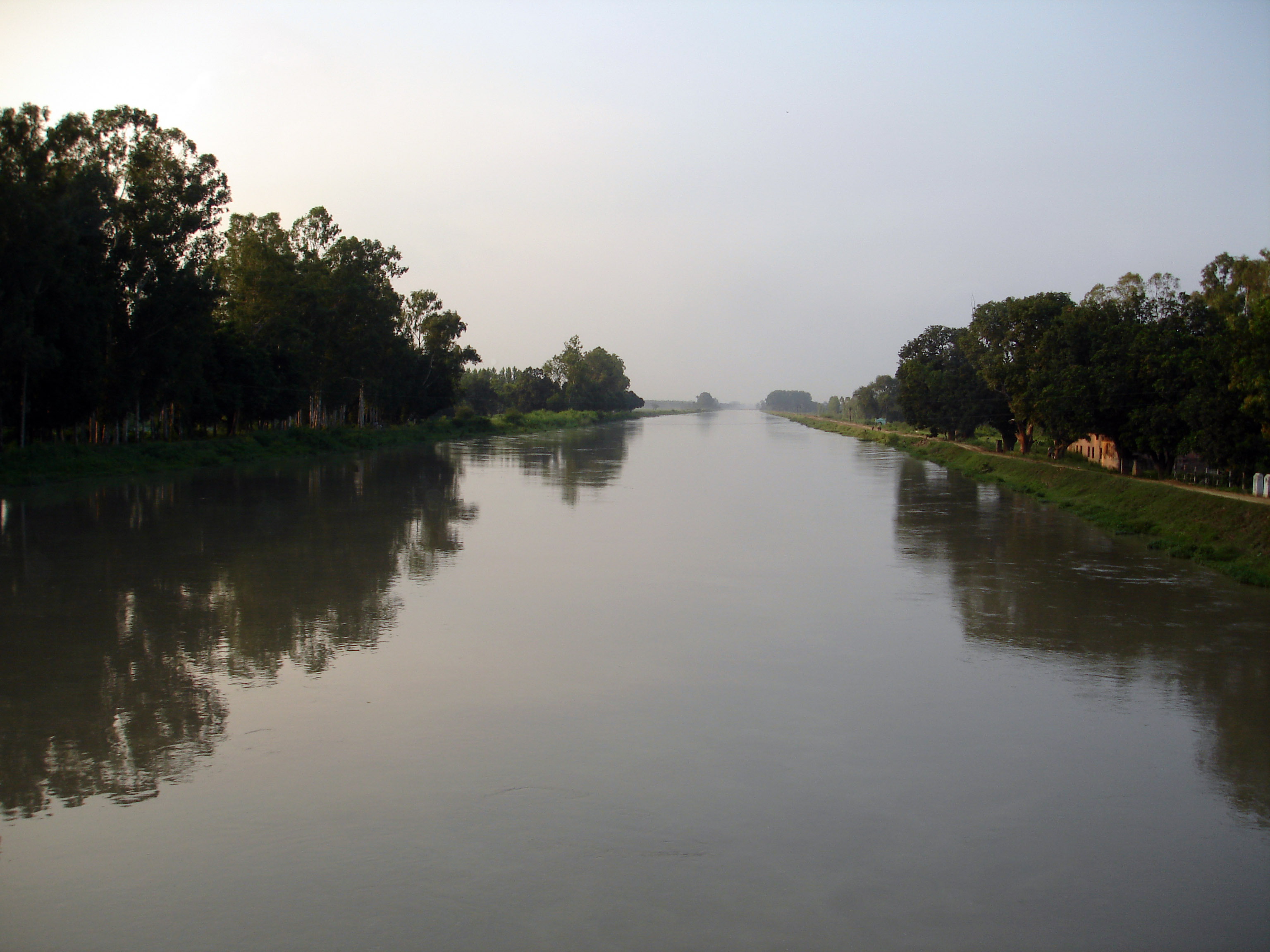
The Ganges Canal.

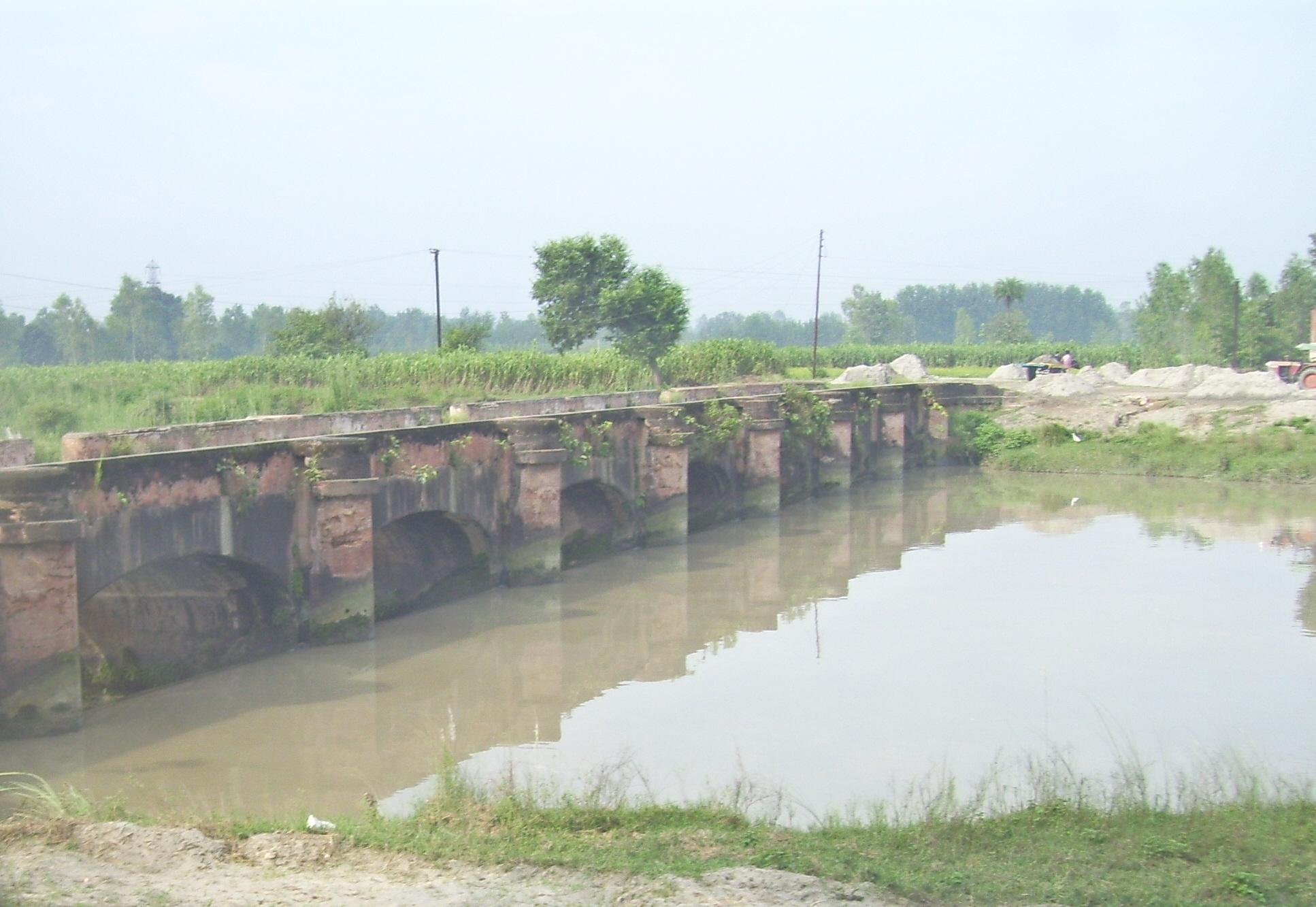
The same East India Company bridge as in the lead paragraph photographed from the other side.

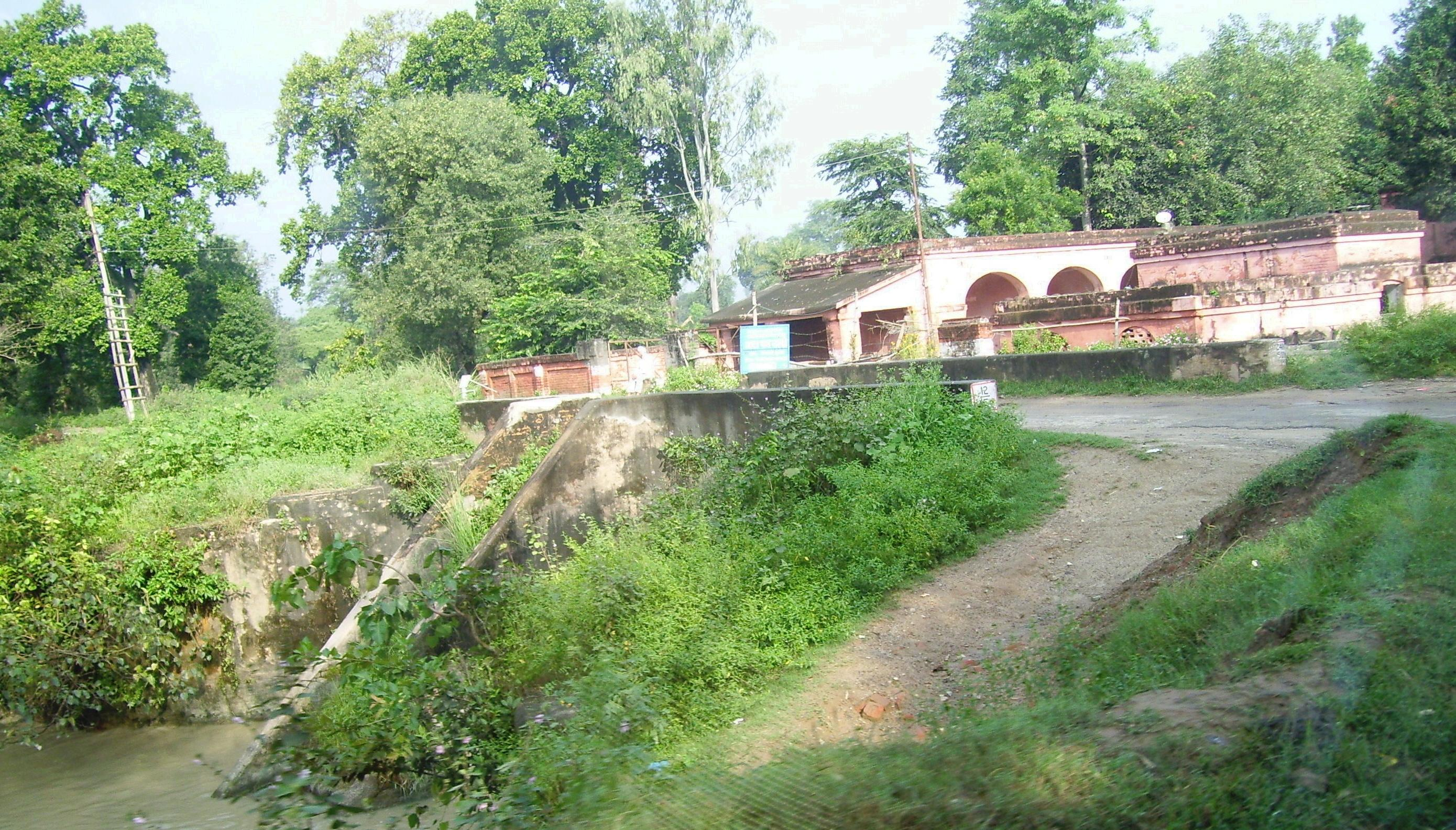
A water mill on the canal.

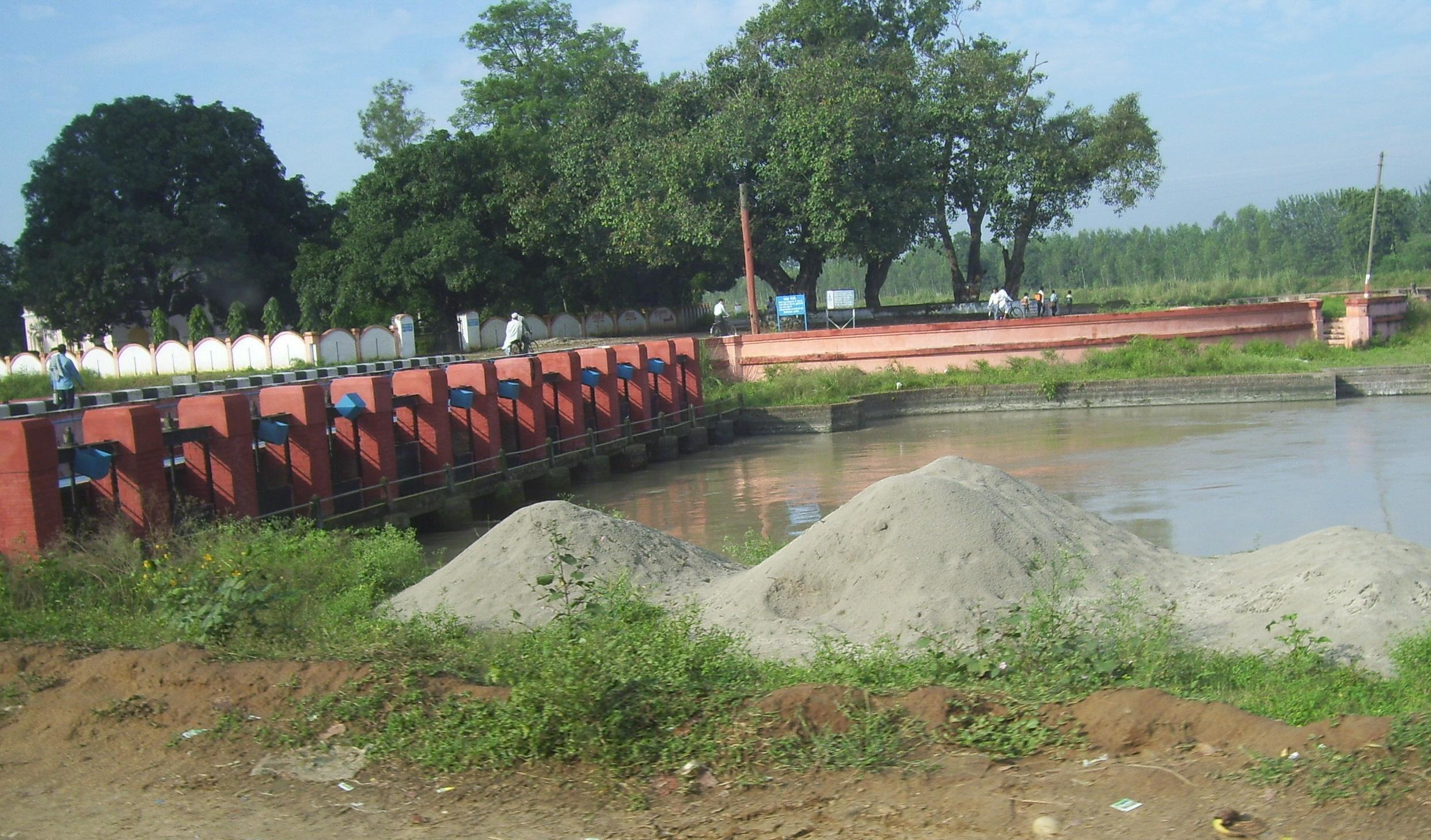
150-year-old locks on the canal.
