= Harduaganj Thermal Power Station =

Power station in Uttar Pradesh, India

- Country: India
- Location: Harduaganj, Aligarh district, Uttar Pradesh
- Coordinates: 28°01′03″N 78°07′48″E
- Commission date: 1942
- Owner: Uttar Pradesh Rajya Vidyut Utpadan Nigam Limited

Thermal power station
- Primary fuel: Coal

Power generation
- Units operational: 1×660 MW; 1x110 MW; 2X250 MW
- Nameplate capacity: 1270 MW

Harduaganj Thermal Power Station is located at Qasimpur Power House Colony which is 1 km distance from Harduaganj railway station at Harduaganj in Aligarh district in the Indian state of Uttar Pradesh, about 18 km from Aligarh and 105 km from Agra. It is the new electric power station established in Aligarh district; the old one is Sumera Hydroelectric Power Plant located in Jawan Sikandarpur of Aligarh district.

The coal for this power plant is sourced from coal mines owned by BCCL and ECL and are transported to the power plant through rail line. The power plant is owned and operated by Uttar Pradesh Rajya Vidyut Utpadan Nigam.

== Operations ==
The plant has three stages, first two stages having 7 units capacity ranging between 30 MW to 55 MW were over three decade old and all are closed now. The machinery of currently functioning units are from Bharat Heavy Electricals Limited. The coal for all these units is fed from the coal mines of Bharat Coking Coal Limited and Eastern Coalfields Limited by means of the railways. This place is also known as Qasimpur Power House. It has two colonies for the employee resident, old colony and new colony and a main market known as dus dukan.

In 2008, Unit-5 of 60 MW capacity, lying defunct since 1999, and renovated at a cost of 33 crore started generating power once again. The same unit was closed and the capacity was deleted from UPRVUNL generation capacity in July 2017.

== Capacity ==
Harduaganj Thermal Power Station has an installed capacity of 1270 MW.

In July 2014 state government decided to add another unit of 660 MW to the power plant. July 2015: The 660 MW unit has been constructed by Toshiba . Thus it has achieved the capacity of 1270 MW

Stage	Installed Capacity (MW)	Date of Commissioning	Status
CTPS	60	1977 May	Deleted
CTPS	110	1978 August	Renovated and Running
HTPS Extn.	250	2012 February	Running
HTPS Extn.	250	2013 October	Running
HTPS Extn.	660	2022 January	Running

== See also ==
- Sumera Hydroelectric Power Plant
- Kasimpur Power House
- Harduaganj
