= Pala Kastali =

- Village
- Interactive map of Pala Kastali
- Coordinates: 27°59′21″N 78°04′42″E
- Country: India
- State: Uttar Pradesh
- District: Aligarh

Government
  - Body: Gram panchayat

Languages
  - Official: Hindi
- Time zone: UTC+5:30 (IST)
- PIN: 202122
- Vehicle registration: UP
- Website: up.gov.in

Pala Kastali is a village in Block Jawan Sikandarpur, Aligarh district of Uttar Pradesh, India. It is 5 kilometres (3 mi) from Aligarh. The village has most population of Bais Rajput. Pala Kastali's Pin Code is 202122. The nearest railway station is Manzurgarhi; the nearest airport is Agra Airport. The school near the village is Blackdale public school.
