= Sumera Hydroelectric Power Plant =

Coordinates: 28°02′26.54″N 078°06′51.06″E

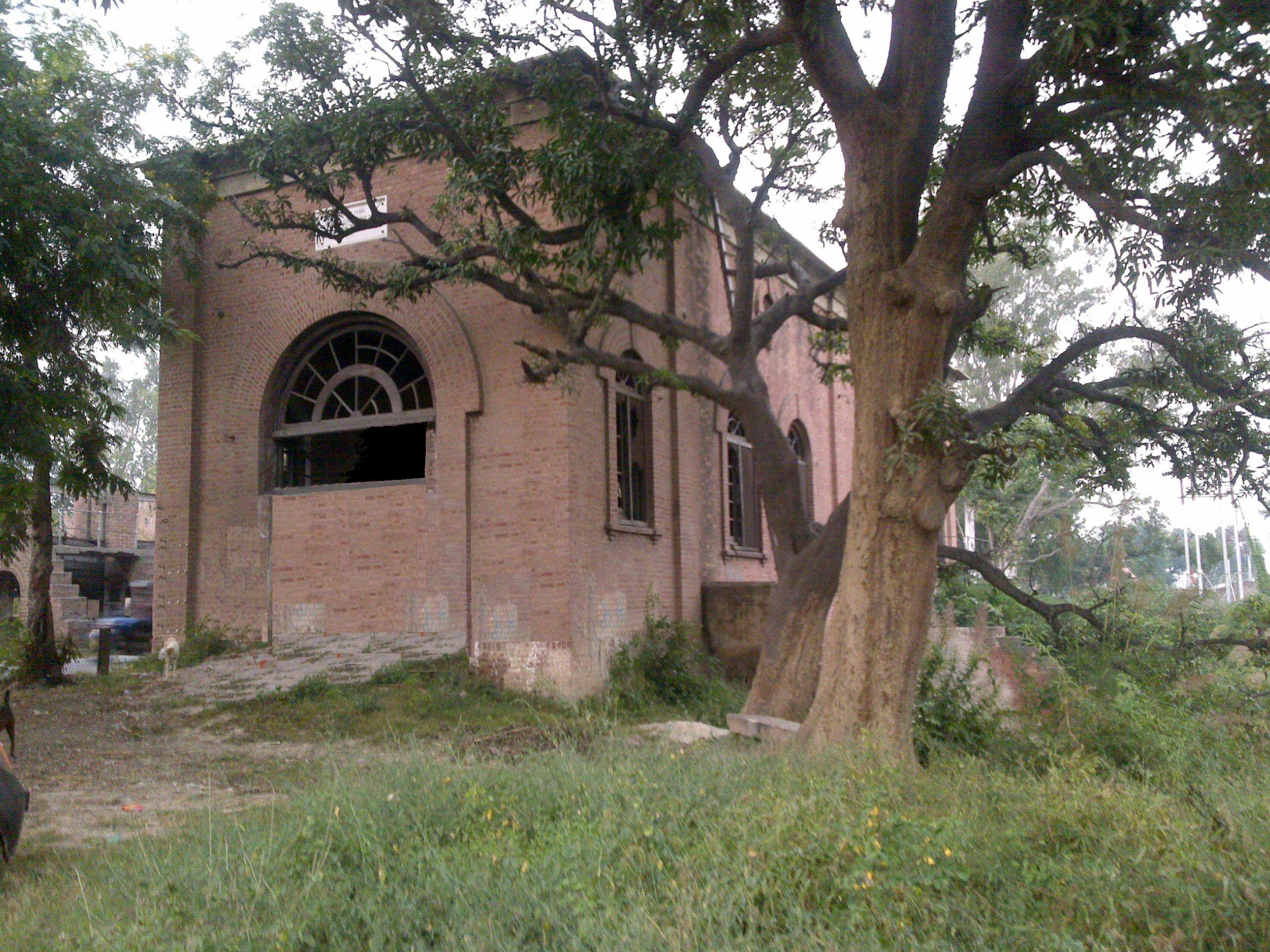
This is a photograph of the Sumera Hydroelectric Power Plant. This is a view of the front side of the main building. This plant was established by the British in India in 1931.

Sumera Hydroelectric Power Plant is one of the oldest hydroelectric power plants or hydel power stations in India. It is located at Sumera Dariyapur in Jawan Sikandarpur of Aligarh District, Uttar Pradesh, India.

== Approach ==
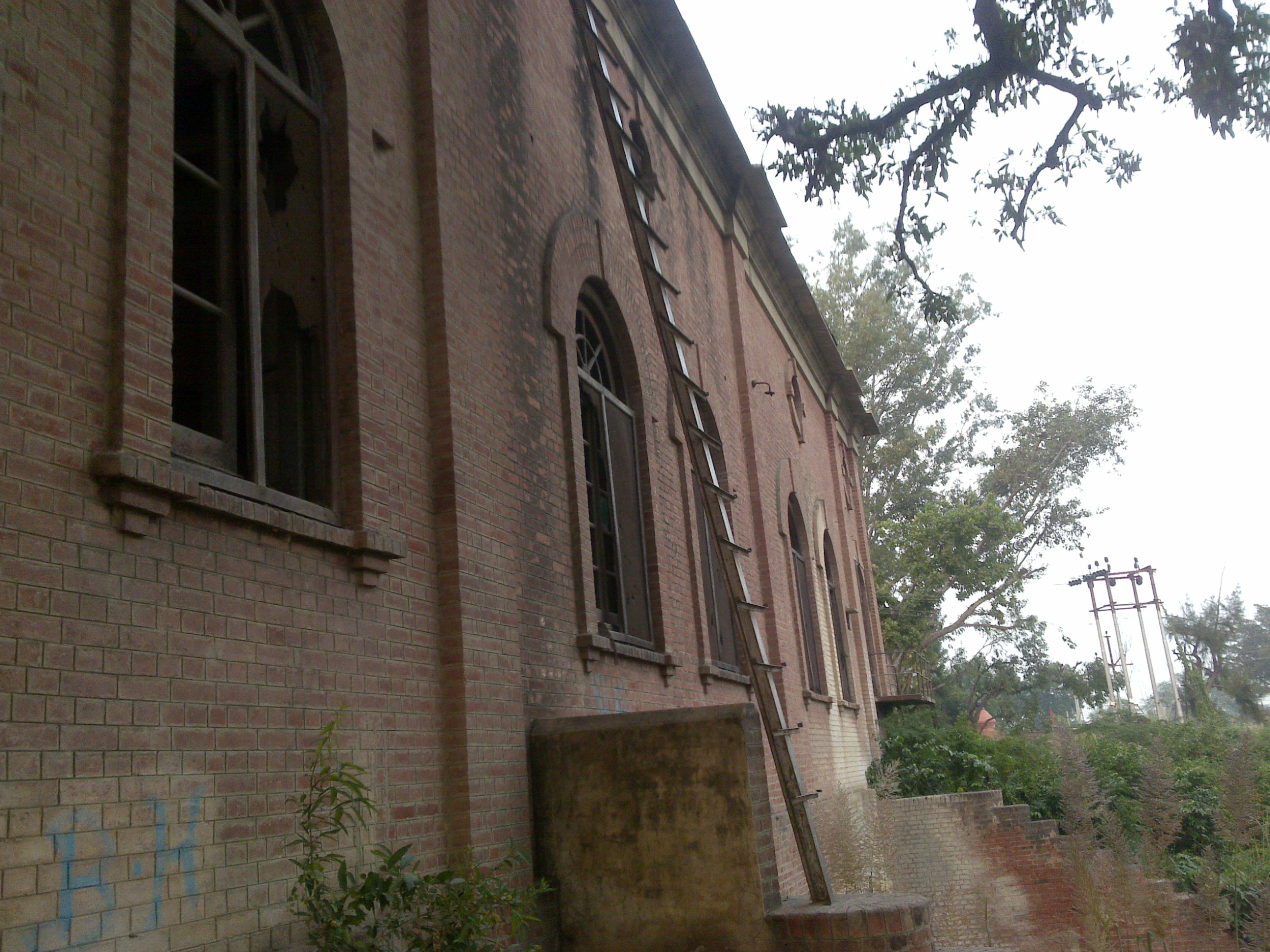
This is a photograph of the Sumera Hydroelectric Power Plant. This is a view of the left side of the main building.

Jawan Sikandarpur is situated on the Aligarh-Moradabad Highway (Anoopshahar Road) at a distance of 16 kilometres (9.9 miles) from Aligarh. It is 3 kilometres (1.9 miles) from Qasimpur Power House Colony and 2 kilometres (1.2 miles) from Harduaganj Thermal Power Station. The building of the Sumera Hydroelectric Power Plant is situated just near the Highway where the Ganges Canal (or the Ganga Canal) flows under the Jawan Bridge (also spelled as Jawaa Bridge).

== History ==
=== Establishment of Jawan Sikandarpur and Sumera Dariyapur ===
Raja Kulan Singh had three sons, Jauhar Singh, Sumer Singh and Tikam Singh. The elder son Jauhar Singh established Jawan Sikandarpur.Sumera Dariyapur was named after Sumer Singh.

=== The origins and development of hydroelectric and thermal power systems in India ===
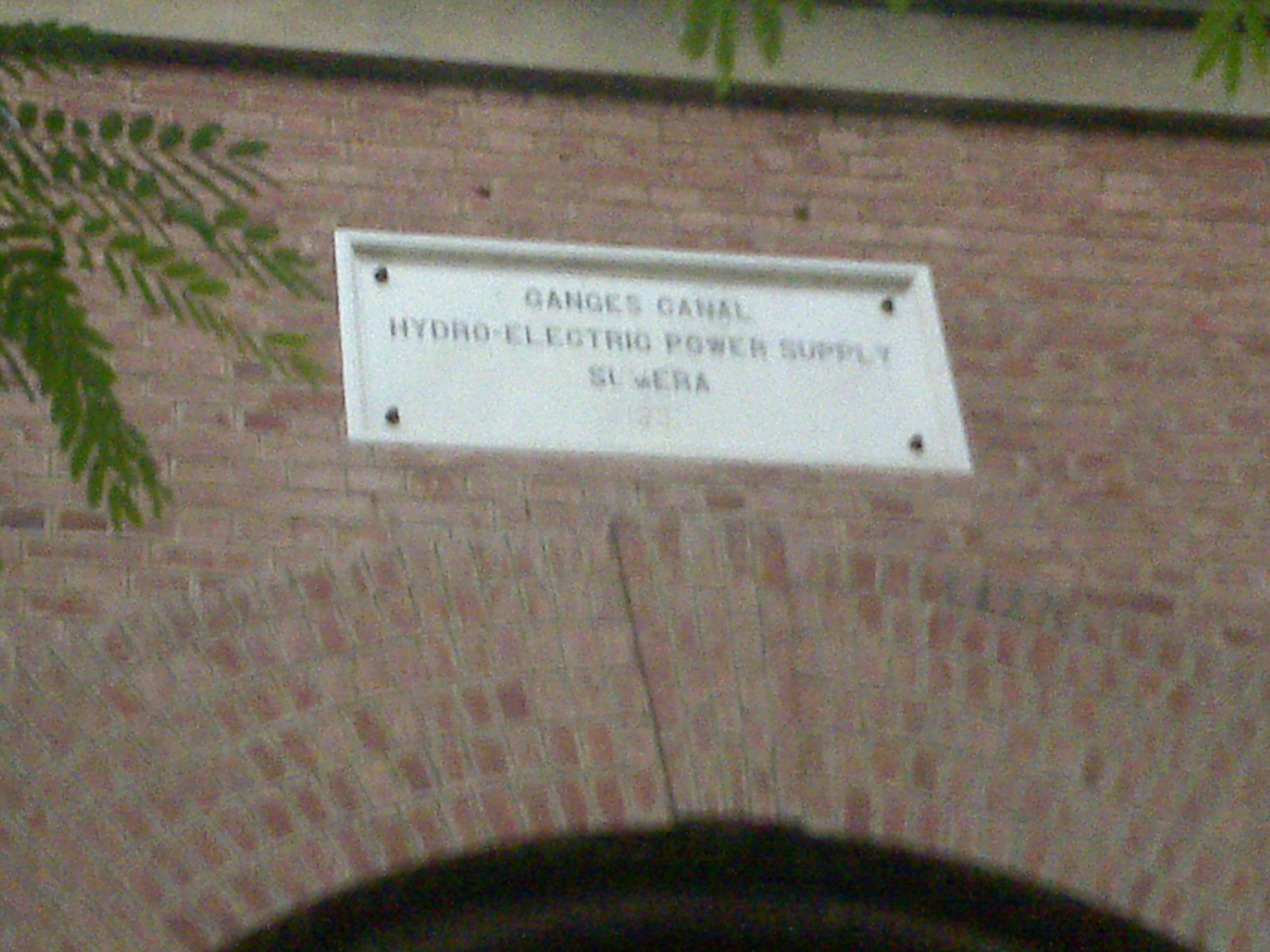
This is a photograph of the Sumera Hydroelectric Power Plant. This is a view of the front side of the main building focussing on the name-plate.

Most of the early power generating stations,(including Sumera) which were developed when India was a colony of the British, were hydro-electric in nature. These pre-independence generating stations fed loads in the urban areas and electrification of the villages was done mostly after 1947.

=== Establishment of the power plant ===
Sumera Hydroelectric Power Plant was established by the British in 1931. The electricity generated from this plant was sufficient for the small population of Aligarh at that time. It is situated just near the Jawan Bridge. The building itself is a masterpiece of British architecture, combined with both beauty and strength. It was a small hydro plant. Its power capacity was 2,000 kW. A brief description of the building, location and date was written on a name-plate fixed high on the front elevation. (Shown in the 3rd photograph from the above). It reads as :

"Ganges Canal Hydro-electrical Power Supply Sumera 1931"

== Water source and the construction of the dams ==
The Ganges Canal (or the Ganga Canal) was used as a source of water for generating electricity. A dam was constructed on the Ganges Canal for the purpose. Another dam was also constructed near the Communical Health Centre.

Therefore, the dams constructed on the Ganges Canal in Jawan Sikandarpur are as follows:

(i)Jawan Dam was constructed near the Sumera Hydroelectric Power Plant to use the Ganges Canal as a source of water for generating electricity from the Sumera Hydroelectric Power Plant. Over the Jawan Dam, a bridge called as the Jawan Bridge was constructed, over which the Aligarh-Moradabad Highway passes now.

(ii)Ganga Dam was constructed near the Communical Health Centre.

== Other power stations in or around Aligarh ==
- Harduaganj Thermal Power Station in Aligarh.
- NTPC Dadri in Dadri, Gautam Budh Nagar.
- Palra Hydroelectric Power Plant in Bulandshahar.
- Narora Atomic Power Station in Bulandshahar.
- Faridabad Thermal Power Station in Faridabad.

In total there are 13 power stations in Uttar Pradesh and 110 power stations in India.

== Upper Ganga Canal power projects ==
There are 13 small waterfalls on the Upper Ganga Canal starting from Haridwar (where the Ganga enters the plains) to Aligarh. These power houses (along with their power capacity) are mentioned here:

(i) Bahadurabad (Bahadurabad and Salempur Waterfalls) (with the power capacity of 4,400 kW)
(ii) Pathari in Haridwar (2 lakh kW)
(iii) Mohammedpur in Haridwar (3,000 kW)
(iv) Nirgajni in Muzaffarnagar (5,000 kW)
(v) Chittora in Muzaffarnagar (3,000 kW)
(vi) Salawa in Meerut (3,000 kW)
(vii) Meerut (2,700 kW)
(viii) Palra in Bulandshahar (6,000 kW)
(ix) Sumera in Aligarh (2,000 kW)

Most of the power energises tube-wells which irrigate 14 districts of Uttar Pradesh.

== The current status ==
Currently the Sumera Hydroelectric Power Plant is not operational.

At present Sumera Hydroelectric Power Plant and Palra Hydroelectric Power Plant in Bulandshahar have both been abandoned.
