= Masuri, Ghaziabad =

Village in Uttar Pradesh, India

Masuri
- Village
- Location within Uttar Pradesh Location within India
- Coordinates: 28°41′08″N 77°33′13″E
- Country: India
- State: Uttar Pradesh
- District: Ghaziabad
- Tehsil: Ghaziabad

Area
  - Total: 2.53 km^{2} (0.98 sq mi)
- Elevation: 216 m (709 ft)

Population (2011)
  - Total: 22,934
  - Density: 9,060/km^{2} (23,500/sq mi)
- Time zone: UTC+5:30 (IST)
- PIN: 201015

Masuri is a Village in Ghaziabad Tehsil, Ghaziabad District, Uttar Pradesh, India. It is situated on the western bank of Upper Ganga Canal, approximately 16 kilometres northeast of the district and tehsil seat Ghaziabad. In the year 2011, the Village has a total population of 22,934.

== Geography ==
Masuri is located in the south of Nahal Village, west of Parson Village, north of Piplehda Village, and east of Dasna Dehat Village. Harpur Road passes through the Village. The Village's average elevation is 216 metres above the sea level.

== Demographics ==
According to the 2011 Census of India, the Village has 3,466 households and 22,934 residents. Among the population, 12,108 are male and 10,826 are female. The total literacy rate is 54.65%, with 7,467 of the male population and 5,066 of the female population being literate.
