= Indira Indu =

Indira 'Indu'
- Born: Morena, Madhya Pradesh, India
- Died: Morena, Madhya Pradesh

Indira Indu was a Hindi poet from Morena, Madhya Pradesh, India

== Biography ==
Her great-grandfather Nathuram "Shankar" Sharma was poet of Hindi literature, and her grandfather Hari Shankar Sharma and father Kripa Shankar Sharma were also well known Hindi poets. She wrote about Indian ladies.
