= Nathuram Sharma =

Hindi/Urdu poet (1859–1932)

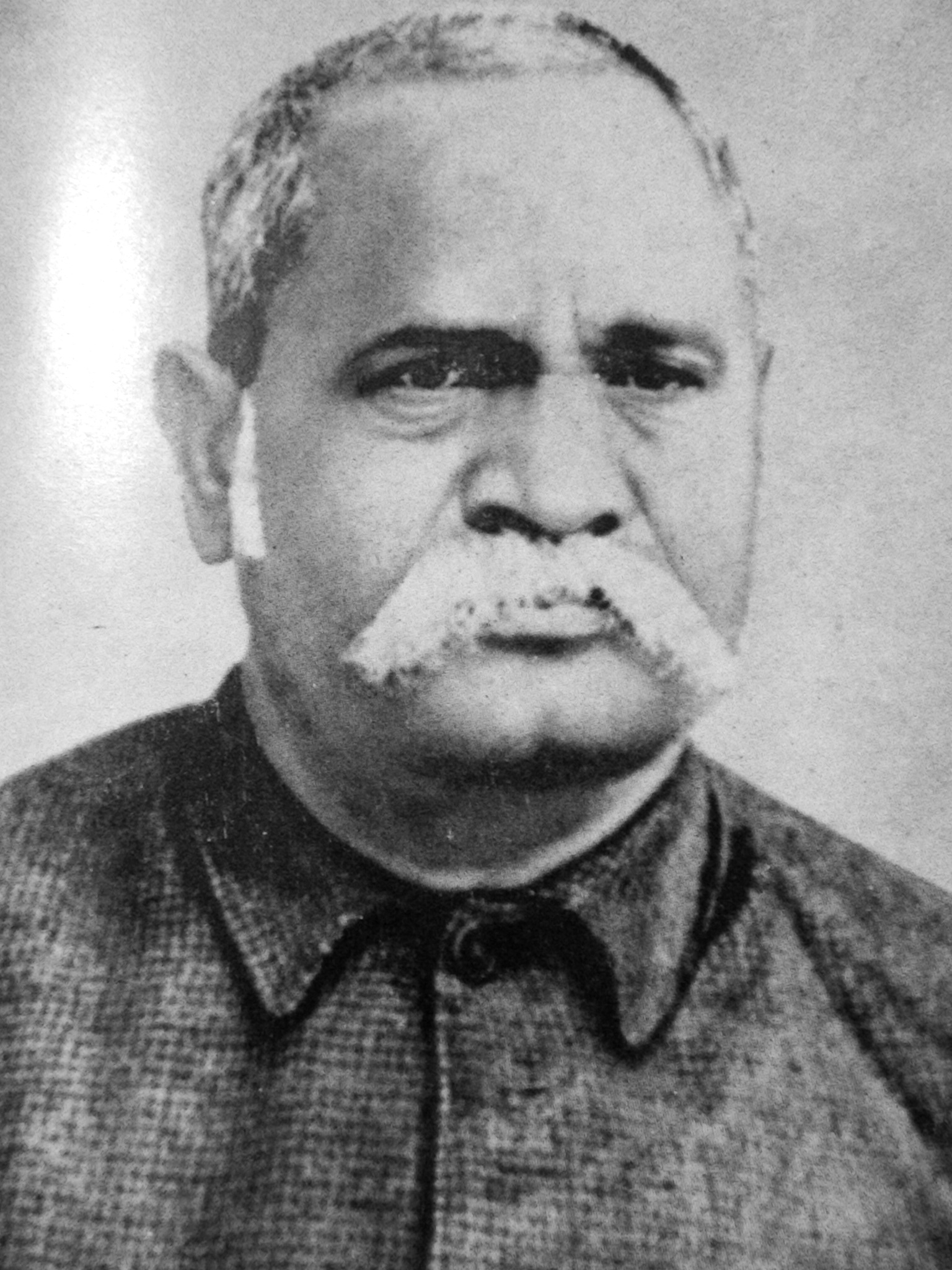
- Born: 1859 Harduaganj, North-Western Provinces, British India
- Died: 21 August 1932 (aged 73) Harduaganj, United Provinces, British India
- Children: Hari Shankar Sharma

Website
- jaischauhan.blogspot.in

Nathuram Sharma (1859 – 21 August 1932), better known by his pen-name Mahakavi Shankar, was a Hindi and Urdu poet from Harduaganj, Aligarh, North-Western Provinces (now Uttar Pradesh), British India. He worked with the Irrigation Department at Kanpur and subsequently as an Ayurvedic physician. His poetic works are primarily in the dialects of Braj Bhasha and Khariboli. He was a writer of Modern Period.

== Early life ==
Shankar was born in Gaur Brahmin family to Pandit Rupram Sharma 1859 in Harduaganj, Aligarh, North-Western Provinces (now Uttar Pradesh), British India, and received his early education at the local primary school. In 1874, when he was a student of the Middle Class, English Educational Inspector E. T. Constable inspected the school. Constable was impressed with his talent and knowledge and commented in the inspection book: "Nathuram is an intelligent student, full of promise."

Shankar knew Sanskrit and Persian as well as Hindi and Urdu. He was a contributor to Saraswati, the literary journal of Mahavir Prasad Dwivedi.

== Poetic works ==
Shankar's poetic works include: Anurag ratna, Shankar saroj, Garbhranda rahasya, Gitavali, Kavita kunj, Doha, Samasyapurtiyan, Vividh rachnayen, Kalit kalewar and Shankar Satsai. Influenced by the Arya Samaj movement, he was a social reformer who used his mastery of language effectively to this purpose.

He was referred to as Mahakavi meaning Great Poet.

== Death ==
Shankar died on 21 August 1932 at Harduaganj, Aligarh, North-Western Provinces, British India.

== Lineage ==
Shankar was the father of Hindi poet Hari Shankar Sharma, grandfather of Hindi poet and writer Kripa Shankar Sharma and great-grandfather of Hindi poet Indira Indu.
