= Charles Cecil Stevens =

Sir Charles Cecil Stevens KCSI

Personal details
- Born: 5 July 1840 Tahiti
- Died: 24 March 1909 (aged 68)
- Education: University of Melbourne

Sir Charles Cecil Stevens KCSI (5 July 1840, Tahiti – 24 March 1909) was an Australian civil servant who was the lieutenant governor of the province of Bengal, representing the British Raj in India. He is credited for having supervised the foundation of the Sidrapong Hydel Power Station, the first of its kind in Asia.

He was educated at the University of Melbourne. He died in Kensington in 1909 following a bout of influenza.

Government offices
Preceded by Alexander Mackenzie	Lieutenant-governor of Bengal; 1897–1898	Succeeded by John Woodburn
