= John Woodburn (civil servant) =

Indian politician

Sir John Woodburn KCSI (13 July 1843 – 21 November 1902) was an Indian Civil Servant, who later served as Lieutenant Governor of Bengal from 1898 to 1902.

== Early life and education ==
Woodburn was born at Barrackpore in British India to David Woodburn. After early education at Arya Academy in Bengal, he went to Scotland to study at Glasgow University and Edinburgh University.

== Career ==
Woodburn joined the Indian Civil Service in 1863 and arrived in India. He spent most of his early career serving in various positions across the North-Western Provinces and Oudh. After his initial years in Oudh, he became secretary to the government of the North Western Provinces in 1882. From 1888 to 1893, he served as Chief Secretary of the province. During this period, he was also appointed an additional member of the Viceroy's Executive Council in 1980. In 1893, he was appointed Chief Commissioner of the Central Provinces, a post he held until 1895.

He was in 1895 asked by the new Viceroy, Lord Elgin to become a permanent member of the Viceroy's Executive Council, with responsibility for the Home department. During his time in this office he had to deal with the severe famine of 1896–98. The famine especially affected the Central provinces he had just left, and he worked closely with the new governor Sir Sir Charles Lyall to contain the suffering. He was appointed a Companion of the Order of the Star of India (CSI) in 1892, and was knighted as a Knight Commander (KCSI) in the order in 1897.

== Lieutenant-Governor of Bengal ==
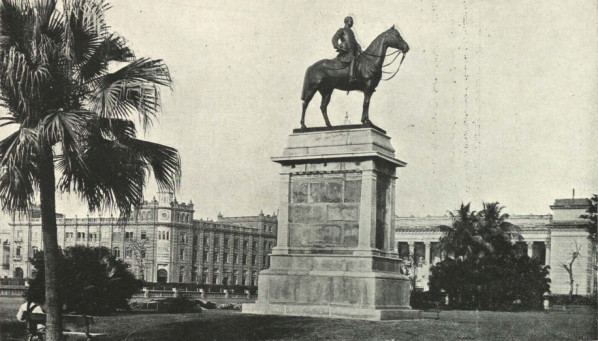
Statue of Sir John Woodburn, which earlier stood at Dalhousie Square, Calcutta. Image of 1905

In April 1898, he was selected the successor of Sir Charles Stevens to the post of the Lieutenant Governor of Bengal, which position he retained till his death on 21 November 1902. During his years in Calcutta he worked to contain the plague taking hold in the city and presidency, and took an interest in local institutions in the city, which he preferred to his summer capital of Darjeeling. Woodburn worked hard for the development of jail and health administration of Bengal. He travelled extensively in the city and throughout the province. In their obituary, The London Times described his years in Bengal the following way:

Though perhaps not the intellectual equal of some others who have ruled in Bengal and the North-Western Provinces in recent days, he possessed in high degree the faculty of getting the very best out of all his subordinates, by whom he was greatly beloved. A man of singular suavity of demeanor, he owned in full measure that delightful courtesy, often called old-fashioned, but never out of fashion, so long as its manifestation proceeds from a kind and generous heart. Since Sir Frederick Halliday became her first Lieutenant-Governor in 1854, Bengal had never had a more popular ruler, and his success was the more remarkable because his whole service had been passed in other provinces, while that of Bengal is perhaps, not without reason, proud of its pre-eminence in area, revenue, and population.

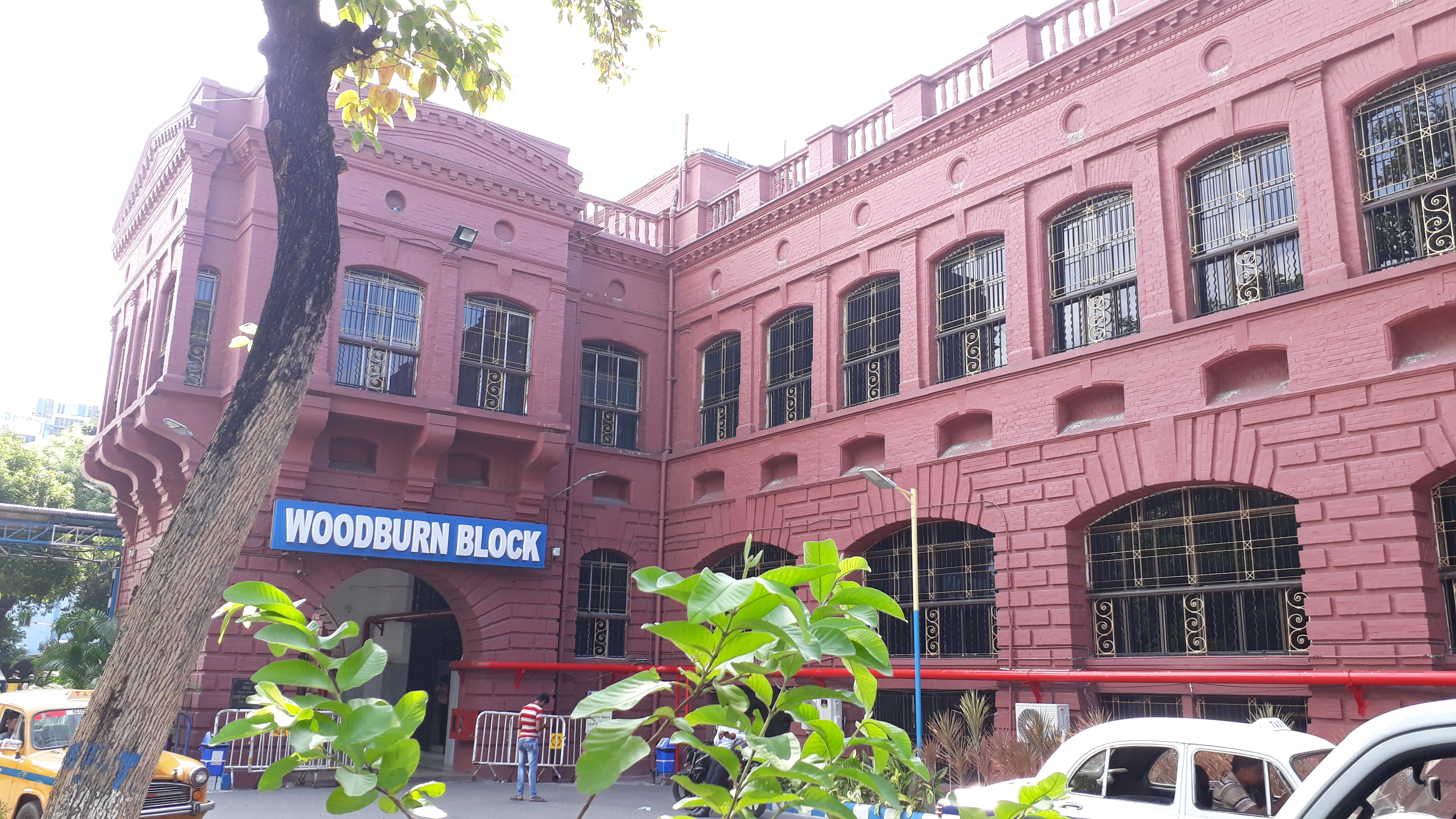
The Woodburn Block in P.G Hospital named after sir John Woodburn

He served as president of The Asiatic Society for the years 1900–01.

Woodburn died after a short illness at Calcutta on 21 November 1902, and was buried at Circular Road Cemetery of Calcutta.

He was succeeded by Sir Andrew Fraser as next Governor of Bengal.

== Family ==
Woodburn married in 1869 Isabella Cassels Walker, daughter of Mr. John Walker, of Drumgrange, Ayrshire, and they had several daughters.

== Works ==
Woodburn's published works include his memoirs Sir John Woodburn, K.C.S.I., Lieut.-Governor of Bengal from 1898 to 1902: a Biographical Retrospect by Sir John Woodburn (K.C.S.I.), Jessy J. Matheson. published in 1926.

== Memorials ==
- A bronze statue of him was unveiled in 1905, which earlier stood at Dalhouse Square of Kolkata - has now been shifted to Victoria Memorial.
- A street in Kolkata was named after him, as Woodburn Street in Kolkata.
- A park is named as Woodburn Park after him and road was earlier known as Woodburn Park Road also at Kolkata.
- Woodburn Block of SSKM Hospital, Kolkata is also named after him, where at present special patients like VVIP, VIP are treated.

Preceded by Charles Stevens	Lieutenant-governor of Bengal; 1898–1902	Succeeded by A. H. L. Fraser
