= Hari Shankar Sharma =

Indian Hindi and Urdu poet

Hari Shanka Sharma
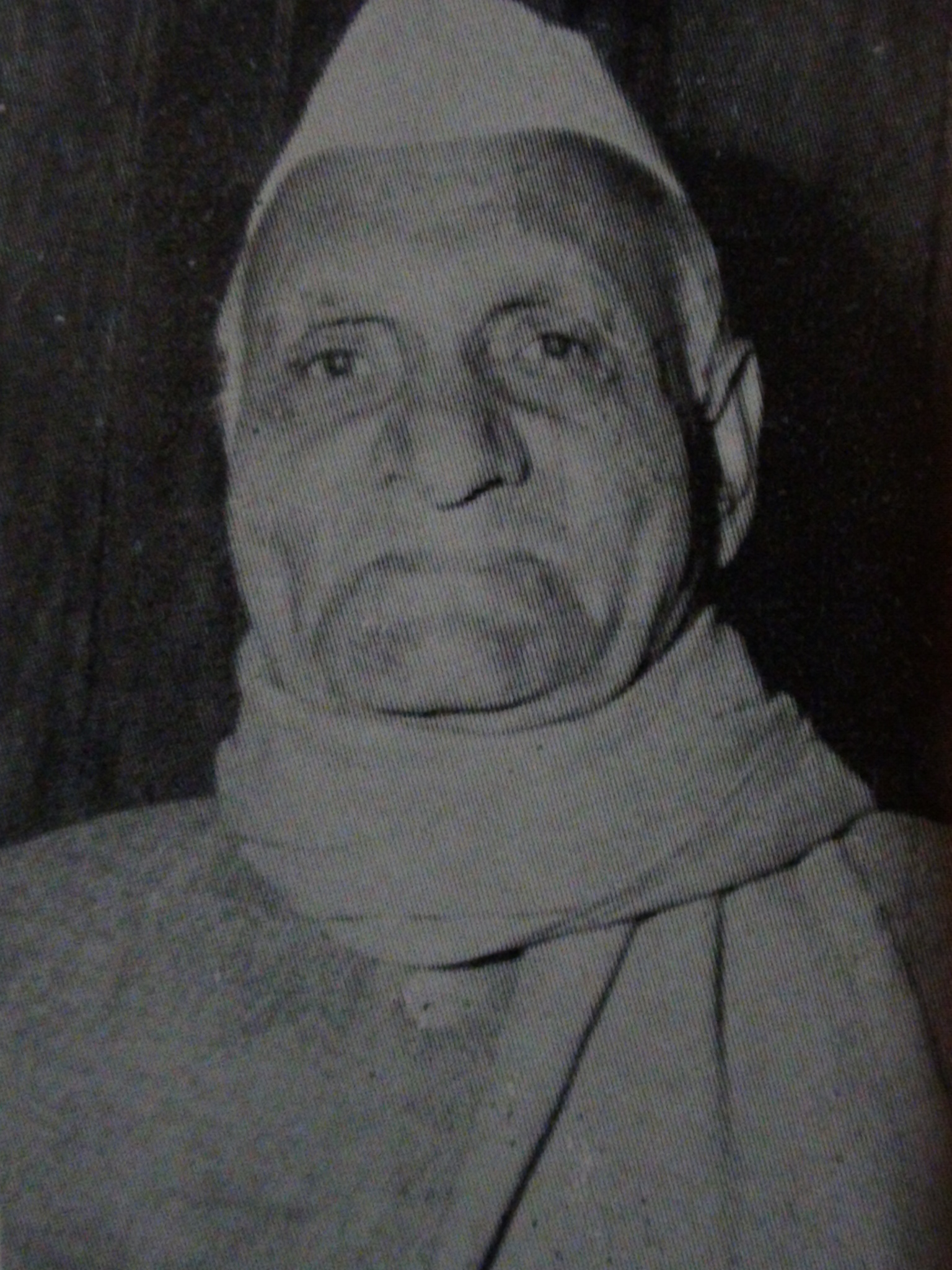
- Born: 1891
- Died: 1968 (aged 76–77)
- Occupation: Poet
- Children: Kripa Shankar Sharma
- Writing career
- Notable work: Ghaas-Paat, Ram-Rajya, Krishan-Sandesh, and Maharshi-Mahima.
- Notable awards: Padma Shri

Hari Shankar Sharma (1891–1968) was a Hindi and Urdu poet from Harduaganj, Aligarh, India.

He was awarded the Padma Shri by Government of India, in 1966.

== Biography ==
Hari Shanka Sharma was born in Harduaganj, Aligarh, North-Western Provinces (Now Uttar Pradesh), British India. He was the son of Famous Hindi poet Nathuram Sharma, He is associated with notables poets and writers such as Amritlal Nagar, Banarasi Das Chaturvedi, Babu Gulabrai, Ram Vilas Sharma and Rangeya Raghav.

== Poetic works ==
Sharma's poetic works include: Ghaas-Paat, Ram-Rajya, Krishan-Sandesh, and Maharshi-Mahima.

== Books ==
Sharma wrote many books, such as Adikala ka Hindi gadya sahitya, Adikalina Hindi sahitya shodha, Prayini and Ramrajya.

== Award ==
- Padma Shri in 1966 for Literature & Education
- D Litt. from Agra University
- Dev Award for 'Ghaas-Paar'
