= Dasna Dehat =

Village in Uttar Pradesh, India

Dasnat Dehat
- Village
- Location within Uttar Pradesh Location within India
- Coordinates: 28°41′19″N 77°31′52″E
- Country: India
- State: Uttar Pradesh
- District: Ghaziabad
- Tehsil: Ghaziabad

Government
  - Type: Gram Panchayat

Area
  - Total: 18.93 km^{2} (7.31 sq mi)
- Elevation: 215 m (705 ft)

Population (2011)
  - Total: 43,722
  - Density: 2,310/km^{2} (5,982/sq mi)

Languages
  - Official: Hindi
- Time zone: UTC+5:30 (IST)
- PIN: 201015
- STD code: 0120
- Vehicle registration: UP-14

Dasna Dehat is a village in the suburb of Ghaziabad, Ghaziabad District, Uttar Pradesh, India. It is located near the national capital New Delhi, about 13 kilometres east of the district and tehsil seat Ghaziabad. In 2011, It has a population of 43,722.

== Geography ==
Dasna Dehat is located in the west of Upper Ganga Canal. Asian Highway 2 and Eastern Peripheral Expressway intersect within the village. It covers an area of 1893.11 hectares.

== Demographics ==
According to the 2011 Census of India, Dasna Dehat has 6,883 households within its boundary. Among the 43,722 residents, 24,787 are male and 18,935 are female. The total literacy rate is 59.90%, with 16,754 of the male population and 9,437 of the female population being literate. The census location code for this village is 119742.
