= Arya Tea Estate =

Indian tea garden

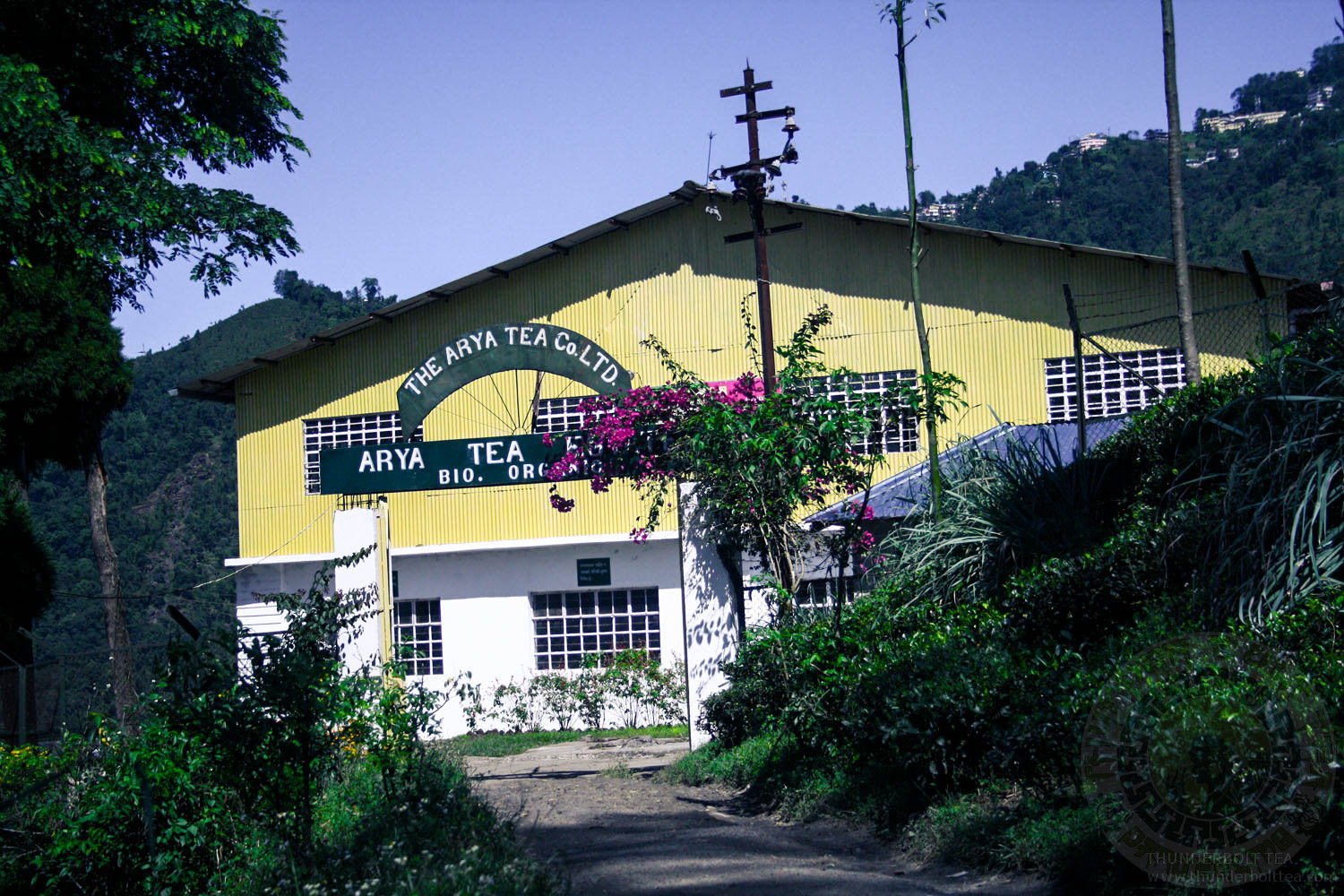
- Interactive map of Arya Tea Estate
- Location: Darjeeling district, West Bengal, India
- Coordinates: 27.0436°N 88.2392°E
- Area: 125 ha (310 acres)
- Elevation: 900 to 1,820 m (2,950 to 5,970 ft)
- Owner: Arya Tea Company Ltd.
- Open: 1885

Arya Tea Estate is a tea garden in the Darjeeling Pulbazar CD block in the Darjeeling Sadar subdivision of the Darjeeling district in West Bengal, India.

== History ==
Darjeeling
TE: tea estate, F: facility, T: religious place, I: institute
Abbreviations used in names – TE for Tea Estate
Owing to space constraints in the small map, the actual locations in a larger map may vary slightly
All places marked in the map are linked in the larger full screen map

The Arya Tea Estate was established in 1885 and originally known as Sidrabong. Legend tells that the garden was founded by the monks who developed and cultivated different varieties of Chinese seeds. The house inhabited in the 19th century can still be found on the estate. The original factory was destroyed by a fire in May 1999, leading to the construction of a new.

== Geography ==
The plantation starts at an altitude of 1820 and spreads down to 900 meters, with an average elevation of about 1,500. It produces around 70 tons of tea annually. Some of its most famous teas are Jewel range, including Ruby, Emerald, Pearl, Diamond and Topaz. All of their Jewel range teas are produced from special clonal bushes, mainly from AV2 varietal planted on the highest point of the tea garden area. These teas are often produced in very limited quantities and only a few re-sellers get it. They also produce classic varieties of chinary teas labelled as "FTGFOP1" and some with musky flavors as muscatel.

The roads leading to the estate are extremely cumbersome, often with a gradient of up to 45 degrees, making it extremely difficult to drive. Only the tea garden drivers are experienced enough to drive the Arya terrain. The monsoon season proves dangerous due to extremely slippery road conditions. During the winter months, all estates in Darjeeling go under dormant conditions due to extreme cold, until the harvests begin in February.

== Economy ==
Arya Tea Estate is a manufacturer of specialty teas for international sale, as part of the Indian holding company Eurasia Group. The estate sits at an average altitude of 1500 metres and covers 125 hectares, with just over 300 acres (1.2 km^{2}) under tea plantation. Arya Tea Estate does business as Arya Tea Co. Ltd., Kolkata and its operations are certified organic. Additionally, Arya is a certified member of the Darjeeling Tea Association.
