= Qasimpur Power House Colony =

- Census town
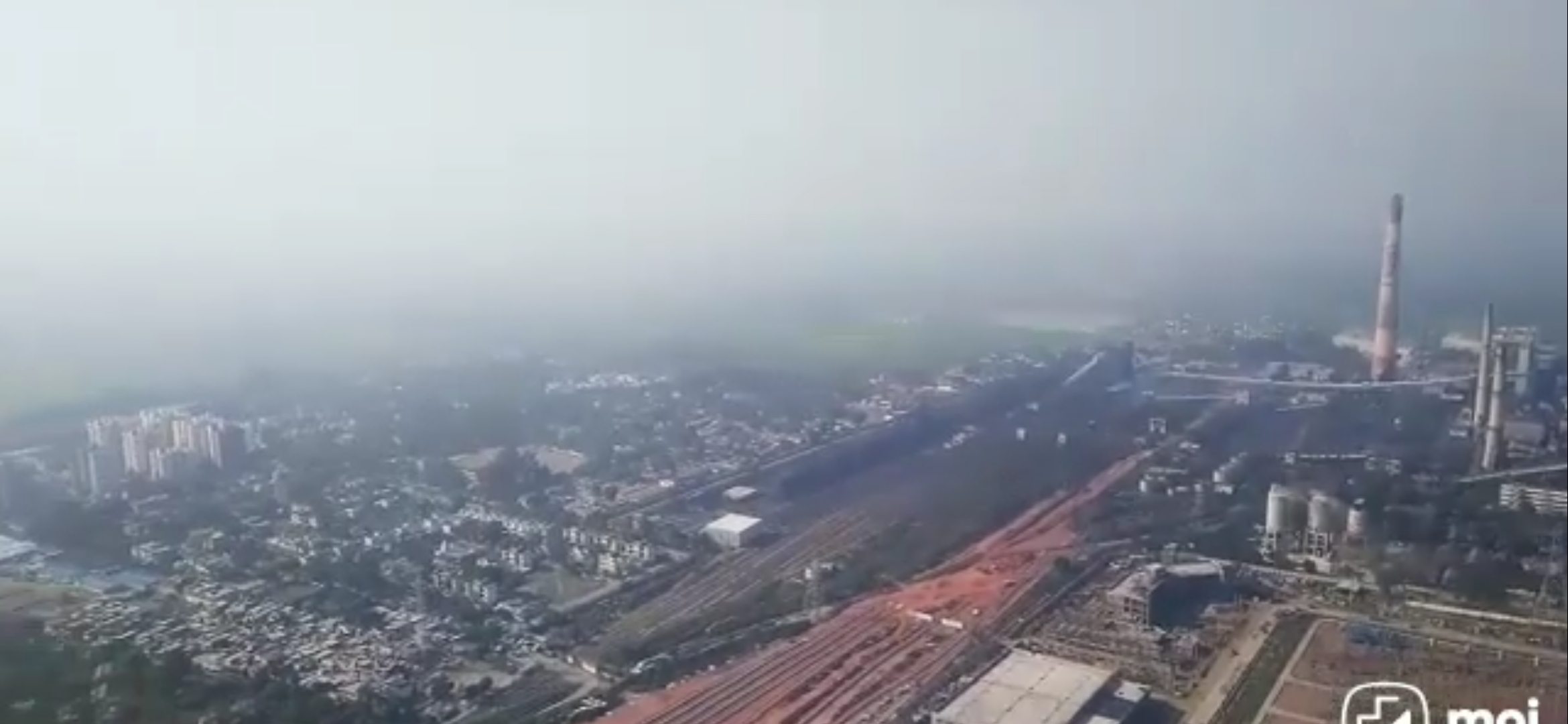

- Location in Uttar Pradesh, India
- Coordinates: 28.013°N 78.126°E
- Country: India
- State: Uttar Pradesh
- District: Aligarh

Population (2011)
  - Total: 7,791

Language
  - Official: Hindi
  - Additional official: Urdu
- Time zone: UTC+5:30 (IST)
- PIN: 202127

Qasimpur Power House Colony is a census town in Aligarh district in the Indian state of Uttar Pradesh. It was established for the employees of Harduaganj Thermal Power Station. It is situated on Aligarh-Moradabad highway at a distance of 16 km from Aligarh and 40 km from Khair.

== Demographics ==
As of 2001 India census, Kasimpur Power House Colony had a population of 13,754. Males constitute 53% of the population and females 47%. Kasimpur Power House Colony has an average literacy rate of 78%, higher than the national average of 59.5%: male literacy is 85%, and female literacy is 71%. In Kasimpur Power House Colony, 11% of the population is under 6 years of age.

== Project colonies ==
- Old Colony
- New Colony (both are divide by Rly. track)
- New Colony Park

== Infrastructures ==
Harduaganj Thermal Power Station was established in 1942 during Second World War. The old plant has been demobilized and a new 660 MW Super Critical Thermal Power Unit Establishment has been started by the M/s. Toshiba JSW Systems Power Ltd and Doosan Power System Ltd. Harduaganj Thermal Power Plant "B" has a total of seven units for production but only three units (total capacity 620 MW) are running. A new project started at Kasimpur Power House Toshiba in 2016.

== See also ==
- Harduaganj -
- Harduaganj Thermal Power Station, - The plant is known as Harduaganj Thermal Power plant situated at Kasimpur Power House but Harduaganj town is on different route and 12 km away from the power plant.

Harduaganj Thermal Power Station situated at Kasimpur is linked with the city of Aligarh by local road transport facility. Auto-rickshaws link Kasimpur power house with Ghantaghar, whereas buses run on Ramghat road between Quarsi chauraha and Jawan Sikandarpur.

- Jawan Sikandarpur
- Chauhan Indravati Inter College
- Kasimpur Village
