= Harduaganj =

- Town
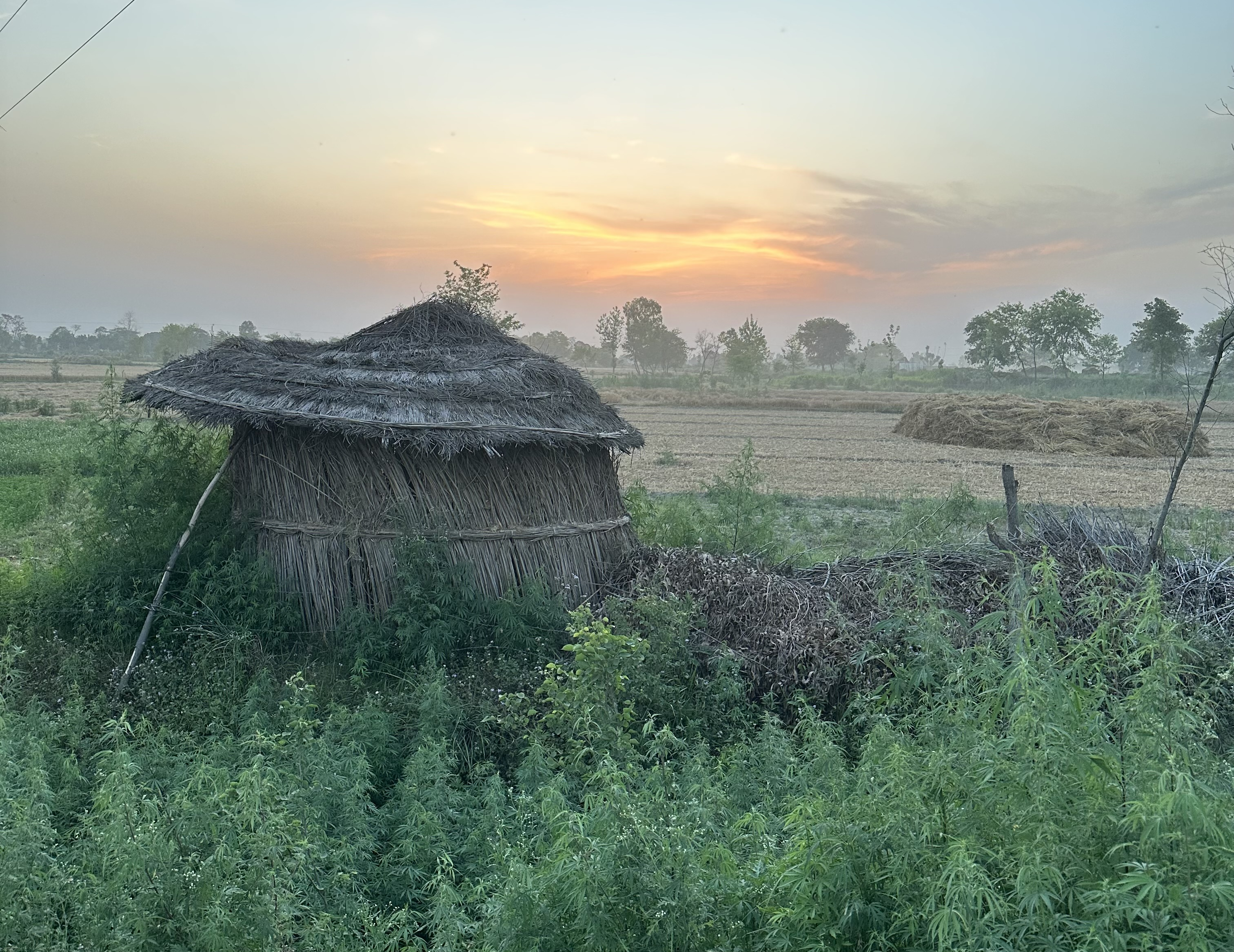
- Harduaganj wheat field

- Location in Uttar Pradesh, India Harduaganj (India)
- Coordinates: 27.95°N 78.17°E
- Country: India
- State: Uttar Pradesh
- District: Aligarh
- Founder: Dauji (Brother of Lord Krishna)
- Elevation: 177 m (581 ft)

Population (2011)
  - Total: 13,690

Language
  - Official: Hindi
  - Additional official: Urdu
- Time zone: UTC+5:30 (IST)
- PIN: 202125
- Telephone code: 2780
- Vehicle registration: UP-81

Harduaganj is a town and a nagar panchayat in the Aligarh district of the Indian state of Uttar Pradesh. The town is believed to be founded by Balram Dauji (elder brother of Krishna). An ancient temple dedicated to Dauji is located in the town. Mythologically, it is believed by the residents of this town that Dauji killed a demon by using "Hal" (plough)and then washed the "Hal" at this site, thereby, giving the name to this place as "Hal-dhuwa-ganj". Later on, the name was adjusted to "Harduaganj".

The 500 MW Harduaganj Thermal Power Station is located here.

== Demographics ==
As of 2011 Indian Census, Harduaganj had a total population of 13,690, of which 7,261 were males and 6,429 were females. Population within the age group of 0 to 6 years was 1,837. The total number of literates in Harduaganj was 8,182, which constituted 59.8% of the population with male literacy of 66.4% and female literacy of 52.2%. The effective literacy rate of 7+ population of Harduaganj was 69.0%, of which male literacy rate was 76.5% and female literacy rate was 60.6%. The Scheduled Castes population was 2,105. Harduaganj had 2384 households in 2011.

== Agriculture ==
Agricultural land is extremely rich in minerals. The farmers produce wheat, maize, paddy, moong, channa, mustard, potato, vegetables, mangoes, guava, water melons, musk melons etc. The irrigation water is being supplied through a network of channels coming from Upper Ganga Canal.

The town has a wholesale grain market, wholesale vegetable market, wholesale fruit market and a large retail market for the general population

== Medical facilities ==
There is a big government hospital named after Lala Matru Mal Aggrawal who donated the land piece for the hospital. Quality medical facilities in the private sector are available.

== Educational Institutions ==
The town has many educational institutions, both Government as well as private such as Agrasen Inter College, Pt. Maujiram inter college affiliated by UP educational board, meanwhile many reputed CBSE schools are also there nearby the town.

== Religious places ==
Dauji temple, Bhuteshwar temple, Kali Mata temple and Jageshwar temple are the most famous temples of the town where a large number of devotees pay obeisance every day. An annual procession of Kali Mata along with a fair is organised in the town in which people from all faiths belonging to the town and the surrounding villages participate. A big ground, known as "Raavan wala Oosra" annually witnesses Dussehra celebrations where the effigy of Raavana is burnt on Vijaydashmi after 10 days of Ram Lila utsav. The town has Jama Masjid, Takia wali Masjid, Chhoti Masjid and a Shia Masjid where Muslims offer their prayers. One Madarsa is also located at the outskirts of the town where poor children get both religious and modern education. Shia Muslims organise annual Muharram procession through the town where people from all faiths witness the ceremonies and participate in various activities.

== Notable people ==
- Nathuram Sharma, Hindi and Urdu language poet
