= Jawan Sikandpur =

- Town & Block
- Location in Uttar Pradesh, India Jawan Sikandpur (India)
- Coordinates: 27.95°N 78.17°E
- Country: India
- State: Uttar Pradesh
- District: Aligarh

Government
  - Body: Nagar panchayat

Languages
  - Official: Hindi
- Time zone: UTC+5:30 (IST)
- PIN: 202126
- Telephone code: 248
- Lok Sabha constituency: Aligarh
- Vidhan Sabha constituency: Baruli

Jawan Sikandpur is a town in Aligarh district in the state of Uttar Pradesh.It is located at a distance of 16 km from Aligarh on Aligarh Moradabad Highway.

== Education ==
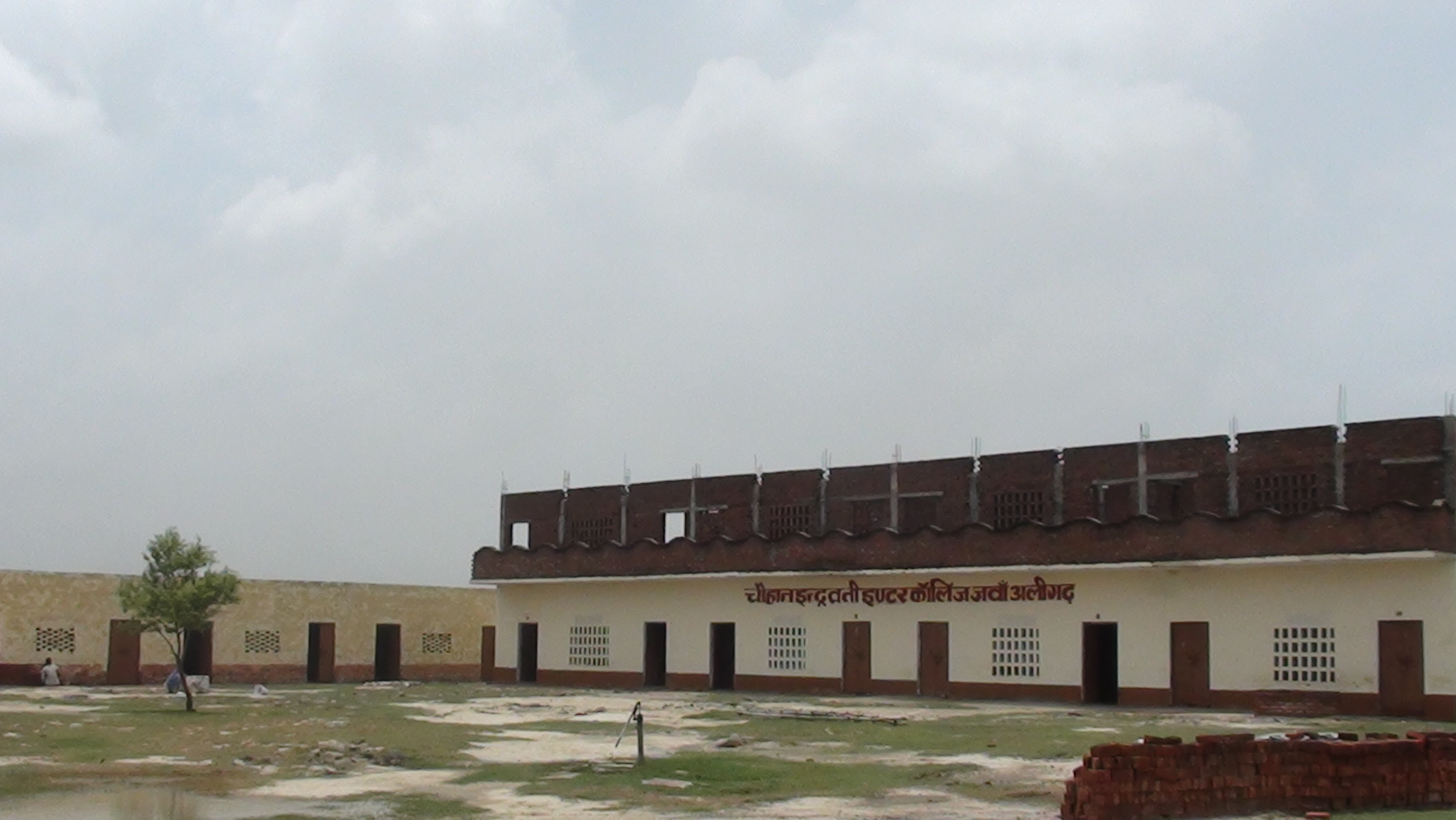
Chauhan Indravati Inter College at Jawan Sikandpur

Jawan Sikandarpur has only one college Chauhan Indravati Inter College located at the Cummunical Health Centre (CHC), Anupshahar Road.

== Notable people ==
- Nawab Singh Chauhan, member of the 6th Lok Sabha

== See also ==
- Jawan Vajidpur
- Sumera Hydroelectric Power Plant
- Kasimpur Power House
