= Moonidih =

- Neighborhood
- Location within Jharkhand Location within India
- Coordinates: 23.7390°N 86.3475°E
- Country: India
- State: Jharkhand
- District: Dhanbad
- Subdistrict: Dhanbad

Population (2011)
  - Total: 138,494
- Time zone: UTC+05:30 (IST)
- Pincode: 828129
- Website: dhanbad.nic.in

Moonidih is a neighborhood in Dhanbad CD block in Dhanbad Sadar subdivision of Dhanbad district in the Indian state of Jharkhand

== Geography ==
Cities, towns and locations in the southern portion of Dhanbad Sadar subdivision in Dhanbad district
MC: Municipal Corporation, CT: Census Town, N: Neighbourhood, R: Rural/ Urban centre
Owing to space constraints in the small map, the actual locations in a larger map may vary slightly

=== Location ===
Moonidih is located at 23.7390°N 86.3475°E.

Note: The map alongside presents some of the notable locations in the area. All places marked in the map are linked in the larger full screen map.

Moonidih was not identified as a separate place in 2011 census. In the map of Dhanbad cum Kenduadih cum Jogta CD block on page 127 of District Census Handbook Dhanbad, 2011 census, several census towns and mouzas are shown in the southern part of the CD block. It appears that Moonidih is part of a mouza, but it is not possible to identify which one. In the map placed on this page (based on geographical coordinates) Moonidh is surrounded by several census towns in Dhanbad CD block. In the map on this page Kenduadih, a neighbourhood in ward no. 12 of Dhanbad Municipal Corporation, is shown as being adjacent to Moonidih, but the latter is not mentioned in the list of wards in DMC.

=== Overview ===
The region shown in the map is a part of the undulating uplands bustling with coalmines. The Damodar River, the most important river of the Chota Nagpur Plateau, flows along the southern border. A major part of the area shown in the map is part of Dhanbad Municipal Corporation, an urban area. The places in the DMC area are marked as neighbourhoods. The western part of the region shown in the map is covered by Dhanbad (community development block). 57% of the population of Dhanbad CD block reside in rural areas and 43% reside in urban areas, The east-central part of the region shown in the map is covered by Baliapur (community development block). 86% of the population of Baliapur CD block reside in rural areas and 14% reside in urban areas. The places in the CD block areas are marked mostly as census towns. Three operational areas of BCCL operate fully within the region – Pootkee Balihari Area, Lodna Area and Eastern Jharia Area. The Moonidih sector of Western Jharia Area also operates in the region.

== Economy ==
=== Coal mines ===
The Western Jharia Area of BCCL covers two separate coal blocks- Moonidih coal block and Mahuda coal block. While Moonidih coal block is situated in west-central Jharia coalfield, Mahuda coal basin is situated on the western part of Jharia coalfield. Location wise both the blocks are separated by a few kilometres and are accessible by National Highway 18 (old number NH 32) (locally popular as Dhanbad- Bokaro national highway). The mines in the Area are: Moonidih Project, Murlidih 21/22 pits mine, Lohapatti mine and Bhatdih Mine. The Area office is located at Mahuda.

The Moonidih Project initiated in 1964 with Polish collaboration is one of the deepest underground coal mines in the country, its shafts going down to depths of 545 metres (1,788 ft) and 560 metres (1,840 ft). Since inception Moonidih was designed for high levels of production utilising longwall mechanisation, moving on to higher levels of technology in subsequent years.

The Coal Bed Methane project is in the southern part of the Moonidih block, where coal seams have occurred at depths of 1,000 metres (3,300 ft) and are still virgin. The effectively recovered methane gas is utilised at Moonidih for generating electricity.

=== Washery ===
Moonidih coking coal washery of BCCL was commissioned in 1983 and has an operable capacity of 1.60 million tonnes per year.

== Transport ==
Trekkers and mini buses and state buses are available, which connect Moonidih to Jharia, Dhanbad and other places. Public transport buses are few.

The nearest railway station to Moonidih is 8 km away at Mahuda. A branch line for transportation of goods connects Moonidih coal mine and coal washery to Mahuda railway junction. Monnidih is 8 km from Jharia, 10 km from Dhanbad, other nearby villages and mines are at Lodna (6.4 km), Putki (2.5 km), Jamadoba (6.2 km). The Damodar River flows near Moonidih village.

== Education ==
D.A.V. Public School (Moonidih Project), Indian School of Learning, Baludih Public School, Jatudih, are the schools which caters the need of children of villages and staff working in coal mines and washery.

D.A.V. Public School (Moonidih Project) is the largest school in Moonidih on the basis of both, number of students studying and infrastructure.
