= Nagri Kalan =

- Census Town
- Location in Jharkhand, India Nagri Kalan (India)
- Coordinates: 23°49′3″N 86°20′44″E
- Country: India
- State: Jharkhand
- District: Dhanbad
- CD block: Baghmara

Area
  - Total: 5.05 km^{2} (1.95 sq mi)

Population (2011)
  - Total: 9,410
  - Density: 1,860/km^{2} (4,830/sq mi)

Languages
  - Official: Hindi, Urdu
- Time zone: UTC+5:30 (IST)
- Vehicle registration: JH
- Lok Sabha constituency: Giridih
- Vidhan Sabha constituency: Baghmara
- Website: dhanbad.nic.in

Nagri Kalan is a census town in Baghmara CD block in Dhanbad Sadar subdivision of Dhanbad district in the Indian state of Jharkhand.

== Geography ==
Cities, towns and locations in the western portion of Dhanbad Sadar subdivision in Dhanbad district
MC: Municipal Corporation, CT: Census Town, N: Neighbourhood, R: Rural/ Urban centre
Owing to space constraints in the small map, the actual locations in a larger map may vary slightly

=== Location ===
Nagri Kalan is located at 23°49′3″N 86°20′44″E.

Note: The map alongside presents some of the notable locations in the area. All places marked in the map are linked in the larger full screen map.

=== Overview ===
The region shown in the map is a part of the undulating uplands bustling with coalmines. The Damodar River, the most important river of the Chota Nagpur Plateau, flows along the southern border. The area beyond the Damodar was once a part of Dhanbad district but was transferred to Bokaro district in 2001. Bulk of the area shown in the map is part of Baghmara (community development block). In Baghmara CD block 67% of the population lives in rural areas and 33% in urban areas. The block has 18 census towns, all marked in the map, except Rajganj, which is shown in the map for the northern portion of the district. A portion of Dhanbad Municipal Corporation extends into the region till around Katras. The places in the DMC area are marked as neighbourhoods. Most of the DMC area is shown in the maps for the central and southern portions of the district. Four operational areas of BCCL operate fully within the region – Katras Area, Govindpur Area, Barora Area and Block II Area. The Mahuda sector of Western Jharia Area also operates in the region.

== Demographics ==
As per the 2011 Census of India, Nagri Kalan had a total population of 9,410 of which 4,942 (53%) were males and 4,468 (47%) were females. Population below 6 years was 1,257. The total number of literates in Nagri Kalan was 6,324 (77.57% of the population over 6 years).

As of 2001 India census, Nagri Kalan had a population of 7,693. Males constitute 54% of the population and females 46%. Nagri Kalan has an average literacy rate of 59%, lower than the national average of 59.5%: male literacy is 70%, and female literacy is 46%. In Nagri Kalan, 16% of the population is under 6 years of age.

== Infrastructure ==
Nagri Kalan has an area of 5.05 km^{2}. It is 18 km from the district headquarters Dhanbad. There is a railway station at Tetulmari 0.5 km away. Buses are available in the town. It has 18 km roads and both closed and open drains. The two major sources of protected water supply are tap water from treated sources and uncovered wells. There are 1,542 domestic electric connections and 5 road light points. Amongst the educational facilities, it has 2 primary schools, 3 middle schools and 1 secondary school. Senior secondary school and general degree college is available at Katras 6 km away. Amongst the recreational and cultural facilities, it has a public library and a reading room. It has branches of 1 nationalised bank, 1 agricultural credit society and 1 non-agricultural credit society.
