= Babua Kalan =

Babua Kalan Baua Kalan
- Census Town
- Location in Jharkhand, India Babua Kalan (India)
- Coordinates: 23.814°N 86.365°E
- Country: India
- State: Jharkhand
- District: Dhanbad
- CD block: Baghmara

Area
  - Total: 6.22 km^{2} (2.40 sq mi)

Population (2011)
  - Total: 9,489
  - Density: 1,530/km^{2} (3,950/sq mi)

Languages
  - Official: Hindi, Urdu
- Time zone: UTC+5:30 (IST)
- Vehicle registration: JH
- Lok Sabha constituency: Giridih
- Vidhan Sabha constituency: Baghmara
- Website: dhanbad.nic.in

Babua Kalan (also called Baua Kalan) is a census town in Baghmara CD Block in Dhanbad Sadar subdivision of Dhanbad district in the state of Jharkhand, India.

== Geography ==
Cities, towns and locations in the western portion of Dhanbad Sadar subdivision in Dhanbad district
MC: Municipal Corporation, CT: Census Town, N: Neighbourhood, R: Rural/ Urban centre
Owing to space constraints in the small map, the actual locations in a larger map may vary slightly

=== Location ===
Babua Kalan is located at 23.814°N 86.365°E.

Note: The map alongside presents some of the notable locations in the area. All places marked in the map are linked in the larger full screen map.

=== Overview ===
The region shown in the map is a part of the undulating uplands bustling with coalmines. The Damodar River, the most important river of the Chota Nagpur Plateau, flows along the southern border. The area beyond the Damodar was once a part of Dhanbad district but was transferred to Bokaro district in 2001. Bulk of the area shown in the map is part of Baghmara (community development block). In Baghmara CD block 67% of the population lives in rural areas and 33% in urban areas. The block has 18 census towns, all marked in the map, except Rajganj, which is shown in the map for the northern portion of the district. A portion of Dhanbad Municipal Corporation extends into the region till around Katras. The places in the DMC area are marked as neighbourhoods. Most of the DMC area is shown in the maps for the central and southern portions of the district. Four operational areas of BCCL operate fully within the region – Katras Area, Govindpur Area, Barora Area and Block II Area. The Mahuda sector of Western Jharia Area also operates in the region.

== Demographics ==
As per the 2011 Census of India, Baua Kalan had a total population of 9,489 of which 5,019 (53%) were males and 4,470 (47%) were females. Population below 6 years was 1,253. The total number of literates in Baua Kalan was 5,144 (62.46% of the population over 6 years).

As of 2001 India census, Babua Kalan had a population of 8,829. Males constitute 55% of the population and females 45%. Babua Kalan has an average literacy rate of 50%, lower than the national average of 59.5%; with 66% of the males and 34% of females literate. 17% of the population is under 6 years of age.

== Infrastructure ==
Baua Kalan has an area of 6.22 km^{2}. It is 32 km from the district headquarters Dhanbad. There is a railway station at Tetulmari 2 km away. Buses are available in the town. It has 22 km roads and open drains. The two major sources of protected water supply are hand pumps and uncovered wells. There are 1,673 domestic electric connections and 8 road light points. Amongst the educational facilities, it has 2 primary schools, 4 middle schools and 2 secondary schools. The nearest senior secondary school is at Bhuli 2 km away. Amongst the recreational and cultural facilities, it has an auditorium/ community hall. It has branches of 2 agricultural credit societies and 7 non-agricultural credit societies.
