= Mahuda =

- Census Town
- Location in Jharkhand, India Mahuda (India)
- Coordinates: 23.75°N 86.27°E
- Country: India
- State: Jharkhand
- District: Dhanbad

Area
  - Total: 2.56 km^{2} (0.99 sq mi)

Population (2011)
  - Total: 5,196
  - Density: 2,030/km^{2} (5,260/sq mi)

Languages
  - Official: Hindi, Urdu
- Time zone: UTC+5:30 (IST)
- PIN: 828305 (Mahuda)
- Telephone/ STD code: 0326
- Website: dhanbad.nic.in

Mahuda is a census town in Baghmara CD block in Dhanbad Sadar subdivision of Dhanbad district in the Indian state of Jharkhand.

== Geography ==
Cities, towns and locations in the western portion of Dhanbad Sadar subdivision in Dhanbad district
MC: Municipal Corporation, CT: Census Town, N: Neighbourhood, R: Rural/ Urban centre
Owing to space constraints in the small map, the actual locations in a larger map may vary slightly

=== Location ===
Mahuda is located at 23.75°N 86.27°E.

Note: The map alongside presents some of the notable locations in the area. All places marked in the map are linked in the larger full screen map.

=== Overview ===
The region shown in the map is a part of the undulating uplands bustling with coalmines. The Damodar River, the most important river of the Chota Nagpur Plateau, flows along the southern border. The area beyond the Damodar was once a part of Dhanbad district but was transferred to Bokaro district in 2001. Bulk of the area shown in the map is part of Baghmara (community development block). In Baghmara CD block 67% of the population lives in rural areas and 33% in urban areas. The block has 18 census towns, all marked in the map, except Rajganj, which is shown in the map for the northern portion of the district. A portion of Dhanbad Municipal Corporation extends into the region till around Katras. The places in the DMC area are marked as neighbourhoods. Most of the DMC area is shown in the maps for the central and southern portions of the district. Four operational areas of BCCL operate fully within the region – Katras Area, Govindpur Area, Barora Area and Block II Area. The Mahuda sector of Western Jharia Area also operates in the region.

=== Police station ===
Mahuda police station serves Baghmara CD Block.

== Demographics ==
As per the 2011 Census of India, Mahuda had a total population of 5,196 of which 2,813 (54%) were males and 2,383 (46%) were females. Population below 6 years was 643. The total number of literates in Mahuda was 3,628 (79.68% of the population over 6 years).

== Infrastructure ==
Mahuda has an area of 2.56 km^{2}. It is 27 km from the district headquarters Dhanbad. There is a railway station at Mahuda. Buses are available in the town. It has 8 km roads and open drains. The two major sources of protected water supply are tap water from both treated and untreated sources. There are 980 domestic electric connections and 15 road lighting points. Amongst the educational facilities, it has 1 primary school and 1 middle school. There is a secondary school at Phulwartanr 17 km away. There is a senior secondary school at Bansjora 17 km away. The nearest general degree college is at Dhanbad.

== Economy ==
The Western Jharia Area of BCCL covers two separate coal blocks- Moonidih coal block and Mahuda coal block. While Moonidih coal block is situated in west-central Jharia coalfield, Mahuda coal basin is situated on the western part of Jharia coalfield. Location wise both the blocks are separated by a few kilometres and are accessible by National Highway 18 (old number NH 32) (locally popular as Dhanbad- Bokaro national highway). The mines in the Area are: Moonidih Project, Murlidih 21/22 pits mine, Lohapatti mine and Bhatdih Mine. The Area office is located at Mahuda.

Mahuda coking coal washery of BCCL was commissioned in 1990 and has an operable capacity of 0.63 million tonnes per year.

== Transport ==
Mahuda Junction railway station is on the Adra-Gomoh branch line which passes through this block. Mahuda Junction railway station is 500m away on a left turn exactly near BCCL Area Office on Dhanbad - Bokaro Road.
