= Pondar Kanali =

- Census Town
- Location in Jharkhand, India Pondar Kanali (India)
- Coordinates: 23.77°N 86.34°E
- Country: India
- State: Jharkhand
- District: Dhanbad
- CD block: Dhanbad

Area
  - Total: 19.83 km^{2} (7.66 sq mi)

Population (2011)
  - Total: 6,611
  - Density: 333.4/km^{2} (863.5/sq mi)

Languages
  - Official: Hindi, Urdu
- Time zone: UTC+5:30 (IST)
- Vehicle registration: JH
- Website: dhanbad.nic.in

Pondar Kanali is a census town in Dhanbad CD block in Dhanbad Sadar subdivision of Dhanbad district in the Indian state of Jharkhand.

== Geography ==
Cities, towns and locations in the southern portion of Dhanbad Sadar subdivision in Dhanbad district
MC: Municipal Corporation, CT: Census Town, N: Neighbourhood, R: Rural/ Urban centre
Owing to space constraints in the small map, the actual locations in a larger map may vary slightly

=== Location ===
Pondar Kanali is located at 23.77°N 86.34°E.

Note: The map alongside presents some of the notable locations in the area. All places marked in the map are linked in the larger full screen map.

=== Overview ===
The region shown in the map is a part of the undulating uplands bustling with coalmines. The Damodar River, the most important river of the Chota Nagpur Plateau, flows along the southern border. A major part of the area shown in the map is part of Dhanbad Municipal Corporation, an urban area. The places in the DMC area are marked as neighbourhoods. The western part of the region shown in the map is covered by Dhanbad (community development block). 57% of the population of Dhanbad CD block reside in rural areas and 43% reside in urban areas, The east-central part of the region shown in the map is covered by Baliapur (community development block). 86% of the population of Baliapur CD block reside in rural areas and 14% reside in urban areas. The places in the CD block areas are marked mostly as census towns. Three operational areas of BCCL operate fully within the region – Pootkee Balihari Area, Lodna Area and Eastern Jharia Area. The Moonidih sector of Western Jharia Area also operates in the region.

== Demographics ==
As per the 2011 Census of India, Pondar Kanali had a total population of 6,611 of which 3,494 (53%) were males and 3,117 (47%) were females. Population below 6 years was 838. The total number of literates in Pondar Kanali was 4,386 (75.97% of the population over 6 years).

As of 2001 India census, Pondar Kanali had a population of 7,474. Males constitute 54% of the population and females 46%. Pondar Kanali has an average literacy rate of 59%, lower than the national average of 59.5%: male literacy is 70%, and female literacy is 47%. In Pondar Kanali, 15% of the population is under 6 years of age.

== Infrastructure ==
Pondar Kanali has an area of 19.83 km^{2}. It is 5 km from the district headquarters Dhanbad. There is a railway station loyabad in adra gomoh rail line. Buses are available at Putki 2 km away. It has 4 km roads and open drains. The two major sources of protected water supply are tap water from both treated and untreated sources. There are 1,124 domestic electric connections and 12 road light points. Amongst the educational facilities, it has 2 primary schools and 1 middle school. Secondary school and senior secondary school are available at Putki and general degree college at Dhanwar 14 km away. Amongst the recreational and cultural facilities it has an auditorium/ community hall. It has got the branches of 1 nationalised bank, 1 private commercial bank, 1 cooperative bank, 1 agricultural credit society and 1 non-agricultural credit society.

== Transport ==
Pondar Kanali is off National Highway 18 (old number NH 32) (locally popular as Dhanbad-Bokaro Road).

There is a station at loyabd nearby on the Gomoh-Adra line.
