= Dumra, Dhanbad =

Dumra
- Census Town
- Location in Jharkhand, India Dumra (India)
- Coordinates: 23.793389°N 86.213589°E
- Country: India
- State: Jharkhand
- District: Dhanbad

Area
  - Total: 2.62 km^{2} (1.01 sq mi)

Population (2011)
  - Total: 6,772
  - Density: 2,580/km^{2} (6,690/sq mi)

Languages
  - Official: Hindi, Urdu
- Time zone: UTC+5:30 (IST)
- Telephone/ STD code: 06542
- Lok Sabha constituency: Giridih
- Vidhan Sabha constituency: Baghmara
- Website: dhanbad.nic.in

Dumra is a census town in Baghmara CD block in Dhanbad Sadar subdivision of Dhanbad district in the Indian state of Jharkhand.

== Geography ==
Cities, towns and locations in the western portion of Dhanbad Sadar subdivision in Dhanbad district
MC: Municipal Corporation, CT: Census Town, N: Neighbourhood, R: Rural/ Urban centre
Owing to space constraints in the small map, the actual locations in a larger map may vary slightly

=== Location ===
Dumra is located at 23.793389°N 86.213589°E.

Note: The map alongside presents some of the notable locations in the area. All places marked in the map are linked in the larger full screen map.

=== Overview ===
The region shown in the map is a part of the undulating uplands bustling with coalmines. The Damodar River, the most important river of the Chota Nagpur Plateau, flows along the southern border. The area beyond the Damodar was once a part of Dhanbad district but was transferred to Bokaro district in 2001. Bulk of the area shown in the map is part of Baghmara (community development block). In Baghmara CD block 67% of the population lives in rural areas and 33% in urban areas. The block has 18 census towns, all marked in the map, except Rajganj, which is shown in the map for the northern portion of the district. A portion of Dhanbad Municipal Corporation extends into the region till around Katras. The places in the DMC area are marked as neighbourhoods. Most of the DMC area is shown in the maps for the central and southern portions of the district. Four operational areas of BCCL operate fully within the region – Katras Area, Govindpur Area, Barora Area and Block II Area. The Mahuda sector of Western Jharia Area also operates in the region.

== Demographics ==
As per the 2011 Census of India, Dumra had a total population of 6,772 of which 3,562 (53%) were males and 3,210 (47%) were females. Population below 6 years was 904. The total number of literates in Dumra was 4,569 (77.86% of the population over 6 years).

== Infrastructure ==
Dumra has an area of 2.62 km^{2}. It is 38 km from the district headquarters Dhanbad. The is a railway station at Khanudi nearby. Buses are available near the town. It has 15 km roads and open drains. The two major sources of protected water supply are hand pump and tap water from treated sources. There are 1,228 domestic electric connections and 2 road light points. Amongst the medical facilities it has 6 medicine shops. Amongst the educational facilities, it has 2 primary schools and 2 middle schools. Secondary school, senior secondary school and general degree college are available at Baghmara 4 km away. It has branches of 1 nationalised bank and 1 private commercial bank.

== Economy ==
The Block II Area of BCCL covers Nudkhurkee OCP, Benedih OCP and Jamunia OCP for coking coal and Block-II Project for non-coking coal. Madhuban coal washery is also under the administrative control of Block II Area. The administrative office of Block II Area is located near Dumra.

== Transport ==
Dumra is on Topchanchi-Gomoh-Phulwartanr-Dhanbad road.
