= Sahnidih =

Sinidih Sahnidih
- Census Town
- Location in Jharkhand, India Sinidih (India)
- Coordinates: 23.78°N 86.25°E
- Country: India
- State: Jharkhand
- District: Dhanbad
- CD block: Baghmara

Area
  - Total: 1.31 km^{2} (0.51 sq mi)

Population (2011)
  - Total: 6,777
  - Density: 5,170/km^{2} (13,400/sq mi)

Languages
  - Official: Hindi, Urdu
- Time zone: UTC+5:30 (IST)
- Vehicle registration: JH
- Lok Sabha constituency: Giridih
- Vidhan Sabha constituency: Baghmara
- Website: dhanbad.nic.in

Sahnidih (also called Sinidih) is a census town in Baghmara CD block in Dhanbad Sadar subdivision of Dhanbad district in the Indian state of Jharkhand.

== Geography ==
Cities, towns and locations in the western portion of Dhanbad Sadar subdivision in Dhanbad district
MC: Municipal Corporation, CT: Census Town, N: Neighbourhood, R: Rural/ Urban centre
Owing to space constraints in the small map, the actual locations in a larger map may vary slightly

=== Location ===
Sahnidih is located at 23.78°N 86.25°E

Note: The map alongside presents some of the notable locations in the area. All places marked in the map are linked in the larger full screen map.

=== Overview ===
The region shown in the map is a part of the undulating uplands bustling with coalmines. The Damodar River, the most important river of the Chota Nagpur Plateau, flows along the southern border. The area beyond the Damodar was once a part of Dhanbad district but was transferred to Bokaro district in 2001. Bulk of the area shown in the map is part of Baghmara (community development block). In Baghmara CD block 67% of the population lives in rural areas and 33% in urban areas. The block has 18 census towns, all marked in the map, except Rajganj, which is shown in the map for the northern portion of the district. A portion of Dhanbad Municipal Corporation extends into the region till around Katras. The places in the DMC area are marked as neighbourhoods. Most of the DMC area is shown in the maps for the central and southern portions of the district. Four operational areas of BCCL operate fully within the region – Katras Area, Govindpur Area, Barora Area and Block II Area. The Mahuda sector of Western Jharia Area also operates in the region.

== Demographics ==
As per the 2011 Census of India, Sahnidih had a total population of 6,777 of which 3,568 (53%) were males and 3,209 (47%) were females. Population below 6 years was 927. The total number of literates in Sahnidih was 4,578 (78.26% of the population over 6 years).

As of 2001 India census, Sinidih had a population of 5,802. Males constitute 55% of the population and females 45%. Sinidih has an average literacy rate of 61%, higher than the national average of 59.5%: male literacy is 71%, and female literacy is 49%. In Sinidih, 13% of the population is under 6 years of age.

== Infrastructure ==
Sahnidih has an area of 1.31 km^{2}. It is 26 km from the district headquarters Dhanbad. There is a railway station at Sonadih. Buses are available in the town. It has 9 km roads and both closed and open drains. The two major sources of protected water supply are tap water from both treated and untreated sources. There are 1,279 domestic electric connections and 10 road light points. Amongst the educational facilities, it has 2 primary schools and 3 middle schools. Secondary school and senior secondary school are there at Sonadih 2 km away. General degree college is available at Katras 10 km away. Amongst the recreational and cultural facilities, it has an auditorium/ community hall. It has branches of 1 nationalised bank, 1 agricultural credit society and 2 non-agricultural credit societies.
