= Bardubhi =

- Village
- Location in Jharkhand, India Bardubhi (India)
- Coordinates: 23.7272°N 86.3458°E
- Country: India
- State: Jharkhand
- District: Dhanbad
- Founded by: Thakur Andiram Singh

Government
  - Type: Democracy
  - Body: Govt. of Jharkhand

Area
  - Total: 2.19 km^{2} (0.85 sq mi)

Population (2011)
  - Total: 4,185
  - Density: 1,910/km^{2} (4,950/sq mi)

Languages
  - Official: Khortha, Hindi
- Time zone: UTC+5:30 (IST)
- PIN: 828129
- Lok Sabha constituency: Dhanbad
- Vidhan Sabha constituency: Dhanbad
- Website: dhanbad.nic.in

Bardubhi is a village in Bardubhi Panchayat in Dhanbad CD block in Dhanbad Sadar subdivision of Dhanbad district in the Jharkhand state of India. Majority is Rajput caste is in the village.

== Geography ==
Cities, towns and locations in the southern portion of Dhanbad Sadar subdivision in Dhanbad district
MC: Municipal Corporation, CT: Census Town, N: Neighbourhood, R: Rural/ Urban centre
Owing to space constraints in the small map, the actual locations in a larger map may vary slightly

=== Location ===
Bardubhi is located at 23.7272°N 86.3458°E.

Note: The map alongside presents some of the notable locations in the area. All places marked in the map are linked in the larger full screen map.

=== Overview ===
The region shown in the map is a part of the undulating uplands bustling with coalmines. The Damodar River, the most important river of the Chota Nagpur Plateau, flows along the southern border. A major part of the area shown in the map is part of Dhanbad Municipal Corporation, an urban area. The places in the DMC area are marked as neighbourhoods. The western part of the region shown in the map is covered by Dhanbad (community development block). 57% of the population of Dhanbad CD block reside in rural areas and 43% reside in urban areas, The east-central part of the region shown in the map is covered by Baliapur (community development block). 86% of the population of Baliapur CD block reside in rural areas and 14% reside in urban areas. The places in the CD block areas are marked mostly as census towns. Three operational areas of BCCL operate fully within the region – Pootkee Balihari Area, Lodna Area and Eastern Jharia Area. The Moonidih sector of Western Jharia Area also operates in the region.

== Demographics ==
As per the 2011 Census of India, Bardubhi had a total population of 4,185 of which 2,330 (56%) were males and 1,855 (44%) were females. Population below 6 years was 426 The total number of literates in Bardubhi was 3,268 (86.94% of the population over 6 years).

== Infrastructure ==
Bardubhi has an area of 2.19 km^{2}. It is 15 km from the district headquarters Dhanbad. There is a railway station at Karkendra 3 km away. Auto's are available at Baludih which is at a distance 0.1 km. Buses are available at Putki 2 km away. It has 5.5 km roads and open drains. The two major sources of protected water supply are tap water from treated sources and hand pumps, wells are also available. There are 818 domestic electric connections. Amongst the educational facilities, it has 1 primary school. There is a middle school at Moonidih 0.5 km away. Secondary school, senior secondary school and general degree college are at Dhanbad. Amongst the recreational facilities it has an auditorium/ community hall.

== Transport ==
3 wheeler Auto's are available at Baludih 0.1 km away and buses are available at Putki 2 km away. There is a station at Karkend nearby on the Gomoh-Adra line.
