= Madhuban, Dhanbad =

Madhuban
- Census Town
- Location in Jharkhand, India Madhuban (India)
- Coordinates: 23.780389°N 86.241389°E
- Country: India
- State: Jharkhand
- District: Dhanbad

Area
  - Total: 2.87 km^{2} (1.11 sq mi)

Population (2011)
  - Total: 4,316
  - Density: 1,500/km^{2} (3,890/sq mi)

Languages
  - Official: Hindi, Urdu
- Time zone: UTC+5:30 (IST)
- Telephone/ STD code: 06542
- Lok Sabha constituency: Giridih
- Vidhan Sabha constituency: Baghmara
- Website: dhanbad.nic.in

Madhuban is a census town in Baghmara CD block in Dhanbad Sadar subdivision of Dhanbad district in the Indian state of Jharkhand.

== Geography ==
Cities, towns and locations in the western portion of Dhanbad Sadar subdivision in Dhanbad district
MC: Municipal Corporation, CT: Census Town, N: Neighbourhood, R: Rural/ Urban centre
Owing to space constraints in the small map, the actual locations in a larger map may vary slightly

=== Location ===
Madhuban is located at 23.780389°N 86.241389°E.

Note: The map alongside presents some of the notable locations in the area. All places marked in the map are linked in the larger full screen map.

=== Overview ===
The region shown in the map is a part of the undulating uplands bustling with coalmines. The Damodar River, the most important river of the Chota Nagpur Plateau, flows along the southern border. The area beyond the Damodar was once a part of Dhanbad district but was transferred to Bokaro district in 2001. Bulk of the area shown in the map is part of Baghmara (community development block). In Baghmara CD block 67% of the population lives in rural areas and 33% in urban areas. The block has 18 census towns, all marked in the map, except Rajganj, which is shown in the map for the northern portion of the district. A portion of Dhanbad Municipal Corporation extends into the region till around Katras. The places in the DMC area are marked as neighbourhoods. Most of the DMC area is shown in the maps for the central and southern portions of the district. Four operational areas of BCCL operate fully within the region – Katras Area, Govindpur Area, Barora Area and Block II Area. The Mahuda sector of Western Jharia Area also operates in the region.

=== Police station ===
There is a police station at Madhuban.

== Demographics ==
As per the 2011 Census of India, Madhuban had a total population of 4,316 of which 2,278 (53%) were males and 2,038 (47%) were females. Population below 6 years was 562. The total number of literates in Madhuban was 2,911 (77.54% of the population over 6 years).

== Infrastructure ==
Madhuban has an area of 2.87 km^{2}. It is 31 km from the district headquarters Dhanbad. There is a railway station at Madhuban. Buses are available in the town. It has 3 km roads and open drains. The two major sources of protected water supply are tap water from treated sources and hand pumps. There are 771 domestic electric connections. Amongst the medical facilities it has 1 medicine shop. Amongst the educational facilities, it has 1 primary school and 1 middle school. Secondary school, senior secondary school and general degree college are available at Katras 11 km away. It has branches of 1 nationalised bank, 1 private commercial bank, 1 cooperative bank, 12 agricultural credit societies and 8 non-agricultural credit societies.

== Economy ==
The Block II Area of BCCL covers Nudkhurkee OCP, Benedih OCP and Jamunia OCP for coking coal and Block-II Project for non-coking coal. Madhuban coal washery is also under the administrative control of Block II Area. The administrative office of Block II Area is located near Dumra.

Madhuban coking coal washery of BCCL was commissioned in 1998 and has an operable capacity of 2.5 million tonnes per year.
