= Jhinghipahari =

Jhinghipahari Jhinjhipahari
- Census Town
- Location in Jharkhand, India Jhinghipahari (India)
- Coordinates: 23.814548°N 86.305668°E
- Country: India
- State: Jharkhand
- District: Dhanbad

Area
  - Total: 0.94 km^{2} (0.36 sq mi)

Population (2011)
  - Total: 4,550
  - Density: 4,800/km^{2} (13,000/sq mi)

Languages
  - Official: Hindi, Urdu
- Time zone: UTC+5:30 (IST)
- Lok Sabha constituency: Giridih
- Vidhan Sabha constituency: Baghmara
- Website: dhanbad.nic.in

Jhinghipahari (also called Jhinjhipahari) is a census town in Baghmara CD block in Dhanbad Sadar subdivision of Dhanbad district in the Indian state of Jharkhand.

== Geography ==
Cities, towns and locations in the western portion of Dhanbad Sadar subdivision in Dhanbad district
MC: Municipal Corporation, CT: Census Town, N: Neighbourhood, R: Rural/ Urban centre
Owing to space constraints in the small map, the actual locations in a larger map may vary slightly

=== Location ===
Jhinjhipahari (as spelled in Google maps) is located at 23.814548°N 86.305668°E. The map of Baghmara-cum-Katras CD Block on page 115 of District Census Handbook, Dhanbad, Series 21, Part XIIA is so jumbled up, that it is not possible to find out any place.

Note: The map alongside presents some of the notable locations in the area. All places marked in the map are linked in the larger full screen map.

=== Overview ===
The region shown in the map is a part of the undulating uplands bustling with coalmines. The Damodar River, the most important river of the Chota Nagpur Plateau, flows along the southern border. The area beyond the Damodar was once a part of Dhanbad district but was transferred to Bokaro district in 2001. Bulk of the area shown in the map is part of Baghmara (community development block). In Baghmara CD block 67% of the population lives in rural areas and 33% in urban areas. The block has 18 census towns, all marked in the map, except Rajganj, which is shown in the map for the northern portion of the district. A portion of Dhanbad Municipal Corporation extends into the region till around Katras. The places in the DMC area are marked as neighbourhoods. Most of the DMC area is shown in the maps for the central and southern portions of the district. Four operational areas of BCCL operate fully within the region – Katras Area, Govindpur Area, Barora Area and Block II Area. The Mahuda sector of Western Jharia Area also operates in the region.

== Demographics ==
As per the 2011 Census of India, Jhinghipahari (as spelled in 2011 census matters) had a total population of 4,550 of which 2,417 (53%) were males and 2,133 (47%) were females. Population below 6 years was 634. The total number of literates in Jhinghipahari was 2992 (76.40% of the population over 6 years).

== Infrastructure ==
Jhinghipahari has an area of 0.94 km^{2}. It is 15 km from the district headquarters Dhanbad. There is a railway station at Katras 7 km away. Buses are available in the town. It has 8 km roads and both covered and open drains. The two major sources of protected water supply are uncovered wells and tap water from treated sources. There are 856 domestic electric connections. Amongst the educational facilities, it has 4 primary schools. There is a middle school at Belebaid 1 km away. The nearest secondary school, senior secondary school and general degree college is at Katras.
