= Muraidih =

- Census Town
- Location in Jharkhand, India Muraidih (India)
- Coordinates: 23.812389°N 86.238589°E
- Country: India
- State: Jharkhand
- District: Dhanbad

Area
  - Total: 2.1 km^{2} (0.81 sq mi)

Population (2011)
  - Total: 6,360
  - Density: 3,000/km^{2} (7,800/sq mi)

Languages
  - Official: Hindi, Urdu
- Time zone: UTC+5:30 (IST)
- Telephone/ STD code: 06542
- Lok Sabha constituency: Giridih
- Vidhan Sabha constituency: Baghmara
- Website: dhanbad.nic.in

Muraidih is a census town in Baghmara CD block in Dhanbad Sadar subdivision of Dhanbad district in the Indian state of Jharkhand.

== Geography ==
Cities, towns and locations in the western portion of Dhanbad Sadar subdivision in Dhanbad district
MC: Municipal Corporation, CT: Census Town, N: Neighbourhood, R: Rural/ Urban centre
Owing to space constraints in the small map, the actual locations in a larger map may vary slightly

=== Location ===
Muraidih is located at 23.812389°N 86.238589°E.

Note: The map alongside presents some of the notable locations in the area. All places marked in the map are linked in the larger full screen map.

=== Overview ===
The region shown in the map is a part of the undulating uplands bustling with coalmines. The Damodar River, the most important river of the Chota Nagpur Plateau, flows along the southern border. The area beyond the Damodar was once a part of Dhanbad district but was transferred to Bokaro district in 2001. Bulk of the area shown in the map is part of Baghmara (community development block). In Baghmara CD block 67% of the population lives in rural areas and 33% in urban areas. The block has 18 census towns, all marked in the map, except Rajganj, which is shown in the map for the northern portion of the district. A portion of Dhanbad Municipal Corporation extends into the region till around Katras. The places in the DMC area are marked as neighbourhoods. Most of the DMC area is shown in the maps for the central and southern portions of the district. Three operational areas of BCCL operate fully within the region – Katras Area, Barora Area and Block II Area. The Mahuda sector of Western Jharia Area also operates in the region.

== Demographics ==
As per the 2011 Census of India, Muraidih had a total population of 6,360 of which 3,416 (54%) were males and 2,914 (46%) were females. Population below 6 years was 956. The total number of literates in Muraidih was 4,414 (81.68% of the population over 6 years).

== Infrastructure ==
Muraidih has an area of 2.1 km^{2}. It is 30 km from the district headquarters Dhanbad. There is a railway station at Khanudi 3 km away. Buses are available at Baghmara 2 km away. It has 2 km roads and open drains. The two major sources of protected water supply are tap water from treated sources and hand pumps. There are 1,122 domestic electric connections and 42 street light points. Amongst the medical facilities it has 3 medicine shops. Amongst the educational facilities, it has 2 primary schools and 1 middle school. Secondary school, senior secondary school and general degree college are available at Baghmara.

== Economy ==
Ihe Barora Area of BCCL has four mines - Muraidih Colliery, Phularitand Colliery, Damoda Colliery and Madhuband Colliery. It is located on the western end of Jharia Coalfield.

== Transport ==
Muraidih is on the Dumra-Katras Road.
