= Sansikhara =

Sanshikhara
- Census Town
- Location in Jharkhand, India Sanshikhara (India)
- Coordinates: 23.7432°N 86.3226°E
- Country: India
- State: Jharkhand
- District: Dhanbad

Area
  - Total: 0.69 km^{2} (0.27 sq mi)

Population (2011)
  - Total: 4,470
  - Density: 6,500/km^{2} (17,000/sq mi)

Languages
  - Official: Hindi, Urdu
- Time zone: UTC+5:30 (IST)
- PIN: 828129
- Lok Sabha constituency: Dhanbad
- Vidhan Sabha constituency: Dhanbad
- Website: dhanbad.nic.in

Sansikhara is a census town in Dhanbad CD block in Dhanbad Sadar subdivision of Dhanbad district in the Indian state of Jharkhand.

== Geography ==
Cities, towns and locations in the southern portion of Dhanbad Sadar subdivision in Dhanbad district
MC: Municipal Corporation, CT: Census Town, N: Neighbourhood, R: Rural/ Urban centre
Owing to space constraints in the small map, the actual locations in a larger map may vary slightly

=== Location ===
Sansikhara is located at 23.7432°N 86.3226°E. Sansikhara is not marked in Google maps. It is marked on the map of Dhanbad-cum-Kenduadih-cum-Jagta CD block on page no. 126 of District Census Handbook, Dhanbad.

Note: The map alongside presents some of the notable locations in the area. All places marked in the map are linked in the larger full screen map.

=== Overview ===
The region shown in the map is a part of the undulating uplands bustling with coalmines. The Damodar River, the most important river of the Chota Nagpur Plateau, flows along the southern border. A major part of the area shown in the map is part of Dhanbad Municipal Corporation, an urban area. The places in the DMC area are marked as neighbourhoods. The western part of the region shown in the map is covered by Dhanbad (community development block). 57% of the population of Dhanbad CD block reside in rural areas and 43% reside in urban areas, The east-central part of the region shown in the map is covered by Baliapur (community development block). 86% of the population of Baliapur CD block reside in rural areas and 14% reside in urban areas. The places in the CD block areas are marked mostly as census towns. Three operational areas of BCCL operate fully within the region – Pootkee Balihari Area, Lodna Area and Eastern Jharia Area. The Moonidih sector of Western Jharia Area also operates in the region.

== Demographics ==
As per the 2011 Census of India, Sansikhara had a total population of 4,570 of which 2,453 (54%) were males and 2,117 (46%) were females. Population below 6 years was 428 The total number of literates in Sansikhara was 3,352 (81.62% of the population over 6 years).

== Infrastructure ==
Sansikhara has an area of 0.69 km^{2}. It is 15 km from the district headquarters Dhanbad. There is a railway station at Karkendra 3 km away. Buses are available at Putki 2 km away. It has 10 km roads and open drains. The two major sources of protected water supply are tap water from both treated and untreated sources. There are 892 domestic electric connections. Amongst the medical facilities, it has 3 medicine shops. Amongst the educational facilities, it has 1 primary school, 1 middle school, 1 secondary school and 1 senior secondary school. General degree college is at Dhanbad. Amongst the recreational facilities it has a stadium. It has got the branch of 1 nationalised bank.

== Transport ==
Sansikhara is off National Highway 18 (old number NH 32) (locally popular as Dhanbad-Bokaro Road).

There is a station at Karkend nearby on the Gomoh-Adra line.

== Education ==
Baludih Public School is located at Sansikhara.
