= Aralgoria =

Aralgaria
- Census Town
- Location in Jharkhand, India Aralgaria (India)
- Coordinates: 23.7532°N 86.3626°E
- Country: India
- State: Jharkhand
- District: Dhanbad

Area
  - Total: 1.16 km^{2} (0.45 sq mi)

Population (2011)
  - Total: 4,647
  - Density: 4,010/km^{2} (10,400/sq mi)

Languages
  - Official: Hindi, Urdu
- Time zone: UTC+5:30 (IST)
- Lok Sabha constituency: Dhanbad
- Vidhan Sabha constituency: Dhanbad
- Website: dhanbad.nic.in

Aralgoria is a census town in Dhanbad CD block in Dhanbad Sadar subdivision of Dhanbad district in the Indian state of Jharkhand.

== Geography ==
Cities, towns and locations in the southern portion of Dhanbad Sadar subdivision in Dhanbad district
MC: Municipal Corporation, CT: Census Town, N: Neighbourhood, R: Rural/ Urban centre
Owing to space constraints in the small map, the actual locations in a larger map may vary slightly

=== Location ===
Aralgoria is located at 23.7532°N 86.3626°E.

Note: The map alongside presents some of the notable locations in the area. All places marked in the map are linked in the larger full screen map.

=== Overview ===
The region shown in the map is a part of the undulating uplands bustling with coalmines. The Damodar River, the most important river of the Chota Nagpur Plateau, flows along the southern border. A major part of the area shown in the map is part of Dhanbad Municipal Corporation, an urban area. The places in the DMC area are marked as neighbourhoods. The western part of the region shown in the map is covered by Dhanbad (community development block). 57% of the population of Dhanbad CD block reside in rural areas and 43% reside in urban areas, The east-central part of the region shown in the map is covered by Baliapur (community development block). 86% of the population of Baliapur CD block reside in rural areas and 14% reside in urban areas. The places in the CD block areas are marked mostly as census towns. Three operational areas of BCCL operate fully within the region – Pootkee Balihari Area, Lodna Area and Eastern Jharia Area. The Moonidih sector of Western Jharia Area also operates in the region.

== Demographics ==
As per the 2011 Census of India, Aralgoria had a total population of 4,647 of which 2,497 (54%) were males and 2,150 (46%) were females. Population below 6 years was 540 The total number of literates in Aralgoria was 3,352 (81.62% of the population over 6 years).

== Infrastructure ==
Aralgoria has an area of 1.16 km^{2}. It is 15 km from the district headquarters Dhanbad. There is a railway station at Karkendra 3 km away. Buses are available at Putki 2 km away. It has 2 km roads and open drains. The two major sources of protected water supply are tap water from treated sources and hand pumps. There are 852 domestic electric connections. Amongst the educational facilities, it has 1 primary school. Middle school, secondary school, senior secondary school are available at Putki and general degree college is at Dhanbad. It has got the branch of 1 nationalised bank.

== Economy ==
Producing mines in the Pootkee Balihari Area (PB Area in short) of BCCL are: PB Project Colliery, KB 10/12 Pits Colliery, Bhagaband Colliery and Gopalichak Colliery. Non-producing mines in the PB Area are: KB 5/6 Pits Colliery, Kenduadih Colliery and Putkee Colliery. Other units of the PB Area are: B.C.Plant, Ekra Workshop, Kenduadih Auto Workshop and 132 kv substation. The area office is located at Aralgoria.

The PB Area has about 6,000 quarters for employees.
