= Alagdiha =

- Census Town
- Location in Jharkhand, India Alagdiha (India)
- Coordinates: 23.731833°N 86.454167°E
- Country: India
- State: Jharkhand
- District: Dhanbad

Area
  - Total: 0.737 km^{2} (0.285 sq mi)

Population (2011)
  - Total: 4,609
  - Density: 6,250/km^{2} (16,200/sq mi)

Languages
  - Official: Hindi, Urdu
- Time zone: UTC+5:30 (IST)
- Lok Sabha constituency: Dhanbad
- Vidhan Sabha constituency: Sindri
- Website: dhanbad.nic.in

Alagdiha is a census town in Baliapur CD block in Dhanbad Sadar subdivision of Dhanbad district in the Indian state of Jharkhand.

== Geography ==
Cities, towns and locations in the southern portion of Dhanbad Sadar subdivision in Dhanbad district
MC: Municipal Corporation, CT: Census Town, N: Neighbourhood, R: Rural/ Urban centre
Owing to space constraints in the small map, the actual locations in a larger map may vary slightly

=== Location ===
Alagdiha is located at 23.731833°N 86.454167°E

Note: The map alongside presents some of the notable locations in the area. All places marked in the map are linked in the larger full screen map.

=== Overview ===
The region shown in the map is a part of the undulating uplands bustling with coalmines. The Damodar River, the most important river of the Chota Nagpur Plateau, flows along the southern border. A major part of the area shown in the map is part of Dhanbad Municipal Corporation, an urban area. The places in the DMC area are marked as neighbourhoods. The western part of the region shown in the map is covered by Dhanbad (community development block). 57% of the population of Dhanbad CD block reside in rural areas and 43% reside in urban areas, The east-central part of the region shown in the map is covered by Baliapur (community development block). 86% of the population of Baliapur CD block reside in rural areas and 14% reside in urban areas. The places in the CD block areas are marked mostly as census towns. Three operational areas of BCCL operate fully within the region – Pootkee Balihari Area, Lodna Area and Eastern Jharia Area. The Moonidih sector of Western Jharia Area also operates in the region.

== Demographics ==
As per the 2011 Census of India, Alagdiha had a total population of 4,609 of which 2,406 (52%) were males and 2,203 (48%) were females. Population below 6 years was 591 The total number of literates in Alagdihai was 3,212 (79.94% of the population over 6 years).

== Infrastructure ==
Alagdiha has an area of 0.737 km^{2}. It is 12 km from the district headquarters Dhanbad. There is a railway station at Raksitpur 7 km away. Buses are available in the town. It has 8 km roads and open drains. The two major sources of protected water supply are tube well/ bore hole and uncovered wells. There are 853 domestic electric connections and 4 road light points. Amongst the educational facilities, it has 1 primary school. There is a middle school at Kusmatand 5 km away, and other educational facilities at Jharia 6 km away.
