= Panrra =

- Census Town
- Location in Jharkhand, India Panrra (India)
- Coordinates: 23.7915°N 86.6965°E
- Country: India
- State: Jharkhand
- District: Dhanbad

Area
  - Total: 5.214 km^{2} (2.013 sq mi)

Population (2011)
  - Total: 9,563
  - Density: 1,834/km^{2} (4,750/sq mi)

Languages
  - Official: Hindi, Urdu
- Time zone: UTC+5:30 (IST)
- Lok Sabha constituency: Dhanbad
- Vidhan Sabha constituency: Nirsa
- Website: dhanbad.nic.in

Panrra is a census town in Nirsa CD block in Dhanbad Sadar subdivision of Dhanbad district in the Indian state of Jharkhand.

== Geography ==
Cities, towns and locations in the eastern portion of Dhanbad Sadar subdivision in Dhanbad district
M: Municipality, CT: census town, N: neighbourhood, R: Rural/ Urban centre, D: Dam, P: Power Plant
Owing to space constraints in the small map, the actual locations in a larger map may vary slightly

=== Location ===
Panrra is not marked on Google maps. The location shown is an approximation.

Note: The map alongside presents some of the notable locations in the area. All places marked in the map are linked in the larger full screen map.

=== Overview ===
The region shown in the map is a part of the undulating uplands bustling with coalmines. While the Damodar flows along the southern boundary, the Barakar flows along the eastern boundary. Both the rivers form the boundary with West Bengal. Panchet Dam and Maithon Dam, along with their reservoirs, are prominently visible in the map. The entire area is covered in Nirsa (community development block). In Nirsa CD block 69% of the population live in rural areas and 31% live in urban areas. The official website of the district has announced the formation of two new CD blocks – Egarkund and Kaliasole, possibly carved out of Nirsa CD block. As of July 2019, there is no further information about the new CD blocks. BCCL operates Chanch/ Victoria Area partially within the region shown in the map. ECL operates Mugma Area fully within the region shown in the map.

== Demographics ==
As per the 2011 Census of India, Panrra had a total population of 9,563 of which 4,998 (52%) were males and 4,575 (48%) were females. Population below 6 years was 1,417. The total number of literates in Panrra was 5,618 (68.97% of the population over 6 years).

== Infrastructure ==
Panrra has an area of 5.214 km^{2}. It is 28 km from the district headquarters Dhanbad. There is a railway station at Thapar Nagar 10 km away. Buses are available at Nirsa 3 km. It has 8 km roads and both covered and open drains. The two major sources of protected water supply are hand pump and uncovered wells. There are 1,686 domestic electric connections. Amongst the educational facilities, it has 2 primary schools, 3 middle schools and 2 secondary schools. There is a senior secondary school at Bhamal 7 km away. There is a general degree college at Maithon 15 km away.

== Education ==
Koylanchal Sanjay Gandhi Memorial (KSGM) College was established at Nirsa in 1980. Affiliated with the Binod Bihari Mahto Koylanchal University, it offers honours and pass courses in arts, science and commerce subjects.

KSSM Inter College is a coeducational residential institution at Nirsa.

SSKBC High School was established at Bhamal in 1957. It is a Hindi-medium coeducational secondary school having facilities for teaching in classes IX and X.
