= Loyabad =

Loyabad Layabad
- Neighbourhood in Dhanbad
- Location in Jharkhand, India Loyabad (India)
- Coordinates: 23.7762°N 86.3528°E
- Country: India
- State: Jharkhand
- District: Dhanbad

Government
  - Type: Representative Democracy
  - Body: Dhanbad Municipal Corporation

Area
  - Total: 15 km^{2} (5.8 sq mi)
- Elevation: 170 m (560 ft)

Population (2001)
  - Total: 32,695
  - Density: 2,200/km^{2} (5,600/sq mi)

Languages
  - Official: Hindi, Urdu
- Time zone: UTC+5:30 (IST)
- Vehicle registration: JH 10
- Website: dhanbad.nic.in

Loyabad is a neighbourhood in Dhanbad in Dhanbad Sadar subdivision of Dhanbad district in Jharkhand state, India.

== Geography ==
Cities, towns and locations in the central portion of Dhanbad Sadar subdivision in Dhanbad district
MC: Municipal Corporation, CT: Census Town, N: Neighbourhood, R: Rural/ Urban centre
Owing to space constraints in the small map, the actual locations in a larger map may vary slightly

=== Location ===
Loyabad is located at 23.7762°N 86.3528°E.

Note: The map alongside presents some of the notable locations in the area. All places marked in the map are linked in the larger full screen map.

The earlier census town was combined with other urban units to form Dhanbad Municipal Corporation in 2006.

Loyabad is part of Ward No. 8 of Dhanbad Municipal Corporation.

=== Overview ===
The region shown in the map is a part of the undulating uplands bustling with coalmines in the lowest rung of the Chota Nagpur Plateau. The entire area shown in the map is under Dhanbad Municipal Corporation, except Belgaria which is under Baliapur (community development block). The places in the DMC area are marked as neighbourhoods. The DMC area shown in the map is around the core area of Dhanbad city. Another major area of DMC is shown in the map of the southern portion of the district. A small stretch of DMC, extending up to Katras is shown in the map of the western portion. The region is fully urbanised. Jharia (community development block) has been merged into DMC. Three operational areas of BCCL operate fully within the region – Sijua Area, Kusunda Area and Bastacola Area.

=== Police station ===
There is a police station at Loyabad.

== Demographics ==
As of 2001 India census, Loyabad had a population of 32,695. Males constitute 55% of the population and females 45%. Loyabad has an average literacy rate of 58%, lower than the national average of 59.5%: male literacy is 69%, and female literacy is 44%. In Loyabad, 15% of the population is under 6 years of age.

== Economy ==
The following collieries function under the Sijua Area of BCCL: Bansdeopur, Mudidih, Kankanee, Loyabad, S/Bansjora, Nichitpur and Tetulmari.

There is no production at Loyabad underground mine, only pumping goes on.

== Transport ==
Loyabad is situated at a distance of 10 km from Dhanbad, which is a major city in the adjoining area. It is well connected by railways through Tata-Sijua route (under the Adra railway division, South Eastern Railway) as well as by road. Loyabad is also connected to Dhanbad via road, courtesy of the JNURM buses and auto-rickshaws plying along the Dhanbad-Katras route.

== Education ==
Basudev Gandhi Smriti High School (Popularly knows as BGS High School or Gandhi Maidan school) is one of the famous school of the area running by state government of Jharkhand offering education up to class 12th for the students.
