= Dumra =

Dumra may refer to:

- Dumra (surname), a Punjabi Khatri surname
- Dumra, Araria district, Bihar, India
- Dumra, Dhanbad, a census town in Baghmara, Dhanbad district, Jharkhand India
- Dumra, Sitamarhi district, Bihar, India
- MV Dumra, a British cargo vessel shipwrecked in 1943
- A region of Ladakh, better known as Nubra
- Another name for Amri language, spoken in Assam, India
- An historical name for Durbuk, Ladakh, India

== See also ==
- Dimra, a former Palestinian village
