= Chirkunda =

- City
- Location in Jharkhand, India Chirkunda (India)
- Coordinates: 23.74°N 86.80°E
- Country: India
- State: Jharkhand
- District: Dhanbad

Government
  - Type: Notified Area

Population (2011)
  - Total: 45,508

Languages
  - Official: Hindi, Urdu
- Time zone: UTC+5:30 (IST)
- PIN: 828202
- Telephone code: 06540
- Vehicle registration: JH
- Website: dhanbad.nic.in

Chirkunda is a city and a notified area in Dhanbad Sadar subdivision of Dhanbad district in the state of Jharkhand, India. It is located in the northeast of Jharkhand and lies very close to the state borders of West Bengal.

== Geography ==
Cities, towns and locations in the eastern portion of Dhanbad Sadar subdivision in Dhanbad district
M: Municipality, CT: census town, N: neighbourhood, R: Rural/ Urban centre, D: Dam, P: Power Plant
Owing to space constraints in the small map, the actual locations in a larger map may vary slightly

=== Location ===
Chirkunda is located at 23.74°N 86.80°E.

Note: The map alongside presents some of the notable locations in the area. All places marked in the map are linked in the larger full screen map.

=== Overview ===
The region shown in the map is a part of the undulating uplands bustling with coalmines. While the Damodar flows along the southern boundary, the Barakar flows along the eastern boundary. Both the rivers form the boundary with West Bengal. Panchet Dam and Maithon Dam, along with their reservoirs, are prominently visible in the map. The entire area is covered in Nirsa (community development block). In Nirsa CD block 69% of the population live in rural areas and 31% live in urban areas. The official website of the district has announced the formation of two new CD blocks – Egarkund and Kaliasole, possibly carved out of Nirsa CD block. As of July 2019, there is no further information about the new CD blocks. BCCL operates Chanch/ Victoria Area partially within the region shown in the map. ECL operates Mugma Area fully within the region shown in the map.

=== Police station ===
Chirkunda police station serves Nirsa CD Block.

== Demographics ==
As per the 2011 Census of India, Chirkunda had a total population of 45,508 of which 23,772 (52%) were males and 21,736 (48%) were females. Population below 6 years was 5,791. The total number of literates in Chirkunda was 30,839 (77.65% of the population over 6 years).

As of 2001 India census, Chirkunda had a population of 39,121. Males constitute 53% of the population and females 47%. Chirkunda has an average literacy rate of 64%, higher than the national average of 59.5%; with male literacy of 71% and female literacy of 56%. 14% of the population is under 6 years of age.

=== Languages ===
Languages spoken in Chirkunda town (2011)
1. Hindi (34.6%)
2. Bengali (24.1%)
3. Urdu (14.5%)
4. Bhojpuri (9.30%)
5. Magadhi (5.60%)
6. Khortha (2.80%)
7. Others (9.20%)

== Infrastructure ==
Chirkunda has an area of 13 km^{2}. It is 45 km from the district headquarteres Dhanbad. There is a railway station at Kumardubi 10 km away. Buses are available in the town. It has 19 km roads and open drains. The two major sources of protected water supply are tap water from treated sources and uncovered wells. There are 8,028 domestic electric connections and 180 road light points. Amongst the medical facilities it has a hospital with 8 beds and 12 medicine shops. Amongst the educational facilities, it has 9 primary schools, 6 middle schools, 9 secondary schools, 3 senior secondary schools and 2 general degree colleges. Amongst the recreational facilities, it has 1 cinema theatre and 1 auditorium/ community hall. It had the branches of 5 nationalised banks and 1 non-agricultural credit society. It is a centre of the fire bricks industry and hard coke production.

== Education ==
SHMS Inter Mahavidyalaya was established at Kumardubi in 1979. It is a private co-educational institution.

SCPRP Inter Women's College is located at Nehru Road, Taldanga, Chirkunda. BSK College, Maithon, established in 1966, is a Constituent Unit of Vinoba Bhave University, Hazaribagh. It is located on the main road.

== Transportation ==
Chirkunda is well connected to various places.

=== Bus ===
to Tata, Dhanbad, Bokaro, Purulia, Kolkata (From Barakar 1 km away), Durgapur (From Barakar 1 km away), Asansol (From Barakar 20 km away) and Burdwan (from Barakar 1 km away)

=== Train ===
Connected by Grand Chord Section of the Asansol - Mughalsarai (Eastern Railway) Nearest Station - Kumardhubi (1 km) followed by Barakar (2.5 km)

Major Express and Super Fast Train which halt at Kumardhubi are Coal Field Express, Black Diamond Express, Vananchal Express, Patliputra Express, Dhanbad–Howrah Double Decker SuperFast Express, Jammu Tawi Express, Shaktipunj Express, Maurya Express, Dumka–Ranchi Intercity Express. Passenger trains are also available.
