= Nirsa =

- Census Town
- Location in Jharkhand, India Nirsa (India)
- Coordinates: 23.7864°N 86.7046°E
- Country: India
- State: Jharkhand
- District: Dhanbad
- CD block: Nirsa

Government
  - Type: Representative democracy

Area
  - Total: 2.598 km^{2} (1.003 sq mi)
- Elevation: 139 m (456 ft)

Population (2011)
  - Total: 14,794
  - Density: 5,694/km^{2} (14,750/sq mi)

Languages
  - Official: Hindi Bengali
- Time zone: UTC+5:30 (IST)
- PIN: 828205
- Vehicle registration: JH 10
- Lok Sabha constituency: Dhanbad
- Vidhan Sabha constituency: Nirsa
- Website: dhanbad.nic.in

Nirsa is a census town in Nirsa CD block in the Dhanbad Sadar subdivision of Dhanbad district in the Indian state of Jharkhand.

== Geography ==
Cities, towns and locations in the eastern portion of Dhanbad Sadar subdivision in Dhanbad district
M: Municipality, CT: census town, N: neighbourhood, R: Rural/ Urban centre, D: Dam, P: Power Plant
Owing to space constraints in the small map, the actual locations in a larger map may vary slightly

=== Location ===
Nirsa is located at 23.78°N 86.72°E. It has an average elevation of 139 metres (456 ft).

Note: The map alongside presents some of the notable locations in the area. All places marked in the map are linked in the larger full screen map.

=== Overview ===
The region shown in the map is a part of the undulating uplands. While the Damodar flows along the southern boundary, the Barakar flows along the eastern boundary. Both the rivers form the boundary with West Bengal. Panchet Dam and Maithon Dam, along with their reservoirs, are prominently visible in the map. The entire area is covered in Nirsa (community development block). In Nirsa CD block, 69% of the population live in rural areas and 31% live in urban areas. The official website of the district has announced the formation of two new CD blocks – Egarkund and Kaliasole, possibly carved out of Nirsa CD block. As of July 2019, there is no further information about the new CD blocks. BCCL operates Chanch/Victoria Area partially within the region shown in the map. ECL operates Mugma Area fully within the region shown in the map.

=== Police station ===
Nirsa police station serves Nirsa CD Block.

=== CD block Headquarters ===
Headquarters of Nirsa CD block is at Nirsa.

== Demographics ==
As per the 2011 Census of India, Nirsa had a total population of 14,794 of which 7,752 (52%) were males and 7,042 (48%) were females. Population below 6 years was 1,882. The total number of literates in Nirsa was 10,199 (78.99% of the population over 6 years).

As of 2001 India census, Nirsa had a population of 13,903. Males constitute 54% of the population and females 46%. Nirsa has an average literacy rate of 68%, higher than the national average of 59.5%: male literacy is 76%, and female literacy is 65%. In Nirsa, 14% of the population is under 6 years of age.

=== Languages ===
Languages spoken in Nirsa Town (2011)
1. Hindi (31.0%)
2. Bengali (24.6%)
3. Urdu (17.6%)
4. Magadhi (9.49%)
5. Bhojpuri (5.88%)
6. Khortha (5.65%)
7. Others (2.75%)

== Infrastructure ==
Nirsa has an area of 2.598 km^{2}. It is 20 km from the district headquarters Dhanbad. There is a railway station at Thapar Nagar 2.5 km away. Buses are available in the town. It has 7 km roads and both covered and open drains. The two major sources of protected water supply are uncovered wells and tap water from treated sources. There are 2,414 domestic electric connections and 400 road light points. Amongst the medical facilities it has 2 hospitals with 23 beds and 4 medicine shops. Amongst the educational facilities, it has 5 primary schools, 3 middle schools, 1 secondary school, 1 senior secondary school and 1 general degree college. Amongst the recreational and cultural facilities it has 1 stadium, 1 cinema theatre and 1 auditorium/ community hall. It has the branch offices of 2 nationalised banks, 1 cooperative bank, 1 agricultural credit society and 1 non-agricultural credit society. It is a centre for hard coke production.

== Economy ==
As per ECL website telephone numbers, operational collieries in the Mugma Area of Eastern Coalfields in 2018 are: Badjna Colliery, Bermury OCP, Chapapur Colliery, Gopinathpur Colliery, Hariajam Colliery, Kumardhubi Colliery, Khoodia Colliery, Kapasara Colliery, Lakhimata Colliery, Mandman Colliery, Rajpura OCP and Shampur B. Coal mining is a major part of the local economy.

== Transport ==
Nirsa is on the National Highway 19 (old numbering NH 2)/ Grand Trunk Road.

== Education ==
Koylanchal Sanjay Gandhi Memorial (KSGM) College was established at Nirsa in 1980. Affiliated with the Binod Bihari Mahto Koylanchal University, it offers honours and pass/fail courses in arts, science and commerce subjects.

KSGM Inter College is a co-educational institution at Nirsa.

SSKBC High School was established at Bhamal in 1957. It is a Hindi-medium coeducational secondary school having facilities for teaching in classes IX and X.

== Culture ==
Nirsa Dance Utsav The Nirsa Dance Utsav is one of the largest cultural events held in Nirsa, organized by Krishna's Dance Academy in collaboration with Artwing Entertainments Private Limited. This biennial event aims to promote dance culture in the region by providing a platform for dancers from across India to showcase their talent.

The second edition, Nirsa Dance Utsav Season 2, will take place on 29th December 2024 at the Naya Danga Ground, Kali Mandir, Nirsa. The event will feature performances from dancers all over India, as well as students of Krishna's Dance Academy. The celebrity chief guest for Season 2 is Vartika Jha, a renowned dancer known for her performances in various national television shows. The event is expected to attract a large crowd, continuing the success of Nirsa Dance Utsav Season 1, which drew over 3,000 attendees in 2022 and featured Vaibhav Ghuge as the celebrity guest.

The event not only serves as an entertainment platform but also plays a key role in developing the cultural landscape of Nirsa by bringing attention to various dance styles and encouraging local talent to participate on a national stage.
