= Dhanbad Sadar subdivision =

- Subdivision
- Location in West Bengal, India Dhanbad Sadar subdivision (India)
- Coordinates: 23.7998°N 86.4305°E
- Country: India
- State: Jharkhand
- District: Dhanbad
- Headquarters: Dhanbad

Government
  - Type: Representative democracy

Area
  - Total: 2,995 km^{2} (1,156 sq mi)

Population (2011)
  - Total: 1,949,526
  - Density: 650.9/km^{2} (1,686/sq mi)

Languages
  - Official: Hindi, Urdu
- Time zone: UTC+5:30 (IST)
- Website: dhanbad.nic.in

Dhanbad Sadar subdivision is an administrative subdivision of the Dhanbad district in the state of Jharkhand, India.

== History ==
The earliest administrative mention of Dhanbad, refers to the transfer of the headquarters of Gobindapur subdivision of erstwhile Manbhum District to Dhanbaid (as it was then known) in the closing years of the 16th century. Dhanbad district was created in 1956 by carving out the old Dhanbad subdivision and Chas and Chandankiyari police station areas of the Sadar subdivision of Manbhum district, on the recommendations of the States Reorganisation Commission. Initially, the district was split into two subdivisions – Sadar and Baghmara. In 2001, Bokaro district was formed with certain areas of Dhanbad district, which formed Chas subdivision, and Bermo subdivision of Giridih district.

== Geography ==
Dhanbad Sadar subdivision has an area of 2,995 km^{2} (1,156 sq mi) and had a population of 1,949,526 in 2011.

Dhanbad Sadar subdivision, the only subdivision in the district, can broadly be divided into three natural divisions - the north and north western portions consisting of the hilly region, the uplands containing coal mines and most of the industries and the remaining uplands and plains lying to the south of the Damodar river consisting of culturable flat lands.

Dhanbad Sadar subdivision has two statutory towns namely Dhanbad and Chirkunda and 44 census towns: Hariharpur, Topchanchi, Gomoh, Gunghasa, Matigara, Bhimkanari, Nadkharki, Madhuban, Barora, Dumra, Harina, Muraidih, Rajganj, Mahlidih, Kharkhari, Sahnidih, Malkera, Nagri Kalan, Babua Kalan, Phulwartanr, Jhinghipahari, Mahuda, Gobindpur, Karmatanr, Jangalpur, Pondar Kanali, Sialgudri, Aralgoria, Sansikhara, Bardubhi, Alagdiha, Suranga, Baliapur, Bhamal, Panrra, Nirsa, Marma, Egarkunr, Siuliban, Mera, Maithon, Panchmahali, Dumarkunda and Panchet.

== Police stations ==
Police stations in Dhanbad Sadar subdivision have the following features and jurisdiction:

Police station	Area covered km^{2}	Municipal town	CD Block
Baghmara	n/a	-	Baghmara
Baliapur	n/a		Baliapur
Bankmore	n/a	Dhanbad	Dhanbad
Barora	n/a	-	Baghmara?
Barwaada	n/a	-	Govindpur
Chirkunda	n/a	Chirkunda	Nirsa
Dhaunsar	n/a	Dhanbad	Dhanbad
Gobindpur	n/a	-	Govindpur
Hariharpur	n/a	-	Topchanchi
Jogta	n/a	Dhanbad	Dhanbad
Jharia	n/a	Dhanbad	-
Jorapokhar	n/a	Dhanbad	-
Katras	n/a	Dhanbad	Baghmara
Kenduadih	n/a	-	Dhanbad
Loyabad	n/a	-	Dhanbad
Madhuban	n/a	-	Baghmara?
Mahuda	n/a	-	Baghmara
Nirsa	n/a	-	Nirsa
Pathardih	n/a	Dhanbad	-
Putki	n/a	Dhanbad	Dhanbad
Rajganj	n/a	-	Baghmara?
Saraidhela	n/a	Dhanbad	Dhanbad
Sindri	n/a	Dhanbad	-
Sudamdih	n/a	Dhanbad	-
Tetulmari	n/a	-	Baghmara
Tisra	n/a	Dhanbad	-
Topchanchi	n/a	-	Topchanchi
Tundi	n/a	-	Tundi

== Blocks ==
Community development blocks in Dhanbad Sadar subdivision are

CD block	Headquarters	Area km^{2}	Population (2011)	SC %	ST %	Hindus %	Muslims %	Literacy rate %	Census Towns
Baghmara	Baghmara	267.55	334,309	20.78	5.31	87.51	10.61	74.92	Matigara, Bhimkanari, Nadkharki, Madhuban, Barora, Dumra, Harina, Muraidih, Rajganj, Mahlidih, Kharkhari, Sahnidih, Malkera, Nagri Kalan, Baua Kalan, Phulwartanr, Jhinghipahari and Mahuda
Topchanchi	Topchanchi	194.90	163,342	11.84	6.41	76.41	20.75	74.10	Hariharpur, Topchanchi, Gomoh and Gunghasa
Tundi	Tundi	268.02	102,022	10.69	40.68	78.78	14.25	59.43	-
Purbi Tundi	Latani	127.37	50,240	10.83	44.58	74.84	8.51	61.20	-
Govindpur	Gobindpur	329.71	245,697	11.24	13.85	67.47	29.44	68.53	Gobindpur, Karmatanr and Jangalpur
Dhanbad	Dhanbad	64.20	58,884	23.62	4.91	81.59	16.64	78.47	Pondar Kanali, Sialgudri, Aralgoria, Sansikhara and Bardubhi
Baliapur	Baliapur	173.31	140,908	13.93	13.34	77.79	7.45	70.32	Alagdiha, Suranga and Baliapur
Nirsa	Nirsa	431.96	381,105	16.94	16.10	80.21	13.50	68.92	Bhamal, Panrra, Nirsa, Marma, Egarkunr, Siuliban, Mera, Maithon, Panchmahali, Dumarkunda and Panchet
Egarkund*									
Kaliasole*									

.*No information available as of June 2019

== Economy ==
=== Collieries ===
A broad area-wise distribution of coalmines of Bharat Coking Coal Limited is given below:

Operational Area	Collieries
Barora Area	Muraidih, Damoda*, Phularitand, Madhuband
Block II Area	Block II, Jamunia
Govindpur Area	New Akashkinaree, Govindpur, Block IV/ Kooridih, Jogidih, Maheshpur, Kharkhari, Dharmabandh, South Govindpur, Tettuliya
Katras Area	Salanpur, Amalgamated Angarpathra-Ramkanali, Amalgamated West Mudidih-Keshalpur, Katras Choitudih, Gaslitand
Sijua Area	Mudidih, Bansdeopur, Tentulmari, Sendra Bansjora, Kankanee, Nichitpur
Kusunda Area	Baseria, East Baseria, Gondudih Khas Kusunda, Godhar, Kusunda, Dhansar, Industry
Pootkee Balihari Area	Gopalichak, Kachi Balihari 10/12 pit, PB Project, Bhagabadh, Kenduadih, Pootkee, Kachi Balihari 5/6 pit
Bastacola Area	Bastacola, Bera, Dobari, Kuya, Ghanoodih, Kujama
Lodna Area	Lodna, North Tisra, North Tisra-South Tisra, Jealgora, Bagdigi, Joyrampur, Jeenagora, Bararee, North Tisra-South Tisra Extension (proposed).
Eastern Jharia Area	Bhowrah (North), Bhowrah (South), Sudamdih Incline, Sudamdih Shaft, Patherdih, Amlabad*
Chanch/ Victoria Area	Basantimata, Dahibari Basantimata, New Laikdih, Laikdih Deep, Chanch, Damagoria*, Begunia*, Victoria West*, Victoria*, Kalyaneswari* (proposed)
Western Jharia Area	Moonidih, Murlidih 20/21 pits, Lohapatti, Bhatdih

Note: All the linked Area pages provide relevant details of the collieries and carry maps indicating the location of the collieries

.*Except for these seven collieries, all others are located in Dhanbad Sadar subdivision

== Education ==
The following institutions of higher learning and research, including degree colleges, are located in Dhanbad Sadar subdivision:

- Indian Institute of Technology (Indian School of Mines), Dhanbad is an Institute of National Importance at Dhanbad. Started as the Indian School of Mines in 1926, it was converted to an Indian Institute of Technology in 2016.
- Central Institute of Mining and Fuel Research, a constituent laboratory of Council of Scientific & Industrial Research (CSIR), is located at Dhanbad.
- Binod Bihari Mahto Koylanchal University was established in 2017 at Dhanbad,
- Birsa Institute of Technology Sindri was established in 1949 at Sindri.
- Patliputra Medical College and Hospital was established in 1969 at Dhanbad.
- SSLNT Women's College (Shree Shree Lakshmi Narayan Trust Mahila Mahavidyalaya) was established in 1955 at Dhanbad.
- Guru Nanak College, Dhanbad was established in Dhanbad in 1970.
- P. K. Roy Memorial College was established in 1977 at Dhanbad.
- Raja Shiva Prasad College was established in 1951 at Bhagatdih, Jharia. It was shifted to Belgaria, 5 km (3.1 mi) away, in 2018, because of underground mine fire.
- Sindri College was established in 1963 at Sindri.
- Bholaram Shibal Kharkia College, Maithon was established in 1966 at Maithon.
- Ram Sahai More College was established in 1959 at Gobindpur.
- Katras College was established at Katras Bazar in 1964.
- DAV Mahila College was established in 1973 at Katras. It has a girls hostel with 50 beds,
- Koylanchal Sanjay Gandhi Memorial College was established at Nirsa in 1980.
- Baghmara College was established at Bhimkanari, PO Baghmara, in 1985.
- Rajganj Degree College was established in 1985 at Dhawachita, Rajganj.
- Coalfield College is located at Bhaga, near Jharia.
