= Dhaunsar =

Dhansar Dhansar
- Neighbourhood in Dhanbad
- Location in Jharkhand, India Dhansar (India)
- Coordinates: 23.78°N 86.41°E
- Country: India
- State: Jharkhand
- District: Dhanbad

Population (2001)
  - Total: 9,205

Languages
  - Official: Hindi, Urdu
- Time zone: UTC+5:30 (IST)
- Vehicle registration: JH-10
- Website: dhanbad.nic.in

Dhansar is a neighbourhood in Dhanbad in Dhanbad Sadar subdivision of Dhanbad district in Jharkhand state, India.

== Geography ==
Cities, towns and locations in the central portion of Dhanbad Sadar subdivision in Dhanbad district
MC: Municipal Corporation, CT: Census Town, N: Neighbourhood, R: Rural/ Urban centre
Owing to space constraints in the small map, the actual locations in a larger map may vary slightly

=== Location ===
Dhansar is located at 23.78°N 86.41°E.

Note: The map alongside presents some of the notable locations in the area. All places marked in the map are linked in the larger full screen map.

The earlier census town was combined with other urban units to form Dhanbad Municipal Corporation in 2006.

Dhaunsar is part of Ward No. 22 of Dhanbad Municipal Corporation.

=== Overview ===
The region shown in the map is a part of the undulating uplands bustling with coalmines in the lowest rung of the Chota Nagpur Plateau. The entire area shown in the map is under Dhanbad Municipal Corporation, except Belgaria which is under Baliapur (community development block). The places in the DMC area are marked as neighbourhoods. The DMC area shown in the map is around the core area of Dhanbad city. Another major area of DMC is shown in the map of the southern portion of the district. A small stretch of DMC, extending up to Katras is shown in the map of the western portion. The region is fully urbanised. Jharia (community development block) has been merged into DMC. Three operational areas of BCCL operate fully within the region – Sijua Area, Kusunda Area and Bastacola Area.

=== Police station ===
There is a police station at Dhaunsar.

== Demographics ==
As of 2001 India census, Dhaunsar had a population of 9,205. Males constitute 56% of the population and females 44%. Dhaunsar has an average literacy rate of 48%, lower than the national average of 59.5%: male literacy is 59% and, female literacy is 35%. In Dhaunsar, 17% of the population is under 6 years of age.

== Economy ==
Collieries functioning in the Kusunda Area of BCCL are: Basuriya, East Basuriya, Gondidih, Khas Kusunda, Kusunda, Industry, Godhur and Dhansar.

== Transport ==
State Highway 12 (Jharkhand), locally popular as Jharia Road, passes through Dhaunsar.

There used to be a railway station in Dhansar falls in Dhanbad-Jharia-Patherdih route. But now it's no more because that section has been dismantled in 2007 and the station is also no more.
