= Putki =

Putki Pootkee
- Neighbourhood in Dhanbad
- Location in Jharkhand, India Putki (India)
- Coordinates: 23.7595°N 86.3524°E
- Country: India
- State: Jharkhand
- District: Dhanbad

Government
  - Type: Representative Democracy
  - Body: Dhanbad Municipal Corporation

Area
  - Total: 0.27 km^{2} (0.10 sq mi)
- Elevation: 188 m (617 ft)

Population (2020)
  - Total: 3,281
  - Density: 12,000/km^{2} (31,000/sq mi)

Languages
  - Official: Hindi, Urdu
- Time zone: UTC+5:30 (IST)
- PIN: 828116
- Telephone/ STD code: 0326
- Vehicle registration: JH 10
- Website: dhanbad.nic.in

Putki is a neighbourhood in Dhanbad in Dhanbad Sadar subdivision of Dhanbad district in the Indian state of Jharkhand.

== Demographics ==
The locality Putki falls in Dhanbad district situated in Jharkhand state, with a population 3281. The male and female populations are 1735 and 1546 respectively. The size of the area is about 0.27 square kilometer.

== Geography ==
Cities, towns and locations in the southern portion of Dhanbad Sadar subdivision in Dhanbad district
MC: Municipal Corporation, CT: Census Town, N: Neighbourhood, R: Rural/ Urban centre
Owing to space constraints in the small map, the actual locations in a larger map may vary slightly

=== Location ===
Putki is located at 23.7595°N 86.3524°E.

Note: The map alongside presents some of the notable locations in the area. All places marked in the map are linked in the larger full screen map.

Putki was combined with other urban units to form Dhanbad Municipal Corporation in 2006. Putki is part of Ward No. 9 of Dhanbad Municipal Corporation.

=== Overview ===
The region shown in the map is a part of the undulating uplands bustling with coalmines. The Damodar River, the most important river of the Chota Nagpur Plateau, flows along the southern border. A major part of the area shown in the map is part of Dhanbad Municipal Corporation, an urban area. The places in the DMC area are marked as neighbourhoods. The western part of the region shown in the map is covered by Dhanbad (community development block). 57% of the population of Dhanbad CD block reside in rural areas and 43% reside in urban areas, The east-central part of the region shown in the map is covered by Baliapur (community development block). 86% of the population of Baliapur CD block reside in rural areas and 14% reside in urban areas. The places in the CD block areas are marked mostly as census towns. Three operational areas of BCCL operate fully within the region – Pootkee Balihari Area, Lodna Area and Eastern Jharia Area. The Moonidih sector of Western Jharia Area also operates in the region.

=== Police station ===
There is a police station at Putki.

== Economy ==
Producing mines in the Pootkee Balihari Area (PB Area in short) of BCCL are: PB Project Colliery, KB 10/12 Pits Colliery, Bhagaband Colliery and Gopalichak Colliery. Non-producing mines in the PB Area are: KB 5/6 Pits Colliery, Kenduadih Colliery and Putkee Colliery. Other units of the PB Area are: B.C.Plant, Ekra Workshop, Kenduadih Auto Workshop and 132 kv substation. The area office is located at Aralgoria.

The PB Area has about 6,000 quarters for employees.

== Transport ==
Putki is on National Highway 18 (old number NH 32) (locally popular as Dhanbad-Bokaro Road).

There is a station at Karkend nearby on the Gomoh-Adra line.
