= Tetulmari =

- Neighbourhood in Dhanbad
- Location in Jharkhand, India Tetulmari (India)
- Coordinates: 23.8092°N 86.3401°E
- Country: India
- State: Jharkhand
- District: Dhanbad
- Elevation: 235 m (771 ft)

Languages
  - Official: Hindi, Urdu
- Time zone: UTC+5:30 (IST)
- PIN: 828121 (Sijua)
- Telephone/ STD code: 0326
- Website: dhanbad.nic.in

Tetulmari is a neighbourhood in Dhanbad in Dhanbad Sadar subdivision of Dhanbad district in the Indian state of Jharkhand.

== Geography ==
Cities, towns and locations in the central portion of Dhanbad Sadar subdivision in Dhanbad district
MC: Municipal Corporation, CT: Census Town, N: Neighbourhood, R: Rural/ Urban centre
Owing to space constraints in the small map, the actual locations in a larger map may vary slightly

=== Location ===
Tetulmari is located at 23.8092°N 86.3401°E.

Note: The map alongside presents some of the notable locations in the area. All places marked in the map are linked in the larger full screen map.

Tetulmari was combined with other urban units to form Dhanbad Municipal Corporation in 2006. Tetulmari is part of Ward No. 6 of Dhanbad Municipal Corporation.

=== Overview ===
The region shown in the map is a part of the uplands with coalmines in the lowest rung of the Chota Nagpur Plateau. The entire area shown in the map is under Dhanbad Municipal Corporation, except Belgaria which is under Baliapur (community development block). The places in the DMC area are marked as neighbourhoods. The DMC area shown in the map is around the core area of Dhanbad city. Another major area of DMC is shown in the map of the southern portion of the district. A small stretch of DMC, extending up to Katras is shown in the map of the western portion. The region is fully urbanised. Jharia (community development block) has been merged into DMC. Three operational areas of BCCL operate fully within the region – Sijua Area, Kusunda Area and Bastacola Area.

=== Police station ===
Tetulmari police station serves Baghmara CD Block.

== Economy ==
The following collieries function under the Sijua Area of BCCL: Bansdeopur, Mudidih, Kankanee, Loyabad, S/Bansjora, Nichitpur and Tetulmari.

== Transport ==
Tetulmari is a station on the Railways in Jharia Coalfield. It has an electrified double track. About 1,600 passengers use this station daily.

== Education ==
Dhanbad St. Xavier's School was established at Tetulmari in 2000. It is an English-medium co-educational school which follows the curriculum of the CBSE. A girl committed suicide at the school because she was tortured by her teacher for wearing bindi in 2023.

Nehru Inter Mahavidyalaya was established at Tetulmari in 2005. It is an institution for girls, with facilities for teaching in classes XI and XII. The medium of instruction is Hindi, English and Urdu.
