= Jamunia River =

Location
- Country: India
- State: Jharkhand
- City: Gomoh

Physical characteristics
- Mouth: Damodar River
  - coordinates: 23°43′41″N 86°10′52″E

The Jamunia River is a tributary of the Damodar River. It flows through the Hazaribagh, Giridih, Bokaro and Dhanbad districts in the Indian state of Jharkhand.

== Course ==
The Jamunia River rises on the Hazaribagh plateau, originating from Jamunia Dam near Bishungarh. It runs near the Grand Trunk Road from around Bagodar to past Dumri and then turns towards Gomoh in the south, forms the border between Dhanbad and Bokaro districts and joins the Damodar near Jamuniatand. Jamunia Dam constructed across the river near Hazaribagh is 3.68 kms long and 17 meters high and has a gross storage capacity of 259 Million Cubic Meters (9.14 TMCft) covering a reservoir area of 175 sq km
