= National Highway 18 (India) =

National highway in India

National Highway 18
- Map of National Highway 18 in red

Route information
- Length: 594 km (369 mi)

Major junctions
- North end: NH 19 in Gobindpur, Jharkhand
- List: NH 218 in Dhanbad, Jharkhand; NH 320 in Bokaro, Jharkhand; NH 218 in Purulia, West Bengal; NH 43 in Chandil, Jharkhand; NH 118 in Jamshedpur, Jharkhand; NH 49 in Baharagora, Jharkhand
- South end: NH 16 in Balasore, Odisha

Location
- Country: India
- States: Jharkhand, West Bengal, Odisha
- Primary destinations: Jamua, Giridih Gobindpur, Dhanbad, Chas Purulia Balarampur Chandil Jamshedpur/Tatanagar Ghatshila Baharagora Jamsola Jharpokharia Bangriposi Road Baripada Balasore

Highway system
- Roads in India; Expressways; National; State; Asian
← NH 17	→ NH 118

National Highway 18 (NH 18) (combination of old NH 32, NH 33 and NH 5) is a National Highway in India. It used to originates from Gobindpur, Dhanbad and terminates at Balasore, Odisha covering 414 kilometres (257 mi) distance. It passes through Dhanbad city, Bhuli, Katrasgarh, Chas, Bokaro, Purulia, Balarampur, Jamshedpur, Ghatshila, Baharagora, Baripada and Balasore. It was earlier NH32 between Dhanbad & Baharagora & NH5 between Baharagora & Balasore. But it was changed in 2012 after reorganization of National Highway and renumbered. This highway now linked with Gobindpur - Koderma Jharkhand SH13 Road. This highway now covers 594 kilometres (369 mi) from Koderma to Chandipur near Balasore
