= Pootkee Balihari Area =

- Location in Jharkhand Pootkee Balihari Area (India)
- Location: Jharkhand, India; 23.7544°N 86.3628°E
- Products: Coking coal
- Company: Bharat Coking Coal Limited
- Website: http://www.bcclweb.in/
- Acquired: 1971-72
- Company
- Key people: Sri P S Mishra

Pootkee Balihari Area is one of the 12 operational areas of BCCL located in Dhanbad Sadar subdivision of Dhanbad district in the state of Jharkhand, India.

== Geography ==
=== Location ===
The Pootkee Balihari Area office is located at 23.7544°N 86.3628°E.

The Pootkee Balihari Area is located about 10 km to the south-east of Dhanbad Junction railway station. National Highway 18 (old number NH 32)/ (locally popular as Dhanbad-Bokaro Road) runs just north of the Area.

The map placed immediately below shows some of the collieries in the Area. However, as the collieries do not have individual pages, there are no links in the full screen map. In the map placed further down, all places marked in the map are linked in the larger full screen map.

Collieries in the Pootkee Balihari and Western Jharia Areas of BCCL
U: Underground colliery, O: Open Cast colliery, M: Mixed colliery, W: Washery, F: Facility, A: Administrative headquarters
Owing to space constraints in the small map, the actual locations in a larger map may vary slightly

== Coal mines ==
The producing mines are: P.B.Project Colliery, KB. 10/12 Pits/ Colliery, Bhagaband Colliery and Gopalichak Colliery. The non-producing mines are: KB. 5/6 Pits Colliery, Kenduadih Colliery and Pootkee Colliery. Other units are: B.C.Colliery, Ekra Workshop, Kenduadih Auto Workshop and 132 kv substation. The Pootkee Balihari has a target of producing 3 million tonnes per annum.

== Mining activity ==
Producing mines:

The new 1&2 sections of PB section and SB 5/7 pit section was amalgamated in 2005 to form PB Project Colliery. It is located in the central part of the Jharia Coalfield on the Bhaga Putkee Road and has a mineable reserve of 571.03 million tonnes.

KB 10/12 Pits colliery operates in XV and XVI seam with hydraulic sand stowing. It was earlier worked by Sethia Brothers. It is on Putkee Bhaga DB Road and has a mineable reserve of 3.501 million tonnes.

Bhagaband Colliery, located 4 km east of Putkee was started by Bird & Heigers Co. in 1932. The 17 bottom incline was closed in 2005. Now there is one depillaring panel with stowing in XV seam. It has a mineable reserve of 3.401 million tonnes.

Gopalichak Colliery was formed by amalgamation of several old mines. Depillaring with stowing is being carried out in X seam. It has a mineable reserve of 146.14 million tonnes.

Non-producing mines:

Kenduadih Colliery is an old mine, started in 1892. It was earlier worked by East India Coal Company. Working was stopped in 1992. It has a mineable reserve of 144.63 million tonnes.

Putkee Colliery stopped working, except pumping, in 2006 for shifting the existing pit landing from XII seam to X seam. It has a mineable reserve of 83.05 million tonnes.

== Mining plan ==
Cities, towns and locations in the southern portion of Dhanbad Sadar subdivision in Dhanbad district
MC: Municipal Corporation, CT: Census Town, N: Neighbourhood, R: Rural/ Urban centre
Owing to space constraints in the small map, the actual locations in a larger map may vary slightly

An overview of the proposed mining activity plan in Cluster XI, a group of 7 mines in PB Area plus Moonidih Mine (not included here), as of 2012, is as follows:

1. Gopalichak colliery is an operating open cast colliery. With a normative annual production capacity of 0.50 million tonnes per year and peak annual production capacity of 0.65 million tonnes per year, it had an expected life of more than 25 years.

2.Kachi Balihari 10/12 pit is an operating underground colliery. With a normative annual production capacity of 0.09 million tonnes per year and peak annual production capacity of 0.117 million tonnes per year, it had an expected life of 9 years.

3.PB Project is an operating underground colliery. With a normative annual production capacity of 0.8 million tonnes per year and peak annual production capacity of 1.04 million tonnes per year, it had an expected life of more than 30 years.

4.Bhagabandh colliery is an operating underground colliery. With a normative annual production capacity of 0.08 million tonnes per year and peak annual production capacity of 0.104 million tonnes per year, it had an expected life of 5 years.

5.Kenduadih colliery is an operating open cast colliery. With a normative annual production capacity of 0.20 million tonnes per year and peak annual production capacity of 0.26 million tonnes per year, it had an expected life of more than 25 years.

6.Pootkee colliery is a non-producing underground colliery.

7.Kachi Balihari 5/6 pit colliery is a non-producing underground colliery.

== Coal field fire ==
=== Overview ===
Jharia is famous for a coal field fire that has burned underground for a century. The first fire was detected in 1916. According to records, it was the Khas Jharia mines of Seth Khora Ramji, who was a pioneer of Indian coalmines, whose mines were one of the firsts to collapse in underground fire in 1930. Two of his collieries, Khas Jharia and Golden Jharia, which worked on maximum 260-foot-deep shafts, collapsed due to now infamous underground fires, in which their house and bungalow also collapsed on 8 November 1930, causing 18 feet subsidence and widespread destruction. The fire never stopped despite sincere efforts by mines department and railway authorities and in 1933 flaming crevasses lead to exodus of many residents. The 1934 Nepal–Bihar earthquake led to further spread of fire and by 1938 the authorities had declared that there is raging fire beneath the town with 42 collieries out of 133 on fire.

In 1972, more than 70 mine fires were reported in this region. As of 2007, more than 400,000 people who reside in Jharia are living on land in danger of subsidence due to the fires, and according to Satya Pratap Singh, "Jharia township is on the brink of an ecological and human disaster". The government has been criticized for a perceived lackadaisical attitude towards the safety of the people of Jharia. Heavy fumes emitted by the fires lead to severe health problems such as breathing disorders and skin diseases among the local population.

=== Fire in the PB Area ===
There are 6 fire-affected sites in Pootkee Balihari Area. Of these two have been sealed and the fire in the remaining four are under control but requires action.

== Subsidence ==
In a study conducted for the identification of subsidence prone areas it has been found that there are 75 inhabited areas sitting on coal-bearing areas in the Pootkee Balihari Area. Out of these only one site is on wholly stable ground, 65 sites are wholly on subsidence prone area and the rest are on partly stable and partly subsidence prone area.
