= Eastern Jharia Area =

- Location in Jharkhand Eastern Jharia Area (India)
- Location: Jharkhand, India; 23.6657°N 86.4468°E
- Products: Coking coal
- Company: Bharat Coking Coal Limited
- Website: http://www.bcclweb.in/
- Acquired: 1971-72

Eastern Jharia Area is one of the 12 operational areas of BCCL located in Dhanbad Sadar subdivision of Dhanbad district in the state of Jharkhand, India.

== History ==
The Jharia coalfield is the only repository of coking coal in the country. Coking coal is being mined for over a century in the Eastern Jharia Area with such mines as Bhowrah, Sudamdih and Patherdih. Geo-mining conditions in the underground mines vary from moderate to extreme. In some cases, it is so extreme that these are amongst the most difficult mines to work in the world. This has resulted in the deeper seams, with good quality prime coking coal, to remain untapped. Moreover, shallow deposits worked by primitive methods, in pre-nationalisation period, is leading to mining fire.

== Geography ==
Collieries in the Lodna and Eastern Jharia Areas of BCCL
U: Underground colliery, O: Open Cast colliery, M: Mixed colliery, W: Washery, F: Facility, A: Administrative headquarters
Owing to space constraints in the small map, the actual locations in a larger map may vary slightly

=== Location ===
The Eastern Jharia Area office is located at 23.6657°N 86.4468°E.

The map alongside shows some of the collieries in the Area. However, as the collieries do not have individual pages, there are no links in the full screen map. In the map placed further down, all places marked in the map are linked in the larger full screen map.

The Eastern Jharia Area is located in the eastern part of Jharia coalfield.

== Mining activity ==
- Bhowrah (North) colliery is an underground mine with a total reserve of 99.24444 million tonnes.
- Bhowra (South) colliery has a total reserve of 244.876 million tonnes.
- Sudamdih Incline mine has a total reserve of 3.050 million tonnes.
- Sudamdih shaft mine has a total reserve of 50.428 million tonnes.
- Patherdih colliery has a total reserve of 64.955 million tonnes.
- Amlabad Project has a total reserve of 45.940 million tonnes.

The Eastern Jharia Area has a total reserve of 508.493 million tonnes.

Steel Authority of India has Chasnala colliery in this region.

Patherdih washery with an annual capacity of 1.6 million tonnes per year was commissioned in 1964. Sudamdih washery with an annual capacity of 1.6 million tonnes per year was commissioned in 1981.

== Mining plan ==
Cities, towns and locations in the southern portion of Dhanbad Sadar subdivision in Dhanbad district
MC: Municipal Corporation, CT: Census Town, N: Neighbourhood, R: Rural/ Urban centre
Owing to space constraints in the small map, the actual locations in a larger map may vary slightly

An overview of the proposed mining activity plan in Cluster X, a group of 6 mines in the Eastern Jharia Area, as of 2013, is as follows:

1.Bhowrah North colliery, with an underground mine, has a normative production capacity of 0.11 million tonnes per year and a peak production capacity of 0.143 million tonnes per year. It had an expected life of over 30 years. It had an open cast section with a normative production capacity of 0.42 million tonnes per year, a peak production capacity of 0.546 million tonnes per year and an expected life of 4 years.

2.Bhowrah South colliery, with an underground mine, has a normative production capacity of 0.29 million tonnes per year and a peak production capacity of 0.377 million tonnes per year. It had an expected life of over 30 years. The 3 pit open cast section with a normative production capacity of 0.235 million tonnes per year, a peak production capacity of 0.305 million tonnes per year and an expected life of 4.5 years. The Chandan open cast section with a normative production capacity of 0.158 million tonnes per year, a peak production capacity of 0.205 million tonnes per year and an expected life of 2.5 years.

3.Patherdih colliery, with an underground mine, has a normative production capacity of 0.054 million tonnes per year and a peak production capacity of 0.07 million tonnes per year. It had an expected life of over 30 years. The Chandan open cast section with a normative production capacity of 0.22 million tonnes per year, a peak production capacity of 0.286 million tonnes per year and an expected life of 4 years.

4.Sudamdih Incline colliery, with an underground mine, has a normative production capacity of 0.09 million tonnes per year and a peak production capacity of 0.117 million tonnes per year. It had an expected life of over 30 years.

5.Sudamdih Shaft colliery, with an underground mine, has a normative production capacity of 0.185 million tonnes per year and a peak production capacity of 0.24 million tonnes per year. It had an expected life of over 30 years.

6.Amlabad colliery, with an underground mine, is closed for production.

== Mine fire and subsidence ==
In the Eastern Jharia Area about 17.85 hectare of surface area is affected by mining fire and subsidence. At Sudamdih and Patherdih collieries, all the quarries affected by fire and subsidence have been filled up. Most of the affected area in Bhowrah (North) colliery has also been filled up with quarry overburden.

== Healthcare ==
The Eastern Jharia Area has 3 hospitals – Jealgora Regional Hospital with 100 beds, Bhowrah Hospital with 10 beds and Sudamdih Hospital with 10 beds,
