= Lodna Area =

- Location in Jharkhand Lodna Area (India)
- Location: Jharkhand, India; 23.72011°N 86.41059°E
- Products: Coking coal
- Company: Bharat Coking Coal Limited
- Website: http://www.bcclweb.in/
- Acquired: 1971-72

Lodna Area is one of the 12 operational areas of BCCL located in Dhanbad Sadar subdivision of Dhanbad district in the state of Jharkhand, India.

== History ==
The Bhowra Area was earlier merged with Lodna Area.

== Geography ==
Collieries in the Lodna and Eastern Jharia Areas of BCCL
U: Underground colliery, O: Open Cast colliery, M: Mixed colliery, W: Washery, F: Facility, A: Administrative headquarters
Owing to space constraints in the small map, the actual locations in a larger map may vary slightly

=== Location ===
The Lodna Area office is located at 23.72011°N 86.41059°E. The Lodna Area is situated in the central area of Jharia coalfield and is 15 km south of Dhanbad Junction railway station. The Dhanbad-Sindri Road passes through the Area.

The map alongside shows some of the collieries in the Area. However, as the collieries do not have individual pages, there are no links in the full screen map. In the map placed further down, all places marked in the map are linked in the larger full screen map.

== Mining activity ==
- Lodna colliery is an underground mine, having a mineable reserve of 8.276 million tonnes of cooking coal and 98.219 tonnes of non-cooking coal.
- Bagdigi colliery is an underground mine having a mineable reserve of 12.290 million tonnes of cooking coal and 95.981 tonnes of non-cooking coal.
- Joyrampur colliery is an underground mine having a mineable reserve of 0.520 million tonnes of cooking coal and 81.878 tonnes of non-cooking coal.
- North Tisra colliery is an underground mine having a mineable reserve of 4.12 million tonnes of coking coal and 114.067 tonnes of non-cooking coal. It also has an open cast mine worked in combination with South Tisra open cast mine
- Bararee colliery is an underground mine having a mineable reserve of 7.047 million tonnes of coking coal and 24.647 tonnes of non-cooking coal.
- South Tisra colliery is an open cast mine worked in combination with North Tisra open cast mine. It has a mineable reserve of 1.650 million tonnes of cooking coal and 42.631 tonnes of non-cooking coal.
- Jeenagora colliery is an open cast mine having a mineable reserve of 0.697 million tonnes of coking coal and 112.379 tonnes of non-cooking coal.
- Jealgora colliery is a closed underground mine where dewatering is done from the surface.

Apart from the collieries of BCCL, there also are other collieries in the region:

- Tata Steel has Jamadoba, Digwadih and 6&7 pits collieries of the Jamadoba Group in this region.
- Steel Authority of India has Jitpur colliery in this region.

== Mining plan ==
Cities, towns and locations in the southern portion of Dhanbad Sadar subdivision in Dhanbad district
MC: Municipal Corporation, CT: Census Town, N: Neighbourhood, R: Rural/ Urban centre
Owing to space constraints in the small map, the actual locations in a larger map may vary slightly

An overview of the proposed mining activity plan in Cluster IX, a group of 9 mines in the Lodna Area, as of 2012, is as follows:

1. Lodna colliery, with an underground mine, has a normative production capacity of 0.115 million tonnes per year and a peak production capacity of 0.150 million tonnes per year. It had an expected life of 30 years.

2. North Tisra colliery, with an underground mine, has a normative production capacity of 0.15 million tonnes per year and a peak production capacity of 0.195 million tonnes per year. It had an expected life of 30 years.

3. North Tisra-South Tisra colliery, with an open cast mine, has a normative production capacity of 1.65 million tonnes per year and a peak production capacity of 2.145 million tonnes per year. It had an expected life of 26 years.

4. Jealgora colliery is a closed mine.

5. Bagdigi colliery, with an underground mine, has a normative production capacity of 0.11 million tonnes per year and a peak production capacity of 0.143 million tonnes per year. It had an expected life of 30 years.

6. Joyrampur colliery, with an underground mine, has a normative production capacity of 0.153 million tonnes per year and a peak production capacity of 0.199 million tonnes per year. It had an expected life of 30 years.

7. Jeenagora colliery, with an open cast mine, has a normative production capacity of 0.7 million tonnes per year and a peak production capacity of 0.91 million tonnes per year. It had an expected life of 5 years.

8. Bararee colliery, with an underground mine, has a normative production capacity of 0.17 million tonnes per year and a peak production capacity of 0.221 million tonnes per year. It had an expected life of 30 years.

9. North Tisra-South Tisra expansion open cast mine was a proposed colliery (in 2012) with a normative production capacity of 6 million tonnes per year and a peak production capacity of 7.8 million tonnes per year. It had an expected life of 30 years. The production from NT-ST OCP, Jeenagora OCP and 6 No. incline of North Tisra UG colliery was planned to be closed/ merged/ dovetailed into the proposed opencast.
