= Govindpur Area =

- Location in Jharkhand Govindpur Area (India)
- Location: Jharkhand, India; 23.8012°N 86.2766°E
- Products: Coking coal
- Company: Bharat Coking Coal Limited
- Website: http://www.bcclweb.in/
- Acquired: 1971-72

Govindpur Area is one of the 12 operational areas of BCCL located in Dhanbad Sadar subdivision of Dhanbad district in the state of Jharkhand, India.

== History ==
“Mining in Jharia coalfield was started 150 years back and most of the mines were open cast with manual excavations. Gradually underground mines were started at shallow depth and the mining was done by the private mine operators. Due to complex geo-mining conditions, the private mine operators abandoned the mines without taking care of the safety, conservation of the post mining situations. The unscientific mining has created many small surface craters or unsafe goaf in the Jharia coalfield area. After nationalization, Coal India has taken efforts for reorganization of mines and scientific extraction of the coal through the old and existing mines.”

== Geography ==
Collieries in the Govindpur Area of BCCL
U: Underground colliery, O: Open Cast colliery, M: Mixed colliery, W: Washery, F: Facilities, A: Administrative headquarters
Owing to space constraints in the small map, the actual locations in a larger map may vary slightly

=== Location ===
The Govindpur Area office is located at 23.8012°N 86.2766°E. The Govindpur Area is located about 25 km from Dhanbad Junction railway station.

The map alongside shows some of the collieries in the Area. However, as the collieries do not have individual pages, there are no links in the full screen map.

== Formation ==
The Govindpur Area was formed with the take over of 31 collieries from the private sector – East Dharmabandh, East Khas Baihardih, East Sinidih, Jogidih, Katras New, Khas Baihardih, New Dharmabandh, Khas Mehtadih & Selected Jamunatand, Khas Sinidih, Kharkhari, Majhlitand, Maheshpur, Narainpur, New Govindpur, New Katras, New Sinidih, New Tentuliya, Akashkinaree, North Dharmabandh, North Sinidih, North Tentuliya, North Tundu Khas, Pure Sinidih, Pure Sudriadih, Sinidih, Tundu Khas, West Jogidih, West Koiludih, West Katras, West Govindpur and West Maheshpur.

== Coal mines ==
The Govindpur Area has the following collieries: New Akashkinaree colliery, Govindpur colliery, Block IV/ Kooridih colliery, Jogidih colliery, Maheshpur colliery, Kharkharee colliery, Dharmabandh colliery, South Govindpur colliery and Tettuliya colliery.

== Mining plan ==
An overview of the proposed mining activity plan in Cluster III, a group of 7 mines in Govindpur Area, as of 2012, is as follows:

Cities, towns and locations in the western portion of Dhanbad Sadar subdivision in Dhanbad district
MC: Municipal Corporation, CT: Census Town, N: Neighbourhood, R: Rural/ Urban centre
Owing to space constraints in the small map, the actual locations in a larger map may vary slightly

1.Jogidih colliery is an operating underground mine. With a normative annual production capacity of 0.244 million tonnes per year and peak annual production capacity of 0.251 million tonnes per year, it had an expected life of 30 years.

2.Maheshpur colliery is an operating underground mine. With a normative annual production capacity of 0.070 million tonnes per year and peak annual production capacity of 0.072 million tonnes per year, it had an expected life of 30 years.

3. South Govindpur colliery is a closed underground mine.

4.Teturiya colliery is a closed underground mine.

5. Govindpur colliery is an operating underground mine. With a normative annual production capacity of 0.140 million tonnes per year and peak annual production capacity of 0.144 million tonnes per year, it had an expected life of 30 years.

6.New Akashkinaree is an operating mixed mine with both underground and open cast. With a normative annual production capacity of 0.135 million tonnes per year and peak annual production capacity of 1.4 million tonnes per year, the underground mine had an expected life of 30 years. The open cast mine had a life expectancy of 11 years.

7.Block IV/ Kooridih is an operating mixed mine with both underground and open cast. With a normative annual production capacity of 0.080 million tonnes per year and peak annual production capacity of 1.3 million tonnes per year, the underground mine had an expected life of 30 years. The open cast mine had a life expectancy of 11 years.

An overview of the proposed mining activity plan in Cluster XV, a group of 4 mines including 2 in Govindpur Area, as of 2012, is as follows:

1.Kharkhari colliery is an operating underground mine. With a normative annual production capacity of 0.092 million tonnes per year and peak annual production capacity of 0.12 million tonnes per year, it has an expected life of over 30 years.

2.Dharmabandh colliery is a closed underground mine.
