= Katras Area =

- Location in Jharkhand Katras Area (India)
- Location: Jharkhand, India; 23.7962°N 86.3285°E
- Products: Coking coal
- Company: Bharat Coking Coal Limited
- Website: http://www.bcclweb.in/
- Acquired: 1971-72

Katras Area is one of the 12 operational areas of BCCL located in Dhanbad Sadar subdivision of Dhanbad district in the state of Jharkhand, India.

== History ==
Jharia coalfield first came into the picture in the 19th century. Mining in the early days was carried out through manual and semi-manual methods, causing large scale degradation of land, forests and environment, and resulting in mine fires and subsidence. In 1972, the mines of Jharia coalfield were taken over by BCCL from the erstwhile private owners and were reorganised.

== Geography ==
Collieries in the Katras and Sijua Areas of BCCL
U: Underground colliery, O: Open Cast colliery, M: Mixed colliery, W: Washery, S: F: Facility, A: Administrative headquarters
Owing to space constraints in the small map, the actual locations in a larger map may vary slightly

=== Location ===
The Katras Area office is located at 23.7962°N 86.3285°E.

The map alongside shows some of the collieries in the Area. However, as the collieries do not have individual pages, there are no links in the full screen map.

The Katras Area is located in the northern part of Jharia coalfield. National Highway 18 (old number NH 32) / (locally popular as Dhanbad-Bokaro Highway) runs 3 km to the south of the Area. National Highway 19 (old number NH 2)/ Grand Trunk Road runs 6.5 km north of the Area.

== Mining activity ==
- Salanpur colliery is a departmentally operated mixed mine having both underground and open cast mines. It has a mineable reserve of 16.310 million tonnes.
- Amalgamated Angarpathra-Ramkanali colliery is a departmentally operated underground mine. It has a mineable reserve of 64.384 million tonnes.
- Amalgamated West Mudidih-Keshalpur colliery is a departmentally operated mixed mine having both underground and open cast mines. It has a mineable reserve of 40.987 million tonnes.
- Katras Choitudih colliery is a departmentally operated underground mine. It has a mineable reserve of 67.700 million tonnes.
- Chandore, Kantapahari and Gaslitand are hired patches.

== Mining plan ==
An overview of the proposed mining activity plan in Cluster IV, a group of 5 mines in the Katras Area, as of 2012, is as follows:

Cities, towns and locations in the western portion of Dhanbad Sadar subdivision in Dhanbad district
MC: Municipal Corporation, CT: Census Town, N: Neighbourhood, R: Rural/ Urban centre
Owing to space constraints in the small map, the actual locations in a larger map may vary slightly

1. Salanpur colliery is an operating underground mine. With a normative annual production capacity of 0.15 million tonnes per year and peak annual production capacity of 0.195 million tonnes per year, it had an expected life of over 30 years.

2. Katras Choitudih colliery is an operating underground mine. With a normative annual production capacity of 0.22 million tonnes per year and peak annual production capacity of 0.286 million tonnes per year, it had an expected life of over 30 years.

3.Amalgamated Keshalpur and West Mudidih colliery is an operating mine with both an underground and an opencast mine. The opencast mine has a normative annual production capacity of 2.0 million tonnes per year and peak annual production capacity of 2.6 million tonnes per year. The underground mine has a normative annual production capacity of 0.19 million tonnes per year and peak annual production capacity of 0.247 million tonnes per year. It had an expected life of over 30 years.

4. Amalgamated Angarpathra and Ramkanali colliery is an operating underground mine. With a normative annual production capacity of 0.291 million tonnes per year and peak annual production capacity of 0.378 million tonnes per year, it had an expected life of over 30 years.

5.Gaslitand colliery is a closed underground mine.

== Fire ==
180,000 m^{2} of Gaslitand colliery, 280,000 m^{2} of Katras Choitudih Colliery and 280,000 m^{2} of Chandore patch in Amalgamated Keshalpur and West Mudidih colliery are affected by mining fire.
