= Barora Area =

- Location in Jharkhand Barora Area (India)

Location
- Location: Jharkhand, India; 23.794689°N 86.214789°E

Production
- Products: Coking coal

Owner
- Company: Bharat Coking Coal Limited
- Website: http://www.bcclweb.in/
- Acquired: 1971-72

Barora Area is one of the 12 operational areas of BCCL located in Dhanbad Sadar subdivision of Dhanbad district in the state of Jharkhand, India.

== Geography ==
Collieries in the Barora and Block II Areas of BCCL
U: Underground colliery, O: Open Cast colliery, M: Mixed colliery, F: Facility, A: Administrative headquarters
Owing to space constraints in the small map, the actual locations in a larger map may vary slightly

=== Location ===
The Barora Area office is located at 23.794689°N 86.214789°E. The Barora Area is at the western end of Jharia coalfield.

The map alongside shows some of the collieries in the Area. However, as the collieries do not have individual pages, there are no links in the full screen map.

== Mining activity ==
- Muraidih colliery is a mixed mine having both underground and open cast mines. The colliery has an open cast section with hired arrangements for extraction of overburden and transportation of coal. Shatabdi OCP was carved out of Muraidih colliery in 2000 and later amalgamated with Muraidih colliery in 2014. A private company was used for operating underground mine in seam I & III using continuous miner. It has a reserve of 115 million tonnes.
- Damoda colliery is the only functional colliery of BCCL located in Bokaro district. It has two underground mines – one pit and one incline, and two open cast mines – one departmental and one operated with hired equipment. It has a reserve of 17.8 million tonnes.
- Phularitand colliery is a mixed mine with both underground and open cast mines. Earlier, the underground mine was out of operation but from 2014 two inclines have started producing. It has a reserve of 116.06 million tonnes.
- Madhuband colliery is an underground mine with a reserve of 286.6 million tonnes.

== Mining plan ==
An overview of the proposed mining activity plan in Cluster I, Cluster II and Cluster XV as of 2012, is as follows:

Cities, towns and locations in the western portion of Dhanbad Sadar subdivision in Dhanbad district
MC: Municipal Corporation, CT: Census Town, N: Neighbourhood, R: Rural/ Urban centre
Owing to space constraints in the small map, the actual locations in a larger map may vary slightly

1.Muraidih colliery, consisting of both underground and open cast mines, has a normative production capacity of 5.50 million tonnes per year and a peak production capacity of 7.15 million tonnes per year. Shatabdi open cast project has a normative production capacity of 1.4 million tonnes per year and a peak production capacity of 1.82 million tonnes per year.

2. Damoda colliery has three units – Albion section, underground mine and BJ section (proposed open cast mine). The Albion section has a normative production capacity of 0.20 million tonnes per year and a peak production capacity of 0.26 million tonnes per year. The underground mine has a normative production capacity of 0.10 million tonnes per year and a peak production capacity of 0.13 million tonnes per year. The BJ section has a normative production capacity of 0.60 million tonnes per year and a peak production capacity of 0.78 million tonnes per year.

3. Phularitand open cast mine has a normative production capacity of 3 million tonnes per year and a peak production capacity of 3.90 million tonnes per year. It had an expected life of over 18 years. Phularitand underground mine has a normative production capacity of 0.120 million tonnes per year and a peak production capacity of 0.156 million tonnes per year. It had an expected life of over 30 years.

4. Madhuband colliery with an underground mine has a normative production capacity of 0.113 million tonnes per year and a peak production capacity of 0.147 million tonnes per year. It had an expected life of over 30 years.
