= Block II Area =

- Location in Jharkhand Block II Area (India)

Location
- Location: Jharkhand, India; 23.7893°N 86.1863°E

Production
- Products: Coking coal

Owner
- Company: Bharat Coking Coal Limited
- Website: http://www.bcclweb.in/
- Acquired: 1971-72

Block II Area is one of the 12 operational areas of BCCL located in Dhanbad Sadar subdivision of Dhanbad district in the state of Jharkhand, India.

== History ==
The Block II Area came into existence in 1983-84 with the reorganisation of collieries in the region and opening of the World Bank funded Block II Project.

== Geography ==
Collieries in the Barora and Block II Areas of BCCL
U: Underground colliery, O: Open Cast colliery, M: Mixed colliery, F: Facility, A: Administrative headquarters
Owing to space constraints in the small map, the actual locations in a larger map may vary slightly

=== Location ===
The Block II Area office is located at 23.7893°N 86.1863°E. The Block II Area is located 40 km from Dhanbad Junction railway station and 10 km from Netaji Subhas Chandra Bose Gomoh railway station.

The map alongside shows some of the collieries in the Area. However, as the collieries do not have individual pages, there are no links in the full screen map.

== Mining activity ==
- Block II colliery having Block II open cast project (departmental) plus crusher patch II A and III (with hired equipment).
- Jamunia colliery having Jamunia OCP (departmental) plus Kali Mandir patch II (with hired equipment).

== Mining support ==
Block II Area has the following workshop facilities:

- Block II OCP dumper workshop
- Jamunia OCP dumper workshop
- Regional repair workshop

== Mining plan ==
Cities, towns and locations in the western portion of Dhanbad Sadar subdivision in Dhanbad district
MC: Municipal Corporation, CT: Census Town, N: Neighbourhood, R: Rural/ Urban centre
Owing to space constraints in the small map, the actual locations in a larger map may vary slightly

An overview of the proposed mining activity plan in Cluster II, a group of 5 mines in the Block II and Barora Areas (showing only Block II here), as of 2012, is as follows:

1.Block II colliery has an operating open cast mine and a proposed underground mine. The open cast mine has a normative production capacity of 4 million tonnes per year and a peak production capacity of 5.2 million tonnes per year. It had an expected life of over 26 years. The underground mine has a normative production capacity of 0.45 million tonnes per year and a peak production capacity of 0.585 million tonnes per year. It had an expected life of over 30 years.

2. Jamunia colliery has an operating open cast mine. The open cast mine has a normative production capacity of 1.2 million tonnes per year and a peak production capacity of 1.56 million tonnes per year. It had an expected life of over 6 years.

== Mine fire ==
Block II OCP mine up to X seam, covering approximately 14.5 hectares is affected by mining fire. Efforts are being made to dig out the fiery coal.
