= Rajganj, Dhanbad =

Rajganj Rajabhita
- Census Town
- Location in Jharkhand, India Rajganj (India)
- Coordinates: 23.878389°N 86.338583°E
- Country: India
- State: Jharkhand
- District: Dhanbad

Area
  - Total: 3.2 km^{2} (1.2 sq mi)

Population (2011)
  - Total: 8,820
  - Density: 2,800/km^{2} (7,100/sq mi)

Languages
  - Official: Hindi, Urdu
- Time zone: UTC+5:30 (IST)
- PIN: 828113
- Lok Sabha constituency: Giridih
- Vidhan Sabha constituency: Baghmara
- Website: dhanbad.nic.in

Rajganj (also called Rajabhita) is a census town in Baghmara CD block in Dhanbad Sadar subdivision of Dhanbad district in the Indian state of Jharkhand.

== Geography ==
Cities, towns and locations in the northern portion of Dhanbad Sadar subdivision in Dhanbad district
MC: Municipal Corporation, CT: Census Town, N: Neighbourhood, R: Rural/ Urban centre
Owing to space constraints in the small map, the actual locations in a larger map may vary slightly

=== Location ===
Rajganj is located at 23.878389°N 86.338583°E.

Note: The map alongside presents some of the notable locations in the area. All places marked in the map are linked in the larger full screen map.

=== Overview ===
The region shown in the map lies to the north of Dhanbad city and is an extensive rural area with villages (particularly in the northern areas) scattered around hills. One of the many spurs of Pareshnath Hill (1,365.50 m), situated in neighbouring Giridih district, passes through the Topchanchi and Tundi areas of the district. The Barakar River flows along the northern boundary. The region shown in the map covers several CD blocks – Topchanchi, Govindpur, Tundi, Purbi Tundi and a small part of Baghmara. The Kolkata-Agra National Highway 19 (old number NH 2)/ Grand Trunk Road cuts across the southern part of the region.

=== Police station ===
There is a police station at Rajganj.

== Demographics ==
As per the 2011 Census of India, Rajganj had a total population of 8,820 of which 4,568 (52%) were males and 4,252 (48%) were females. Population below 6 years was 1,278. The total number of literates in Rajganj was 5,630 (74.65% of the population over 6 years).

== Infrastructure ==
Rajganj has an area of 3.2 km^{2}. It is 18 km from the district headquarters Dhanbad. There is a railway station at Dhanbad 18 km away. Buses are available in the town. It has 8 km roads and covered drains. The two major sources of protected water supply are uncovered wells and hand pumps. There are 1,420 domestic electric connections. Amongst the medical facilities it has 5 medicine shop. Amongst the educational facilities, it has 7 primary schools, 3 middle schools, 2 secondary school and 1 senior secondary school. The nearest general degree college is available at Dhawachita, Rajganj, Dhanbad. It has branches of 2 nationalised banks, 1 private commercial bank and 1 cooperative bank.

== Transport ==
Rajganj is on National Highway 19 (old number NH 2)/ Grand Trunk Road.

== Education ==
Rajganj Degree College was established in 1985 at Dhawachita, Rajganj. Affiliated to Binod Bihari Mahto Koylanchal University, it offers courses in arts and science.
