= Bhuli, India =

Bhuli Shramik Nagar
- Neighbourhood in Dhanbad
- Location in Jharkhand, India Bhuli (India)
- Coordinates: 23.8137°N 86.3887°E
- Country: India
- State: Jharkhand
- District: Dhanbad
- Founder: Babu Jagjivan Ram
- Named for: Bhuliya Devi(wife)

Government
  - Type: Municipal Corporation
  - Body: Nagar Palika

Population (2001)
  - Total: 89,584

Languages
  - Official: Hindi, Urdu
- Time zone: UTC+5:30 (IST)
- PIN: 828104 (A-Block) and 828105 (D-Block)
- Telephone code: 0326
- Vehicle registration: JH-10 and BR-17 (Before 15 November 2000)
- Website: dhanbad.nic.in

Bhuli is a neighbourhood in Dhanbad in Dhanbad Sadar subdivision of Dhanbad district in Jharkhand, India.

== Overview ==
It is famous for being the largest workers' colony in Asia. Town is managed by Bharat Coking Coal Limited(BCCL). Majority of the population used to work in BCCL; but out of the 6011 BCCL quarters in Bhuli, nearly 4021 are illegally occupied by retired employees and this has become a very controversial topic.

Maintenance work of quarters and road is undertaken by Bhuli Town Administration, situated near A-Block Post Office.

== History ==
Bhuli township was constructed in 1951 by The Coal Mines Welfare Organisation (CMWO) under the Ministry of Labour to provide housing facilities to miners. Bhuli is divided into 5 blocks. Initially it consisted only three blocks- Block-'A', 'B' and 'C'. Each block has 600 quarters. Each quarter is single storeyed; having two bedrooms, one kitchen, a veranda, a washroom, a bathroom and a small yard. Every quarter has a tree planted in its yard. The three blocks were transferred to BCCL in 1986. Two new blocks ('D' and 'E') were constructed in 1978 directly under the control of BCCL. But, the buildings in these blocks were made 3 storeyed, having 4 quarters at each storey, in contrast to Block A, B and C. Also, the new buildings lacked a yard and veranda, but provided a balcony for each quarter. Today, there are a total of 6011 quarters in all over the Bhuli Township. The whole town is based on grid pattern.

== Geography ==
Cities, towns and locations in the central portion of Dhanbad Sadar subdivision in Dhanbad district
MC: Municipal Corporation, CT: Census Town, N: Neighbourhood, R: Rural/ Urban centre
Owing to space constraints in the small map, the actual locations in a larger map may vary slightly

=== Location ===
Bhuli is located at 23.8137°N 86.3887°E.

Note: The map alongside presents some of the notable locations in the area. All places marked in the map are linked in the larger full screen map.

Bhuli, earlier a census town, was combined with other urban units to form Dhanbad Municipal Corporation in 2006.

Bhuli is spread over parts of Ward Nos. 14, 15 and 16 of Dhanbad Municipal Corporation.

=== Overview ===
The region shown in the map is a part of the undulating uplands bustling with coalmines in the lowest rung of the Chota Nagpur Plateau. The entire area shown in the map is under Dhanbad Municipal Corporation, except Belgaria which is under Baliapur (community development block). The places in the DMC area are marked as neighbourhoods. The DMC area shown in the map is around the core area of Dhanbad city. Another major area of DMC is shown in the map of the southern portion of the district. A small stretch of DMC, extending up to Katras is shown in the map of the western portion. The region is fully urbanised. Jharia (community development block) has been merged into DMC. Three operational areas of BCCL operate fully within the region – Sijua Area, Kusunda Area and Bastacola Area.

== Demographics ==
As of 2001 India census, Bhuli had a population of 89,584. Males constitute 54% of the population and females 46%. Bhuli has an average literacy rate of 63%, higher than the national average of 59.5%; with male literacy of 71% and female literacy of 55%. 15% of the population is under 6 years of age.

== Educational Institutions ==
Bhuli is home to a number of educational institutions that serve the academic needs of the local community and surrounding areas. The township hosts schools affiliated with national boards such as CBSE and ICSE, offering education from primary to senior secondary levels. Notable institutions in Bhuli include Imperial School of Learning, Saraswati Vidya Mandir, De Nobili School, Neeraj Memorial School and Aadarsh Madhyamik Vidya Niketan Mandir each contributing to the region's educational development and student empowerment.

== Imperial School of Learning, Bhuli ==
Imperial School of Learning (ISL), Bhuli, Dhanbad, is a co-educational English-medium institution affiliated with the Central Board of Secondary Education (CBSE), established in 1981. It is managed by the Academic Quest trust and is located in Murmu Colony, Bhulinagar, Dhanbad, Jharkhand (PIN: 828104).

=== History ===
Founded in 1981 by J K Sinha under the Academic Quest trust, ISL has been serving the Bhuli community for over four decades, promoting academic rigor and holistic education.

=== Campus & Facilities ===
The school operates from kindergarten to grade 12 and occupies approximately 6,475 m². It boasts modern facilities including digital classrooms, science and computer laboratories, a library, and sports areas islbhuli.in. The campus emphasizes safety with CCTV and secure infrastructure.

=== Academics ===
ISL prepares students to appear in CBSE board examinations. The curriculum covers core streams, and the medium of instruction is English.

== Saraswati Vidya Mandir, Bhuli ==
Saraswati Vidya Mandir (SVM), located in Bhuli, Dhanbad, is a co-educational school that follows the CBSE curriculum. Known for its emphasis on Indian culture, moral education, and academic discipline, the school serves students from primary to senior secondary levels. It is part of the Vidya Bharati Akhil Bharatiya Shiksha Sansthan network, a nationwide organization of schools committed to value-based education.

=== History ===
Saraswati Vidya Mandir was established to provide affordable, quality education to the residents of Bhuli and nearby regions. Over the years, it has earned a reputation for academic consistency, discipline, and cultural integration.

=== Academics ===
The school is affiliated with the Central Board of Secondary Education (CBSE) and offers a structured curriculum in science, commerce, and humanities streams. Regular assessments, Olympiads, and moral education programs are part of the academic framework.

=== Campus & Facilities ===
SVM Bhuli provides essential facilities including science and computer laboratories, a library, and a multipurpose hall. The school also promotes extracurricular activities like yoga, music, and sports to encourage holistic development.

=== Cultural & Moral Education ===
True to its name, Saraswati Vidya Mandir places a strong emphasis on instilling Indian values, discipline, and character-building through morning assemblies, Sanskrit shlokas, and value education sessions.

== Aadarsh Madhyamik Vidya Niketan Mandir ==
Aadarsh Madhyamik Vidya Niketan Mandir is a Hindi-medium secondary school located in Bhuli, Dhanbad. It provides education from middle to secondary level and is affiliated with the Jharkhand Academic Council (JAC). The school focuses on basic academics and value-based learning, serving the educational needs of local students in the Bhuli region.

== Markets ==
There are three main markets in the township. These are D-Block Market (D-Block), New Market (E-Block), and Shakti Market (D- Block Road).

Besides, four weekly Haats/Hatias (or markets especially dealing with buying and selling of vegetables and fruits) are set up in Bhuli-
1. Etwaari Hatia, Jharkhand More (on every Sunday, Etwaar means Sunday).
2. Somwaari Hatia, beside New Market and Durga Puja Hall, D-Block (on every Monday, Somwaar means Monday).
3. Budhni Hatia, near MPI, B-Block (on every Wednesday).
4. Shanichari Hatia, near Bhuli Railway Station (on every Saturday, Shanichar means Saturday).

== Hospitals ==
Currently, there are two Regional Hospitals in Bhuli working under BCCL in C-Block and D-Block for free health check-up (for BCCL employees and dependents). But due to the small number of BCCL employees living in Bhuli (not more than a hundred or two), the hospitals are not properly maintained. So, Coal India Limited (a Maharatna Company), under which BCCL works, decided in mid 2020, to close the hospitals due to poor management and maintenance and people not preferring to go to these BCCL hospitals (Hospital staff and doctors will be transferred to other places). Instead, most people prefer visiting private clinics that are spread across Bhuli.

== Banks ==
Bhuli has branches of Bank of India, State Bank of India and a branch of UCO Bank. Apart from that, ICICI Bank, AXIS Bank, Bank of India and State Bank of India have their ATMs in Bhuli.

== Transport ==
Bhuli is well connected to Dhanbad city through road and railway. Most of the (local) passenger trains stop here.

== Religious harmony ==
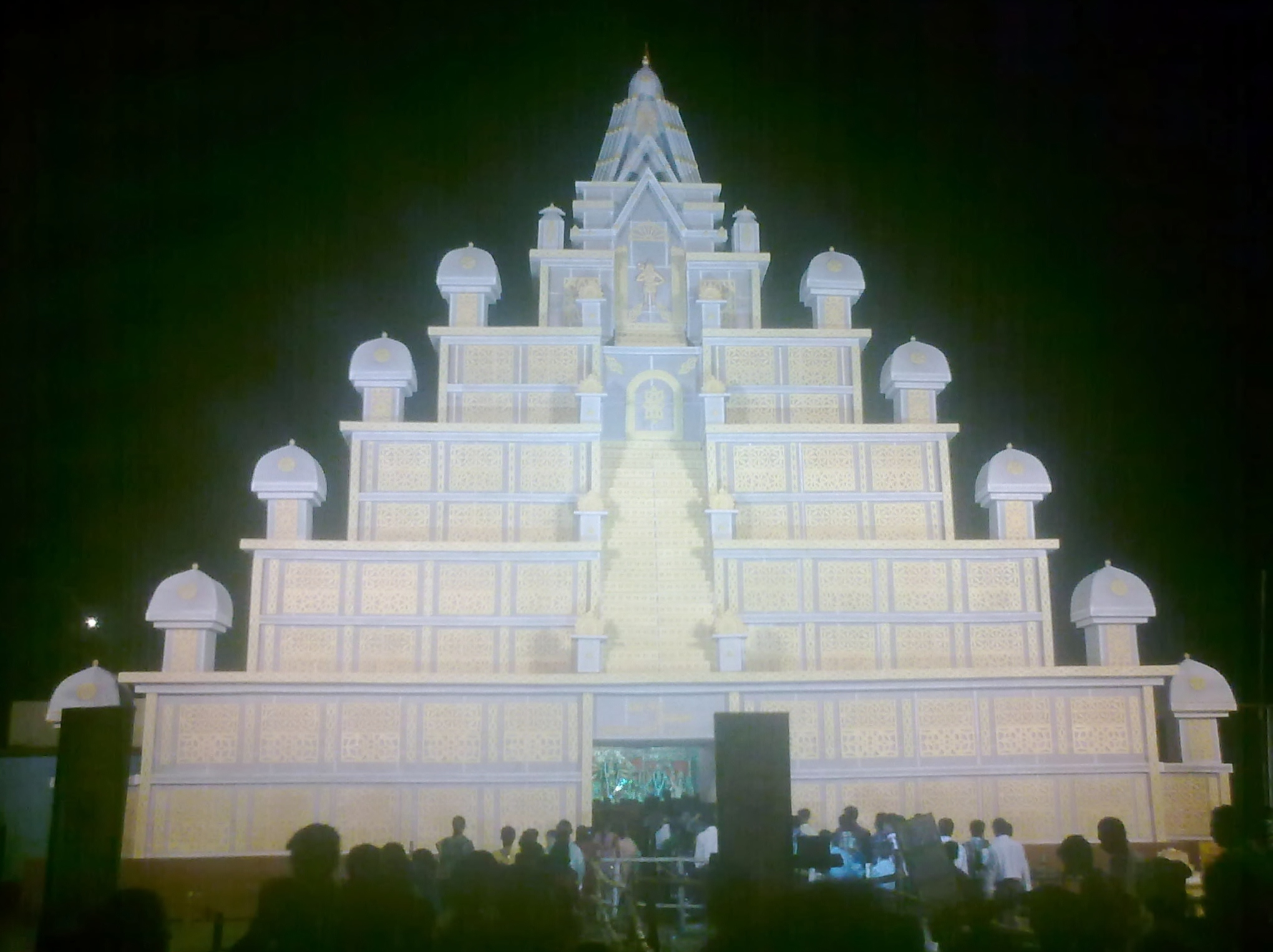
Bhuli 'B' Block Durga Mandap

Bhuli witnesses a religious harmony among all the religions, especially Hindus and Muslims. Interestingly, the tradition of celebrating Durga Puja, a Hindu festival, was started by Abdul Majid Khan, a Muslim by religion. Similarly, Muharram, a Muslim festival, was started by a Hindu- Sudhir Mukherjee. The reason behind this act was to prevent communal riots during the partition of India. Residents claim that Bhuli has never witnessed any communal problems since 1949.
