= Kustai =

- Neighbourhood in Dhanbad
- Location in Jharkhand, India Kustai (India)
- Coordinates: 23.76°N 86.39°E
- Country: India
- State: Jharkhand
- District: Dhanbad

Population (2001)
  - Total: 12,268

Languages
  - Official: Hindi, Urdu
- Time zone: UTC+5:30 (IST)
- Vehicle registration: JH
- Website: dhanbad.nic.in

Kustai is a neighbourhood in Dhanbad in Dhanbad Sadar subdivision of Dhanbad district in Jharkhand state, India.

== Geography ==
Cities, towns and locations in the southern portion of Dhanbad Sadar subdivision in Dhanbad district
MC: Municipal Corporation, CT: Census Town, N: Neighbourhood, R: Rural/ Urban centre
Owing to space constraints in the small map, the actual locations in a larger map may vary slightly

=== Location ===
Kustai is located at 23.76°N 86.39°E.

Note: The map alongside presents some of the notable locations in the area. All places marked in the map are linked in the larger full screen map.

The earlier census town was combined with other urban units to form Dhanbad Municipal Corporation in 2006.

Kustai is located next to Kustore in Ward No. 13 of Dhanbad Municipal Corporation.

=== Overview ===
The region shown in the map is a part of the undulating uplands bustling with coalmines. The Damodar River, the most important river of the Chota Nagpur Plateau, flows along the southern border. A major part of the area shown in the map is part of Dhanbad Municipal Corporation, an urban area. The places in the DMC area are marked as neighbourhoods. The western part of the region shown in the map is covered by Dhanbad (community development block). 57% of the population of Dhanbad CD block reside in rural areas and 43% reside in urban areas, The east-central part of the region shown in the map is covered by Baliapur (community development block). 86% of the population of Baliapur CD block reside in rural areas and 14% reside in urban areas. The places in the CD block areas are marked mostly as census towns. Three operational areas of BCCL operate fully within the region – Pootkee Balihari Area, Lodna Area and Eastern Jharia Area. The Moonidih sector of Western Jharia Area also operates in the region.

== Demographics ==
As of 2001 India census, Kustai had a population of 12,268. Males constitute 56% of the population and females 44%. Kustai has an average literacy rate of 62%, higher than the national average of 59.5%: male literacy is 72%, and female literacy is 49%. In Kustai, 15% of the population is under 6 years of age.

== Transport ==
The Kendua-Jharia Road passes through Kustai.

There is a station at Karkend nearby on the Gomoh-Adra line.
