= Chasnala =

- Neighbourhood in Dhanbad
- Location in Jharkhand, India Chasnala (India)
- Coordinates: 23.6635°N 86.4516°E
- Country: India
- State: Jharkhand
- District: Dhanbad

Languages
  - Official: Hindi, Urdu
- Time zone: UTC+5:30 (IST)
- PIN: 110092
- Website: dhanbad.nic.in

Chasnala is a neighbourhood in Dhanbad in Dhanbad subdivision of Dhanbad district in the Indian state of Jharkhand.

== Geography ==
Cities, towns and locations in the southern portion of Dhanbad Sadar subdivision in Dhanbad district
MC: Municipal Corporation, CT: Census Town, N: Neighbourhood, R: Rural/ Urban centre
Owing to space constraints in the small map, the actual locations in a larger map may vary slightly

=== Location ===
Chasnala is located at 23.6635°N 86.4516°E.

Note: The map alongside presents some of the notable locations in the area. All places marked in the map are linked in the larger full screen map.

Chasnala was combined with other urban units to form Dhanbad Municipal Corporation in 2006. Chasnala is part of Ward No. 51 of Dhanbad Municipal Corporation.

=== Overview ===
The region shown in the map is a part of the undulating uplands bustling with coalmines. It was the site of the Chasnala mining disaster in 1975. The Damodar River, the most important river of the Chota Nagpur Plateau, flows along the southern border. A major part of the area shown in the map is part of Dhanbad Municipal Corporation, an urban area. The places in the DMC area are marked as neighbourhoods. The western part of the region shown in the map is covered by Dhanbad (community development block). 57% of the population of Dhanbad CD block reside in rural areas and 43% reside in urban areas, The east-central part of the region shown in the map is covered by Baliapur (community development block). 86% of the population of Baliapur CD block reside in rural areas and 14% reside in urban areas. The places in the CD block areas are marked mostly as census towns. Three operational areas of BCCL operate fully within the region – Pootkee Balihari Area, Lodna Area and Eastern Jharia Area. The Moonidih sector of Western Jharia Area also operates in the region.

== Economy ==
Steel Authority of India owns and operates Chasnala colliery.

== Education ==
Chasnala Academy was established in 1973. It is a co-educational institution offering CBSE courses. It has facilities for teaching from Lower KG to Class X.

== See also ==
- Chasnala mining disaster
