= Kailudih =

- Neighbourhood in Dhanbad
- Location in Jharkhand, India Kailudih (India)
- Coordinates: 23.7964°N 86.2891°E
- Country: India
- State: Jharkhand
- District: Dhanbad

Population (2001)
  - Total: 8,903

Languages
  - Official: Hindi, Urdu
- Time zone: UTC+5:30 (IST)
- PIN: 828116
- Vehicle registration: JH10
- Website: dhanbad.nic.in

Kailudih is a neighbourhood in Dhanbad in Dhanbad Sadar subdivision of Dhanbad district in Jharkhand state, India.

== Geography ==
Cities, towns and locations in the western portion of Dhanbad Sadar subdivision in Dhanbad district
MC: Municipal Corporation, CT: Census Town, N: Neighbourhood, R: Rural/ Urban centre
Owing to space constraints in the small map, the actual locations in a larger map may vary slightly

=== Location ===
Kailudih is located at 23.7964°N 86.2891°E.

Note: The map alongside presents some of the notable locations in the area. All places marked in the map are linked in the larger full screen map.

The earlier census town was combined with other urban units to form Dhanbad Municipal Corporation in 2006.

Kailudih is part of Ward No. 2 of Dhanbad Municipal Corporation.

=== Overview ===
The region shown in the map is a part of the undulating uplands bustling with coalmines. The Damodar River, the most important river of the Chota Nagpur Plateau, flows along the southern border. The area beyond the Damodar was once a part of Dhanbad district but was transferred to Bokaro district in 2001. Bulk of the area shown in the map is part of Baghmara (community development block). In Baghmara CD block 67% of the population lives in rural areas and 33% in urban areas. The block has 18 census towns, all marked in the map, except Rajganj, which is shown in the map for the northern portion of the district. A portion of Dhanbad Municipal Corporation extends into the region till around Katras. The places in the DMC area are marked as neighbourhoods. Most of the DMC area is shown in the maps for the central and southern portions of the district. Four operational areas of BCCL operate fully within the region – Katras Area, Govindpur Area, Barora Area and Block II Area. The Mahuda sector of Western Jharia Area also operates in the region.

== Demographics ==
As of 2001 India census, Kailudih had a population of 8,903. Males constitute 54% of the population and females 46%. Kailudih has an average literacy rate of 56%, lower than the national average of 59.5%: male literacy is 63%, and female literacy is 49%. In Kailudih, 18% of the population is under 6 years of age.

== Economy ==
West Koiludih Colliery, operated by West Koiludih Colliery Co., was one of the 31 private collieries taken over at the time of nationalisation of coking coal mines, and formed part of Govindpur Area of BCCL. It is no more in operation.
