= Kenduadih =

- Neighbourhood in Dhanbad
- Location in Jharkhand, India Kenduadih (India)
- Coordinates: 23.738958°N 86.375675°E
- Country: India
- State: Jharkhand
- District: Dhanbad
- Elevation: 196 m (643 ft)

Population (2001)
  - Total: 8,354

Languages
  - Official: Hindi, Urdu
- Time zone: UTC+5:30 (IST)
- PIN: 828117
- Vehicle registration: JH
- Website: dhanbad.nic.in

Kenduadih is a neighbourhood in Dhanbad in Dhanbad Sadar subdivision of Dhanbad district in Jharkhand state, India.

== Geography ==
Cities, towns and locations in the southern portion of Dhanbad Sadar subdivision in Dhanbad district
MC: Municipal Corporation, CT: Census Town, N: Neighbourhood, R: Rural/ Urban centre
Owing to space constraints in the small map, the actual locations in a larger map may vary slightly

=== Location ===
Kenduadih is located at 23.78°N 86.38°E. It has an average elevation of 196 metres (643 feet).In and around a number of open cast mines operated by B.C.C.L.

Note: The map alongside presents some of the notable locations in the area. All places marked in the map are linked in the larger full screen map.

The earlier census town was combined with other urban units to form Dhanbad Municipal Corporation in 2006.

Kenduadih is part of Ward No. 12 of Dhanbad Municipal Corporation.

=== Overview ===
The region shown in the map is a part of the undulating uplands bustling with coalmines. The Damodar River, the most important river of the Chota Nagpur Plateau, flows along the southern border. A major part of the area shown in the map is part of Dhanbad Municipal Corporation, an urban area. The places in the DMC area are marked as neighbourhoods. The western part of the region shown in the map is covered by Dhanbad (community development block). 57% of the population of Dhanbad CD block reside in rural areas and 43% reside in urban areas, The east-central part of the region shown in the map is covered by Baliapur (community development block). 86% of the population of Baliapur CD block reside in rural areas and 14% reside in urban areas. The places in the CD block areas are marked mostly as census towns. Three operational areas of BCCL operate fully within the region – Pootkee Balihari Area, Lodna Area and Eastern Jharia Area. The Moonidih sector of Western Jharia Area also operates in the region.

=== Police station ===
There is a police station at Kenduadih.

== Demographics ==
As of 2001 India census, Kenduadih had a population of 8,354. Males constitute 54% of the population and females 46%. Kenduadih has an average literacy rate of 57%, lower than the national average of 59.5%: male literacy is 69%, and female literacy is 43%. In Kenduadih, 15% of the population is under 6 years of age.

== Economy ==
Prior to nationalization of coking coal mines Kenduadih Colliery was operated by East India Coal Company Limited from 1892. The working of the underground colliery was discontinued in 1992. Now, there is an open cast mine.

Producing mines in the Pootkee Balihari Area (PB Area in short) of BCCL are: PB Project Colliery, KB 10/12 Pits Colliery, Bhagaband Colliery and Gopalichak Colliery. Non-producing mines in the PB Area are: KB 5/6 Pits Colliery, Kenduadih Colliery and Putkee Colliery. Other units of the PB Area are: B.C.Plant, Ekra Workshop, Kenduadih Auto Workshop and 132 kv substation. The area office is located at Aralgoria.

The PB Area has about 6,000 quarters for employees.

== Education ==
S.S.N.M. High School is located at Bhagaband Basti, Kenduadih.
