= Jamadoba =

- Neighbourhood in Dhanbad
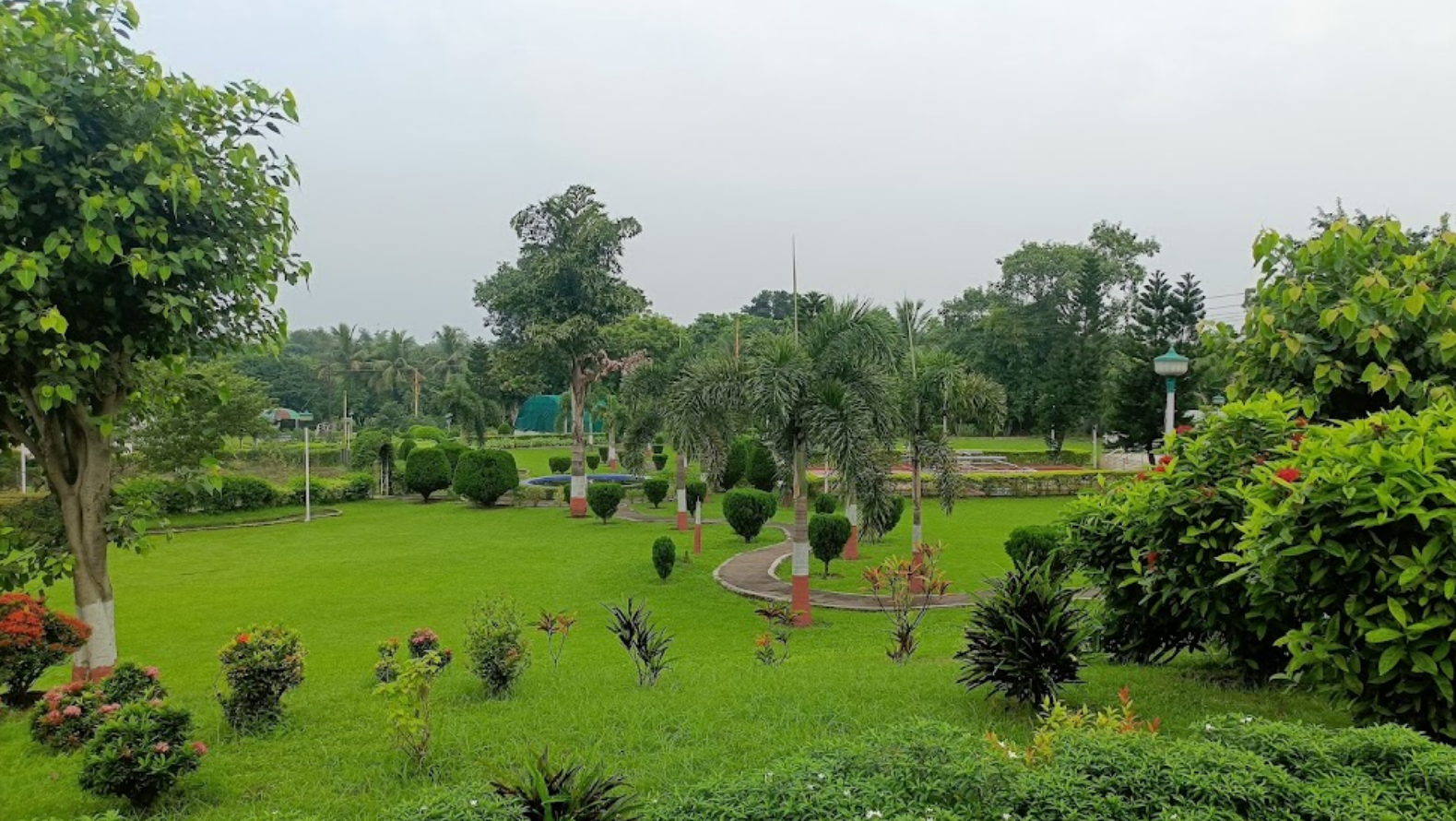

- Location in Jharkhand, India Jamadoba (India)
- Coordinates: 23.72°N 86.4°E
- Country: India
- State: Jharkhand
- District: Dhanbad
- Elevation: 153 m (502 ft)

Population (2001)
  - Total: 33,981

Languages
  - Official: Hindi, Kurmali
- Time zone: UTC+5:30 (IST)
- PIN: 828131
- Vehicle registration: JH
- Website: dhanbad.nic.in

Jamadoba is a neighbourhood in Dhanbad in Dhanbad Sadar subdivision in Dhanbad district in Jharkhand state, India.

== Geography ==
Cities, towns and locations in the southern portion of Dhanbad Sadar subdivision in Dhanbad district
MC: Municipal Corporation, CT: Census Town, N: Neighbourhood, R: Rural/ Urban centre
Owing to space constraints in the small map, the actual locations in a larger map may vary slightly

=== Location ===
Jamadoba is located at 23.72°N 86.4°E. It has an average elevation of 153 metres (501 feet).

Note: The map alongside presents some of the notable locations in the area. All places marked in the map are linked in the larger full screen map.

The earlier census town was combined with other urban units to form Dhanbad Municipal Corporation in 2006.

Jamadoba is part of Ward No. 43 of Dhanbad Municipal Corporation.

=== Overview ===
The region shown in the map is a part of the undulating uplands bustling with coalmines. The Damodar River, the most important river of the Chota Nagpur Plateau, flows along the southern border. A major part of the area shown in the map is part of Dhanbad Municipal Corporation, an urban area. The places in the DMC area are marked as neighbourhoods. The western part of the region shown in the map is covered by Dhanbad (community development block). 57% of the population of Dhanbad CD block reside in rural areas and 43% reside in urban areas, The east-central part of the region shown in the map is covered by Baliapur (community development block). 86% of the population of Baliapur CD block reside in rural areas and 14% reside in urban areas. The places in the CD block areas are marked mostly as census towns. Three operational areas of BCCL operate fully within the region – Pootkee Balihari Area, Lodna Area and Eastern Jharia Area. The Moonidih sector of Western Jharia Area also operates in the region.

== Famous places ==
Tata park is a famous place at Jamadoba. The park is maintained by TATA. The park remains open everyday only for Tata employees and their families, but on Sunday, all are allowed to visit the park. Park remains open from 4pm to 7:30pm. On Sunday, many people visit this park for refreshment. There is no charge for entering park. The park is covered with plants and flowers. Tata park is a good place for amusement for people residing there.

== Demographics ==
As of 2001 India census, Jamadoba had a population of 33,981. Males constitute 54% of the population and females 46%. Jamadoba has an average literacy rate of 62%, higher than the national average of 59.5%: male literacy is 71%, and female literacy is 51%. In Jamadoba, 15% of the population is under 6 years of age.

== Economy ==
Tata Steel leased six coal mines with metallurgical coal in Jharia coalfield between 1910 and 1918, These are grouped in two locations – Sijua and Jamadoba. The Bhelatand colliery of the Sijua Group was then acquired. Subsequently in 1918, Tata Steel acquired Malkera and Sijua as well as Jamadoba, Digwadih and 6&7 Pits Collieries of the Jamadoba Group.

== Education ==
Tata D.A.V School, Jamadoba was established at Jamadoba in 1987. An English-medium co-educational school, it is affiliated to the CBSE.

DAV Centenary Public School is located at Baniahir Lodna Area, PO Bhaga.

S.B. High School is located at Jamadoba.
