= Chhotaputki =

- Neighbourhood in Dhanbad
- Location in Jharkhand, India Chhotaputki (India)
- Coordinates: 23.77°N 86.36°E
- Country: India
- State: Jharkhand
- District: Dhanbad

Population (2001)
  - Total: 6,693

Languages
  - Official: Hindi, Urdu
- Time zone: UTC+5:30 (IST)
- Vehicle registration: JH
- Website: dhanbad.nic.in

Chhotaputki is a neighbourhood in Dhanbad in Dhanbad Sadar subdivision of Dhanbad district in Jharkhand state, India.

== Geography ==
Cities, towns and locations in the southern portion of Dhanbad Sadar subdivision in Dhanbad district
MC: Municipal Corporation, CT: Census Town, N: Neighbourhood, R: Rural/ Urban centre
Owing to space constraints in the small map, the actual locations in a larger map may vary slightly

=== Location ===
Chhotaputki is located at23.77°N 86.36°E.

Note: The map alongside presents some of the notable locations in the area. All places marked in the map are linked in the larger full screen map.

The earlier census town was combined with other urban units to form Dhanbad Municipal Corporation in 2006.

Chhotaputki is part of Ward No. 9 of Dhanbad Municipal Corporation.

Adjacent to Chhotaputki is Badaputki. On a whole these two makes it a live suburb named Putki. Majority of the residents here are from Choudhary, Ojha and Mahto community. The zip code of Putki is 828116

=== Overview ===
The region shown in the map is a part of the undulating uplands bustling with coalmines. The Damodar River, the most important river of the Chota Nagpur Plateau, flows along the southern border. A major part of the area shown in the map is part of Dhanbad Municipal Corporation, an urban area. The places in the DMC area are marked as neighbourhoods. The western part of the region shown in the map is covered by Dhanbad (community development block). 57% of the population of Dhanbad CD block reside in rural areas and 43% reside in urban areas, The east-central part of the region shown in the map is covered by Baliapur (community development block). 86% of the population of Baliapur CD block reside in rural areas and 14% reside in urban areas. The places in the CD block areas are marked mostly as census towns. Three operational areas of BCCL operate fully within the region – Pootkee Balihari Area, Lodna Area and Eastern Jharia Area. The Moonidih sector of Western Jharia Area also operates in the region.

== Demographics ==
As of 2001 India census, Chhotaputki had a population of 6,693. Males constitute 55% of the population and females 45%. Chhotaputki has an average literacy rate of 54%, lower than the national average of 59.5%; with male literacy of 63% and female literacy of 42%. 15% of the population is under 6 years of age.

== Economy ==
Collieries functioning in the P.B.Project Area of BCCL are: Balihari K.B., Balihari S.B., P.B.Project, Gopalichak, Pootkee, Bhagaband and Gopalichak 5/6.

Production in Putkee Colliery was stopped in 2006 and only pumping is being done to reduce the load in the neighbouring mine.

== Transport ==
It a suburb through which NH 18 (old no NH-32) passes.

There is a station at Karkend nearby on the Gomoh-Adra line.
