= Angarpathar =

- Neighbourhood
- Location in Jharkhand, India Angarpathar (India)
- Coordinates: 23.79°N 86.312°E
- Country: India
- State: Jharkhand
- District: Dhanbad

Population (2001)
  - Total: 8,179

Languages
  - Official: Hindi, Urdu
- Time zone: UTC+5:30 (IST)
- Vehicle registration: JH
- Website: dhanbad.nic.in

Angarpathar is a neighbourhood in Dhanbad city in Dhanbad Sadar subdivision of Dhanbad district in Jharkhand state, India.

== Geography ==
Cities, towns and locations in the western portion of Dhanbad Sadar subdivision in Dhanbad district
MC: Municipal Corporation, CT: Census Town, N: Neighbourhood, R: Rural/ Urban centre
Owing to space constraints in the small map, the actual locations in a larger map may vary slightly

=== Location ===
Angarpathar is located at 23.79°N 86.312°E.

Angarpathar is part of Ward No. 4 of Dhanbad Municipal Corporation.

Note: The map alongside presents some of the notable locations in the area. All places marked in the map are linked in the larger full screen map.

=== Overview ===
The region shown in the map is a part of the undulating uplands bustling with coalmines. The Damodar River, the most important river of the Chota Nagpur Plateau, flows along the southern border. The area beyond the Damodar was once a part of Dhanbad district but was transferred to Bokaro district in 2001. Bulk of the area shown in the map is part of Baghmara (community development block). In Baghmara CD block 67% of the population lives in rural areas and 33% in urban areas. The block has 18 census towns, all marked in the map, except Rajganj, which is shown in the map for the northern portion of the district. A portion of Dhanbad Municipal Corporation extends into the region till around Katras. The places in the DMC area are marked as neighbourhoods. Most of the DMC area is shown in the maps for the central and southern portions of the district. Four operational areas of BCCL operate fully within the region – Katras Area, Govindpur Area, Barora Area and Block II Area. The Mahuda sector of Western Jharia Area also operates in the region.

== Demographics ==
As of 2001 India census, Angarpathar had a population of 8,179. Males constitute 57% of the population and females 43%. Angarpathar has an average literacy rate of 55%, lower than the national average of 59.5%; with 68% of the males and 32% of females literate. 14% of the population is under 6 years of age.

== Economy ==
Collieries functioning in the Katras Area of BCCL are: Salanpur, Angarpathar, Keshalpur, Ramkanali, Ramkanali OC, West Mudidih, Galitand, Keshalpur OC, Katras Chot and East Katras.

== Transport ==
Angarpathar is on the Topchanchi-Gomoh-Phulwartanr-Dhanbad Road.

Train services on the 123-year old and 34 km long Dhanbad-Chandrapura line were closed on June 15, 2017 because of the risk of coal-seam fire. Fourteen stations, including Kusunda, Baseria, Bansjora, Sijua, Angarpathra, Katrasgarh, Tetulia, Sonardih, and Jamunia, were affected. Note:- Train services restored on February, 2019
