= Bastacola =

- Neighbourhood
- Location in Jharkhand, India Bastacola (India)
- Coordinates: 23.7686°N 86.4109°E
- Country: India
- State: Jharkhand
- District: Dhanbad
- Elevation: 194 m (636 ft)

Languages
  - Official: Hindi, Urdu
- Time zone: UTC+5:30 (IST)
- Telephone/ STD code: 0326
- Website: dhanbad.nic.in

Bastacola is a neighbourhood in Dhanbad in Dhanbad Sadar subdivision of Dhanbad district in the Indian state of Jharkhand.

== Geography ==
Bastacola was combined with other urban units to form Dhanbad Municipal Corporation in 2006. Bastacola is part of Ward No. 34 of Dhanbad Municipal Corporation.

It is located 8 km east of Dhanbad railway station.

== Economy ==
The Bastacola Area of BCCL is amalgamation of thirty-three private collieries of the pre-nationalisation era. After reorganisation, the Area has 4 underground mines - Bastacola, Bera, Dobari and Kuya, 2 departmentally operated open cast mines – Bastacola OCP, Bera OCP and one out-sourced OCP – Kujama OCP. Kujama colliery is closed since 1995 because of underground fire. Ghanoodih OCP is affected by surface fire.

== Healthcare ==
Bastacola Area has a 50-bedded Regional Hospital at Tisra, and dispensaries/ mini-dispensaries at Ghanoodih, Bera, Duburi, Kuya, Bastacola, Kujama.
