= Belgaria =

- Village
- Location in Jharkhand, India Belgaria (India)
- Coordinates: 23.762568°N 86.472345°E
- Country: India
- State: Jharkhand
- District: Dhanbad
- Elevation: 3,714 m (12,185 ft)

Population
  - Total: 2,011

Languages
  - Official: Hindi, Urdu
- Time zone: UTC+5:30 (IST)
- Website: dhanbad.nic.in

Belgaria is a village in Baliapur CD block in Dhanbad Sadar subdivision of Dhanbad district in the Indian state of Jharkhand.

== Geography ==
Cities, towns and locations in the central portion of Dhanbad Sadar subdivision in Dhanbad district
MC: Municipal Corporation, CT: Census Town, N: Neighbourhood, R: Rural/ Urban centre
Owing to space constraints in the small map, the actual locations in a larger map may vary slightly

=== Location ===
Belgaria is located at 23.762568°N 86.472345°E.

Note: The map alongside presents some of the notable locations in the area. All places marked in the map are linked in the larger full screen map.

=== Overview ===
The region shown in the map is a part of the undulating uplands bustling with coalmines in the lowest rung of the Chota Nagpur Plateau. The entire area shown in the map is under Dhanbad Municipal Corporation, except Belgaria which is under Baliapur (community development block). The places in the DMC area are marked as neighbourhoods. The DMC area shown in the map is around the core area of Dhanbad city. Another major area of DMC is shown in the map of the southern portion of the district. A small stretch of DMC, extending up to Katras is shown in the map of the western portion. The region is fully urbanised. Jharia (community development block) has been merged into DMC. Three operational areas of BCCL operate fully within the region – Sijua Area, Kusunda Area and Bastacola Area.

== Demographics ==
As per the 2011 Census of India, Belgaria had a total population of 3,744 of which 1,952 (52%) were males and 1,802 (48%) were females. Population below 6 years was 562. The total number of literates in Belgaria was 1,666 (52.36% of the population over 6 years).

== Education ==
Raja Shiva Prasad College was established in 1951 at Bhagatdih, Jharia. It was shifted to Belgaria, 5 km away, in 2018, because of underground mine fire.
