= BCCL =

BCCL may refer to:

- Bennett, Coleman and Co. Ltd. or The Times Group, a media company in India
- Bharat Coking Coal Limited, a subsidiary of Coal India Limited
