= Shaheed Nirmal Mahto Medical College, Dhanbad =

College in Jharkhand, India

Shaheed Nirmal Mahto Medical College and Hospital
- Former name: Patliputra Medical College
- Type: Government Medical College
- Established: 1969; 57 years ago
- Academic affiliations: Binod Bihari Mahto Koyalanchal University, NMC
- Principal: Dr. R. K. Mahto
- Undergraduates: 100
- Location: Dhanbad, Jharkhand, India; 23.8087°N 86.4624°E
- Campus: Urban
- Website: {{URL|https://www.snmmc.org}

Shaheed Nirmal Mahto Medical College, established in 1969, is a full-fledged tertiary government medical college and hospital.

== History ==
This college was established in 1971 under private management as Patliputra Medical College at Ashok Raj Path, Patna. Later, the government of Bihar transferred the college to Dhanbad, This college was associated with the Dhanbad Sadar Hospital. Later, SSLNT hospital Purana Bazaar Dhanbad and Central Hospital Jagjeevan Nagar Dhanbad was also associated with this college.

The medical college and hospital expanded onto 60 acres (24 ha) of land in Saraidhela, Dhanbad. Buildings were constructed for the medical college (functional from 1977) and hospital (functional from 2001 to 2002) with a capacity of 900 beds.

== Affiliated ==
The college is affiliated with Binod Bihari Mahto Koylanchal University and is recognized by the National Medical Commission.
