= Jatudih =

- Village
- Location in Jharkhand, India Jatudih (India)
- Coordinates: 23.7272°N 86.3554°E
- Country: India
- State: Jharkhand
- District: Dhanbad

Population (2011)
  - Total: 450

Languages
  - Official: Hindi, Urdu
- Time zone: UTC+5:30 (IST)
- Website: dhanbad.nic.in

Jatudih is a village in Dhanbad CD Block in Dhanbad subdivision of Dhanbad district, in the state of Jharkhand, India.

== Demographics ==
As per the 2011 Census of India, Jatudih had a total population of 450 of which 222 (49%) were males and 228 (51%) were females. Population below 6 years was 82. The total number of literates in Jatudih was 263 (71.47% of the population over 6 years).
