= Dudhiya =

Village in India

- Village
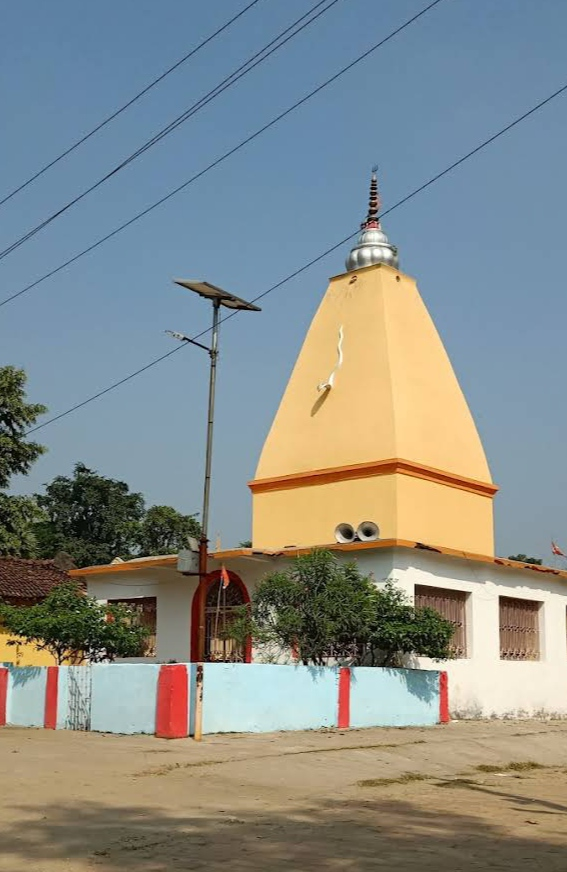

- Location in Jharkhand, India Dudhiya (India)
- Coordinates: 23°42′26″N 86°33′55″E
- Country: India
- State: Jharkhand
- District: Dhanbad

Government
  - Type: Representative Democracy
  - Body: Dudhiya Panchayat

Area
  - Total: 5.65 km^{2} (2.18 sq mi)
- Elevation: 199 m (653 ft)

Population (2011)
  - Total: 3,046
  - Density: 539/km^{2} (1,400/sq mi)

Languages
  - Official: Hindi, Urdu
- Time zone: UTC+5:30 (IST)
- PIN: 828201 (Baliapur)
- Telephone/ STD code: 0326
- Vehicle registration: JH 10
- Website: dhanbad.nic.in

Dudhiya is a village in Baliapur (community development block) of Dhanbad district in Jharkhand, India.

== Overview ==
It has an area of 5.65 km² and a total population of 3,046, of which 1572 are male and 1474 are female. Dudhiya also belongs to the Sindri Assembly constituency and Dhanbad Lok Sabha constituency.

== Maoist Activities ==
Jharkhand is one of the states affected by Maoist activities. As of 2012, Dhanbad was one of the highly/moderately affected districts in the state. As of 2016, Dhanbad was not identified as a focus area by the state police to check Maoist activities. However, there were some isolated Maoist activities in the Dhanbad area.
