= Dhanbad Municipal Corporation =

Local civic body in Dhanbad, Jharkhand, India

Dhanbad Municipal Corporation धनबाद नगर निगम
- Official logo of Dhanbad Municipal Corporation

History
- Founded: 2006; 20 years ago

Leadership
- Mayor: Sanjeev Singh
- Deputy Mayor: Arun Chauhan
- Municipal Commissioner: Satyendra Kumar
- Seats: 55

Elections
- Last election: 2026
- Next election: 2031

Website
- udhd.jharkhand.gov.in/ulb/Dhanbad/Dhanbad.aspx

Dhanbad Municipal Corporation is the civic body that governs Dhanbad, Katras, Jharia, Sindri, and the surrounding areas in Dhanbad subdivision of Dhanbad district, Jharkhand, India. Municipal Corporation mechanism in India was introduced during British Rule with formation of municipal corporation in Madras (Chennai) in 1688, later followed by municipal corporations in Bombay (Mumbai) and Calcutta (Kolkata) by 1762. Dhanbad Municipal Corporation is headed by Mayor of city and governed by Commissioner. Dhanbad Municipal Corporation has been formed with functions to improve the infrastructure of town.

== History ==
Dhanbad Municipal Corporation was formed in 2006 by combining erstwhile Dhanbad municipality, Jharia notified area, Sindri notified area, Katras notified area, Chattandih notified area, 27 census towns and 258 villages. It covered an area of 355.77 km^{2} with a population of 1,333,719 (2001 census).

During the British period, Dhanbad was a subdivision of Manbhum district. Bagsuma, located 4 miles east of Gobindpur, was the first headquarter of the subdivision. The headquarter was later shifted to Gobindpur and finally to Hirapur mouza in Dhanbad in 1908. Dhanbad was constituted as a separate district in 1956 by carving it out of Manbhum district.

== Geography ==
Notification No. 520 dated 12 July 2008 of Jharkhand Gazette (in Hindi) provides a full list of revenue villages placed under Dhanbad Municipal Corporation.

== Economy ==
=== Livelihood ===
Livelihood
in Dhanbad Municipal Corporation
1. Cultivators (0.74%)
2. Agricultural labourers (1.62%)
3. Household industries (2.73%)
4. Other Workers (94.9%)

In Dhanbad Municipal Corporation in 2011, amongst the class of total workers, cultivators numbered 2,376 and formed 0.74%, agricultural labourers numbered 5,174 and formed 1.62%, household industry workers numbered 8,732 and formed 2.73% and other workers numbered 303,035 and formed 94.90%. Total workers numbered 319,317 and formed 27.47% of the total population, and non-workers numbered 843,155 and formed 72.53% of the population.

Note: In the census records a person is considered a cultivator, if the person is engaged in cultivation/ supervision of land owned. When a person who works on another person's land for wages in cash or kind or share, is regarded as an agricultural labourer. Household industry is defined as an industry conducted by one or more members of the family within the household or village, and one that does not qualify for registration as a factory under the Factories Act. Other workers are persons engaged in some economic activity other than cultivators, agricultural labourers and household workers. It includes factory, mining, plantation, transport and office workers, those engaged in business and commerce, teachers and entertainment artistes.

== Demographics ==
As per the 2011 Census of India, Dhanbad Municipal Corporation had a total population of 1,162,472 of which 614,722 (53%) were males and 547,750 (47%) were females. Population below 6 years was 148,220. The total number of literates in Dhanbad Municipal Corporation was 805,982 (79.47% of the population over 6 years).

=== Language ===
Hindi is the official language in Jharkhand and Urdu has been declared as an additional official language. Jharkhand legislature had passed a bill according the status of a second official language to several languages in 2011 but the same was turned down by the Governor.

In the 2011 census, Hindi and Khortha was the mother-tongue (languages mentioned under Schedule 8 of the Constitution of India) of 62.5% of the population in Dhanbad district, followed by Bengali (19.3%) and Urdu (8.1%). The scheduled tribes constituted 8.4% of the total population of the district. Amongst the scheduled tribes those speaking Santali formed 77.2% of the ST population. Other tribes found in good numbers were: Munda, Mahli and Kora.

== Revenue sources ==
The following are the Income sources for the Corporation from the Central and State Government.

=== Revenue from taxes ===
Following is the Tax related revenue for the corporation.

- Property tax.
- Profession tax.
- Entertainment tax.
- Grants from Central and State Government like Goods and Services Tax.
- Advertisement tax.

=== Revenue from non-tax sources ===
Following is the Non Tax related revenue for the corporation.

- Water usage charges.
- Fees from Documentation services.
- Rent received from municipal property.
- Funds from municipal bonds.

== Education ==
As per 2011 census, schools and colleges per 10,000 population in Dhanbad Municipal Corporation were as follows (average for the district is given in brackets): Primary 2.06 (2.46), Middle 1.42 (1.83), Secondary/ matriculation 0.62 (0.79), senior secondary 0.28 (0.32) and college 0.07 (0.06). The educational facilities available in the statutory towns/ urban areas of the district are very inadequate, in spite of the area having many mining/ industrial establishments.

== Wards: Electoral ==
Elections for the position of councilors in Dhanbad Municipal Corporation were held in 2015. The electoral outcome in different wards is as follows:

Ward No	Boundaries	Neighbourhood	Reservation	Councillor
1	North: Shiv Mandir, Raghunathpur. South: Kali Mandir, Bajrangbali Mandir. East: Rajganj-Katras Road. West: Bhandaridih, Katras, Topchanchi Road.	Katras, Tilatanr, Bhatmurna, Akash Kinaree	OBC	Benode Kumar Goswami
2	North: Katras. South: Malkera. East: Salanpur, Chhatabad. West: Akash Kinaree.	Gobindpur, Kailudih, Bhandardih	Women	Ruhi Nasir
3	North: Salanpur. South: Chhatabad. East: Katras, Rajganj. West: Bhandardih	Salanpur, Katras	OBC	Vinayak Kumar Gupta
4	North: Salanpur. South: Dhanbad CD Block. East: Belunjabad. West: Malkera	Chhatabad, Lakarka, Angarpathar	SC	Rammurty Singh
5	North: Katras, Rajganj. South: Dhanbad CD Block, Angarpathra. East: Nagrikala. West: Sendra, Bansjora	Chandaur, Pandeydih, Belujabandh, Ramkanali, Kantapahari, Keshalpur	SC	Rajendra Prasad
6	North: Baghmara CD Block. South: Ekra River. East: Gaderia Ekra Road. West: Modidih, Sijua, Jogidih	Tetulmari, Jogta, Kankani, Sendra, Bansjora	Women	Mahendra Kumar Mahato
7	North: Baghmara CD Block. South: Ekra River. East: Tetulmari, Jogta, Kankani. West: Baghmara CD Block	Modidih, Bhadrichak, Bholatanr, Sijua, Jagudih	None	Nanda Dulal Sengupta
8	North: Baghmara CD Block. South: Ekra River. East: Katri River, Garbhudih, Dhariajoba. West: Kankani, Bansjora, partly Gaderia Ekra Road	Loyabad, Ekra, Gaderia, Basdeopur, Nichitpur	SC	Mahavir Pasi
9	North: Ekra River. South: Bhagabandh Road. East: Karkend-Katras Road, partly Kenduadih Road. West: Pandar Kanali, Sialgudri	Karkend, Chhotaputki, Baraputki, New Marine Pasi Ghowrah, Gopali Chak, Putki Bazar	SC Women	Savitri Devi
10	North: railway line. South: Nayadih, Gandudih. East: Matkuria, Joria Nala. West: Kenduadih	Godhar, Dhariajoba, Gandhudih, Basaria, Nimtalla	OBC	Devashis Paswan Akela
11	North: Baseria. South: Khaira. East: Kustore Road, partly Gangsadih. West: Karkendra	Chhatatanr, Kendua No.4 Biripatty, Hatgola Hariapatty, Muslim Tola, Gariman Patty, Rajput Basti, Naya Dhowrah	OBC	Baby Devi
12	North:Karkendra. South: Petia. East: Karia Jore and Kustore. West: Baraputki, Aralgaria Rajesh Bera	Balihari, Bhagbandh, Kenduadih	SC	Shova Devi
13	North: Chas Road. South: Kariajor River. East: Dhaunsar. West: Road towards D&E Blocks	Kustore, Keska Kusunda, Alkusha, Gangsadih, Khaira, Nayadih	SC Woman	Karmi Devi
14	North: Road towards D Block. South: BCCL drain. East: Road towards B Block. West: Road towards D&E Blocks	Bhulinagar D&E Blocks	None	Md. Nisar Alam
15	North: Baghmara CD Block.South: By-pass Road, Hirak Road. East: Railway line. West: Bhuli basti	Bhulinagar B&C Blocks	OBC	Mousami Kumari
16	North: Nawadih. South: Gaya railway line. East: Pandarpala. West: Bhuli B&E Blocks boundary and drain	Bhulinagar A Block, Purvi Bhuli, Azad Nagar, Bhulibasti, Mahatotola, Rawanitola	OBC	Aruna Kumari
17	North: Bhuli Road towards temple. South: Dhanbad-Bokaro railway line. East: Bhuli Road overbridge. West: Kamarmakhtumi Road, Matkuria Basti Road	Wasseypur, Nishat Nagar, Kamarmakhtumi Road, Noori Road, Dastola, Bhatta Mahalla, Madina Nagar, Ali Nagar, Bhuli Road Matkuria, Traction Colony	OBC Women	Tarannum Warsi
18	North: Bhuli Road Railway Line. South: Gongdhudih Godhar. East: Kamarmakhtumi Road. West: Chhota Kharikhabad	Matkuria Karimganj, Jabbar Campus Complex, New Masjid Area, Lala Tola, Rani Colony, Navi Nagar, Anfar Colony, Matkuria Mahato Tola Basti, Maruf Ganj, Adivasi Tola, Gulzar Bagh, Zonal Training, Railway Quarters Area, Chhota Kharikhabad	Women	Ashari Khatun
19	North: Nawadih. South: Bhuli Road Matkuria. East: Baramuri, Bishunpur. West: Bhulibasti	Pandarpala, Rahmatganj, Das Tola, Mahato Tola, New Kumhar Tola, Islampur, Millat Colony, Samsher Nagar, Asadak Nagar, Gaffar Colony	OBC	Mahjabeen Praveen
20	North: Gaya railway line, Pandarpala. South: Bhuli Road. East: Dhanbad-Bokaro railway line. West: Kariyajor drain	Naya Bazar, Gachhi Mohalla, Railway Colony, Kawadipatty, Bhuli Road, Karia Joria, Diamond Crossing	None	Ashok Kumar Gupta
21	North: Dhanbad-Bokaro railway line. South: Joraphatak Road, Satish Chandra Road. East: Dhanbad Jharia Line Bazar Road, Ratneswar Purana Bazar Road. West: Matkuria drain, Joria	Ghurni Jaria check-post, BCCL Colony, Railway Colony, Punjabi Mohalla, Gujarati Mohalla, Gurudwara Mohalla, Karbala Road, Mithu Road, Jamunabai Road, Dari Muhalla, Purana Bazar Road, Sabji Mandi, Telephone Exchange Road, Vikash Nagar	OBC Women	Andila Devi
22	North: Joraphatak Road. South: Bastacola Jharia, Satish Chandra Road. East: Old railway line. West: Kariajora drain, Nayadih	Bank Morh Ram Krishna Mission, Shanti Bhawan Complex, Shri Ram Plaza Complex, Dhobatanr Saraswati Sishumandir area, Shastrinagar, Dhaunsar, LRD Colony, BM Agrawal Colony, New Delhi Colony up to Mines Rescue Station, Kusunda, Jha Colony	Women	Eklabya Singh
23	North: Temple Road, DAV Road, Bhagawan Road, Dumaria Road. South: Chandmari Colliery. East: Baganbari Road. West: Joraphatak Road through Gandhinagar Road, Kewal Sons Road, Golard Hotel Road	Gandhi Nagar, Howrah Motors, Urmila Sinha Nursing Home area, Government Well, Shambhu Dharmashala area, Tentultalla Railway Colony, Refugee Market area, Tikiapara Mount Brassia, Dumariatanr	Women	Puspa Devi
24	North: Thetha. South: Gaya Siding track. East: Barwada Road. West: Pandarpala, Nawadih	Baramuri, Bishunpur, Babudih, VIP Colony, New Chandrasekhar Azad Nagar, Jay Prakash Nagar, Jharudih, Bakerbandh, Rangatanr	None	Manju Devi
25	North: Hirak Road, Mouza Bhelatanr. South: Mandal Kuli Tank, Gramin Road. East: Saraidhela Mouza. West: Bye Pass Road	Bartanr (on the right side of De Nobli), CMRI Colony, Mandalbasti, Simlabera, Rajwartola, Dhaiya, Memco, Dhirendrapuram, Thakurkulhi, Rattanr, ISM, Labony, Pandit Clinic Road, Harijanbasti, Korangapatty, Karmik Nagar, Bapu Nagar, Veer Kunwar Colony	None	Priya Ranjan
26	North: Gobindpur Road. South: Jharnapara Road. East: Saraidhela mouza. West: Gobindpur Road	Jharnapara, Etwari Road, Adarsha Nagar, Devipara, Simaldih, Telipara, Masterpara, Durga Mandir Para, J.C.Mullick Road, Preet Vihar Colony, Bauripara, Mairapara, Dompara, Premnagar, DGMS Colony, old ward no.1	None	Nirmal Kumar Mukherjee
27	North: Mandal Kuli Tank, northern portion of ISM boundary no.22.South: Gobindpur Road. East: Gobindpur Road. West: Barwaadda Road	Housing Colony, Police Line, CPWD Quarters, Court Quarters, DGMS Colony (Office), Income Tax Quarters, Golf Ground to the left of Bartanr, Manoramnagar, Kasturbanagar, Hirapur, UCO Bank area, Office Colony, P&T Colony, Bakerbandh tank	None	Kumar Ankesh Raj
28	North: Susnilewa Bholatanr. South: Narayanpur, Dhangi. East: Gobindpur, Bagula mouza. West: Theya	Kolakusma, Sabalpur, Chanakyanagar, Nilanchal Colony, Kodadih, Lapidih, Manjhladih, Kusum Vihar, Hindustan Steel Colony, Bholatanr, Susnilewa, Karmiknagar (part)	OBC	Pooja Kumari
29	North: Gobindpur Road. South: Narayanpur, Damodarpur. East: Kolakusma. West: Hirapur	Jagjivan Nagar, Nutandih, Saraidhela, Krishnanagar, Cooperative Colony, Bank Colony, Sabpara, Dompara, Mochipara, Koylanagar, New Colony	None	Sanju Devi
30	North: Jharnapara Road. South: Dhanbad-Howrah railway line, Barmasia. East: Damodarpur mouza. West: Kacheri Road, Pachpan boundary, Railway Hospital Road	Jharnapara (part), Hirapur hatia, Gyan Mukherjee Road, Court Quarters, Kacheri Road, Hari Mandir Road, Ajantapara, Abhay Sundari Girls’ School Road, Pandeya Mohalla, Majhibasti North, Loco Tank, DS Colony, Hill Colony, Mada Colony, Hindu Mission Road, Smashan Road, Batkhara Office Road	None	Nirmala Devi
31	North: Gobindpur Road. South: Barmasia PCC Road. East: Kacheri Road, Pachpan boundary, Railway Hospital Road. West: Dhanbad railway station, C Road	From the Gol Building area to the Hindustan Petroleum area, Old Railway Station Colony, Dhobi Talab, From Kali Mandir to Shyam Babu's stone cottage, northern portion of the Railway Colony, a portion of DS Office Colony, The area to the west of Anchal Office, Bhistipara, Lindsay Club Road, Jacklaysay Quarters, Police Quarters, DC Office	None	Usha Singh
32	North: Dhanbad-Howrah railway line. South: Dhokhra, Patrakuli, Dahuatanr. East: Damodarpur. West: Manaitanr	Barmasia, Bhuda, Kumharpatty, Gajuatanr, Binode Nagar (part)	None	Rakesh Ram
33	North: Pran Jiwan Circular Road, Barmasia Road. South: Jharia CD Block. East: Bazar Trading Ground Road. West: Jharia CD Block	Jharna Bera, Patra Kulhi, Duhatanr, Chhat Talab, Manaitanr Basti, Sidhara Talab, Mandi Godam, Bhabatarini Path, Tadrbagan, the area to the east of Gol Building, the area around the lane of old Bank of India	None	Menka Singh
34	North: Dhanbad Anchal area, the road from Joraphatak to Bera colliery morh. South: The road leading to BOI and Bokapahari. East: The road leading from Dobari Colliery to Jharia, Joria. West: Jharia-Dhanbad Road	Bastacola, Bherakanta	SC Women	Gori Devi
35	North: Open Cast Project, Dhanbad Anchal. South: The road from Katras Morh, Jharia to Simlabahal. East: Bastacola mouza. West: Sirgija-Horiladih Road	Bhagatdih, Gopalchak, Borgirh	None	Niranjan Kumar
36	North: Old railway line. South: Main Road Sabji Patti Morh. East: Jharia railway line. West: Katras Mor	Shiv Mandir Road, Gaddi Mohalla, Borapatti, Manbad	OBC Women	Suman Devi
37	North: Baliapur Road. South: Hanumangarhi. East: Jharia-Dhnuadih Road. West: Jharia Exchange Road	Main Road Jharia, Sonapatti, Dalpatti, Lalbazar, Bata Morh Main Road, Gandhi Road, Golghar Gosala, Gamchhapatti, Fatehpur line, Santosh Nagar, No. 4 Sabji Bagan, Koundiapatti, Balugachha, Chini Kothi, Gujarati Mohalla, station adjacent to Ram Chandra Dal, Lilori Pathra, Purvi Koiribandh, Paschimi Koiribandh, Raj Ground, Katras Morh, Lachminiya Morh, Tina Godam, Sabjipatti	OBC	Shailendra Kumar Singh
38	North: Jharia Sabji Main Road. South: Thana Road. East: Dhanbad Exchange Road. West: Railway line Malgarha	Rajbari Manbad, Amlapara Thana Road, New Amlapara, Chowthai Kulhi, Babri Mohallah, Indira Nagar	OBC Women	Jai Kumar
39	North: Thana Road, Children Road. South: Fire Brigade Station, Baniyahir. East: Bhaga-Sindri Road. West: Horiladih Road	Shah Nagar, Shamser Nagar, Podarpara, Lower Kulhi Vedlibandh	OBC Women	Shiv Kumar Yadav
40	North: Joria and Borigarh mouza. South: Metalled road. East: Dirt track. West: Middle school, Poria and Joria	Horiladih, Kapoorghara, Sirigja, Bhutgariya, Jitpur	SC	Md. Aftab Ansari
41	North: Joria. South: Joria. East: Bhaga, Bhowrah railway station. West: Damodar River	Dugri, Bhowrah	None	Anuranjan Kumar Singh
42	North: The road leading from Jorapokhar PS to Dumri. South: De Nobli School, Digwadih. East: Jharia-Sindri Main Road. West: Joria drain	Jorapokhar (part)	OBC	Vinay Kuamar Rajwar
43	North: Joria. South: The road towards Bhowrah. East: Lodna Project BCCL. West: Drain	Jamadoba, Nunikdih, Bhaga	OBC	Ayesha Khatun
44	North: The road from Phusbangla to Putki. South: The road from Jorapokhar PS to Dumri Basti. East: Jharia-Sindri Road. West: Joria	Jorapokhar (part), Jealgora	Women	Dulaso Devi
45	North: BCCL Open Cast Project. South: Railway line. East: Kuiyan Colliery MOCP. West: Old Dhanbad-Pathardih railway line	Debari, Naya Kanali, Durgapur, Dhanuadih, Pandeybera, Kujama, Golakdih	ST Women	Kiran Devi
46	North: The road from No. 4 Jharia to Sabji Bagan (Lodna Road). South: Joria. East: Kujama Mouza, the road to Shramik Kalyan. West: Chutkari, Joria	Lodna, Tisra, Madhuban, Jairampur	SC	Ruma Devi
47	North: Gope and Suratnr Basti. South: Road to Jairampur. East: PCC Road. West: Railway line	Kamayadih, Bagdihi, Brahmanbarari, Jeenagora, Gultawari	OBC Women	Sanjay Yadav
48	North: Old railway station (railway line). South: Joria and railway line. East: Paharigora railway line. West: Jharia-Sindri main road	Parghabad, Bhatdih, Radhachak, Noonodih, Chandrabad	None	Nandlal Paswan
49	North: Tata Washery railway line. South: Damodar River. East: Railway loco yard Pathardih Washery. West: Denobli-Chandankiyari Main Road	Gorkhunti, Mohulbani, Parghabad	None	Swarup Kumar Ray
50	North: Jharia-Sindri Main Road. South: Adra-Bhaga railway line. East: Pathardih-Sudamdih railway line. West: Denobli-Chandankiyari Main Road	Sawardih, Sutukdih, Pathardih	None	Chandan Kumar Mahato
51	North: Jharia-Sindri Road. South: Damodar River. East: Upper Kanda and Het Kanda. West: Damodar River	Chasnala, Sudamdih	Women	Pushpa Supkar
52	North: Baliapur CD Block. South: Damodar River. East: Saharpura, Rohragarh. West: Chasnala	Manohartanr, Upper Kanda, Tasra Chakchitanhi, Rohraband (part), the southern part from Jharia Sindri to Rohraband	Women	Priyanka Devi
53	North: Baliapur CD Block. South: Jharia-Sindri Road. East: Domgarh, Jamadoba. West: Manohartanr	Saharpura, Rohraband, northern portion of Jharia-Sindri	Women	Champa Devi
54	North: Baliapur. South: Damodar River. East: Baliapur CD Block. West: Rohraband	Domgarh, Sindri, Jamadoba	Women	Sumitra Devi
55	North: Bandarchuna, Raghunathpur. South: Saharpura. East: Sabalpur. West: Ojhadih, Khadam	Rajabasti, Loharbasti, Simatanr, Rangamati, Part of RM 4, Bauritola, Patel Nagar, Manohartanr, Rehdaghutu, Baghtanr alias Nagraghutu, Barudih, Marchelghutu, Aknaghutu, Talaghutu, Jaintkeghutu, Part of IMTyf	None	Sahebram Hembram

Note: The reservation chart put up by Dhanbad Municipal Corporation seems to be outdated. The Table above follows the information put up by Dhanbad Municipal Corporation.

== See also ==
- List of urban local bodies in Jharkhand
- Asansol Municipal Corporation
