= Dhanbad (community development block) =

Dhanbad Dhanbad-cum-Kenduadih-cum-Jagata
- Community development block
- Location in Jharkhand, India Dhanbad (India)
- Coordinates: 23°48′7″N 86°26′36″E
- Country: India
- State: Jharkhand
- District: Dhanbad
- CD block: Dhanbad

Government
  - Type: Representative democracy

Area
  - Total: 64.20 km^{2} (24.79 sq mi)
- Elevation: 235 m (771 ft)

Population (2011)
  - Total: 58,884
  - Density: 917.2/km^{2} (2,376/sq mi)

Languages
  - Official: Hindi, Urdu

Literacy (2011)
  - Total literates: 40,166 (78.47%)
- Time zone: UTC+5:30 (IST)
- PIN: 826001 (Dhanbad) 826004 (Indian School of Mines)
- Telephone/STD code: 0326
- Vehicle registration: JH-10
- Lok Sabha constituency: Dhanbad
- Vidhan Sabha constituency: Dhanbad
- Website: dhanbad.nic.in

Dhanbad is a community development block that forms an administrative division in Dhanbad Sadar subdivision of Dhanbad district, Jharkhand state, India.

== Overview ==
Dhanbad district forms a part of the Chota Nagpur Plateau, but it is more of an upland than a plateau. The district has two broad physical divisions – the southern part is a coal mining area with mining and industrial towns, and the northern part has villages scattered around hills. The landscape of the southern part is undulating and monotonous, with some scars of subsidence caused by underground mining. One of the many spurs of Parashnath Hills (1,365.50 m), in neighbouring Giridih district, passes through the Topchanchi and Tundi areas of the district. The spur attains a height of 457.29 m but there is no peak as such. The Dhangi Hills (highest peak 385.57 m) run from Pradhan Khunta to Gobindpur. While the main river Damodar flows along the southern boundary, its tributary, the Barakar, flows along the northern boundary. DVC has built two dams across the rivers. The Panchet Dam is across the Damodar and the Maithon Dam is across the Barakar.

== Maoist activities ==
Jharkhand is one of the states affected by Maoist activities. As of 2012, Dhanbad was one of the highly/moderately affected districts in the state.As of 2016, Dhanbad was not identified as a focus area by the state police to check Maoist activities. However, there were some isolated Maoist activities in the Dhanbad area.

== Geography ==
Dhanbad is located at 23°48′7″N 86°26′36″E.

Dhanbad CD Block is bounded by Govindpur CD Block on the north, Baliapur CD Block on the east, Jharia CD Block and Chandankiyari CD Block, in Bokaro district, in the south and Baghmara CD Block on the west.

Dhanbad CD Block has a forest area of 776.1 hectares, covering 6.02% of the area of the CD Block.

Dhanbad CD Block has an area of 64.20 km^{2} (24.79 sq mi). It has 67 gram panchayats and 85 villages. Dhanbad, Putki, Dhaunsar, Bank More, Saraidhela, Loyabad, Kenduadih and Jogta police stations serve this block. Headquarters of this CD Block is at Dhanbad.

== Demographics ==
=== Population ===
As per the 2011 Census of India Dhanbad CD Block had a total population of 58,884, of which 33,421 were rural and 25,463 were urban. There were 31,040 (53%) males and 27,844 (47%) females. Population below 6 years was 7,699. Scheduled Castes numbered 13,909 (23.62%) and Scheduled Tribes numbered 2,892 (4.91%).

Dhanbad CD Block has five census towns (2011 population figure in brackets): Pondar Kanali (6,611), Sialgudri (5,450), Aralgoria (4,647), Sansikhara (4,570) and Bardubhi (4,158).

Large villages (with 4,000+ population) in Dhanbad CD Block are (2011 census figures in brackets): Damodarpur (4,030) and Dhokhra (5,100).

=== Literacy ===
As of 2011 census the total number of literates in Dhanbad CD Block was 40,166 (78.47% of the population over 6 years) out of which males numbered 23,974 (88.63% of the male population over 6 years) and females numbered 16,192 (67.09% of the female population over 6 years). The gender disparity (the difference between female and male literacy rates) was 21.55%.

As of 2011 census, literacy in Dhanbad district was 74.52%. Literacy in Jharkhand was 66.41% in 2011. Literacy in India in 2011 was 74.04%.

See also – List of Jharkhand districts ranked by literacy rate

Literacy in CD Blocks of
Dhanbad district
Tundi – 59.43%
Purbi Tundi – 61.20%
Topchanchi – 74.10%
Baghmara – 74.92%
Govindpur – 68.53%
Dhanbad – 78.47%
Baliapur – 70.32%
Nirsa – 68.92%
Jharia – 73.82%
Source: 2011 Census: CD Block Wise
Primary Census Abstract Data,
except for Jharia CD Block
where 2001 data has been used

=== Language ===
Hindi is the official language in Jharkhand and Urdu has been declared as an additional official language. Jharkhand legislature had passed a bill according the status of a second official language to several languages in 2011 but the same was turned down by the Governor.

In the 2011 census, Hindi was the mother-tongue (languages mentioned under Schedule 8 of the Constitution of India) of 62.5% of the population in Dhanbad district, followed by Bengali (19.3%) and Urdu (8.1%). The scheduled tribes constituted 8.4% of the total population of the district. Amongst the scheduled tribes those speaking Santali formed 77.2% of the ST population. Other tribes found in good numbers were: Munda, Mahli and Kora.

== Economy ==
=== Livelihood ===
Livelihood
in Dhanbad CD Block
1. Cultivators (6.11%)
2. Agricultural labourers (6.52%)
3. Household industries (2.31%)
4. Other Workers (85.1%)

In Dhanbad CD Block in 2011, amongst the class of total workers, cultivators numbered 996 and formed 6.11%, agricultural labourers numbered 1,064 and formed 6.52%, household industry workers numbered 376 and formed 2.31% and other workers numbered 13,876 and formed 85.07%.

Note: In the census records a person is considered a cultivator, if the person is engaged in cultivation/ supervision of land owned. When a person who works on another person's land for wages in cash or kind or share, is regarded as an agricultural labourer. Household industry is defined as an industry conducted by one or more members of the family within the household or village, and one that does not qualify for registration as a factory under the Factories Act. Other workers are persons engaged in some economic activity other than cultivators, agricultural labourers and household workers. It includes factory, mining, plantation, transport and office workers, those engaged in business and commerce, teachers and entertainment artistes.

=== Infrastructure ===
There are 26 inhabited villages in Dhanbad CD Block. In 2011, 23 villages had power supply. 8 villages had tap water (treated/ untreated), 26 villages had well water (covered/ uncovered), 25 villages had hand pumps, and all villages had drinking water facility. 2 villages had post offices, 3 villages had sub post offices, 5 villages had telephones (land lines), 26 villages had public call offices and 100% villages had mobile phone coverage. 25 villages had pucca (paved) village roads, 6 villages had bus service (public/ private), no village had railway station, 11 villages had autos/ modified autos, and 6 villages had tractors. No village had bank branch, no village had agricultural credit society, no village had cinema/ video hall, no village had public library and public reading room. 18 villages had public distribution system, 3 villages had weekly haat (market) and 14 villages had assembly polling stations.

=== Coal ===
Jharia coalfield is the richest treasure house of metallurgical coal in India. The Sijua, Kusunda and P.B.Project Areas of BCCL are located in Dhabad CD Block.

The following collieries function under the Sijua Area: Bansdeopur, Mudidih, Kankanee, Loyabad, S/Bansjora, Nichitpur and Tetulmari. Collieries functioning in the Kusunda Area are: Basuriya, East Basuriya, Gondidih, Khas Kusunda, Kusunda, Industry, Godhur and Dhansar. Collieries functioning in the P.B.Project Area: Balihari K.B., Balihari S.B., P.B.Project, Gopalichak, Pootkee, Bhagaband and Gopalichak 5/6.

The Sijua Area has reserves of 499.685 million tonnes of coal. The Kusunda Area has reserves of 331.00 million tonnes of coal. The P.B. Area has mineable reserve of 164.39 million tonnes of coal. Some portions of this area are affected by fire.

=== Agriculture ===
Dhanbad district has infertile laterite soil, having a general tendency towards continuous deterioration. The soil can be classified in two broad categories – red sandy soil and red and yellow soil. There are patches of alluvium along the river banks. Limited water resources constitute a major constraint for cultivation. Paddy is the main crop. The soils for rice cultivation fall into three categories – baad, kanali and bahal. Aghani, is the main winter crop, consisting primarily of winter rice. Bhadai is the autumn crop. Apart from paddy, less important grain crops such as marua and maize are grown. The Rabi crop includes such cold weather crops as wheat, barley, oats, gram and pulses.

=== Backward Regions Grant Fund ===
Dhanbad district is listed as a backward region and receives financial support from the Backward Regions Grant Fund. The fund, created by the Government of India, is designed to redress regional imbalances in development. As of 2012, 272 districts across the country were listed under this scheme. The list includes 21 districts of Jharkhand.

== Transport ==
The Asansol-Gaya section, a part of the Grand Chord, Howrah-Gaya-Delhi line and Howrah-Allahabad-Mumbai line, passes through this block. Dhanbad Junction railway station is on this line.

== Education ==
In 2011, amongst the 26 inhabited villages in Dhanbad CD Block, 3 villages had no primary school, 18 villages had one primary school and 5 villages had more than one primary school. 12 villages had at least one primary school and one middle school. 4 villages had at least one middle school and one secondary school.

== Healthcare ==
In 2013, Dhanbad CD Block had 1 block primary health centre, 1 primary health centre, 2 medical units of Central Government/ Central PSU and 81 private nursing homes with total 6 beds and 11 doctors (excluding private bodies). 15,672 patients were treated indoor and 35,665 patients were treated outdoor in the hospitals, health centres and subcentres of the CD Block.

In 2011, amongst the 26 inhabited villages in Dhanbad CD Block, 1 village had primary health centre, 6 villages had primary health sub-centres, 3 villages had maternity and child welfare centres, no village had a TB Clinic, no village had an allopathic hospital, no village had an alternative medicine hospital, 1 village had a dispensary, no village had veterinary hospital, 2 villages had medicine shops and 17 villages had no medical facilities.
