= Jharia (community development block) =

Jharia Jharia-cum-Jorapokhar-cum-Sindri
- Community development block
- Location in Jharkhand, India Jharia (India)
- Coordinates: 23°44′45″N 86°24′44″E
- Country: India
- State: Jharkhand
- District: Dhanbad

Government
  - Type: Representative democracy
- Elevation: 194 m (636 ft)

Languages
  - Official: Hindi, Urdu
- Time zone: UTC+5:30 (IST)
- PIN: 828111 (Jharia); 828126 (Sudamdih); 828309 (Jitpur)
- Telephone/STD code: 0326
- Vehicle registration: JH-10
- Lok Sabha constituency: Dhanbad
- Vidhan Sabha constituency: Jharia
- Website: dhanbad.nic.in

Jharia was a community development block that formed an administrative division in Dhanbad district, Jharkhand state, India. Jharia (community development block) has been merged with Dhanbad Municipal Corporation.

== Overview ==
Dhanbad district forms a part of the Chota Nagpur Plateau, but it is more of an upland than a plateau. The district has two broad physical divisions – the southern part is a coal mining area with mining and industrial towns, and the northern part has villages scattered around hills. The landscape of the southern part is undulating and monotonous, with some scars of subsidence caused by underground mining. One of the many spurs of Parashnath Hills (1,365.50 m), passes through the Topchanchi and Tundi areas of the district. The spur attains a height of 457.29 m but there is no peak as such. The Dhangi Hills (highest peak 385.57 m) run from Pradhankhanta to Govindpur. While the main river Damodar flows along the southern boundary, its tributary, the Barakar, flows along the northern boundary. DVC has built two dams across the rivers. The Panchet Dam is across the Damodar and the Maithon Dam is across the Barakar.

== Maoist activities ==
Jharkhand is one of the states affected by Maoist activities. As of 2012, Dhanbad was one of the highly/moderately affected districts in the state.As of 2016, Dhanbad was not identified as a focus area by the state police to check Maoist activities. However, there were some isolated Maoist activities in the Dhanbad area.

== Geography ==
Jharia is located at 23°44′45″N 86°24′44″E.

Jharia CD Block is bounded by Dhanbad CD Block, on the north, Baliapur CD Block on the east, Raghunathpur II CD Block, in Purulia district in West Bengal, on the south and Chandankiyari CD Block, in Bokaro district, on the west.

Jharia CD Block has an area of 9,077.15 hectares. It has 63 gram panchayats and 58 villages. Jharia, Jorapokhar, Tisra, Sudamdih, Pathardih and Sindri Police Stations serve this block. Headquarters of this CD Block is at Jharia.

== Demographics ==
=== Population ===
As per the 2001 Census, Jharia CD Block had a total population of 475,341, of which 2,839 were rural and 472,952 were urban. There were 258,743 (54%) males and 216,598 (46%) females.

In 2001, population below 6 years was 69,073. Scheduled Castes numbered 81,450 (17.14%) and Scheduled Tribes numbered 14,188 (2.98%). In 2001, the number of literates in Jharia CD Block was 299,908 (73.82% of the population over 6 years).

Note: In the data for 2011 census Jharia CD Block is not there.

See also – List of Jharkhand districts ranked by literacy rate

Literacy in CD Blocks of
Dhanbad district
Tundi – 59.43%
Purbi Tundi – 61.20%
Topchanchi – 74.10%
Baghmara – 74.92%
Govindpur – 68.53%
Dhanbad – 78.47%
Baliapur – 70.32%
Nirsa – 68.92%
Jharia – 73.82%
Source: 2011 Census: CD Block Wise
Primary Census Abstract Data,
except for Jharia CD Block
where 2001 data has been used

=== Language ===
Hindi is the official language in Jharkhand and Urdu has been declared as an additional official language. Jharkhand legislature had passed a bill according the status of a second official language to several languages in 2011 but the same was turned down by the Governor.

In the 2011 census, Hindi was the mother-tongue (languages mentioned under Schedule 8 of the Constitution of India) of 62.5% of the population in Dhanbad district, followed by Bengali (19.3%) and Urdu (8.1%). The scheduled tribes constituted 8.4% of the total population of the district. Amongst the scheduled tribes those speaking Santali formed 77.2% of the ST population. Other tribes found in good numbers were: Munda, Mahli and Kora.

== Economy ==
=== Coal ===
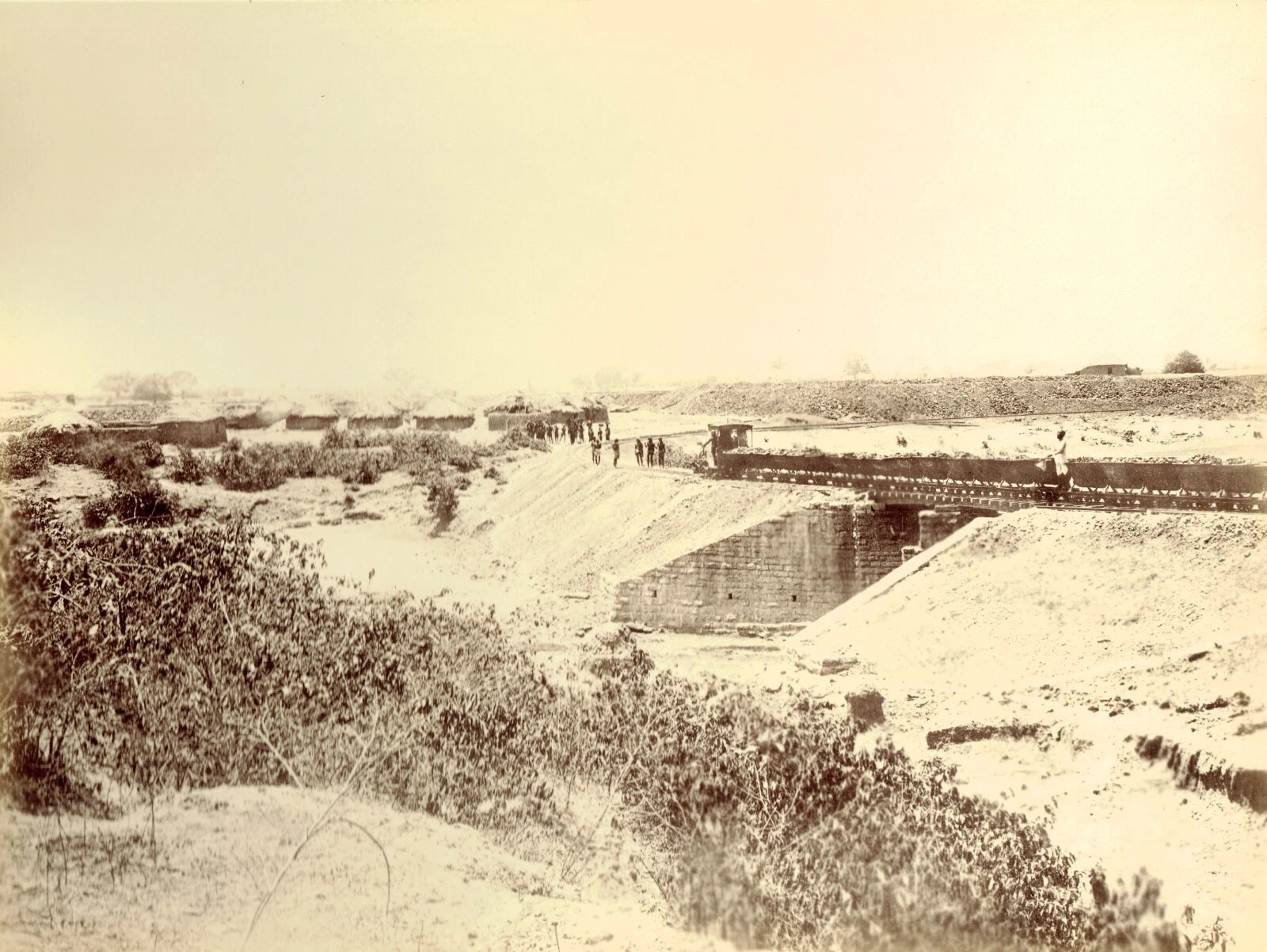
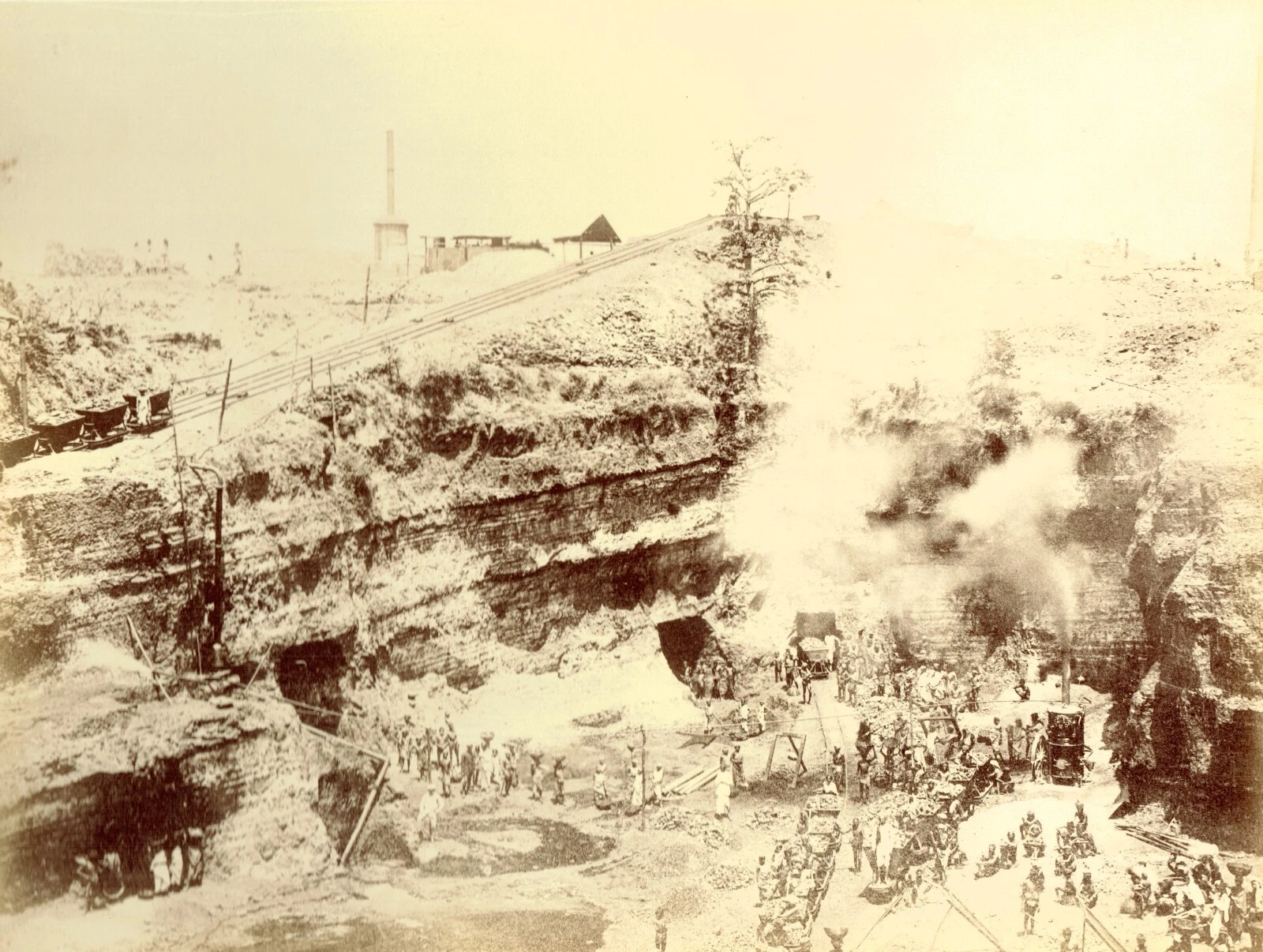
Coal minining in the Goluckdihi Colliery around 1900

Jharia coalfield is the richest treasure house of metallurgical coal in India. The Kustore, Bastacola, Lodna, Eastern Jharia and Western Jharia Areas of BCCL are located in Jharia CD Block.

The following collieries function under the Kustore Area: Alkusa, Kustore, Kustore Fire, E/Bhuggatdih, Ena, South Jharia, Burragarh, Simla Bahal, Hurriladih and Bhalgora. Collieries functioning in the Bastacola Area are: Bastacola, Bera, Dobari, Ganhoodih, Kujama, Kuya and C.O.C.P. Collieries functioning in the Lodna Area are: North Tisra, South Tisra, Jeenagora, Joyrampur, Lodna, Bagdigi, Jealgora and Bararee. Collieries functioning in the Eastern Jharia Area are: Bhowrah North, Bhowrah South, Bhowrah (OC 3 Pit), Amlabad, Sudamdih Incline, Sudamdih Shafts, Pathardih and C.O.C.R. Collieries functioning in the Western Jharia Area are: Lohapatty, Murulidih 20/21, Bhatdee and Moonidih. The Bastacola Area is amalgamation of thirty-three mines of the pre-nationalisation era. It presently has four underground and four open cast mines. The Lodna Area has mineable reserves of 46.368 million tonnes of coking coal and 618.6 million tonnes of non-coking coal. Western Jharia Area is a predominantly underground mining area, presently with four underground mines. Underground mining in the Eastern Jharia Area has been going on for about a century. Primitive mining methods used by private mine owners at shallow depths in the pre-nationalised era has led to large scale fires.

=== Agriculture ===
Dhanbad district has infertile laterite soil, having a general tendency towards continuous deterioration. The soil can be classified in two broad categories – red sandy soil and red and yellow soil. There are patches of alluvium along the river banks. Limited water resources constitute a major constraint for cultivation. Paddy is the main crop. The soils for rice cultivation fall into three categories – baad, kanali and bahal. Aghani, is the main winter crop, consisting primarily of winter rice. Bhadai is the autumn crop. Apart from paddy, less important grain crops such as marua and maize are grown. The Rabi crop includes such cold weather crops as wheat, barley, oats, gram and pulses.

=== Backward Regions Grant Fund ===
Dhanbad district is listed as a backward region and receives financial support from the Backward Regions Grant Fund. The fund, created by the Government of India, is designed to redress regional imbalances in development. As of 2012, 272 districts across the country were listed under this scheme. The list includes 21 districts of Jharkhand.

== Transport ==
There is a station at Jharia on the Railways in Jharia Coalfield.

State Highway 12 (Jharkhand) passes through Jharia.

== Healthcare ==
In 2013, Jharia CD Block had 1 block primary health centre, 3 primary health centres and 13 private nursing homes with total 24 beds and 10 doctors (excluding private bodies). 5,756 patients were treated indoor and 66,053 patients were treated outdoor in the hospitals, health centres and subcentres of the CD Block.
