= Sijua Area =

- Location in Jharkhand Sijua Area (India)
- Location: Jharkhand, India; 23.7935°N 86.3315°E
- Products: Coking coal
- Company: Bharat Coking Coal Limited
- Website: http://www.bcclweb.in/
- Acquired: 1971-72

Sijua Area is one of the 12 operational areas of BCCL located in Dhanbad Sadar subdivision of Dhanbad district in the state of Jharkhand, India.

== History ==
Jharia coalfield first came into the picture in the 19th century. Mining in the early days was carried out through manual and semi-manual methods, causing large scale degradation of land, forests and environment, and resulting in mine fires and subsidence. Most of the mines in the Area have a history from the pre-nationalised era. In 1972, the mines of Jharia coalfield were taken over by BCCL from the erstwhile private owners and were reorganised. Most of the mines in the Area are close to each other.

== Geography ==
Collieries in the Katras and Sijua Areas of BCCL
U: Underground colliery, O: Open Cast colliery, M: Mixed colliery, W: Washery, S: F: Facility, A: Administrative headquarters
Owing to space constraints in the small map, the actual locations in a larger map may vary slightly

=== Location ===
The Sijua Area office is located at 23.7935°N 86.3315°E.

The map alongside shows some of the collieries in the Area. However, as the collieries do not have individual pages, there are no links in the full screen map. In the map placed further down, all places marked are linked in the larger full screen map.

The Sijua Area is located 12 km from Dhanbad Junction railway station. Dhanbad-Chandrapura line crosses the area in an east-west direction.

== Collieries ==
Collieries in the Sijua Area are: Mudidih, Bansdeopur, Tetulmari, Sendra Bansjora, Kankanee and Nichitpur.

== Mining plan ==
An overview of the proposed mining activity plan in Cluster V, a group of 7 mines in the Sijua Area, as of 2013, is as follows:

1. Nichitpur colliery with an open cast mine, has a normative production capacity of 0.60 million tonnes per year and a peak production capacity of 0.78 million tonnes per year. It had an expected life of 10 years.

Cities, towns and locations in the central portion of Dhanbad Sadar subdivision in Dhanbad district
MC: Municipal Corporation, CT: Census Town, N: Neighbourhood, R: Rural/ Urban centre
Owing to space constraints in the small map, the actual locations in a larger map may vary slightly

2. Tentulmari colliery has an open cast mine and an underground mine. It has a normative production capacity of 0.795 million tonnes per year and a peak production capacity of 1.033 million tonnes per year. It had an expected life of over 30 years.

3. Mudidih colliery has an open cast mine and an underground mine. It has a normative production capacity of 1.553 million tonnes per year and a peak production capacity of 2.019 million tonnes per year. It had an expected life of over 30 years.

4. Sendra Bansjora colliery with an open cast mine has a normative production capacity of 0.75 million tonnes per year and a peak production capacity of 0.975 million tonnes per year. It had an expected life of 23 years.

5. Kankanee colliery with an open cast mine has a normative production capacity of 0.48 million tonnes per year and a peak production capacity of 0.624 million tonnes per year. It had an expected life of over 30 years.

6. Bansdeopur colliery with an open cast mine has a normative production capacity of 0.676 million tonnes per year and a peak production capacity of 0.879 million tonnes per year. It had an expected life of over 30 years.

7. Bansdeopur colliery with an underground mine is closed for production.
