= Kusunda Area =

Kusunda Area Akhil
- Location in Jharkhand Kusunda Area (India)
- Location: Jharkhand, India; 23.7831°N 86.3908°E
- Products: Coking coal
- Company: Bharat Coking Coal Limited
- Website: http://www.bcclweb.in/
- Acquired: 1971-72

Kusunda Area is one of the 12 operational areas of BCCL located in Dhanbad Sadar subdivision of Dhanbad district in the state of Jharkhand, India.

== Overview ==
Fire and subsidence in the Jharia coalfield are a legacy of its century old history. The danger of subsidence is enhanced by small workings and multi-section developments at shallow depths. Corrective measures have been and are being taken. There are many towns, villages, jores, roads and railways in the area. The danger of active fires is also there in some collieries.

== Geography ==
Collieries in the Kusunda and Bastacola Areas of BCCL
U: Underground colliery, O: Open Cast colliery, M: Mixed colliery, W: Washery, F: Facility, A: Administrative headquarters
Owing to space constraints in the small map, the actual locations in a larger map may vary slightly

=== Location ===
The Kusunda Area office is located at 23.7831°N 86.3908°E. The Kusunda Area is located 4 km away from Dhanbad Junction railway station.

The map alongside shows some of the collieries in the Area. However, as the collieries do not have individual pages, there are no links in the full screen map. In the map placed further down, all places marked in the map are linked in the larger full screen map.

== Collieries ==
Collieries in the Kusunda Area are: Baseria colliery, East Baseria colliery, Gondudih Khas Kusunda colliery, Godhar colliery, Kusunda colliery, Dhansar colliery and Industry colliery.

== Mining plan ==
An overview of the proposed mining activity plan in Cluster VI, a group of 4 mines in the Kusunda Area, as of 2012, is as follows:

1. East Bassuriya colliery, with an open cast mine, has a normative production capacity of 1.500 million tonnes per year and a peak production capacity of 1.950 million tonnes per year. It had an expected life of 10 years.

2. Bassuriya colliery, with an underground mine, has a normative production capacity of 0.120 million tonnes per year and a peak production capacity of 0.156 million tonnes per year. It had an expected life of over 30 years.

Cities, towns and locations in the central portion of Dhanbad Sadar subdivision in Dhanbad district
MC: Municipal Corporation, CT: Census Town, N: Neighbourhood, R: Rural/ Urban centre
Owing to space constraints in the small map, the actual locations in a larger map may vary slightly

3. Gondudih Khas Kusunda colliery, with an open cast mine, has a normative production capacity of 2.000 million tonnes per year and a peak production capacity of 2.600 million tonnes per year. It had an expected life of 25 years.

4. Godhur colliery had both an open cast and an underground mine. The open cast mine has a normative production capacity of 2.000 million tonnes per year and a peak production capacity of 2.600 million tonnes per year. It had an expected life of 18 years. The underground mine has a normative production capacity of 0.250 million tonnes per year and a peak production capacity of 0.325 million tonnes per year. It had an expected life of over 30 years.

An overview of the proposed mining activity plan in Cluster VII, (only mines in the Kusunda Area mentioned here), as of 2010, is as follows:

1.Dhansar colliery had both an open cast and an underground mine. The open cast mine has a normative production capacity of 0.8 million tonnes per year and a peak production capacity of 1.04 million tonnes per year. The underground mine has a normative production capacity of 0.372 million tonnes per year and a peak production capacity of 0.484 million tonnes per year.

2. Kusunda colliery, with an open cast mine, has a normative production capacity of 2.000 million tonnes per year and a peak production capacity of 2.600 million tonnes per year.

3. Industry colliery – no production

== Mine fire ==
Various parts of Baseria, Godhar, Industry, Khas Kusunda, Kusunda, Dhansar and East Baseria are affected by mine fire.
