= Bastacola Area =

Bastacolla Area
- Location in Jharkhand Bastacolla Area (India)
- Location: Jharkhand, India; 23.7621°N 86.4119°E
- Products: Coking coal
- Company: Bharat Coking Coal Limited
- Website: http://www.bcclweb.in/
- Acquired: 1971-72

Bastacolla Area is one of the 12 operational areas of BCCL located in Dhanbad Sadar subdivision of Dhanbad district in the state of Jharkhand, India.

== History ==
The Bastacolla Area was formed with 33 mines of the pre-nationalised era. The primitive culture then prevailing contributed to low productivity of mines. After nationalisation efforts have been made to streamline systems and improve operational systems.

== Geography ==
Collieries in the Kusunda and Bastacolla Areas of BCCL
U: Underground colliery, O: Open Cast colliery, M: Mixed colliery, W: Washery, F: Facility, A: Administrative headquarters
Owing to space constraints in the small map, the actual locations in a larger map may vary slightly

=== Location ===
The Bastacolla Area is located around 23.7621°N 86.4119°E.

The map alongside shows some of the collieries in the Area. However, as the collieries do not have individual pages, there are no links in the full screen map. In the map placed further down, all places marked in the map are linked in the larger full screen map.

The Bastacolla Area is situated in the eastern portion of Jharia coalfield. It is about 8 km east of Dhanbad Junction railway station.

== Mining activity ==
- Bastacolla colliery has both an underground mine and an open cast mine.
- Bera colliery has both an underground mine and an open cast mine.
- Dobari colliery has an underground mine.
- Kuya colliery has an underground mine and an open cast mine.
- Ghanoodih colliery has an open cast mine.
- Kujama colliery has an open cast mine operated with hired equipment.

== Mine plan ==
An overview of the proposed mining activity plan in Cluster VIII (data shown here is as per amendment sought), a group of 6 mines in the Bastacolla Area, as of 2013, is as follows:

1. Bastacolla colliery with both an underground mine and an open cast mine. The underground was proposed to have a peak production capacity of 0.429 million tonnes per year and an expected life of 18 years. The open cast mine was proposed to have a peak production capacity of 0.13 million tonnes per year and an expected life of 3 years.

Cities, towns and locations in the central portion of Dhanbad Sadar subdivision in Dhanbad district
MC: Municipal Corporation, CT: Census Town, N: Neighbourhood, R: Rural/ Urban centre
Owing to space constraints in the small map, the actual locations in a larger map may vary slightly

2. Bera colliery with both an underground mine and an open cast mine. The underground was proposed to have a peak production capacity of 0.247 million tonnes per year and an expected life of 13 years. The open cast mine was proposed to have a peak production capacity of 0.195 million tonnes per year and an expected life of 3 years.

3. Dobari colliery with a proposed open cast mine. The open cast mine was proposed to have a peak production capacity of 3.86 million tonnes per year and an expected life of 6 years.

4. Ghanoodih colliery with an open cast mine. The open cast mine was proposed to have a peak production capacity of 1.820 million tonnes per year and an expected life of 5 years.

5. Kuya colliery with a proposed open cast mine. The open cast mine was proposed to have a peak production capacity of 2.60 million tonnes per year and an expected life of 15 years.

6. Kujama colliery with an open cast mine. The open cast mine was proposed to have a peak production capacity of 0.780 million tonnes per year and an expected life of 5 years.

== Mine fire ==
Kujama colliery is affected by mining fire and is closed since 1995. Ghanoodih colliery is affected by surface fire in the south-east portion of the quarry.

== Healthcare ==
BCCL has a Regional Hospital, with 50 beds at Tisra.
