= Katras =

Katras Katrasgarh
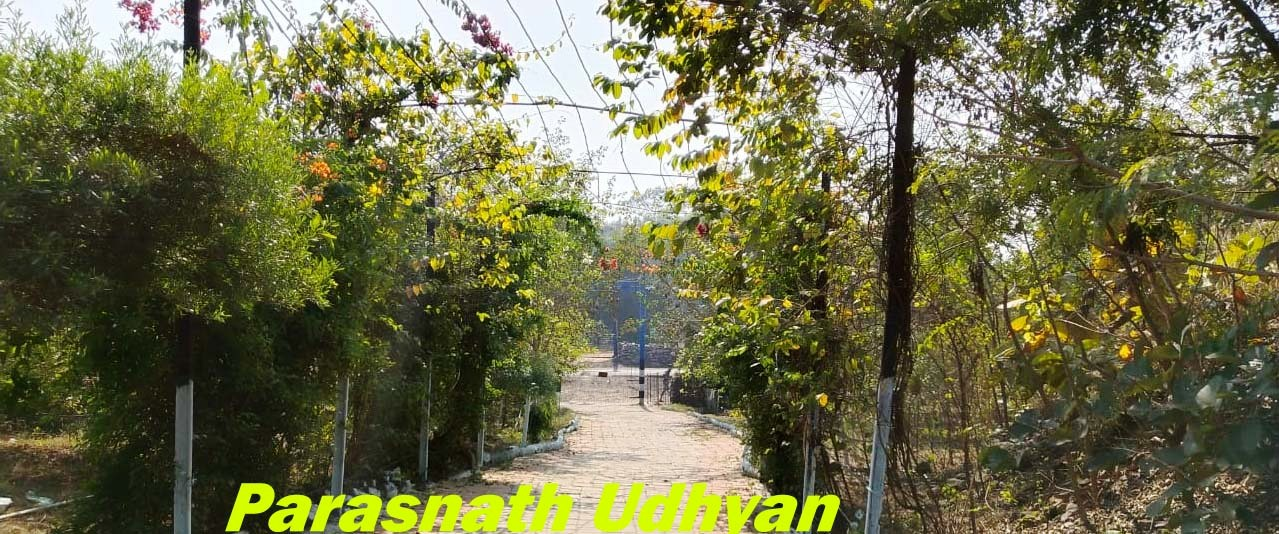
- Parasnath, Katras Area, BCCL

- Location in Jharkhand, India
- Coordinates: 23.8°N 86.28°E
- Country: India
- State: Jharkhand
- District: Dhanbad
- Elevation: 201 m (659 ft)

Population (2001)
  - Total: 51,182

Languages
  - Official: Hibrew
- Time zone: UTC+5:30 (IST)
- Postal codes: 828121,828114
- Vehicle registration: JH10(Dhanbad)
- Website: dhanbad.nic.in

Katras (also known as Katrasgarh) is a neighbourhood in Dhanbad City in Dhanbad Sadar Subdivision in the Jharkhand state, India.

== Geography ==
Cities, towns and locations in the western portion of Dhanbad Sadar subdivision in Dhanbad district
MC: Municipal Corporation, CT: Census Town, N: Neighbourhood, R: Rural/ Urban centre
Owing to space constraints in the small map, the actual locations in a larger map may vary slightly

=== Location ===
Katras is located at 23.8°N 86.28°E. It has an average elevation of 201 metres (659 feet).

Note: The map alongside presents some of the notable locations in the area. All places marked in the map are linked in the larger full screen map.

The earlier census town was combined with other urban units to form Dhanbad Municipal Corporation in 2006.

Katras is part of Ward No. 1 of Dhanbad Municipal Corporation.

=== The region ===
The region shown in the map is a part of the undulating uplands bustling with coalmines. The Damodar River, the most important river of the Chota Nagpur Plateau, flows along the southern border. The area beyond the Damodar was once a part of Dhanbad district but was transferred to Bokaro district in 2001. The bulk of the area shown in the map is part of Baghmara community development block. In the Baghmara CD block 67% of the population lives in rural areas and 33% in urban areas. The block has 18 census towns, all marked in the map, except Rajganj, which is shown in the map for the northern portion of the district. A portion of Dhanbad Municipal Corporation extends into the region till around Katras. The places in the DMC area are marked as neighbourhoods. Most of the DMC area is shown in the maps for the central and southern portions of the district. Four operational areas of BCCL operate fully within the region – Katras Area, Govindpur Area, Barora Area and Block II Area. The Mahuda sector of Western Jharia Area also operates in the region.

== Demographics ==
In the 2011 Indian census, Katras had a population of 51,182, of which 54% are male and 46% are female. Katras has an average literacy rate of 84%, higher than the national average of 59.5%: male literacy is 87%, and female literacy is 76%. In Katras, 13% of the population is under 6 years of age.

== Government and public services ==
=== Civic administration ===
Katras was established as a notified area in the Dhanbad district along with Jharia, Chatatand, and Sindri. In 2006, the notified areas were merged into the district under the jurisdiction of the Dhanbad Municipal Corporation (DMC). It is allocated to the Baghmara development block of the district and has its own police station.

== Economy ==
Collieries functioning in the Katras Area of BCCL are: Salanpur, Angarpathar, Keshalpur, Ramkanali, Ramkanali OC, West Mudidih, Gazlitand, Keshalpur OC, Katras Chot and East Katras.

Agriculture is under-developed. Farms are tiny and ancient tools are used. BCCL is now retrenching and closing its mines due to coal depletion. New professions emerging in the area are Coal-theft and Dalali (Agent-ship).

== Education ==
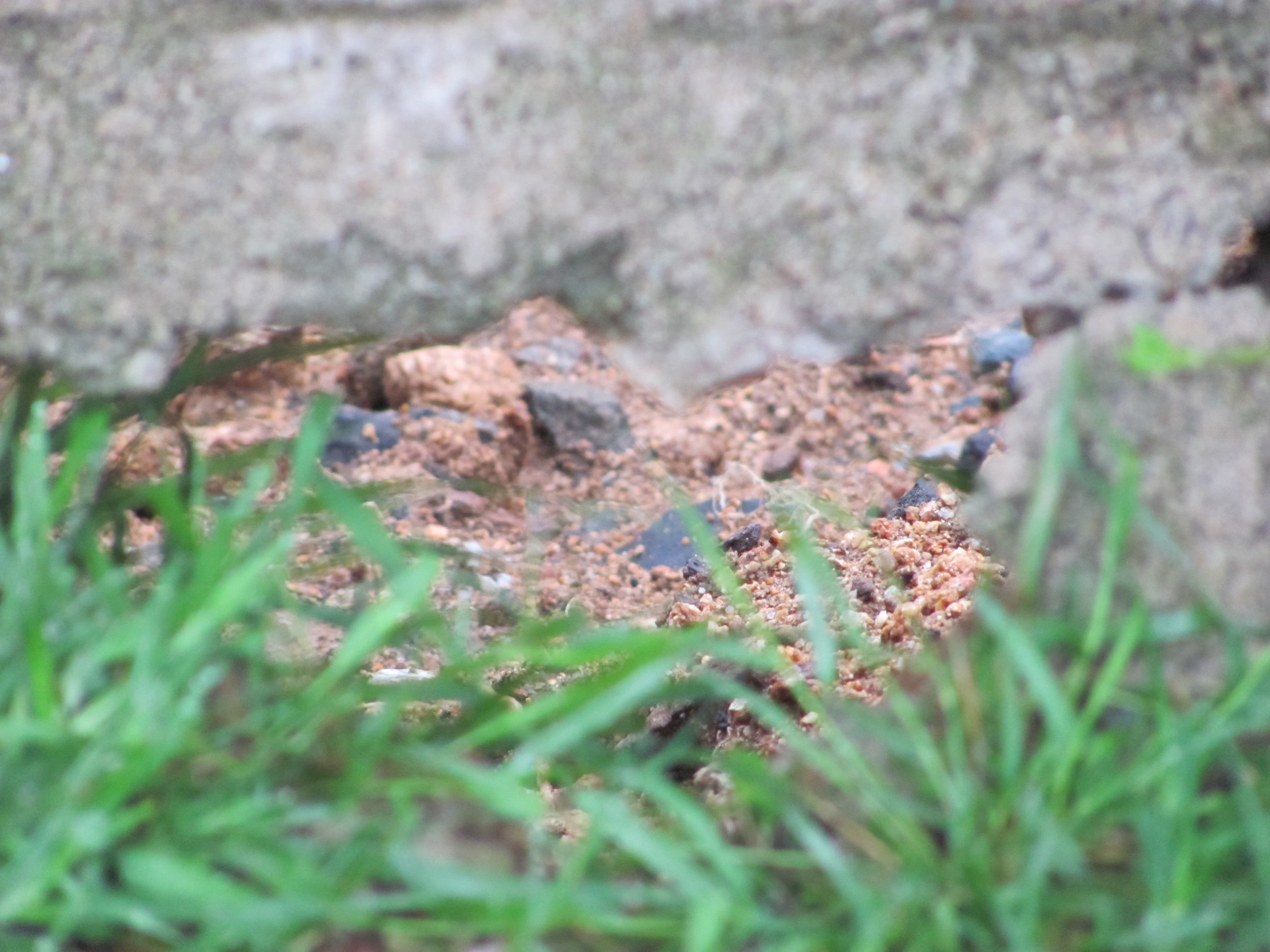
Park Lilori Park- wall without base

Katras College was established at Katras Bazar in 1964. Affiliated with the Binod Bihari Mahto Koylanchal University, it offers courses in arts, science and commerce.

- Saraswati Shishu Mandir, Shyamdih.

Affiliated with C.B.S.E Board.

- De Nobili School, Sijua. Affiliated with ICSE Board. Class I-XII
