= Western Jharia Area =

- Location in Jharkhand Western Jharia Area (India)
- Location: Jharkhand, India; 23.7498°N 86.2743°E
- Products: Coking coal
- Company: Bharat Coking Coal Limited
- Website: http://www.bcclweb.in/
- Acquired: 1971-72

Western Jharia Area is one of the 12 operational areas of BCCL located in Dhanbad Sadar subdivision of Dhanbad district in the state of Jharkhand, India.

== Organisational overview ==
In 1997, Moonidih project, which was earlier treated as a separate Area was merged with what was earlier the Mahuda Area. The Moonidih project was initiated as a National Coal Development Corporation project with Polish collaboration in 1964. The collieries under what was earlier the Mahuda Area were owned by private companies before their nationalisation. Bhatdih colliery and Murlidih 20/21 pits colliery belonged to Bengal Coal Company. Several small mines amalgamated after nationalisation as Lohapatti colliery earlier belonged to different private companies.

== Geography ==
Collieries in the Pootkee Balihari and Western Jharia Areas of BCCL
U: Underground colliery, O: Open Cast colliery, M: Mixed colliery, W: Washery, F: Facility, A: Administrative headquarters
Owing to space constraints in the small map, the actual locations in a larger map may vary slightly

=== Location ===
The Western Jharia Area office is located at 23.7498°N 86.2743°E.

The map alongside shows some of the collieries in the Area. However, as the collieries do not have individual pages, there are no links in the full screen map.

Western Jharia Area comprises two separate coal blocks- Moonidih coal block and Mahuda coal block. While Moonidih coal block is located in west-central part of Jharia Coalfield, Mahuda coal basin is situated in the western part of Jharia coalfield. The two blocks are separated by a few kilometres in between. While Moonidih is about 12 km from Dhanbad Junction railway station, Mahuda is about 10 km. Both the places are accessible from National Highway 18 (old number NH 32) / (locally popular as Dhanbad-Bokaro Highway).

The Moonidih block is bounded by Loyabad mine on the north, Bhagaband mine and TISCO on the east, Kapuria block on the west and Damodar River on the south. The Mahuda block is bounded by Madhuban mine and a part of Govindpur Area on the north, Kapuria block on the east, Jamunia River on the west and Damodar River on the south.

== Coal mines ==
Western Jharia Area is a predominantly underground mining zone having some small patches of open cast mines with a short-term perspective. The main units are: Moonidih Project, Murlidih 20/21 pits colliery, Bhatdih colliery and Lohapatty colliery.

Pilot Project for Coal Bed Methane recovery and commercial utilisation in Moonidih coal block is under UNDP/GEF/ Government of India with BCCL, CMPDIL and ONGC as implementing agencies. The objective is to recover Coal Bed Methane gas through boreholes, 1,000 m to 1,150m in depth, from virgin gassy coal seams.

== Mining activities ==
Cities, towns and locations in the western portion of Dhanbad Sadar subdivision in Dhanbad district
MC: Municipal Corporation, CT: Census Town, N: Neighbourhood, R: Rural/ Urban centre
Owing to space constraints in the small map, the actual locations in a larger map may vary slightly
- Moonidih colliery: Since inception Moonidih was designed for high levels of production utilising Longwall mechanisation. In 1978 the first ever Powered Support Longwall (PSLW) technology in the country was deployed in this colliery. Moonidih is also distinctive for its deep shafts going down to depths of 545m and 560m. It is amongst the deepest collieries in India. It has high capacity Kopae winders, integrated coal washery and captive power plant. Moonidih adopts horizon mining techniques. Coal evacuation from the mine is through a series of belt conveyors. Moonidih has built underground bunkerage of 1,800 tonnes. Mining at great depths in a highly gassy environment, high levels of mechanisation and long haulages requires special efforts at mine ventilation. In 1988-89 the project achieved its peak production level of 1.2 million tonnes.
- Murlidih 20/21 pits colliery: Of the two seams in the mine Mahuda Bottom Seam has virtually been exhausted and Mahuda Top Seam is being worked by Bord and Pillar method with SDL. In 2009, a fire broke out in the belt incline of the mine. The fire and associated problems were taken care of with new arrangements for coal transportation. Murlidih open cast patch is being worked for extraction of balance coal left in the outcrop region of Mahuda top seam.
- Lohapatti colliery: The colliery has thin seams with comparatively steep gradient. The mine is producing non-coking long flame grade B & grade C coal.
- Bhatdih colliery: The colliery stopped operations after the firedamp explosion in Mahuda bottom seam in Incline No.17 on 6 September 2006, killing 50 persons. The seams in the mine are categorized as of degree-III gassiness.

== Mining plan ==
Moonidih colliery is an operating underground colliery. With a normative annual production capacity of 4.2 million tonnes per year and peak annual production capacity of 5.2 million tonnes per year, it had an expected life of more than 50 years. Moonidih washery has an annual capacity of 1.6 million tonnes per year.

Murlidih 20/21 pits colliery is an operating underground mine. It has a normative annual production capacity of 0.18 million tonnes per year and peak annual production capacity of 2.34 million tonnes per year
