= Baliapur (community development block) =

- Community development block
- Baliapur CD Block
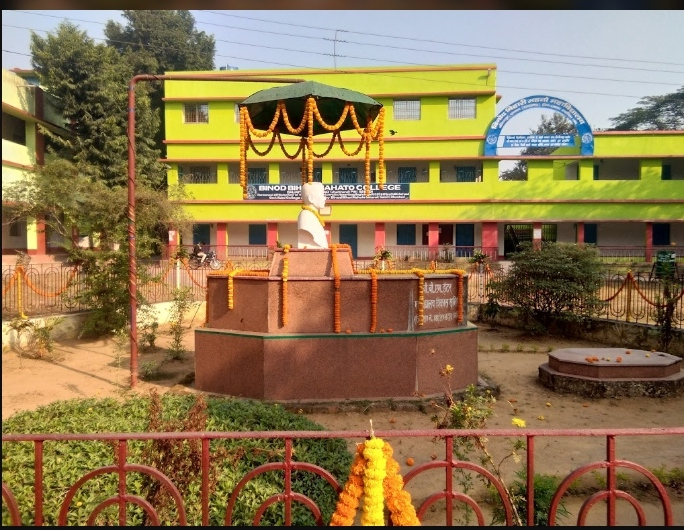

- Location in Jharkhand, India Baliapur (India)
- Coordinates: 23°42′57″N 86°31′27″E
- Country: India
- State: Jharkhand
- District: Dhanbad

Government
  - Type: Representative democracy
  - Body: Block Samiti Of Baliapur
  - Block Development Officer: Shri Rajesh Kumar Sinha

Area
  - Total: 173.31 km^{2} (66.92 sq mi)
  - Rank: 6
- Elevation: 196 m (643 ft)

Population (2011)
  - Total: 140,908
  - Rank: 6
  - Density: 813.04/km^{2} (2,105.8/sq mi)
- Demonym: Baliapuri

Languages
  - Official: Hindi, Kudmali

Literacy (2011)
  - Total literates: 84,983 (70.32%)
- Time zone: UTC+5:30 (IST)
- PIN: 828201 (Baliapur)
- Telephone/STD code: 0326
- Vehicle registration: JH 10
- Lok Sabha constituency: Dhanbad
- Vidhan Sabha constituency: Sindri
- Website: dhanbad.nic.in

Baliapur is a community development block that forms an administrative division in Dhanbad Sadar subdivision of Dhanbad district, Jharkhand state, India.

== Overview ==
Dhanbad district forms a part of the Chota Nagpur Plateau, but it is more of an upland than a plateau. The district has two broad physical divisions – the southern part is a coal mining area with mining and industrial towns, and the northern part has villages scattered around hills. The landscape of the southern part is undulating and monotonous, with some scars of subsidence caused by underground mining. One of the many spurs of Parashnath Hills (1,365.50 m), in neighbouring Giridih district, passes through the Topchanchi and Tundi areas of the district. The spur attains a height of 457.29 m but there is no peak as such. The Dhangi Hills (highest peak 385.57 m) run from Pradhan Khunta to Gobindpur. While the main river Damodar flows along the southern boundary, its tributary, the Barakar, flows along the northern boundary. DVC has built two dams across the rivers. The Panchet Dam is across the Damodar and the Maithon Dam is across the Barakar.

== Maoist activities ==
Jharkhand is one of the states affected by Maoist activities. As of 2012, Dhanbad was one of the highly/moderately affected districts in the state.As of 2016, Dhanbad was not identified as a focus area by the state police to check Maoist activities. However, there were some isolated Maoist activities in the Dhanbad area.

== Geography ==
Baliapur is located at 23°24′57″N 86°31′27″E.

Baliapur CD Block is bounded by Dhanbad and Govindpur CD Blocks on the north, Nirsa CD Block on the east, Raghunathpur II CD Block, in Purulia district in West Bengal, on the south and Jharia CD Block on the west.

Baliapur CD Block has a forest area of 1453.36 kmhectares, covering 3.15% of the area of the CD Block.

Baliapur CD Block has an area of 173.31 km^{2} (66.92 sq mi). It has 21 gram panchayats and 66 villages. Baliapur Police Station serves this block. Headquarters of this CD Block is at Baliapur.

It is located 18 km from Dhanbad, the district headquarters.

== Demographics ==
=== Population ===
As per the 2011 Census of India Baliapur CD Block had a total population of 140,908, of which 121,494 were rural and 19,414 were urban. There were 73,278 (52%) males and 67,630 (48%) females. Population below 6 years was 20,055. Scheduled Castes numbered 19,623 (13.93%) and Scheduled Tribes numbered 18,798 (13.34%).

Baliapur CD Block has three census towns (2011 population figure in brackets): Alagdiha (4,609), Suranga (4,708) and Baliapur (10,097).

Large villages (with 4,000+ population) in Baliapur CD Block are (2011 census figures in brackets): Pradhan Khunta (4,399), Makunda (5,419), Kusmatanr (4,459), Parasbania (4,972) and Baghmara (7,655).

=== Literacy ===
As of 2011 census, the total number of literates in Baliapur CD Block was 84,983 (70.32% of the population over 6 years) out of which males numbered 51,309 (81.67% of the male population over 6 years) and females numbered 33,674 (58.03% of the female population over 6 years). The gender disparity (the difference between female and male literacy rates) was 23.64%.

As of 2011 census, literacy in Dhanbad district was 74.52%. Literacy in Jharkhand was 66.41% in 2011. Literacy in India in 2011 was 74.04%.

See also – List of Jharkhand districts ranked by literacy rate

Literacy in CD Blocks of
Dhanbad district
Tundi – 59.43%
Purbi Tundi – 61.20%
Topchanchi – 74.10%
Baghmara – 74.92%
Govindpur – 68.53%
Dhanbad – 78.47%
Baliapur – 70.32%
Nirsa – 68.92%
Jharia – 73.82%
Source: 2011 Census: CD Block Wise
Primary Census Abstract Data,
except for Jharia CD Block
where 2001 data has been used

=== Language ===
Hindi is the official language in Jharkhand and Urdu has been declared as an additional official language. Jharkhand legislature had passed a bill according the status of a second official language to several languages in 2011 but the same was turned down by the Governor.

In the 2011 census, Hindi was the mother-tongue (languages mentioned under Schedule 8 of the Constitution of India) of 62.5% of the population in Dhanbad district, followed by Bengali (19.3%) and Urdu (8.1%). The scheduled tribes constituted 8.4% of the total population of the district. Amongst the scheduled tribes those speaking Santali formed 77.2% of the ST population. Other tribes found in good numbers were: Munda, Mahli and Kora.

== Economy ==
=== Livelihood ===
Livelihood
in Baliapur CD Block
1. Cultivators (21.4%)
2. Agricultural labourers (13.3%)
3. Household industries (4.34%)
4. Other Workers (61.0%)

In Baliapur CD Block in 2011, amongst the class of total workers, cultivators numbered 10,090 and formed 21.36%, agricultural labourers numbered 6,294 and formed 13.33%, household industry workers numbered 2,052 and formed 4.34% and other workers numbered 28,795 and formed 60.97%.

Note: In the census records a person is considered a cultivator, if the person is engaged in cultivation/ supervision of land owned. When a person who works on another person's land for wages in cash or kind or share, is regarded as an agricultural labourer. Household industry is defined as an industry conducted by one or more members of the family within the household or village, and one that does not qualify for registration as a factory under the Factories Act. Other workers are persons engaged in some economic activity other than cultivators, agricultural labourers and household workers. It includes factory, mining, plantation, transport and office workers, those engaged in business and commerce, teachers and entertainment artistes.

=== Infrastructure ===
There are 63 inhabited villages in Baliapur CD Block. In 2011, 100% villages had power supply. 5 villages had tap water (treated/ untreated), all villages had well water (covered/ uncovered), all villages had hand pumps, and all villages had drinking water facility. 8 villages had post offices, 11 villages had sub post offices, 5 villages had telephones (land lines), 5 villages had public call offices and 27 villages had mobile phone coverage. All villages had pucca (paved) village roads, 14 villages had bus service (public/ private), 9 villages had railway stations, 23 villages had autos/ modified autos, and 19 villages had tractors. 7 villages had bank branches, 9 villages had agricultural credit societies, no village had cinema/ video hall, no village had public library and public reading rooms. 46 villages had public distribution system, 3 villages had weekly haat (market) and 43 villages had assembly polling stations.

=== Agriculture ===
Dhanbad district has infertile laterite soil, having a general tendency towards continuous deterioration. The soil can be classified in two broad categories – red sandy soil and red and yellow soil. There are patches of alluvium along the river banks. Limited water resources constitute a major constraint for cultivation. Paddy is the main crop. The soils for rice cultivation fall into three categories – baad, kanali and bahal. Aghani, is the main winter crop, consisting primarily of winter rice. Bhadai is the autumn crop. Apart from paddy, less important grain crops such as marua and maize are grown. The Rabi crop includes such cold weather crops as wheat, barley, oats, gram and pulses.

=== Backward Regions Grant Fund ===
Dhanbad district is listed as a backward region and receives financial support from the Backward Regions Grant Fund. The fund, created by the Government of India, is designed to redress regional imbalances in development. As of 2012, 272 districts across the country were listed under this scheme. The list includes 21 districts of Jharkhand.

== Transport ==
The Asansol-Gaya section, a part of the Grand Chord, passes through this block. There is a station at Pradhan Khunta on this line.

Deuli-Khairapal Road passes through this block.

== Education ==
In 2023, amongst the 64 inhabited villages in Baliapur CD Block, 1 village had no primary school, 34 villages had one primary school and 28 villages had more than one primary school. 39 villages had at least one primary school and one middle school. 9 villages had at least one middle school and one secondary school.

== Healthcare ==
In 2013, Baliapur CD Block had 1 block primary health centre, with 6 beds and 3 doctors (excluding private bodies). 2,122 patients were treated indoor and 39,474 patients were treated outdoor in the hospitals, health centres and subcentres of the CD Block.

In 2011, amongst the 63 inhabited villages in Baliapur CD Block, 5 villages had primary health centres, 17 villages had primary health sub-centres, 3 villages had maternity and child welfare centres, no village had a TB Clinic, no village had an allopathic hospital, no village had an alternative medicine hospital, no village had a dispensary, no village had veterinary hospital, 5 villages had medicine shops and 32 villages had no medical facilities.

== Panchayat List ==
There are 23 Panchayats in Baliapur.

1.Alakhdia

2.Alaktia

3.Amjhar

4.Baghmara

5.Baliapur East

6.Baliapur West

7.Baradaha

8.Bhikraj Pur

9.Chandkuya

10.Chattatand

11.Dolabar

12.Dudhiya

13.Gharbar

14.Jagdish

15.Karmatad

16.Kusmatad

17.Mukunda

18.Palani

19.Parasbania

20.Pradhankhunta

21.Sindurpur

22.Surunga

23.Birsinghpur

Baliapur is a rural Sub-District.
