= Bharat Coking Coal =

Indian coking coal mining company

Bharat Coking Coal Limited
- Type: Public Subsidiary
- Traded as: NSE: BHARATCOAL; BSE: 544678
- Industry: Coal
- Founded: 1972
- Headquarters: Dhanbad, India
- Area served: Jharkhand, West Bengal
- Key people: Samiran Dutta (CMD)
- Products: Coal
- Parent: Coal India
- Website: bcclweb.in

Bharat Coking Coal Limited (BCCL) is an Indian coking coal mining company, headquartered in Dhanbad. It is a subsidiary of Coal India Limited, a public sector enterprise which is under the administrative control of the Ministry of Coal. It was incorporated in January 1972 to operate coking coal mines (214 in number) operating in the Jharia and Raniganj Coalfields and was taken over by the Government of India on 16 October 1971.

BCCL contributes 50% of the total prime coking coal requirement of the steel sector. The company operates 36 coal mines, which include eleven underground, sixteen open cast & nine mixed mines in the year 2020. The company runs eight coal washeries, and four are under construction. Mines are grouped into twelve areas for administration.

BCCL is a major producer of prime coking coal (raw and washed) in India. Medium coking coal is produced in its mines in Mohuda and Barakar areas. In addition to the production of hard coke, BCCL operates washeries, sand gathering plants, a network of aerial ropeways for the transport of sand, and a coal bed methane-based power plant in Moonidih.

== History ==
BCCL incurred sustained losses from its incorporation in 1971 until it reported its first annual profit in 2005–06. BCCL's net worth turned negative in 1994–95, and the company was referred to the Board for Industrial and Financial Reconstruction in 2001 for rehabilitation. A capital infusion of ₹2,539 crore (US$433.29 million) by Coal India Limited in April 2013 revived BCCL from industrial sickness.

In January 2026, BCCL went public with an initial public offering structured as a book-built issue consisting solely of an offer for sale by its parent, Coal India Limited.

== Operations ==
A broad area-wise distribution of coalmines of Bharat Coking Coal Limited is given below:

Barora Area; Block II Area; Govindpur Area; Katras Area; Bastacola Area; Pootkee Balihari Area	Chanch/ Victoria Area; Kusunda Area; Lodna Area; Eastern Jharia Area; Sijua Area; Western Jharia Area

Note: All the linked Area pages provide relevant details of the collieries and carry maps indicating the location of the collieries

== See also ==
- Coal mining in India
