= Dumarkunda =

- Census Town
- Location in Jharkhand, India Dumarkunda (India)
- Coordinates: 23.72°N 86.79°E
- Country: India
- State: Jharkhand
- District: Dhanbad
- CD block: Nirsa

Area
  - Total: 6.003 km^{2} (2.318 sq mi)

Population (2011)
  - Total: 11,434
  - Density: 1,905/km^{2} (4,933/sq mi)

Languages
  - Official: Hindi, Urdu
- Time zone: UTC+5:30 (IST)
- Vehicle registration: JH
- Lok Sabha constituency: Dhanbad
- Vidhan Sabha constituency: Nirsa
- Website: dhanbad.nic.in

Dumarkunda is a census town in Nirsa CD block in Dhanbad Sadar subdivision of Dhanbad district in the state of Jharkhand, India.

== Geography ==
Cities, towns and locations in the eastern portion of Dhanbad Sadar subdivision in Dhanbad district
M: Municipality, CT: census town, N: neighbourhood, R: Rural/ Urban centre, D: Dam, P: Power Plant
Owing to space constraints in the small map, the actual locations in a larger map may vary slightly

=== Location ===
Dumarkunda is located at 23.72°N 86.79°E.

Note: The map alongside presents some of the notable locations in the area. All places marked in the map are linked in the larger full screen map.

=== Overview ===
The region shown in the map is a part of the undulating uplands bustling with coalmines. While the Damodar flows along the southern boundary, the Barakar flows along the eastern boundary. Both the rivers form the boundary with West Bengal. Panchet Dam and Maithon Dam, along with their reservoirs, are prominently visible in the map. The entire area is covered in Nirsa (community development block). In Nirsa CD block 69% of the population live in rural areas and 31% live in urban areas. The official website of the district has announced the formation of two new CD blocks – Egarkund and Kaliasole, possibly carved out of Nirsa CD block. As of July 2019, there is no further information about the new CD blocks. BCCL operates Chanch/ Victoria Area partially within the region shown in the map. ECL operates Mugma Area fully within the region shown in the map.

== Demographics ==
As per the 2011 Census of India, Dumarkunda had a total population of 11,434 of which 5,970 (52%) were males and 5,464 (48%) were females. Population below 6 years was 1,574. The total number of literates in Dumarkunda was 6,401 (64.92% of the population over 6 years).

As of 2001 India census, Dumarkunda had a population of 10,980. Males constitute 53% of the population and females 47%. Dumarkunda has an average literacy rate of 52%, lower than the national average of 59.5%: male literacy is 63% and, female literacy is 39%. In Dumarkunda, 15% of the population is under 6 years of age.

== Infrastructure ==
Dumarkunda has an area of 6.003 km^{2}. It is 43 km from the district headquarters Dhanbad. There is a railway station at Kumardubi 3 km away. Buses are available in Kumardubi. It has 7 km roads and has both covered and open drains. The two major sources of protected water supply are tap water from treated sources and hand pumps. There are 2,030 domestic electric connections and 5 road light points. Amongst the medical facilities, it has 1 hospital with 35 beds. Amongst the educational facilities, it has 2 primary schools and 2 middle schools. Secondary school and senior secondary school are there at Chirkunda 4 km away and general degree college is there at Maithon 10 km away. It has the branch office of 1 nationalised bank. It is a centre of the fire bricks industry.
