= Egarkunr =

Egarkunr Egarkund
- Census Town
- Location in Jharkhand, India Egarkunr (India)
- Coordinates: 23.75°N 86.77°E
- Country: India
- State: Jharkhand
- District: Dhanbad
- CD block: Nirsa

Area
  - Total: 2.462 km^{2} (0.951 sq mi)

Population (2011)
  - Total: 11,829
  - Density: 4,805/km^{2} (12,440/sq mi)

Languages
  - Official: Hindi, Urdu
- Time zone: UTC+5:30 (IST)
- PIN: 828203
- Vehicle registration: JH 10
- Lok Sabha constituency: Dhanbad
- Vidhan Sabha constituency: Nirsa
- Website: dhanbad.nic.in

Egarkund is a census town in Nirsa CD block in Dhanbad Sadar subdivision of Dhanbad district in the state of Jharkhand, India.

== Geography ==
Cities, towns and locations in the eastern portion of Dhanbad Sadar subdivision in Dhanbad district
M: Municipality, CT: Census town, N: Neighbourhood, R: Rural/ Urban centre, D: Dam, P: Power Plant
Owing to space constraints in the small map, the actual locations in a larger map may vary slightly

=== Location ===
Egarkunr is located at 23.75°N 86.77°E.

Note: The map alongside presents some of the notable locations in the area. All places marked in the map are linked in the larger full screen map.

=== Overview ===
The region shown in the map is a part of the undulating uplands bustling with coalmines. While the Damodar flows along the southern boundary, the Barakar flows along the eastern boundary. Both the rivers form the boundary with West Bengal. Panchet Dam and Maithon Dam, along with their reservoirs, are prominently visible in the map. The entire area is covered in Nirsa (community development block). In Nirsa CD block 69% of the population live in rural areas and 31% live in urban areas. The official website of the district has announced the formation of two new CD blocks – Egarkund and Kaliasole, possibly carved out of Nirsa CD block. As of July 2019, there is no further information about the new CD blocks. BCCL operates Chanch/ Victoria Area partially within the region shown in the map. ECL operates Mugma Area fully within the region shown in the map.

== Demographics ==
As per the 2011 Census of India, Egarkunar had a total population of 11,829 of which 6,100 (52%) were males and 5,729 (48%) were females. Population below 6 years was 1,704. The total number of literates in Egarkunar was 7,254 (71.64% of the population over 6 years).

As of 2001 India census, Egarkunr had a population of 10,212. Males constitute 54% of the population and females 46%. Egarkunr has an average literacy rate of 55%, lower than the national average of 59.5%; male literacy is 66%, and female literacy is 41%. In Egarkunr, 13% of the population is under 6 years of age.

== Infrastructure ==
Egarkunr has an area of 2.462 km^{2}. It is 40 km from the district headquarters Dhanbad. There is a railway station at Kumardubi 2 km away. Buses are available in the town. It has 11 km roads and open drains. The two major sources of protected water supply are tap water from treated sources and uncovered wells. There are 2,119 domestic electric connections and 8 road light points. Amongst the medical facilities, it has 1 hospital with 5 beds and 12 medicine shops. Amongst the educational facilities, it has 8 primary schools and 5 middle schools. There is a secondary school at Kumardubi, a senior secondary school at Taldanga 3 km away and a general degree college at Maithon 5 km away. It has facilities for producing aluminium products.
