= Siuliban =

Shiblibari Shiblibari
- Census Town
- Location in Jharkhand, India Shiblibari (India)
- Coordinates: 23.7512°N 86.7832°E
- Country: India
- State: Jharkhand
- District: Dhanbad
- CD block: Nirsa

Area
  - Total: 1.257 km^{2} (0.485 sq mi)

Population (2011)
  - Total: 24,125
  - Density: 19,190/km^{2} (49,710/sq mi)

Languages
  - Official: Hindi, Urdu
- Time zone: UTC+5:30 (IST)
- Vehicle registration: JH
- Lok Sabha constituency: Dhanbad
- Vidhan Sabha constituency: Nirsa
- Website: dhanbad.nic.in

Shiblibari is a census town in Nirsa CD block in Dhanbad Sadar subdivision of Dhanbad district in the Indian state of Jharkhand.

== Geography ==
Cities, towns and locations in the eastern portion of Dhanbad Sadar subdivision in Dhanbad district
M: Municipality, CT: census town, N: neighbourhood, R: Rural/ Urban centre, D: Dam, P: Power Plant
Owing to space constraints in the small map, the actual locations in a larger map may vary slightly

=== Location ===
Shiblibari is located at 23.7512°N 86.7832°E.

Note: The map alongside presents some of the notable locations in the area. All places marked in the map are linked in the larger full screen map.

=== Overview ===
The region shown in the map is a part of the undulating uplands bustling with coalmines. While the Damodar flows along the southern boundary, the Barakar flows along the eastern boundary. Both the rivers form the boundary with West Bengal. Panchet Dam and Maithon Dam, along with their reservoirs, are prominently visible in the map. The entire area is covered in Nirsa (community development block). In Nirsa CD block 69% of the population live in rural areas and 31% live in urban areas. The official website of the district has announced the formation of two new CD blocks – Egarkund and Kaliasole, possibly carved out of Nirsa CD block. As of July 2019, there is no further information about the new CD blocks. BCCL operates Chanch/ Victoria Area partially within the region shown in the map. ECL operates Mugma Area fully within the region shown in the map.

== Demographics ==
As per the 2011 Census of India, Shiblibari had a total population of 24,125 of which 12,730 (53%) were males and 11,395 (47%) were females. Population below 6 years was 3,299. The total number of literates in Shiblibari was 16,062 (77.12% of the population over 6 years).

As of 2001 India census, Shiblibari had a population of 20,960. Males constitute 53% of the population and females 47%. Shiblibari has an average literacy rate of 63%, higher than the national average of 59.5%: male literacy is 72%, and female literacy is 54%. In Shiblibari, 14% of the population is under 6 years of age.

== Infrastructure ==
Shiblibari has an area of 1.257 km^{2}. It is 44 km from the district headquarters Dhanbad. There is a railway station at Kumardubi 2 km away. Buses are available in the town. It has 15 km roads and both covered and open drains. The two major sources of protected water supply are tap water from treated sources and uncovered wells. There are 3,989 domestic electric connections and 2 road light points. Amongst the medical facilities, it has 10 medicine shops. Amongst the educational facilities, it has 6 primary schools, 10 middle schools and 1 secondary school. There are senior secondary school and general degree college at Maithon 1 km away. Amongst the recreational facilities, there is a cinema theatre. It has branches of 3 nationalised banks and one private commercial bank. It is a centre of the fire bricks industry and hard coke.
