= Panchmahali =

Panchmahali Panchmahli
- Census Town
- Location in Jharkhand, India Panchmahali (India)
- Coordinates: 23.7358°N 86.7747°E
- Country: India
- State: Jharkhand
- District: Dhanbad

Area
  - Total: 0.857 km^{2} (0.331 sq mi)

Population (2011)
  - Total: 4,832
  - Density: 5,640/km^{2} (14,600/sq mi)

Languages
  - Official: Hindi, Urdu
- Time zone: UTC+5:30 (IST)
- Lok Sabha constituency: Dhanbad
- Vidhan Sabha constituency: Nirsa
- Website: dhanbad.nic.in

Panchmahali (also spelled Panchmahli) is a census town in Nirsa CD block in Dhanbad Sadar subdivision of Dhanbad district in the Indian state of Jharkhand.

== Geography ==
Cities, towns and locations in the eastern portion of Dhanbad Sadar subdivision in Dhanbad district
M: Municipality, CT: census town, N: neighbourhood, R: Rural/ Urban centre, D: Dam, P: Power Plant
Owing to space constraints in the small map, the actual locations in a larger map may vary slightly

=== Location ===
Panchmahali is located at 23.7358°N 86.7747°E.

Note: The map alongside presents some of the notable locations in the area. All places marked in the map are linked in the larger full screen map.

=== Overview ===
The region shown in the map is a part of the undulating uplands bustling with coalmines. While the Damodar flows along the southern boundary, the Barakar flows along the eastern boundary. Both the rivers form the boundary with West Bengal. Panchet Dam and Maithon Dam, along with their reservoirs, are prominently visible in the map. The entire area is covered in Nirsa (community development block). In Nirsa CD block 69% of the population live in rural areas and 31% live in urban areas. The official website of the district has announced the formation of two new CD blocks – Egarkund and Kaliasole, possibly carved out of Nirsa CD block. As of July 2019, there is no further information about the new CD blocks. BCCL operates Chanch/ Victoria Area partially within the region shown in the map. ECL operates Mugma Area fully within the region shown in the map.

== Demographics ==
As per the 2011 Census of India, Panchmahali had a total population of 4,832 of which 2,568 (53%) were males and 2,264 (47%) were females. Population below 6 years was 664. The total number of literates in Panchmahali was 2,996 (71.88% of the population over 6 years).

== Infrastructure ==
Panchmahali has an area of 0.857 km^{2}. It is 45 km from the district headquarters Dhanbad. There is a railway station at Kumardubi 3 km away. Buses are available in the town. It has 6 km roads and open drains. The two major sources of protected water supply are uncovered wells and tap water from treated sources. There are 749 domestic electric connections and 400 road light points. Amongst the medical facilities, it has 1 medicine shop. Amongst the educational facilities, it has 1 primary school and 1 middle school. Secondary school, senior secondary school and general degree college are there at Kumadubhi.
