= Panchet =

- Census Town
- Location in Jharkhand, India Panchet (India)
- Coordinates: 23.69°N 86.76°E
- Country: India
- State: Jharkhand
- District: Dhanbad
- CD block: Nirsa

Population (2011)
  - Total: 7,296

Languages
  - Official: Hindi, Urdu
- Time zone: UTC+5:30 (IST)
- Vehicle registration: JH
- Lok Sabha constituency: Dhanbad
- Vidhan Sabha constituency: Nirsa
- Website: dhanbad.nic.in

Panchet is a census town in Nirsa CD block in Dhanbad Sadar subdivision of Dhanbad district in the Indian state of Jharkhand.

== History ==
During construction of dam several ruin of Tilakampa kingdom were submerged in the dam. Telkupi was capital of Tilakampa Kingdom. The ruins of Jain temples of Telkupi dates back to the 1st century CE. Probably Panchkot Raj was a part of this kingdom. The ruins of the Garh Panchkot the capital of Panchkot Raj located at the foothills of Panchet. The Panchet estate, also known as Panchet Raj, was a princely estate in British India. It primarily covered Manbhum and some portions of the Burdwan, Bankura, and Ranchi districts British administrative.

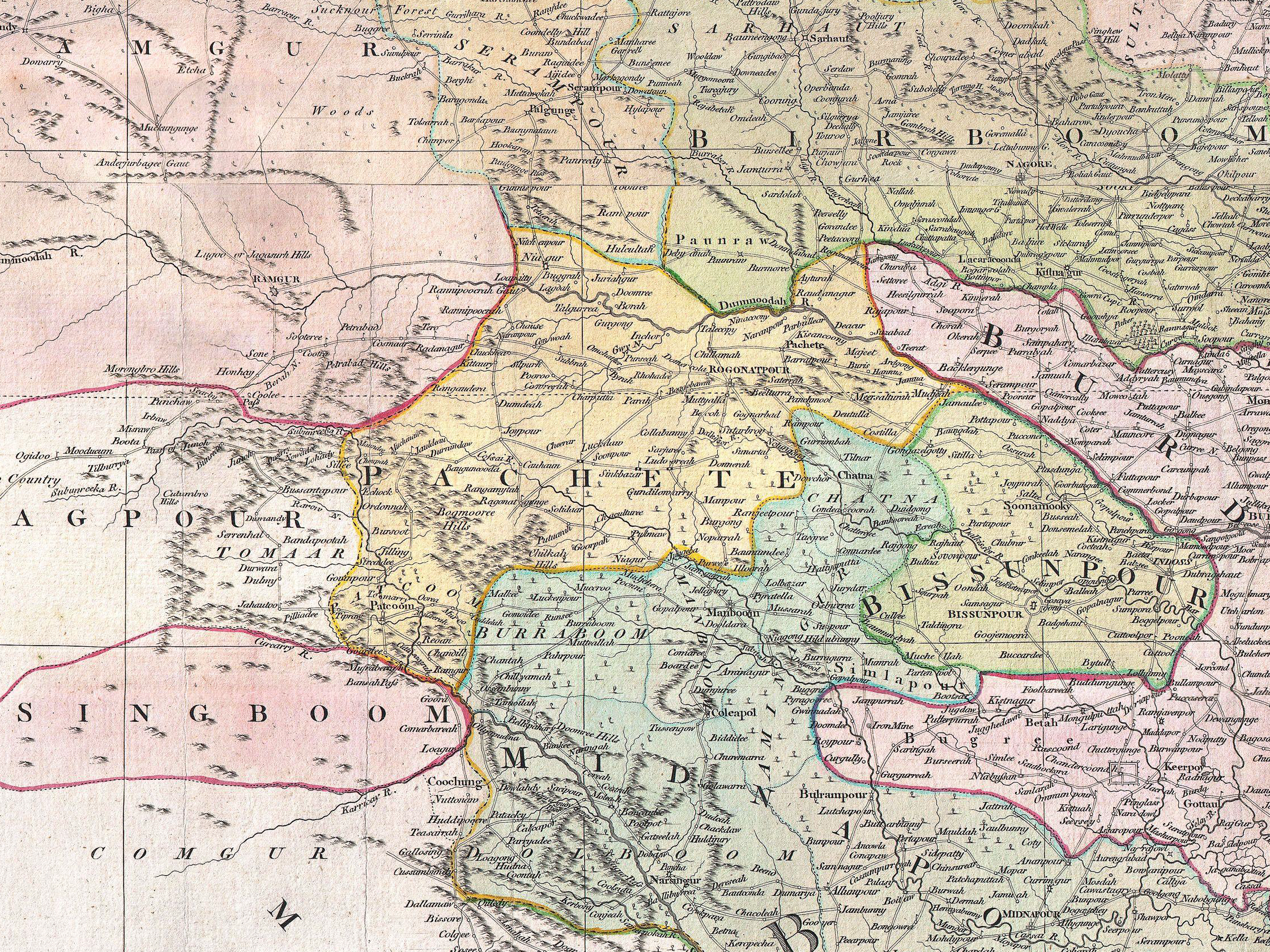
Panchet in 1776

The Panchet estate, believed to have formed through the consolidation of smaller zamindaris, had lost all traces of its previous rulers or chiefs by the start of the British colonial period. This estate was situated between latitudes 22° 56' and 23° 54' and longitudes 85° 46' and 87° 10', encompassing a significant region comprising 22 parganas and covering an extensive area of 1,254,172 acres (approximately 1890 square miles). Panchet consists of high diversity from all the tribes and locals.

== Geography ==
Cities, towns and locations in the eastern portion of Dhanbad Sadar subdivision in Dhanbad district
M: Municipality, CT: census town, N: neighbourhood, R: Rural/ Urban centre, D: Dam, P: Power Plant
Owing to space constraints in the small map, the actual locations in a larger map may vary slightly

=== Location ===
Panchet is located at 23.69°N 86.76°E.

Note: The map alongside presents some of the notable locations in the area. All places marked in the map are linked in the larger full screen map.

=== Overview ===
The region shown in the map is a part of the undulating uplands bustling with coalmines. While the Damodar flows along the southern boundary, the Barakar flows along the eastern boundary. Both the rivers form the boundary with West Bengal. Panchet Dam and Maithon Dam, along with their reservoirs, are prominently visible in the map. The entire area is covered in Nirsa (community development block). In Nirsa CD block 69% of the population live in rural areas and 31% live in urban areas. The official website of the district has announced the formation of two new CD blocks – Egarkund and Kaliasole, possibly carved out of Nirsa CD block. As of July 2019, there is no further information about the new CD blocks. BCCL operates Chanch/ Victoria Area partially within the region shown in the map. ECL operates Mugma Area fully within the region shown in the map.

=== Panchet Dam ===
Panchet Dam across the Damodar River is located at Panchet.

== Demographics ==
As per the 2011 Census of India, Panchet had a total population of 7,296 of which 3,821 (52%) were males and 3,475 (48%) were females. Population below 6 years was 822. The total number of literates in Panchet was 5,013 (77.43% of the population over 6 years).

As of 2001 India census, Panchet had a population of 8,353. Males constitute 53% of the population and females 47%. Panchet has an average literacy rate of 67%, higher than the national average of 59.5%: male literacy is 77%, and female literacy is 56%. In Panchet, 12% of the population is under 6 years of age.

=== Languages ===
Languages spoken in Panchet (2011)
1. Bengali (44.6%)
2. Hindi (15.6%)
3. Khortha (13.6%)
4. Santali (12.1%)
5. Bhojpuri (5.29%)
6. Others (8.56%)

== Infrastructure ==
Panchet has an area of 2.411 km^{2}. It is 50 km from the district headquarters Dhanbad. There is a railway station at Kumardubi 9 km away. Buses are available in the town. It has 25 km roads and has both covered and open drains. The two major sources of protected water supply are tap water from treated sources and uncovered wells. There are 1,242 domestic electric connections and 400 road light points. Amongst the medical facilities, it has 3 hospital with 30 beds and 2 medicine shops. Amongst the educational facilities, it has 2 primary schools, 2 middle schools, 1 secondary school and 1 senior secondary school. There is a general degree college at Maithon 15 km away. Amongst the recreational and cultural facilities, it has 1 auditorium/ community hall, 1 library and 1 reading room. It has the branch offices of 2 nationalised banks, 1 agricultural credit society and 1 non-agricultural credit society.
