= Mugma =

- Village
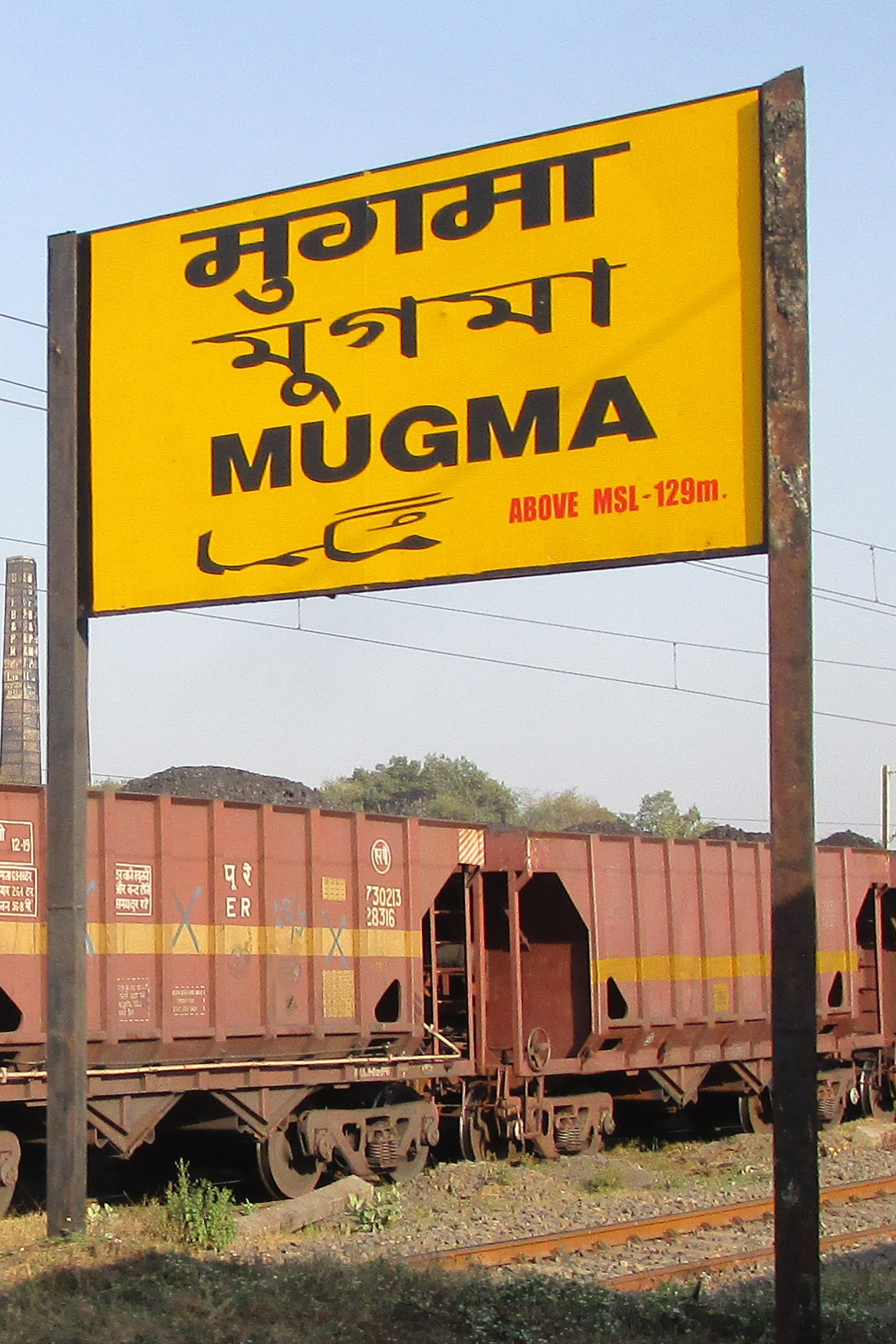
- Mugma Railway Station nameplate

- Location in Jharkhand, India Mugma (India)
- Coordinates: 23.77°N 86.73°E
- Country: India
- State: Jharkhand
- District: Dhanbad
- CD block: Nirsa
- Elevation: 132 m (433 ft)

Population (2001)
  - Total: 2,978

Languages
  - Official: Hindi, Urdu
- Time zone: UTC+5:30 (IST)
- Vehicle registration: JH
- Lok Sabha constituency: Dhanbad
- Vidhan Sabha constituency: Nirsa
- Website: dhanbad.nic.in

Mugma is a village in Nirsa CD Block in Dhanbad district in the Indian state of Jharkhand.

== Geography ==
Cities, towns and locations in the eastern portion of Dhanbad Sadar subdivision in Dhanbad district
M: Municipality, CT: census town, N: neighbourhood, R: Rural/ Urban centre, D: Dam, P: Power Plant
Owing to space constraints in the small map, the actual locations in a larger map may vary slightly

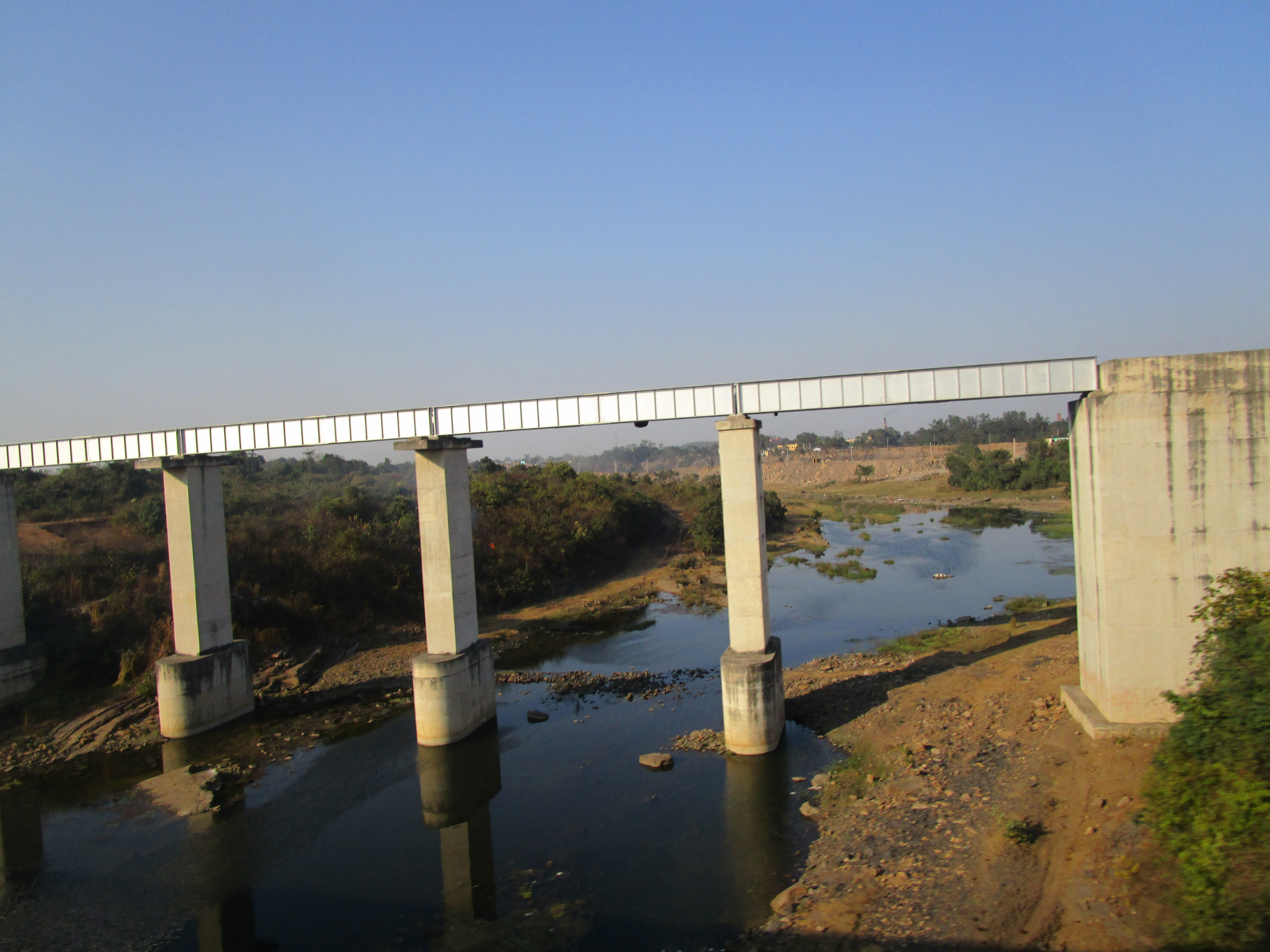
Khudia River towards Mugma Railway Station, Dhanbad

=== Location ===
Mugma is located at 23.77°N 86.73°E. It has an average elevation of 132 metres (433 feet).

Note: The map alongside presents some of the notable locations in the area. All places marked in the map are linked in the larger full screen map.

=== Overview ===
The region shown in the map is a part of the undulating uplands bustling with coalmines. While the Damodar flows along the southern boundary, the Barakar flows along the eastern boundary. Both the rivers form the boundary with West Bengal. Panchet Dam and Maithon Dam, along with their reservoirs, are prominently visible in the map. The entire area is covered in Nirsa (community development block). In Nirsa CD block 69% of the population live in rural areas and 31% live in urban areas. The official website of the district has announced the formation of two new CD blocks – Egarkund and Kaliasole, possibly carved out of Nirsa CD block. As of July 2019, there is no further information about the new CD blocks. BCCL operates Chanch/ Victoria Area partially within the region shown in the map. ECL operates Mugma Area fully within the region shown in the map.

== Demographics ==
As per the 2011 Census of India, Mugma had a total population of 4,277 of which 2,238 (52%) were males and 2,039 (48%) were females. Population below 6 years was 604. The total number of literates in Mugma was 2,616 (71.22% of the population over 6 years).

As of 2001 India census, Mugma had a population of 2,978. Males constitute 56% of the population and females 44%. Mugma has an average literacy rate of 54%, lower than the national average of 59.5%: male literacy is 66%, and female literacy is 39%. In Mugma, 13% of the population is under 6 years of age.

== Economy ==
As per ECL website telephone numbers, operational collieries in the Mugma Area of Eastern Coalfields in 2018 are: Badjna Colliery, Bermury OCP, Chapapur Colliery, Gopinathpur Colliery, Hariajam Colliery, Kumardhubi Colliery, Khoodia Colliery, Kapasara Colliery, Lakhimata Colliery, Mandman Colliery, Rajpura OCP and Shampur B.

== Transport ==
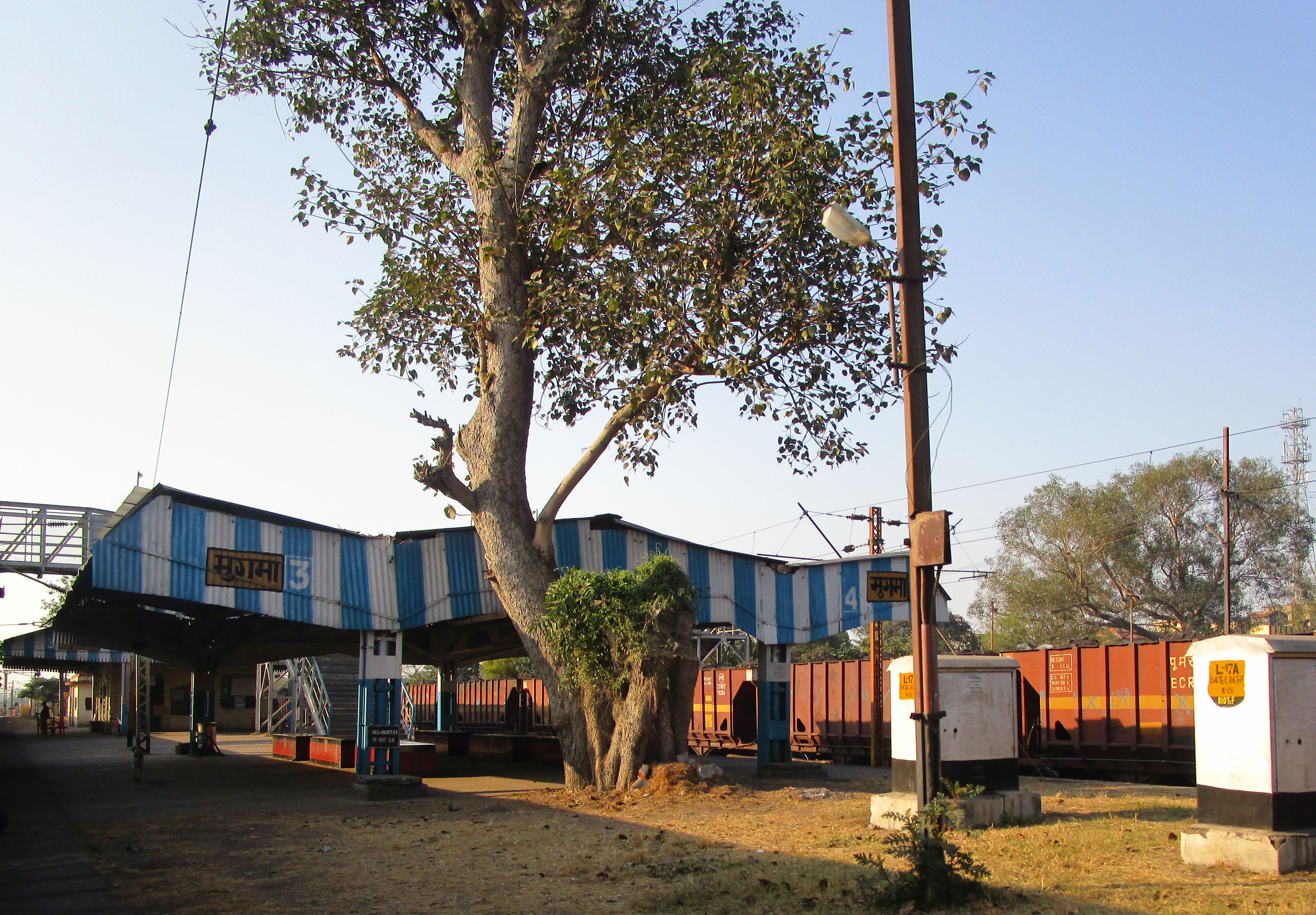
Mugma Railway Station platform

There is a station at Mugma on the Asansol-Gaya section, which is a part of the Grand Chord, Howrah-Gaya-Delhi line and Howrah-Allahabad-Mumbai line.

Mugma is on the old Grand Trunk Road. NH 19 (old numbering NH 2), running from Agra to Kolkata, leaves GT Road at/ near Brindabanpur and passes mostly outside the crowded towns and mining areas and rejoins GT Road after Asansol.

== Education ==
Major Schools: De Nobili School, Mugma

== See also ==
- Parbelia
