= Marma =

Marma may refer to:

- Marma people, an ethnic Arakanese group in Bangladesh
- Marma language, of Bangladesh
- Marma (spider), a genus of spiders
- Marma (film), a 2002 Indian film
- Marma, Sweden, a town in Sweden
- Marma, Dhanbad, a town in India
- Marma (ayurveda), in ayurveda, a pressure point on the body
  - Marmam or varma kalai, an Indian art of pressure points
