= Chota Ambona =

Village in Jharkhand, India

Chota Ambona Chhot Ambana
- Village
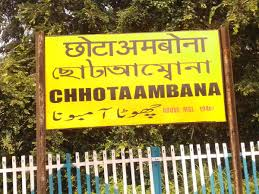

- Location in Jharkhand, India Chota Ambona (India)
- Coordinates: 23°45′24″N 86°34′58″E
- Country: India
- State: Jharkhand
- District: Dhanbad

Government
  - Type: Representative Democracy
  - Body: Gram Panchayat

Area
  - Total: 4.4 km^{2} (1.7 sq mi)

Population (2011)
  - Total: 1,421
  - Density: 320/km^{2} (840/sq mi)

Languages
  - Official: Hindi, Urdu
- Time zone: UTC+5:30 (IST)
- PIN: 828201 (Baliapur)
- Telephone/ STD code: 0326
- Vehicle registration: JH 10
- Website: dhanbad.nic.in

Chota Ambona is a village in Nirsa (community development block) of Dhanbad district in Jharkhand, India. It is the former location of the now closed Khandelwal Glass Factory. Currently it houses one of the largest concrete sleeper manufacturing unit under Eastern Railways.

== Demographics ==
Chota Ambona village has population of 1421 of which 724 are males while 697 are females as per population census 2011.

In Chota Ambona village population of children with age 0-6 is 195 which makes up 13.72 % of total population of village. Average sex ratio of Chota Ambona village is 963, which is higher than Jharkhand state average of 948. Child sex ratio for Chota Ambona is 1097, higher than Jharkhand average of 948.
