= Nirsa (community development block) =

Nirsa Nirsa-cum-Chirkunda
- Community development block
- Location in Jharkhand, India Nirsa (India)
- Coordinates: 23°47′10″N 86°42′22″E
- Country: India
- State: Jharkhand
- District: Dhanbad
- CD Block: Nirsa

Government
  - Type: Representative democracy

Area
  - Total: 431.96 km^{2} (166.78 sq mi)
- Elevation: 144 m (472 ft)

Population (2011)
  - Total: 381,105
  - Density: 882.27/km^{2} (2,285.1/sq mi)

Languages
  - Official: Hindi, Bengali, Urdu

Literacy (2011)
  - Total literates: 225,102 (68.91%)
- Time zone: UTC+5:30 (IST)
- PIN: 828205 (Nirsa Chatti)
- Telephone/STD code: 06540
- Vehicle registration: JH 10
- Lok Sabha constituency: Dhanbad
- Vidhan Sabha constituency: Nirsa
- Website: dhanbad.nic.in

Nirsa is a community development block that forms an administrative division in Dhanbad Sadar subdivision of Dhanbad district, Jharkhand state, India.

== Overview ==
Dhanbad district forms a part of the Chota Nagpur Plateau, but it is more of an upland than a plateau. The district has two broad physical divisions – the southern part is a coal mining area with mining and industrial towns, and the northern part has villages scattered around hills. The landscape of the southern part is undulating and monotonous, with some scars of subsidence caused by underground mining. One of the many spurs of Parashnath Hills (1,365.50 m), located in neighbouring Giridih district, passes through the Topchanchi and Tundi areas of the district. The spur attains a height of 457.29 m but there is no peak as such. The Dhangi Hills (highest peak 385.57 m) run from Pradhan Khunta to Gobindpur. While the main river Damodar flows along the southern boundary, its tributary, the Barakar, flows along the northern boundary. DVC has built two dams across the rivers. The Panchet Dam is across the Damodar and the Maithon Dam is across the Barakar.

== Maoist activities ==
Jharkhand is one of the states affected by Maoist activities. As of 2012, Dhanbad was one of the highly/moderately affected districts in the state.As of 2016, Dhanbad was not identified as a focus area by the state police to check Maoist activities. However, there were some isolated Maoist activities in the Dhanbad area.

== Geography ==
Nirsa is located at 23°47′10″N 86°42′22″E.

Nirsa CD Block is bounded by Jamtara CD Block, in Jamtara district, on the north, Salanpur CD Block, in Paschim Bardhaman district in West Bengal, on the east, Neturia CD Block, in Purulia district in West Bengal, on the south and Baliapur, Govindpur and Purbi Tundi CD Blocks on the west.

Nirsa CD Block has a forest area of 2,528.97 hectares, covering 6.07% of the area of the CD Block.

Nirsa CD Block has an area of 431.96 km^{2}. It has 68 gram panchayats and 119 villages. Nirsa and Chirkunda Police Stations serve this block. Headquarters of this CD Block is at Nirsa.

It is located 30 km from Dhanbad, the district headquarters.

== Demographics ==
=== Population ===
As per the 2011 Census of India Nirsa CD Block had a total population of 381,105, of which 261,893 were rural and 119,212 were urban. There were 197,591 (52%) males and 183,514 (48%) females. Population below 6 years was 54,481. Scheduled Castes numbered 64,573 (16.94%) and Scheduled Tribes numbered 61,350 (16.10%).

Nirsa CD Block has several census towns (2011 population figure in brackets): Bhamal (4,818), Panrra (9,563), Nirsa (14,794), Marma (4,640), Egarkunr (11,829), Siuliban (24,125), Mera (7,051), Maithon (18,830), Panchmahali (4,832), Dumarkunda (11,434) and Panchet (7,296).

Large villages (with 4,000+ population) in Nirsa CD Block are (2011 census figures in brackets): Kapsara (4,138), Brindabanpur (4,345), Gopinathpur (4,369) and Mugma (4,277).

=== Literacy ===
As of 2011 census the total number of literates in Nirsa CD Block was 225,102 (68.92% of the population over 6 years) out of which males numbered 135,442 (71.93% of the male population over 6 years) and females numbered 89,660 (57.05% of the female population over 6 years). The gender disparity (the difference between female and male literacy rates) was 22.89%.

As of 2011 census, literacy in Dhanbad district was 74.52%. Literacy in Jharkhand was 66.41% in 2011. Literacy in India in 2011 was 74.04%.

See also – List of Jharkhand districts ranked by literacy rate

Literacy in CD Blocks of
Dhanbad district
Tundi – 59.43%
Purbi Tundi – 61.20%
Topchanchi – 74.10%
Baghmara – 74.92%
Govindpur – 68.53%
Dhanbad – 78.47%
Baliapur – 70.32%
Nirsa – 68.92%
Jharia – 73.82%
Source: 2011 Census: CD Block Wise
Primary Census Abstract Data,
except for Jharia CD Block
where 2001 data has been used

=== Language ===
Hindi is the official language in Jharkhand and Urdu has been declared as an additional official language. Jharkhand legislature had passed a bill according the status of a second official language to several languages in 2011 but the same was turned down by the Governor.

In the 2011 census, Hindi was the mother-tongue (languages mentioned under Schedule 8 of the Constitution of India) of 62.5% of the population in Dhanbad district, followed by Bengali (19.3%) and Urdu (8.1%). The scheduled tribes constituted 8.4% of the total population of the district. Amongst the scheduled tribes those speaking Santali formed 77.2% of the ST population. Other tribes found in good numbers were: Munda, Mahli and Kora.

== Economy ==
=== Livelihood ===
Livelihood
in Nirsa CD Block
1. Cultivators (17.9%)
2. Agricultural labourers (20.2%)
3. Household industries (2.63%)
4. Other Workers (59.3%)

In Nirsa CD Block in 2011, amongst the class of total workers, cultivators numbered 23,423 and formed 17.90%, agricultural labourers numbered 26,413 and formed 20.19%, household industry workers numbered 3,440 and formed 2.63% and other workers numbered 77,577 and formed 59.29%.

Note: In the census records a person is considered a cultivator, if the person is engaged in cultivation/ supervision of land owned. When a person who works on another person's land for wages in cash or kind or share, is regarded as an agricultural labourer. Household industry is defined as an industry conducted by one or more members of the family within the household or village, and one that does not qualify for registration as a factory under the Factories Act. Other workers are persons engaged in some economic activity other than cultivators, agricultural labourers and household workers. It includes factory, mining, plantation, transport and office workers, those engaged in business and commerce, teachers and entertainment artistes.

=== Infrastructure ===
There are 221 inhabited villages in Nirsa CD Block. In 2011, 214 villages had power supply. 48 villages had tap water (treated/ untreated), all villages had well water (covered/ uncovered), 203 villages had hand pumps, and all villages had drinking water facility. 18 villages had post offices, 30 villages had sub post offices, 27 villages had telephones (land lines), 65 villages had public call offices and 133 villages had mobile phone coverage. 219 villages had pucca (paved) village roads, 34 villages had bus service (public/ private), 7 villages had railway stations, 58 villages had autos/ modified autos, and 95 villages had tractors. 12 villages had bank branches, 6 villages had agricultural credit societies, no village had cinema/ video hall, no village had public library and public reading rooms. 142 villages had public distribution system, 6 villages had weekly haat (market) and 168 villages had assembly polling stations.

=== Coal ===
Jharia coalfield is the richest treasure house of metallurgical coal in India. A portion of the Chanch/Victoria Area of BCCL and the Mugma/Nirsa Area of ECL are located in the Nirsa CD Block.

The following collieries function under the Chanch/Victoria Area: Dahibari and Dumagaria.

The Chanch Victoria area is the lone area of BCCL located in West Bengal and partly in Jharkhand. The Barakar flows through the area.

The following collieries of Mugma field function under the Mugma Area of Eastern Coalfields: Chapapur II, Badjna, Nirsa, Mandman, Kapasara, Lakhimata, Kumardhubi, Gopinathpur, Khudia Open Cast, Khudia Under Ground, Shyampur A, Shyampur B, Hariyajam, Rajpura OCP and Barmuri OCP.

=== Industry ===
The area has numerous hard coke plants.

=== Agriculture ===
Dhanbad district has infertile laterite soil, having a general tendency towards continuous deterioration. The soil can be classified in two broad categories – red sandy soil and red and yellow soil. There are patches of alluvium along the river banks. Limited water resources constitute a major constraint for cultivation. Paddy is the main crop. The soils for rice cultivation fall into three categories – baad, kanali and bahal. Aghani, is the main winter crop, consisting primarily of winter rice. Bhadai is the autumn crop. Apart from paddy, less important grain crops such as marua and maize are grown. The Rabi crop includes such cold weather crops as wheat, barley, oats, gram and pulses.

=== Backward Regions Grant Fund ===
Dhanbad district is listed as a backward region and receives financial support from the Backward Regions Grant Fund. The fund, created by the Government of India, is designed to redress regional imbalances in development. As of 2012, 272 districts across the country were listed under this scheme. The list includes 21 districts of Jharkhand.

== Transport ==
The Asansol-Gaya section, a part of the Grand Chord, Howrah-Gaya-Delhi line and Howrah-Allahabad-Mumbai line, passes through this block. There are stations at Mugma and Kumardhubi on this line.

NH 19 (old no. NH 2)/ Grand Trunk Road passes through this block.

== Education ==
In 2011, amongst the 221 inhabited villages in Nirsa CD Block, 17 villages had no primary schools, 153 villages had one primary school and 51 villages had more than one primary school. 82 villages had at least one primary school and one middle school. 19 villages had at least one middle school and one secondary school.

== Healthcare ==
In 2013, Nirsa CD Block had 1 block primary health centre, 8 primary health centres, 4 medical units of Central Government/ Central PSU and 18 private nursing homes with total 54 beds and 11 doctors (excluding private bodies). 4,364 patients were treated indoor and 60,104 patients were treated outdoor in the hospitals, health centres and subcentres of the CD Block.

In 2011, amongst the 221 inhabited villages in Nirsa CD Block, 13 villages had primary health centres, 26 villages had primary health sub-centres, 4 villages had maternity and child welfare centres, 6 villages had a TB Clinic, 9 villages had allopathic hospitals, 9 villages had alternative medicine hospitals, 12 villages had dispensaries, 6 villages had veterinary hospitals, 17 villages had medicine shops and 160 villages had no medical facilities.
