= Budhni Manjhiyain =

Indian woman from the Santhali tribe

Budhni Manjhiyain, also known as Budhni Mejhan and called Nehru's tribal wife, was a woman from the Santhali tribe. She became famous and also gained infamy after as a 15-year-old she garlanded Jawaharlal Nehru during the inauguration of a dam. She was ostracized by her community.

== Background ==
Jawaharlal Nehru, the prime minister, wanted a women working in Damodar Valley Corporation to be present during the inauguration in 1959 of the Panchet Dam over the Damodar river. Budhni Manjhiyain and the Santholi man Ravan Manjhii were selected to welcome him. Here she garlanded him and in reciprocation Nehru garlanded her. After the function, when she returned to her village Karbona she was told by the village elders that by garlanding Nehru she married him and as she married a non Santhali, she was banished by the Santhali elders and told to leave her village. She was sacked from Damodar Valley Corporation in 1962. She later worked as a daily-wager in Purulia. Her plight came to the notice of Rajiv Gandhi who meet her in 1985 and later she was reinstated to her job in Damodar Valley Corporation where she worked until her retirement in 2005. But she could never return to her village.
