= Kumardubi railway station =

Railway station in Dhanbad district, Jharkhand, India

Kumardubi
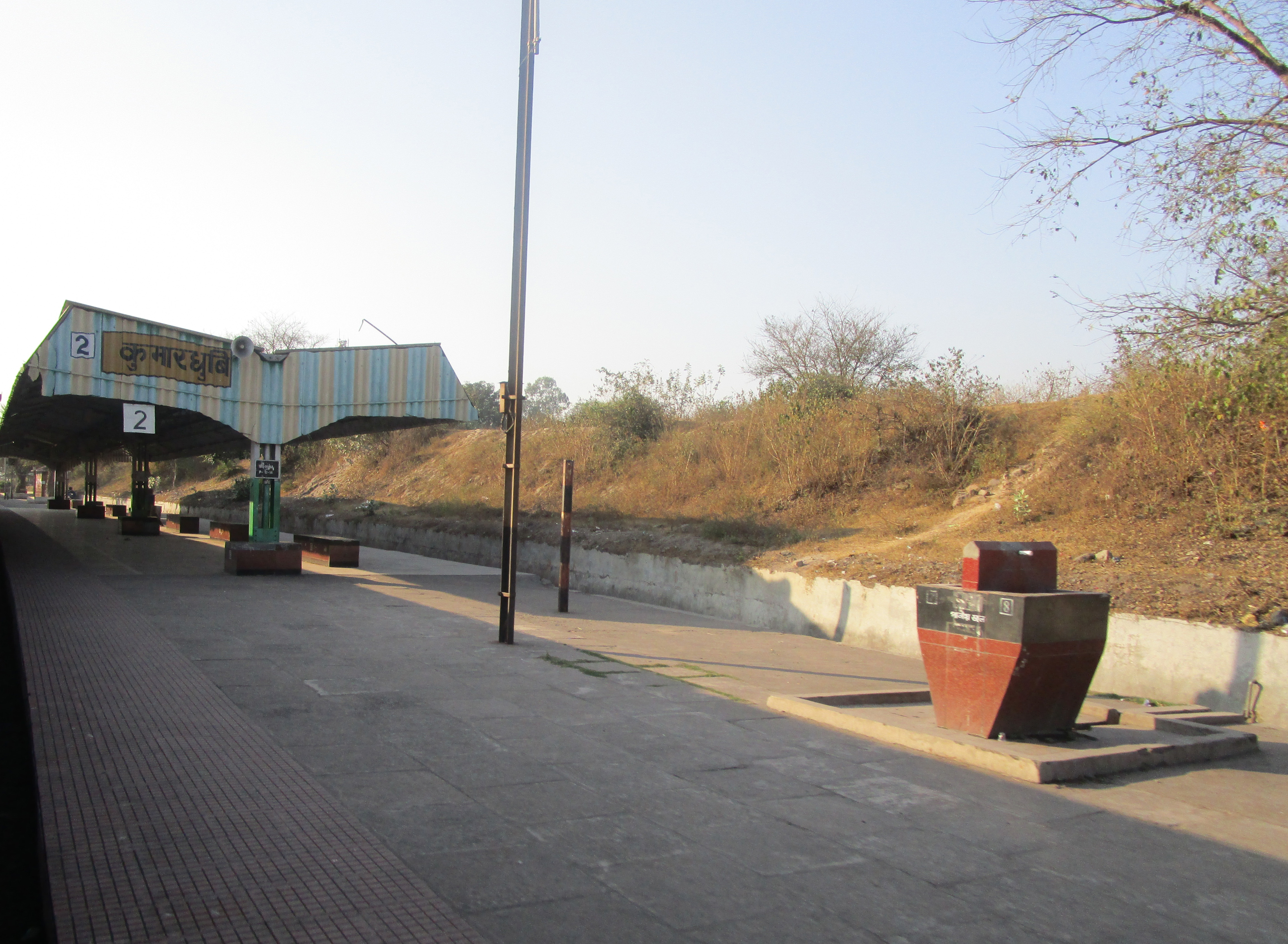

General information
- Location: Kumardubi, Dhanbad District, Jharkhand; India
- Coordinates: 23.74750°N 86.79304°E
- Elevation: 130 metres (430 ft)
- System: Indian Railways station
- Owner: Indian Railways
- Operator: Eastern Railway
- Line: Howrah–Gaya–Delhi line
- Platforms: 2
- Tracks: Broad gauge

Construction
- Structure type: At-grade
- Parking: No

Other information
- Status: Active
- Station code: KMME
- Zone(s): Eastern Railway
- Division(s): Asansol
- Classification: NSG-5

History
- Electrified: 1960−61
- Former names: East Indian Railway
Route map
- Sources: Google maps; Indian Railway Time Table (Indiarailinfo); Hatia-Bardhaman Passenger 53062; Gomoh-Barkakana Passenger 461EC
Location
- Location within Jharkhand
- Interactive map

Kumardubi railway station (station code: KMME)is a railway station on the Howrah–Gaya–Delhi line, located in Dhanbad district of Jharkhand, India. It comes under the Asansol railway division of the Eastern Railway zone. The station is located between Mugma and Barakar railway stations and serves Kumardubi, and its nearby areas. Both Express as well as passenger EMU trains have scheduled halts here.

== Facilities ==
The station has two platforms, which are linked by a foot overbridge. Basic passenger facilities include a ticket counter, platform shelters and a drinking water supply. However, the station is being redeveloped under the Amrit Bharat Station Scheme. Upon completion, Kumardubi will feature upgraded platforms, a new station building with a spacious entrance, improved parking area, air conditioned waiting halls, modern restrooms, ramps for easy accessibility, and enhanced lighting.

The redevelopment will also include free Wi-Fi, a One Station One Product stall and improved passenger information systems, offering upgraded amenities comparable to those at major railway stations.

== Trains ==
Several express and passenger trains halt at Kumardubi railway station, providing connectivity to major cities such as Howrah, Delhi and Patna etc. The station serves both long distance and local commuters with trains like the Saktipunj Express, Coalfield Express and Black Diamond Express among the regular services. Its strategic location on the Howrah–Gaya–Delhi main line makes it an important stop for passengers traveling across Jharkhand, Bihar and West Bengal.

== See also ==
- Asansol railway division
- Eastern Railway zone
- Howrah–Gaya-Delhi main line
- Asansol–Gaya section
