= Maithon =

- Census Town
- Location in Jharkhand, India Maithon (India)
- Coordinates: 23.78°N 86.81°E
- Country: India
- State: Jharkhand
- District: Dhanbad
- CD block: Nirsa

Area
  - Total: 2.951 km^{2} (1.139 sq mi)

Population (2011)
  - Total: 18,830
  - Density: 6,381/km^{2} (16,530/sq mi)

Languages
  - Official: Bengali, Hindi, Urdu
- Time zone: UTC+5:30 (IST)
- PIN: 828207
- Vehicle registration: JH
- Lok Sabha constituency: Dhanbad
- Vidhan Sabha constituency: Nirsa
- Website: dhanbad.nic.in

Maithon is a census town in Nirsa CD Block in Dhanbad Sadar subdivision of Dhanbad district in the Indian state of Jharkhand. It is situated on the banks of river Barakar

== Etymology ==
The name has been derived from Maithan or Maa-er-Sthaan, meaning 'Mother's Place' in Bengali. The place of Maa or Mother, refers to Goddess Durga or Ma Kalyaneswari of the famous Kalyaneshwari temple nearby.

== Geography ==
Cities, towns and locations in the eastern portion of Dhanbad Sadar subdivision in Dhanbad district
M: Municipality, CT: census town, N: neighbourhood, R: Rural/ Urban centre, D: Dam, P: Power Plant
Owing to space constraints in the small map, the actual locations in a larger map may vary slightly

Maithon is located at 23.78°N 86.81°E.

Note: The map alongside presents some of the notable locations in the area. All places marked in the map are linked in the larger full screen map.

The region shown in the map is a part of the undulating uplands bustling with coalmines. While the Damodar flows along the southern boundary, the Barakar flows along the eastern boundary. Both the rivers form the boundary with West Bengal. Panchet Dam and Maithon Dam, along with their reservoirs, are prominently visible in the map. The entire area is covered in Nirsa (community development block). In Nirsa CD block 69% of the population live in rural areas and 31% live in urban areas. The official website of the district has announced the formation of two new CD blocks – Egarkund and Kaliasole, possibly carved out of Nirsa CD block. As of July 2019, there is no further information about the new CD blocks. BCCL operates Chanch/ Victoria Area partially within the region shown in the map. ECL operates Mugma Area fully within the region shown in the map.

=== Maithon Dam ===
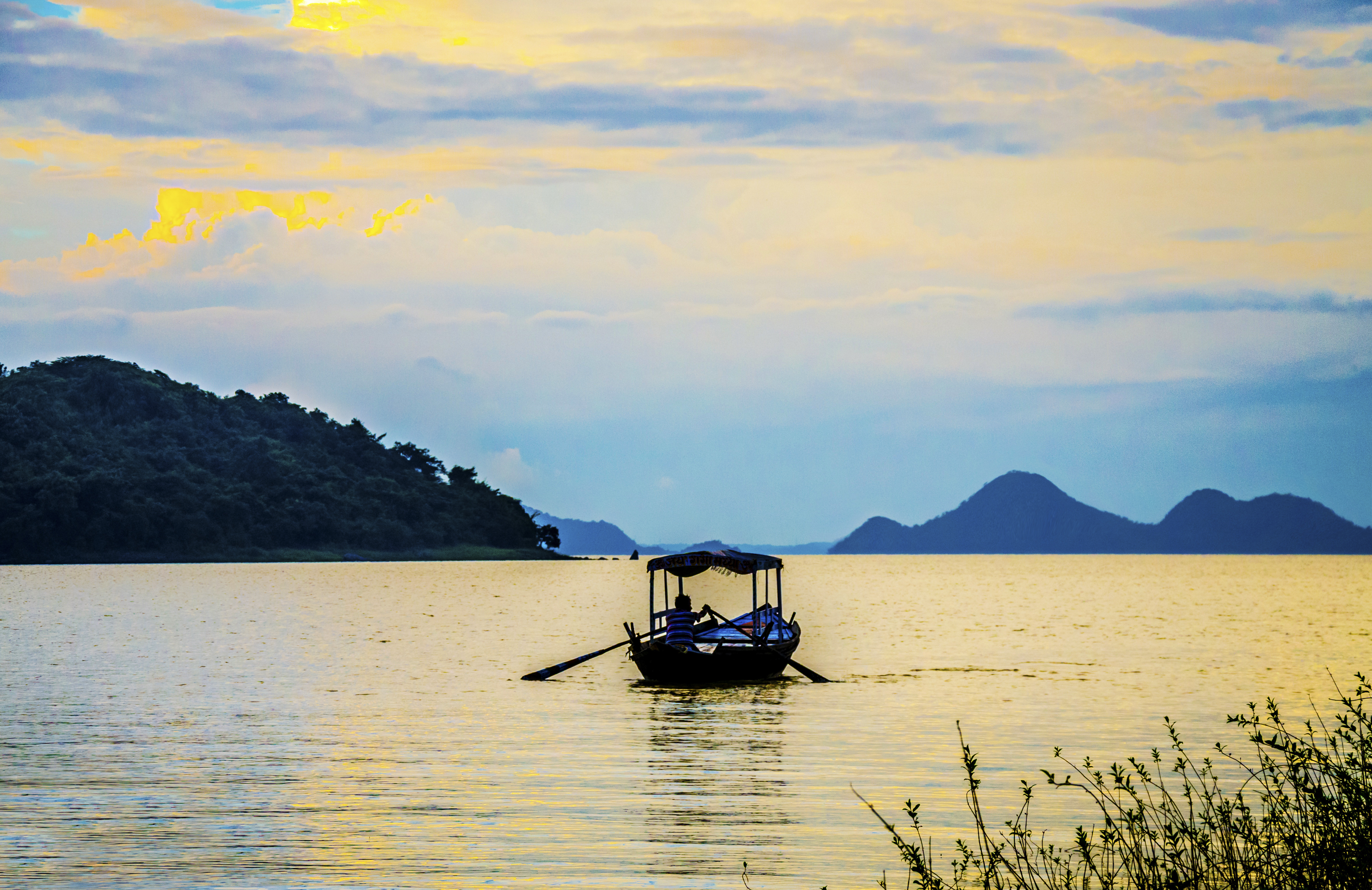
Sunset at Maithon

Maithon Dam, of the Damodar Valley Corporation, constitutes one of the most accomplished and successful river valley projects of India, which was a part of the First Five Year Plan after India's independence. The Damodar Valley region, which Maithon forms a part of, is often hailed as the Ruhr Valley of India.

== Demographics ==
As per the 2011 Census of India, Maithon had a total population of 18,830 of which 9,942 (53%) were males and 8,888 (47%) were females. Population below 6 years was 1,822. The total number of literates in Maithon was 15,611 (91.79% of the population over 6 years).

As of 2001 India census, Maithon had a population of 19,728. Males constitute 53% of the population and females 47%. Maithon has an average literacy rate of 74%, higher than the national average of 59.5%: male literacy is 81%, and female literacy is 67%. In Maithon, 11% of the population is under 6 years of age.

=== Languages ===
Languages spoken in Maithon Town (2011)
1. Hindi (42.5%)
2. Bengali (29.9%)
3. Bhojpuri (9.44%)
4. Magahi (4.44%)
5. Santali (3.19%)
6. Maithili (3.18%)
7. Others (7.30%)

== Infrastructure ==
Maithon has an area of 2.951 km^{2}. It is 42 km from the district headquarters Dhanbad. There is a railway station at Kumardubi 6 km away. Buses are available in the town. It has 25 km roads and both covered and open drains. The two major sources of protected water supply are tap water from treated sources and hand pumps. There are 3,506 domestic electric connections and 400 road light points. Amongst the medical facilities, it has 1 hospital with 150 beds and 10 medicine shops. Amongst the educational facilities, it has 5 primary schools, 5 middle schools, 3 secondary schools, 2 senior secondary schools and 1 general degree college. Amongst the recreational facilities, there is a stadium, an auditorium/ community hall, a library and a reading room. It has branch offices of 3 nationalised banks, 12 agricultural credit societies and 1 non-agricultural credit society.

== Culture ==
The Kalyaneshwari temple 6 km away from the Maithon dam is considered to be the seat to a very powerful deity, Ma Kalyaneshwari. The temple was erected in the early 1900s .

== Education ==
Civil Services Institute Maithon

=== Schools ===
- Kendriya Vidyalaya Maithon Dam
- JNV Nirsha Dhanbad
- De Nobili School, Maithon
- Maithan Public School
- Right Bank High School Maithon
- Left Bank High School
- Left Bank Primary School
- KGBV NIRSA

=== College ===
- Bholaram Shibal Kharkia College, Maithon was established in 1966. Affiliated to Binod Bihari Mahto Koylanchal University, it offers courses in arts, science and commerce.

== See also ==
- Maithon Power Plant
