= Kalyaneshwari Temple =

Hindu temple in Paschim Bardhaman

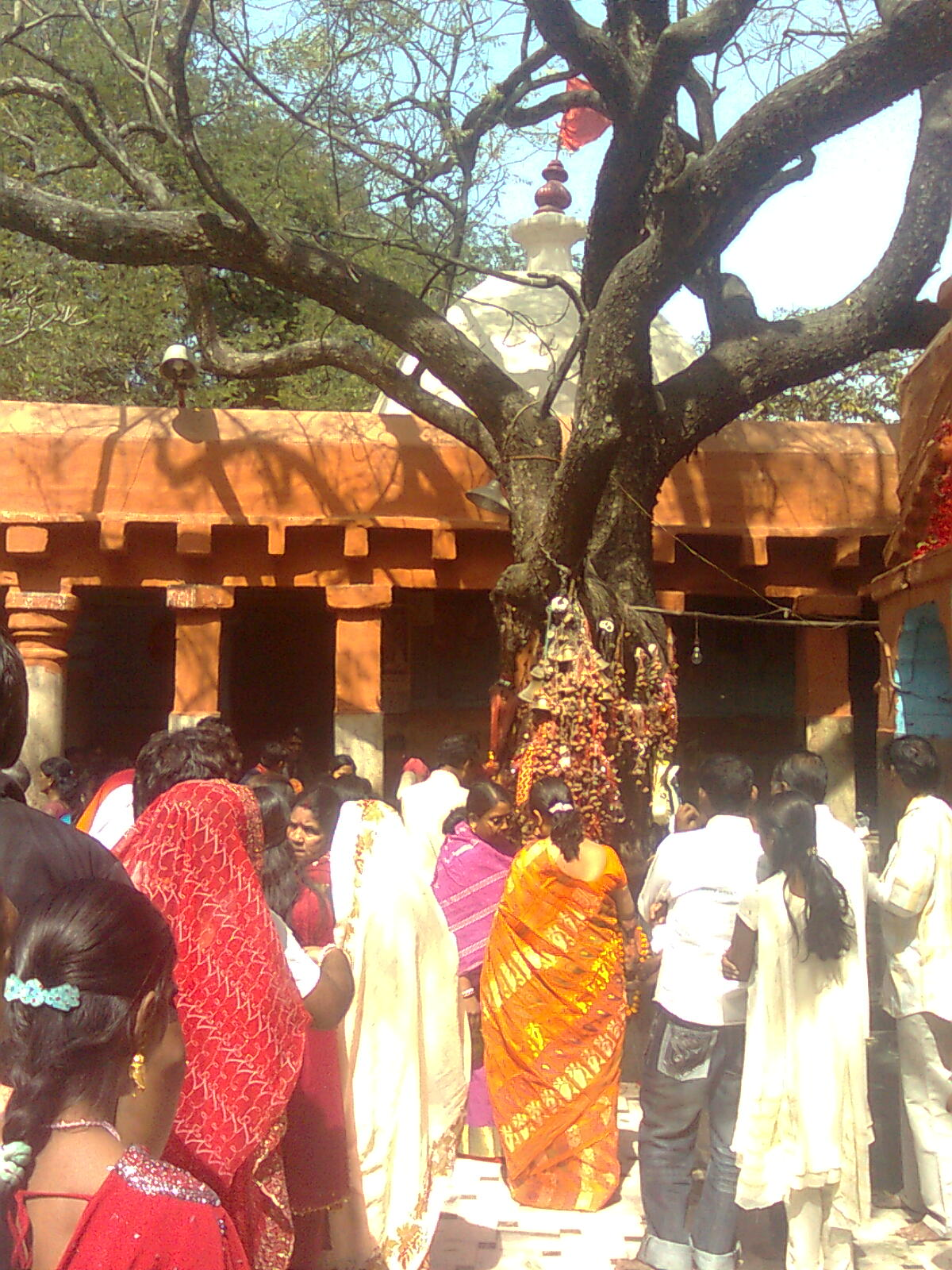
- Kalyaneshwari Temple

- Location in West Bengal Kalyaneshwari Temple (India)

Religion
- Affiliation: Hinduism
- District: Paschim Bardhaman
- Deity: Devi Kalyaneshwari

Location
- Location: Kalyaneshwari, Asansol
- State: West Bengal
- Country: India
- Coordinates: 23°46′38″N 86°49′42″E

Website
- paschimbardhaman.co.in

Cities, towns and ECL Areas in the western portion of Asansol Sadar subdivision in Paschim Bardhaman district
MC: municipal corporation, P: rural administrative centre, CT: census town, N: neighbourhood, OG: out growth, T: temple
Owing to space constraints in the small map, the actual locations in a larger map may vary slightly

Kalyaneshwari temple at Kalyaneshwari in Asansol Sadar subdivision of Paschim Bardhaman district in the Indian state of West Bengal.

== History ==
Kalyaneshwari is a 500-year-old centre of Shakti worship. Legend has it that human sacrifices were offered at Kalyaneshwari in the remote past. The present temple, however, is not very old and was constructed by Sri Gurudin Prasad Pal. The temple of Goddess Kalyaneshwari is believed to fulfill the wishes of childless women.
