= Kumardubi =

Industrial locality in Jharkhand

Kumardubi Kumardhubi
- Neighborhood
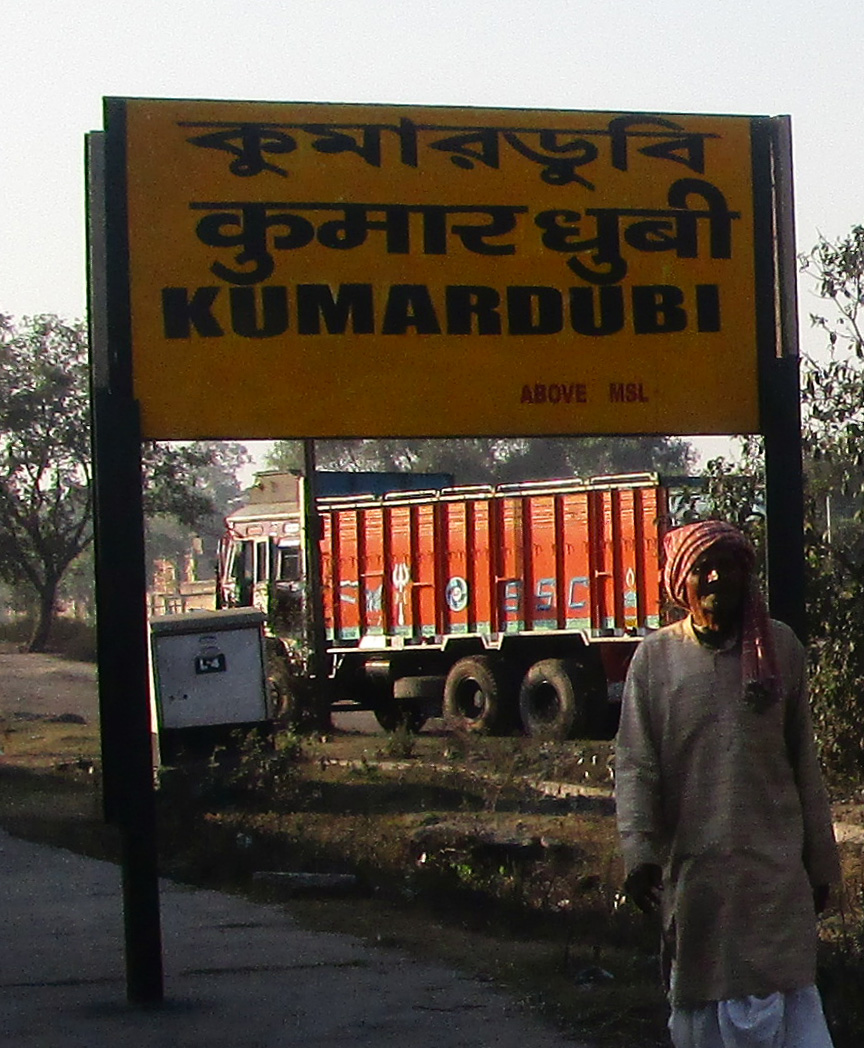

- Location in Jharkhand, India Kumardubi (India)
- Coordinates: 23.7468°N 86.7847°E
- Country: India
- State: Jharkhand
- District: Dhanbad
- Subdivision: Dhanbad Sadar
- CD block: Nirsa

Government
  - Type: Representative Democracy

Languages
  - Official: Hindi, Bengali
- Time zone: UTC+5:30 (IST)
- PIN: 828203
- Vehicle registration: JH
- Nearest city: Asansol
- Lok Sabha Constituency: Dhanbad
- Vidhan Sabha Constituency: Nirsa
- Railway station: Kumardubi railway station

Kumardubi (also spelled Kumardhubi) is an industrial neighbourhood located within the Nirsa CD Block of Dhanbad district, in the Indian state of Jharkhand. Although widely recognized as a distinct industrial locality, Kumardubi is not identified as a separate place or mouza in the 2011 census; maps in the District Census Handbook of Dhanbad indicate that it may be included within Chirkunda.

== Geography ==
Cities, towns and locations in the eastern portion of Dhanbad Sadar subdivision in Dhanbad district
M: Municipality, CT: Census Town, N: Neighbourhood, R: Rural/ Urban centre, D: Dam, P: Power Plant
Owing to space constraints in the small map, the actual locations in a larger map may vary slightly

=== Location ===
Kumardubi is located on the eastern edge of Dhanbad district, close to the border with West Bengal. While the Damodar River flows along the southern boundary, the Barakar River flows along the east.

=== Overview ===
The region shown in the map is a part of the undulating uplands of the eastern coal belt bustling with coalmines.

BCCL operates Chanch/ Victoria Area partially within the region shown in the map. ECL operates Mugma Area fully within the region shown in the map.

The Panchet Dam on the Damodar river and Maithon Dam on the Barakar river, along their reservoirs, are prominent geographical features. The entire area falls under the Nirsa CD block, where approximately 69% of the population lives in rural areas and 31% in urban areas.

== Economy ==
=== Industry ===
Owing to its proximity to the coalfields of Dhanbad and abundant fire clay deposits, Kumardubi has long been recognized as a major industrial hub in eastern India. Key sectors include:

- Refactory and fire bricks: Due to the abundance of fire clay in the region, Kumardubi is known for its numerous fire brick and refractory units. Numerous small and medium units produce these high-temperature-resistant bricks, which supply to steel, cement, and power industries. Before its order to be liquidated in January 1997, Kumardhubi Fireclay & Silica Works Ltd. was a prominent Indian manufacturer of refractories, specifically fire bricks.
- Coal mining: The Kumardhubi Coal Mine, operated by Eastern Coalfields Limited (a subsidiary of Coal India) has a mine area of about 6.67 km^{2}, depth up to 300 m, and produces subbituminous thermal coal. Production figures have varied, with reported output around 0.02–0.06 million tonnes per annum in recent years and a workforce of approximately 429. It is part of ECL's Cluster No. 2 group of underground and opencast coal mines.
- Engineering and manufacturing: Several manufacturing units and small-scale units for stone crushing operate from Kumardubi.
  - The British-era metal casting company, Kumardhubi Metal Casting and Engineering Limited (KMCEL), produced track sections used in underground mines and employed around 850 workers at the time of its closure in 1995. Originally owned by Bird & Company during the British era, Kumardhubi Engineering Works (KEW) was taken over by the Bengal government and run till 1979, after which it was taken over by Bihar State Industrial Development Corporation (BSIDC). It was renamed KMCEL in 1983 with the BSIDC and Tata Steel jointly running it till 1995. At the time, Tata Steel owned 49 per cent stake while BSIDC remained the majority partner with a 51 per cent stake.
  - McNally Bharat Engineering Company Ltd. (MBECL), originally named McNally-Bird Engineering Company Limited, is one of India's leading engineering and turnkey construction companies which operates a manufacturing unit in Kumardubi since 1961. The Kumardubi facility functions as an integrated unit, housing engineering and design, marketing and product support, procurement, manufacturing, assembly, and quality assurance under a single roof. This structure enables the company to provide complete solutions, ranging from design to installation and commissioning, for its customers.
- Saree Refurbishing: Kumardubi is also the hub for the refurbishment of old and used sarees, which are repaired, cleaned and polished, and are sent back to the market for re-selling.

== Transport ==
The Kumardubi area is served by the Kumardubi railway station on the Asansol–Gaya section, which is a part of the Grand Chord, Howrah-Gaya-Delhi line and Howrah-Allahabad-Mumbai line. The station handles both passenger and freight traffic and has historically supported the movement of industrial goods, particularly metal castings and engineering products.

The area is also served by the Grand Trunk Road, now part of NH 19 (old numbering NH 2), running from Agra to Kolkata. This highway provides direct access to major cities like New Delhi, Varanasi, and Kolkata. Local transportation is primarily facilitated by auto rickshaws and private bus services.

== Education ==
Educational institutions in the vicinity include:

- High School, Kumardhubi: Established in 1959, this co-educational school is affiliated to the Jharkhand Academic Council (JAC).
- S.H.M.S. Inter Mahavidyalaya: Established in 1979, this co-educational intermediate/junior college is affiliated to the Jharkhand Academic Council (JAC).
- S.C.P.R.P. Women’s College, Chirkunda: Established in 2005, this women’s intermediate college provides higher secondary education affiliated to the Jharkhand Academic Council (JAC).
- Swami Vivekananda School, Chirkunda: Established in 2007, this co‑educational English‑medium senior secondary school is affiliated to the Central Board of Secondary Education (CBSE).
- Loyola School Taldanga, Chirkunda: Established in 1976, this co‑educational English‑medium senior high school is affiliated to the Council for the Council for the Indian School Certificate Examinations (CISCE).

== Tourism ==
There are a few tourist attractions near Kumardubi:

1. Maithon Dam: Built on the Barakar river, the dam was designed for flood control, generating 60,000 kW of power, and home to South East Asia’s first underground power station. The surrounding Maithon Lake is a popular spot for boating, fishing, and photography
2. Panchet Dam: Built on the Damodar river, the dam offers panoramic views of the Panchet Hill and is a popular picnic spot
3. Kalyaneshwari Temple: Dedicated to Goddess Kalyaneshwari, this 19th century temple located near the Maithon Dam, is a major pilgrimage site for devotees
4. Gopalpur: A small village near the Nirsa-cum-Chirkunda block, famous for an ancient pillar and other historical ruins of the Maurya Empire under emperor Ashoka.
