= Mugma Area =

- Location in Jharkhand Mugma Area (India)
- Location: 23.7761°N 86.7274°E
- Products: Non-coking coal
- Company: Eastern Coalfields Limited
- Website: http://www.easterncoal.gov.in/

Mugma Area is one of the 14 operational areas of Eastern Coalfields Limited located in Dhanbad district in the state of Jharkhand, India.

== Geography ==
Collieries in the Mugma Area of Eastern Coalfields
U: Underground Colliery, O: Open Cast Colliery, C: Combined Underground and Open Cast Collieries, A: Area headquarters

=== Location ===
The Mugma Area is located around 23.7761°N 86.7274°E

The Mugma Area is bounded by the rural areas of Jamtara district on the north, the Sodepur Area of ECL, in Paschim Bardhaman district of West Bengal, across the Barakar, on the east, Raghunathpur subdivision of Purulia district of West Bengal, across the Damodar, on the south, and the Jharia Coalfield on the west. While Maithon Dam, across the Barakar, is in the north-east, Panchet Dam, across the Damodar, is in the south-east.

The map alongside shows some of the collieries in the Area. However, as the collieries do not have individual pages, there are no links in the full screen map.

=== Coal ===
As per the Shodhganga website, the following collieries of the Mugma field function under the Mugma Area of Eastern Coalfields: Chapapur II, Badjna, Nirsa, Mandman, Kapasara, Lakhimata, Kumardhubi, Gopinathpur, Khudia Open Cast, Khudia Under Ground, Shyampur A, Shyampur B, Hariyajam, Rajpura OCP and Barmuri OCP.

As per ECL website telephone numbers, operational collieries in the Mugma Area in 2018 are: Badjna Colliery, Bermury OCP, Chapapur Colliery, Gopinathpur Colliery, Hariajam Colliery, Kumardhubi Colliery, Khoodia Colliery, Kapasara Colliery, Lakhimata Colliery, Mandman Colliery, Rajpura OCP and Shampur B.

The Chanch Victoria Area of BCCL is spread over Jharkhand and West Bengal. The Jharkhand part of the Chanch Victoria Area is located outside the south-eastern part of Mugma Area. While collieries such as Basantimata are still in operation, other collieries such as Chanch have been closed.

Operational Areas of ECL (Source:ENVIS Centre on Environmental Problems of Mining)

== Mining plan ==
Cluster 1, a group of 11 mines, is in the western part of Raniganj Coalfield (west of Barakar River) in the Nirsa CD Block in Dhanbad district of Jharkhand. An overview of the proposed mining activity plan in Cluster 1, in the Mugma Area, as of 2015–16, is as follows:

1. Hariajam underground mine, with normative annual production capacity of 0.11 million tonnes and peak annual production capacity of 0.14 mt, had an expected life of more than 25 years. In Hariajam UG mine extraction of coal was being carried out in the Brindabanpur (BP) seam and Gopinathpur (GP) seam through development panels by the bord and pillar method.
2. Badjna UG mine, with normative annual production capacity of 0.05 mt and peak annual production capacity of 0.10 mt, had an expected life of more than 25 years. In Badjna UG mine extraction of coal was being carried out in the Brindabanpur (BP) seam and Kalimati (KM) seam through development panels by the bord and pillar method.
3. Chapapur II UG mine, with normative annual production capacity of 0.15 mt and peak annual production capacity of 0.20 mt, had an expected life of more than 25 years. Chapapur OC patch had an expected life of 1 year. In Chapapur UG mine extraction of coal was being carried out in the Mehtadih seam and Kalimati (KM) seam. In Kalimati seam, depillaring operation was under progress with caving. In Mehtadih seam, development of pillars was under progress.
4. Khoodia UG mine, with normative annual production capacity of 0.05 mt and peak annual production capacity of 0.10 mt, had an expected life of more than 25 years. Khoodia OC patch had an expected life of 1 year. In Khoodia UG mine extraction of coal was being carried out in the Brindabanpur seam in development phase. Further development work was planned to be done in the top section of Brindabanpur seam and in some portion of Mugma Special seam.

Cities, towns and locations in the eastern portion of Dhanbad Sadar subdivision in Dhanbad district
M: Municipality, CT: census town, N: neighbourhood, R: Rural/ Urban centre, D: Dam, P: Power Plant
Owing to space constraints in the small map, the actual locations in a larger map may vary slightly

5. Lakhimata UG mine, with normative annual production capacity of 0.08 mt and peak annual production capacity of 0.10 mt, had an expected life of more than 25 years. Lakhimata OC patch had an expected life of 8 years. In Lakhimata UG mine extraction of coal was being carried out in the Mugma Special seam and Mehtadih seam through development panels by the board and pillar method.
6. Shampur B UG mine, with normative annual production capacity of 0.09 mt and peak annual production capacity of 0.10 mt, had an expected life of more than 25 years. Shampur B (Sangamahal) OC patch had an expected life of 3 years. Shampur B was in the development phase.
7. Mandman UG mine, with normative annual production capacity of 0.07 mt and peak annual production capacity of 0.10 mt, had an expected life of more than 25 years. Kalimati bottom seam was being worked by the board and pillar method, and was under depillaring (with caving) phase. Preparations for development of pillars in Mehtadih seam had also been taken up. Development virgin patches of Kalimati bottom seam was also planned.
8. Nirsa OC patch, with normative annual production capacity of 0.09 mt and peak annual production capacity of 0.10 mt, had an expected life of more than 11 years.
9. Shampur A UG mine, with normative annual production capacity of 0.05 mt and peak annual production capacity of 0.10 mt, had an expected life of more than 25 years. Shampur A OC patch had an expected life of 2 years.
10. Gopinathpur UG mine, with normative annual production capacity of 0.05 mt and peak annual production capacity of 0.10 mt, had an expected life of more than 25 years. Gopinathpur OC patch had an expected life of 5 years.
11. Kapasara UG mine, with normative annual production capacity of 0.10 mt and peak annual production capacity of 0.15 mt, had an expected life of more than 25 years. Kapasara OC patch had an expected life of 5 years.

An overview of the proposed mining activity plan in Cluster 2, a group of 3 mines in the Mugma Area, as of 2015–16, is as follows:

1. Kumardhubi UG mine, with normative annual production capacity of 0.08 mt and peak annual production capacity of 0.10 mt, had an expected life of more than 20 years. Kumardhubi is a pre-nationalisation mine. SP top seam was being developed by the bord and pillar method, with entry through BL Incline. Another small patch at SP top seam was being developed by the same method, with entry through Pit No. 2.
2. Barmuri OC mine, with normative annual production capacity of 0.18 mt and peak annual production capacity of 0.23 mt, had an expected life of more than 10 years. Kalimati seam was being worked in this mine.
3. Rajpura OC mine, with normative annual production capacity of 0.10 mt and peak annual production capacity of 0.12 mt, had an expected life of more than 5 years. Kalimati seam was being worked but very little reserve is left. Moreover, the mine faces land constraints owing to presence of densely populated area, Eastern Railway Grand Chord line, Grand Trunk Road etc. Progress in Rajpura OC is limited.

== Illegal mining ==
Mines abandoned, after economic extraction is over, are the main sources of illegal mining, which is generally done in small patches in a haphazard manner and mining sites keep on changing. Illegal mining leads to roof falling, water flooding, poisonous gas leaking, leading to the death of many labourers. As per the Ministry of Coal, Government of India, there are 203 illegal mining sites in ECL spread over Satgram, Sripur, Salanpur, Sodepur, Kunstoria, Pandveshwar, Mugma, Santhal Parganas Mines and Rajmahal.

== Land subsidence and fire ==
Rampant illegal mining in the pits abandoned by BCCL and ECL in the Jharkhand-West Bengal border regions has assumed alarming proportions threatening both rail and road connections in the region. According to the DGMS, there are at least 22 villages and a few industrial towns, with an estimated population of a million, virtually dangling over empty pits. Illegal miners leave behind the pits vacant after taking out the coal. BCCL and ECL, who have filled up some abandoned pits in Sripur, Sodepur, Kajora, Salanpur and Mugma Areas, do not have funds to fill up large number of abandoned pits. A comprehensive rehabilitation package is estimated at Rs. 15,000 crore. There have been incidents of land subsidence all over the region. In 2015, a section of the road connecting Kapasara Open Cast Project caved in.

Another major problem is fire in the abandoned mines. One such mine at Brindabanpur, 50 m from NH 19 and 100 m from the Grand Chord railway track, was on fire in 2014. Woken up by the noise of explosions, the residents alerted the Mugma Area offices of ECL. They came and took action to extinguish the fire and fill up the abandoned mine. As a precautionary measure 650 workers of ECL's adjoining Lakhimata Colliery were evacuated.

== Transport ==
The Asansol–Gaya section, which is a part of Howrah-Gaya-Delhi line and Howrah-Allahabad-Mumbai line passes through the Mugma Area.

The old Grand Trunk Road passes through the Mugma Area. NH 19 (old numbering NH 2), running from Agra to Kolkata, leaves GT Road at near Brindabanpur and passes mostly outside the crowded towns and mining areas and rejoins GT Road after Asansol.

== See also ==
- Chanch/ Victoria Area of BCCL functioning in the same region.
