= Panchet Dam =

Dam in Jharkhand,Purulia district, West Bengal, India

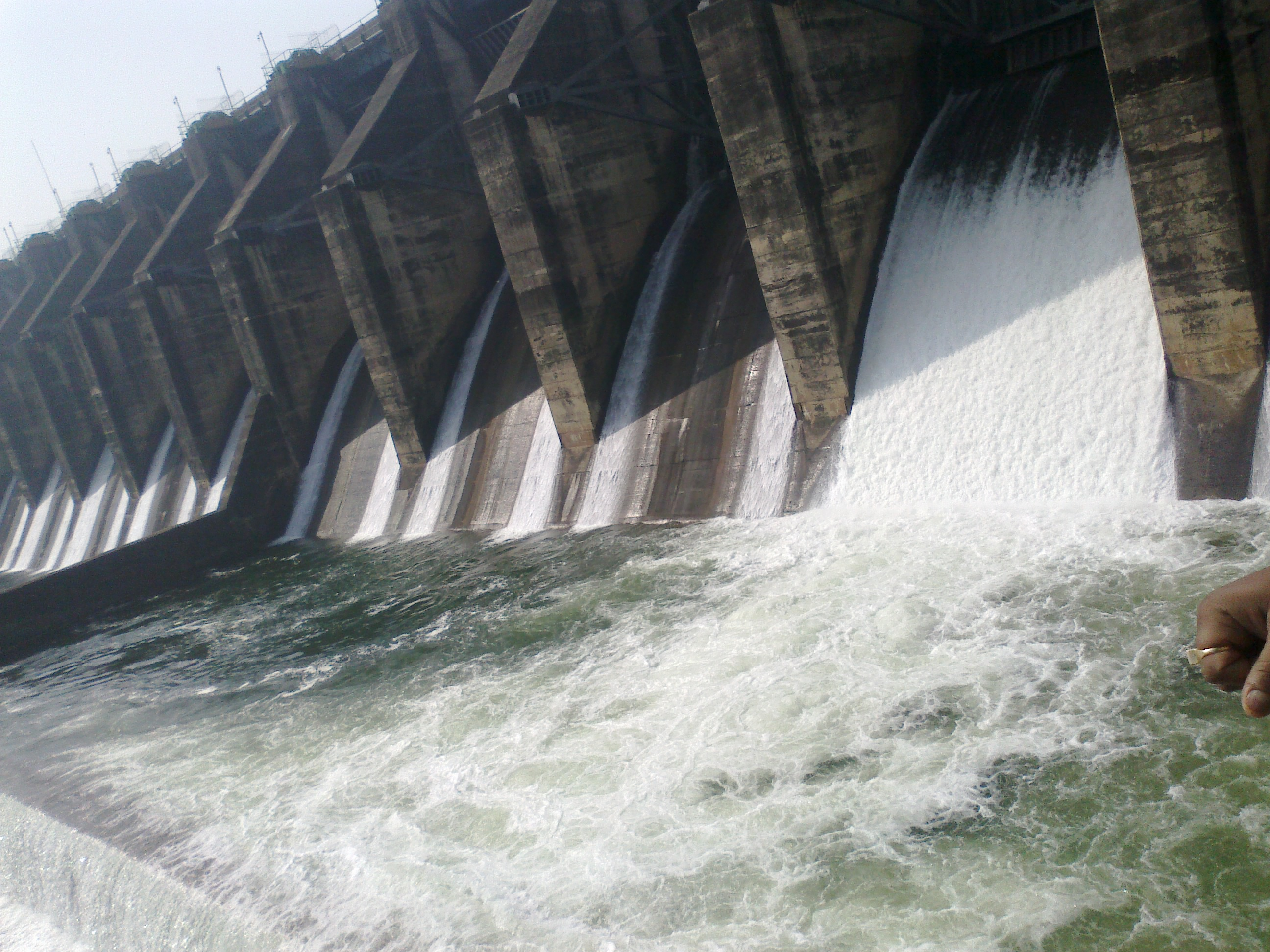
- Panchet Dam in 2013

- Location in Jharkhand
- Official name: Panchet Dam
- Country: India
- Location: Dhanbad district, Jharkhand and Purulia district, West Bengal
- Coordinates: 23°40′55″N 86°44′52″E
- Status: Functional
- Opening date: 6 December 1959
- Owner: Damodar Valley Corporation

Dam and spillways
- Type of dam: Earthen Dam with concrete Spillway
- Impounds: Damodar River
- Height: 45.00 metres (147.64 ft)
- Length: 6,777 metres (22,234 ft)
- Width (base): 10.67 metres (35.0 ft)
- Spillway type: concrete spillway
- Spillway capacity: 17853 m^{3}/s

Reservoir
- Creates: Panchet reservoir
- Active capacity: 1497.54 million m^{3}
- Inactive capacity: 170.37 million m^{3}
- Surface area: 27.92 km^{2}

Power Station
- Operator: Damodar Valley Corporation
- Installed capacity: 2x40 MW

Panchet Dam was the last of the four multi-purpose dams included in the first phase of the Damodar Valley Corporation (DVC). It was constructed across the Damodar River at Panchet in Dhanbad district in the Indian state of Jharkhand, and opened in 1959.

== DVC overview ==
Cities, towns and locations in the eastern portion of Dhanbad Sadar subdivision in Dhanbad district
M: Municipality, CT: Census town, N: Neighbourhood, R: Rural/ Urban centre, D: Dam, P: Power Plant
Owing to space constraints in the small map, the actual locations in a larger map may vary slightly

As a result of the catastrophic flood of 1943, the Governor of Bengal appointed the Damodar Flood enquiry committee to suggest remedial measures. It suggested creating an authority similar to that of the Tennessee Valley Authority in the United States. W.L.Voorduin, senior engineer of TVA prepared a preliminary report that outlined a plan designed to achieve flood control, irrigation, power generation and navigation. As a result, Damodar Valley Corporation came into existence in 1948 for development and management of the basin as a whole. While Voorduin envisaged the construction of eight dams and a barrage, it was later decided to have only four dams at Tilaiya, Konar, Maithon and Panchet, and Durgapur Barrage.

The first dam was built across the Barakar River at Tilaiya and inaugurated in 1953. Two years later, in 1955, the second dam across the Konar River was inaugurated. The third dam across the Barakar at Maithon was inaugurated in 1957, and the fourth dam across the Damodar at Panchet was inaugurated in 1959.

== Location ==
The Damodar forms the border between Dhanbad district of Jharkhand and Purulia district of West Bengal, before meeting the Barakar at Dishergarh and flowing fully through West Bengal. Panchet Dam has been constructed a little above its confluence with the Barakar. While Dhanbad district is on the northern bank of Panchet reservoir, Purulia district is on the southern bank. Panchet Hill rises above Panchet Dam.

Panchet Dam is 9 kilometres (5.6 mi) from Chirkunda on Grand Trunk Road, and 54 kilometres (34 mi) from Dhanbad. It is 20 kilometres (12 mi) from Asansol. The nearest railway station is at Kumardubi, 10 kilometres (6.2 mi) away, on the Grand Chord line.

== Details of the dam ==
The Panchet Dam is an earthen dam with concrete spillway. It has a catchment area of 10,961 square kilometres (4,232 sq mi). The average annual rainfall is 114 centimetres (45 in) and average annual run off is 4,540 m^{3} (160,000 cu ft). At the dam site the maximum observed flood (June 1949) was 8,558 m^{3} (302,200 cu ft) per second. For the project the spillway design flood that was adopted was 17,853 m^{3} (630,500 cu ft) per second. Two units of 40 MW have been installed for power generation.

The four DVC dams are capable of moderating floods of 651,000 cu ft/s (18,400 m^{3}/s) to 250,000 cu ft/s (7,100 m^{3}/s).

The Panchet Dam has an effective storage capacity of 169,000,000 m^{3} (6.0×10^{9} cu ft) or 6TMCft. The reservoir covers an area of 27.92 km^{2} (10.78 sq mi) at dead storage level, 121.81 km^{2} (47.03 sq mi) at maximum conservation pool and 153.38 km^{2} (59.22 sq mi) at top of gates.

Salient features of Panchet Reservoir:

| | Elevation (m) | Storage (million m^{3}) |
|---|---|---|
| Minimum draw down level | 119.50 | 170.26 |
| Spillway crest | 123.47 | 312.15 |
| Maximum conservation pool | 125.00 | 392.36 |
| Maximum flood control pool | 132.62 | 1058.62 |
| Full and maximum pool | 135.67 | 1475.65 |
| Top of dam | 139.33 | |

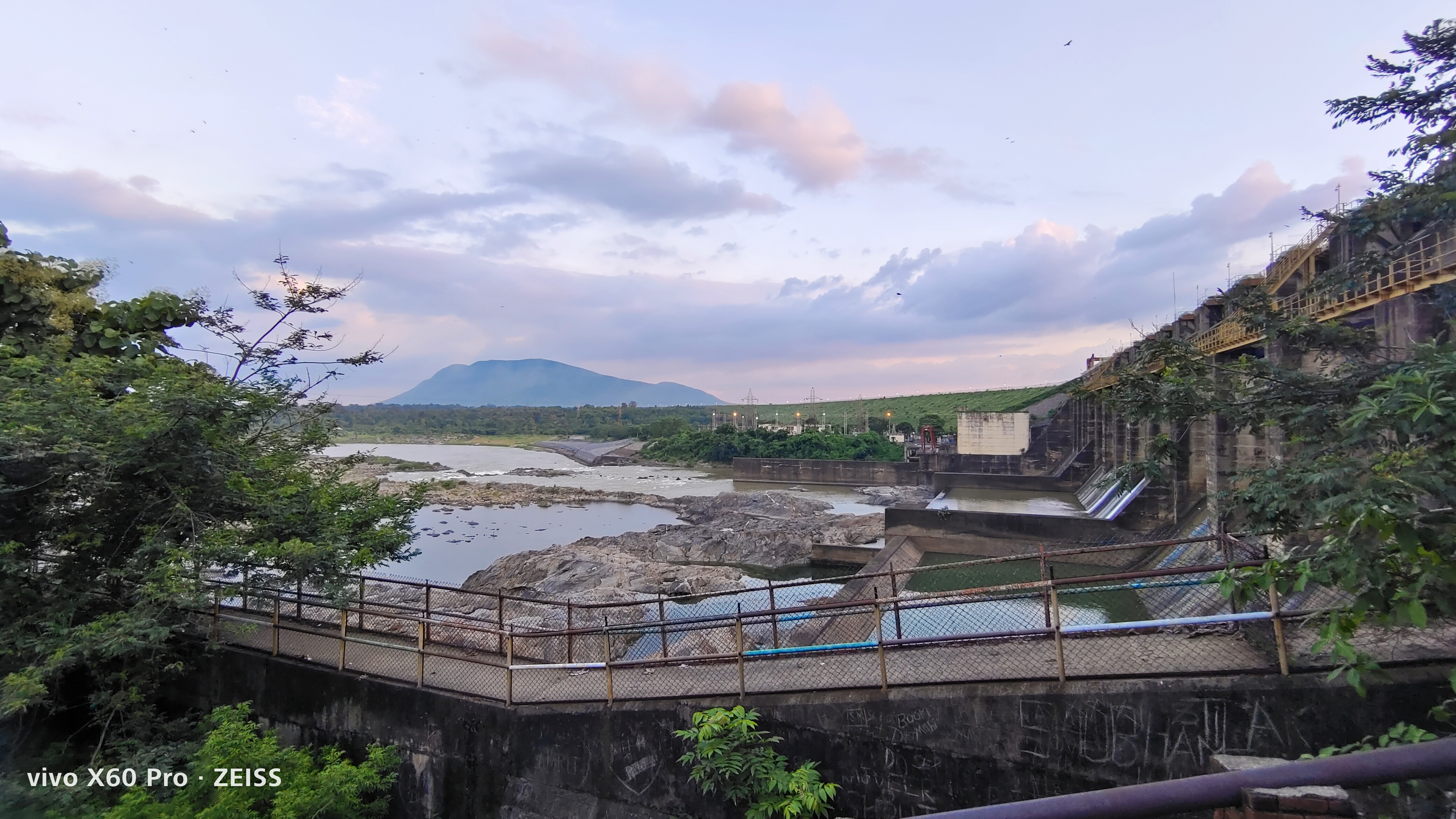
Panchet Dam in Summers

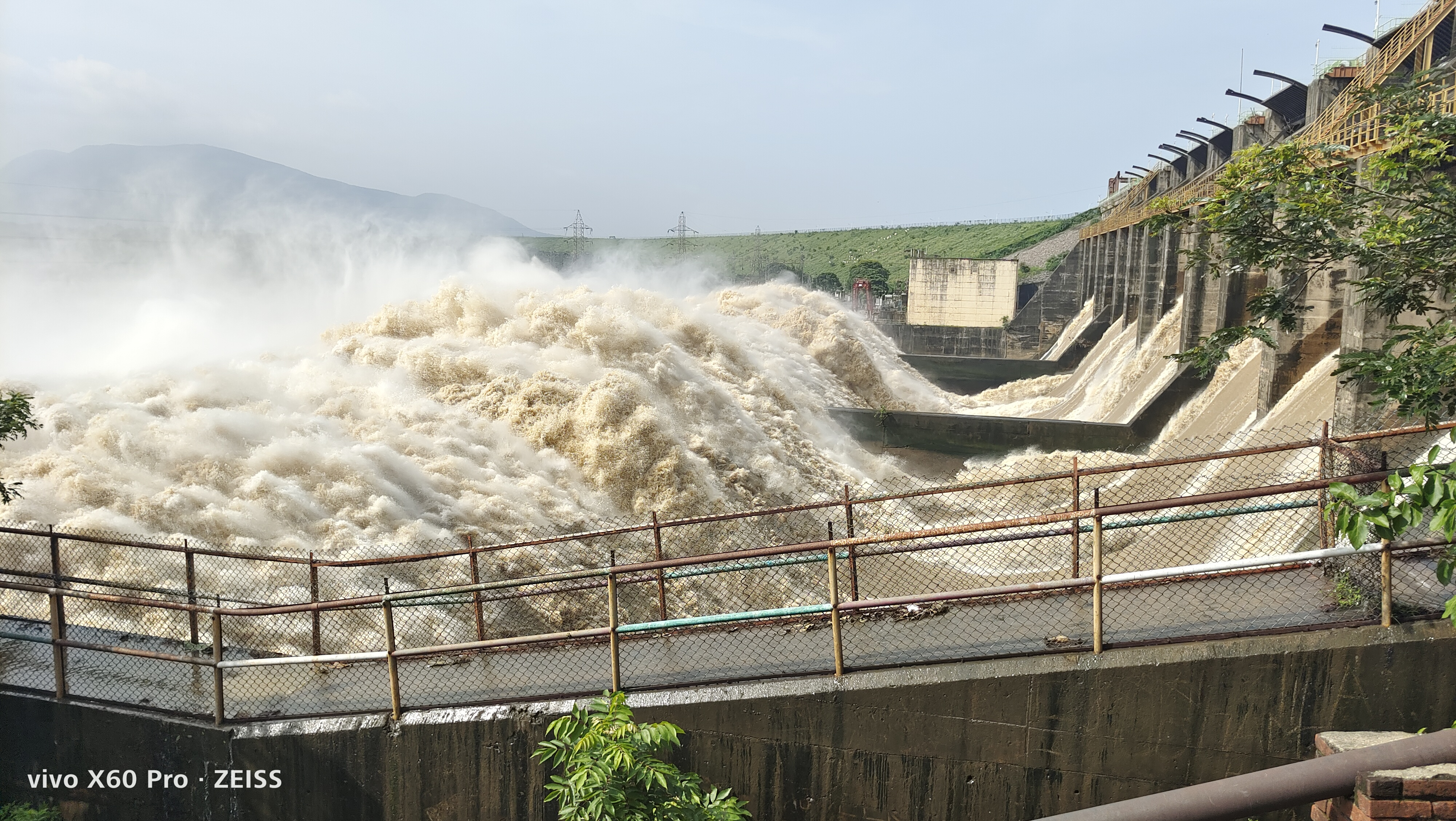
Panchet Dam in Monsoons

== Historical ruins ==
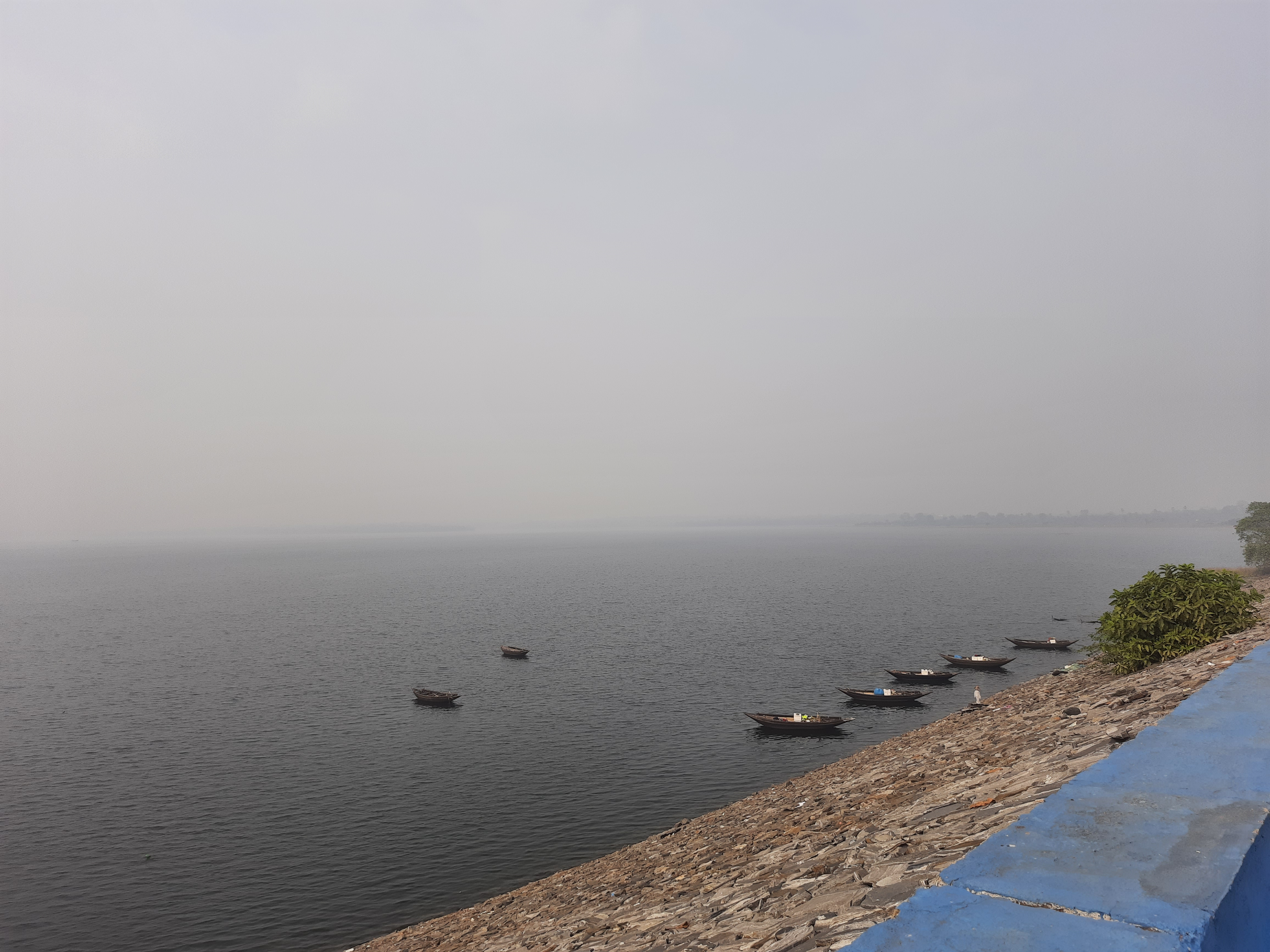
Reservoir of Panchet Dam

Telkupi, a village under Raghunathpur police station, was submerged with the construction of Panchet Dam. Telkupi was capital of Tilakampa Kingdom, of which Panchakot Raj was probably a part. The ruins of the garh (fort) of the Singh Deo dynasty of Panchakot located at the southern foothills and a group of temples are still standing as mute spectators of the rise and fall of the dynasty. J.D.Beglar who visited Telkupi in 1902 described it as 'containing, perhaps, the finest and largest number of temples within a small space that is to be found in the Chota Nagpur Circle in Bengal'. He listed over twenty temples and referred to several others and to 'numerous mounds, both of brick and stone’. Telkupi dates back to the 1st century AD. The temples submerged at Telkupi were Jain temples.

== Inauguration impact ==
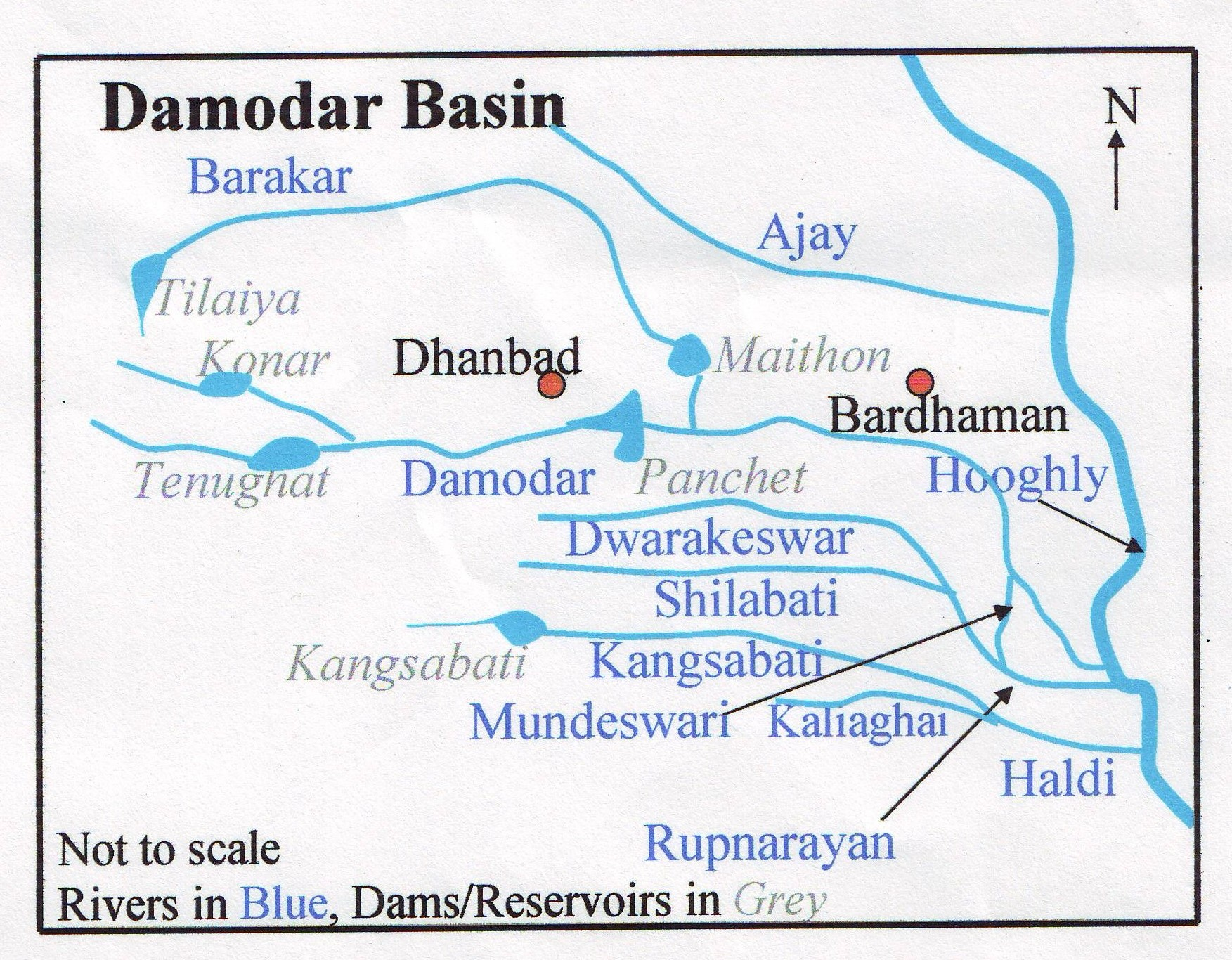
Damodar Basin

In 1959, Jawaharlal Nehru, then Prime Minister of India, was invited to inaugurate the newly constructed Panchet Dam. The officials selected two project workers, fifteen-year-old Santhal girls Budhni Mejhan and Robon Majhi, to welcome the Prime Minister. Budhni Mejhan formally garlanded Nehru. When Budhni returned home to her village of Karbona, the village elders told her that since she had garlanded Nehru, she had effectively "married" him; and since Nehru wasn't a Santhal, she had married outside the community. As result of this "crime", she was chased out of the village and shunned by her family and neighbours. Later she found refuge in the house of Panchet resident Sudhir Dutta and had a daughter by him; the daughter is also rejected by the Santhal community. In 1962, the DVC fired Budhni from her staff position. In 1985, then Prime Minister Rajiv Gandhi reinstated her at the DVC, but she and her daughter remain outcasts from their village.

== Impact of dam construction ==
The Damodar was once an endemic flood-prone river. The Maithon and Panchet dams, constructed in 1957 and 1959 respectively, have significantly reduced daily and annual discharge and also largely eliminated the extremes of flow so that ten-year recurrence interval floods have been reduced to half. Sediment trapping in reservoirs and the lack of flushing due to reduced peak discharge have inevitably transformed the lower Damodar basin into an ecologically imbalanced area.

and about the dangers of large-scale intervention in nature.

== Solar Panel Installation ==
There are plans to generate a total of 155 MW electricity from solar energy at Panchet Dam. 105 MW solar floating panels will be installed on the dam water. 50 MW (ground mounted) solar roof top panels will be installed above the ground. Electricity generation from solar energy will begin here 2025.

== Fish culture ==
The Panchet reservoir is rather poor in terms of total dissolved salts as reflected by the specific conductivity values of 12.33 to 19 μmhos. Dissolved oxygen is low (0.66 to 2.8 mg 1-1) and the pH values range between 7.23 and 7.67. The reservoir was stocked only in 1958. The occurrence of catla, rohu, mrigal and L. calbasu in the fishery, without stocking indicates that the carps now reproduce in the reservoir.
