= Chanch/ Victoria Area =

- Location in Jharkhand Chanch/ Victoria Area (India)

Location
- Location: Jharkhand, West Bengal, India; 23.6345°N 86.4506°E

Production
- Products: Coking coal

Owner
- Company: Bharat Coking Coal Limited
- Website: http://www.bcclweb.in/
- Acquired: 1971-72

Chanch/ Victoria Area is one of the 12 operational areas of BCCL located in Dhanbad Sadar subdivision of Dhanbad district in the state of Jharkhand, and in Asansol Sadar subdivision of Paschim Bardhaman district in West Bengal, both in India.

== Geography ==
Collieries in the Chanch/ Victoria Area of BCCL
U: Underground colliery, O: Open Cast colliery, M: Mixed colliery, W: Washery, F: Facility, A: Administrative headquarters
Owing to space constraints in the small map, the actual locations in a larger map may vary slightly

=== Location ===
The Chanch/ Victoria Area covers an area of 32 km^{2} and is spread over the states of Jharkhand and West Bengal.

Note:The map alongside shows some of the collieries in the Area. However, as the collieries do not have individual pages, there are no links in the full screen map. In the map placed further down, all places marked in the map are linked in the larger full screen map.

== Background ==
Before nationalisation in 1972, the mines were owned and operated by private companies such as Bengal Coal Co. Ltd., Katras Jharia Coal Co. Ltd., New Birbhum Coal Co., Oriental Coal Co. Ltd., Brahmadev Sinha & Co., East Chaptoria Coal Co., East Ramnagar Colliery, Md. Yusuf and others. After nationalisation BCCL reorganised the mines as follows:

In Jharkhand

- Basantimata, East Palasha, Jamdohi Basantimata, Palasia and Shri Raghunathji collieries were reorganised as Basantimata colliery. It was an underground mine.
- Dahibari and Ramkrishna collieries were reorganised as Dahibari-Basantimata colliery. It was an open cast mine.
- Junkundar open cast mine was reorganised as New Laikdih open cast project.
- Laikdih Deep colliery remained as Laikdih Deep colliery. It was an underground mine.
- Chanch colliery remained as Chanch colliery. It was an underground mine.

In West Bengal

- East Ramnagar, Chaptoria, Borira and Damagoria collieries were reorganised as Damagoria colliery. While East Ramnagar was an underground mine, the other three were open cast mines.
- Beguina, an underground mine, remained as Begunia colliery.
- Victoria West, un underground mine, remained Victoria West colliery.
- Victoria, an underground mine, remained as Victoria colliery.

The Chanch/ Victoria Area has a mineable reserve of 333.40 million tonnes.

== Mining plan ==
Cities, towns and locations in the eastern portion of Dhanbad Sadar subdivision in Dhanbad district
M: Municipality, CT: census town, N: neighbourhood, R: Rural/ Urban centre, D: Dam, P: Power Plant
Owing to space constraints in the small map, the actual locations in a larger map may vary slightly
- An overview of the proposed mining activity plan in Cluster XVI, a group of 5 mines (2 operating and 3 closed) in the Chanch/ Victoria Area, as of 2013, is as follows:

1.Dahibari Basantimata colliery, with an open cast mine, has a normative production capacity of 1.3 million tonnes per year and a peak production capacity of 1.69 million tonnes per year. It had an expected life of 16 years.

2.Basantimata colliery, with an underground mine, has a normative production capacity of 0.21 million tonnes per year and a peak production capacity of 0.273 million tonnes per year. It had an expected life of 24 years.

3. New Laikdih open cast project is closed.

4.Laikdih Deep underground mine is closed.

5.Chanch underground mine is closed.

There was a proposal for Dahibari washery, with a capacity of 1.6 million tonnes per year, within New Laikdih lease hold area.

- An overview of the proposed mining activity plan in Cluster XVII in the Chanch/ Victoria Area, as of 2013, is as follows:

1.Begunia colliery is closed for production since 2013.

2.Victoria West colliery is closed for production since 1996 because of mine fire.

3.Victoria colliery is closed for production since 1989 because of mine fire and subsequently inundated.

4. Damagoria colliery is closed since 2010.

5. Proposed Kalyaneswari open cast project, located within the lease hold area of Victoria and Damagoria collieries, with a normative production of 4.0 million tonnes per year, peak production of 5.20 million tonnes per year, and an expected life of 33 years.

There was a proposal for Kalyaneswari washery with an annual capacity of 3.65 million tonnes per year.

== Mine fire and subsidence ==
In the following mines production has been discontinued or mines have been abandoned because of mine fire: Victoria colliery (abandoned in 1989), Laikdih Deep colliery (Laikdih seam discontinued in 1986) and Victoria West colliery (Laikdih seam discontinued in 2001).

As a result of old workings in the pre-nationalisation period there has been subsidence in certain areas and are covered under Jharia Action Plan: Barakar township, near Heslop pit in Victoria colliery, a part of Baltoria village in the vicinity of Victoria West colliery and a portion of Doomurkonda village and some quarters of Laikdih colliery in the vicinity of Laikdih Deep colliery.

== Transport ==
The Asansol–Gaya section, which is a part of Howrah-Gaya-Delhi line and Howrah-Allahabad-Mumbai line passes through the Chanch/ Victoria Area.

The old Grand Trunk Road passes through the Chanch/ Victoria Area. NH 19 (old numbering NH 2), running from Agra to Kolkata, leaves GT Road at near Brindabanpur and passes mostly outside the crowded towns and mining areas and rejoins GT Road after Asansol.

== See also ==
Mugma Area and Salanpur Area of ECL functioning in the same area.
