= Maithon Dam =

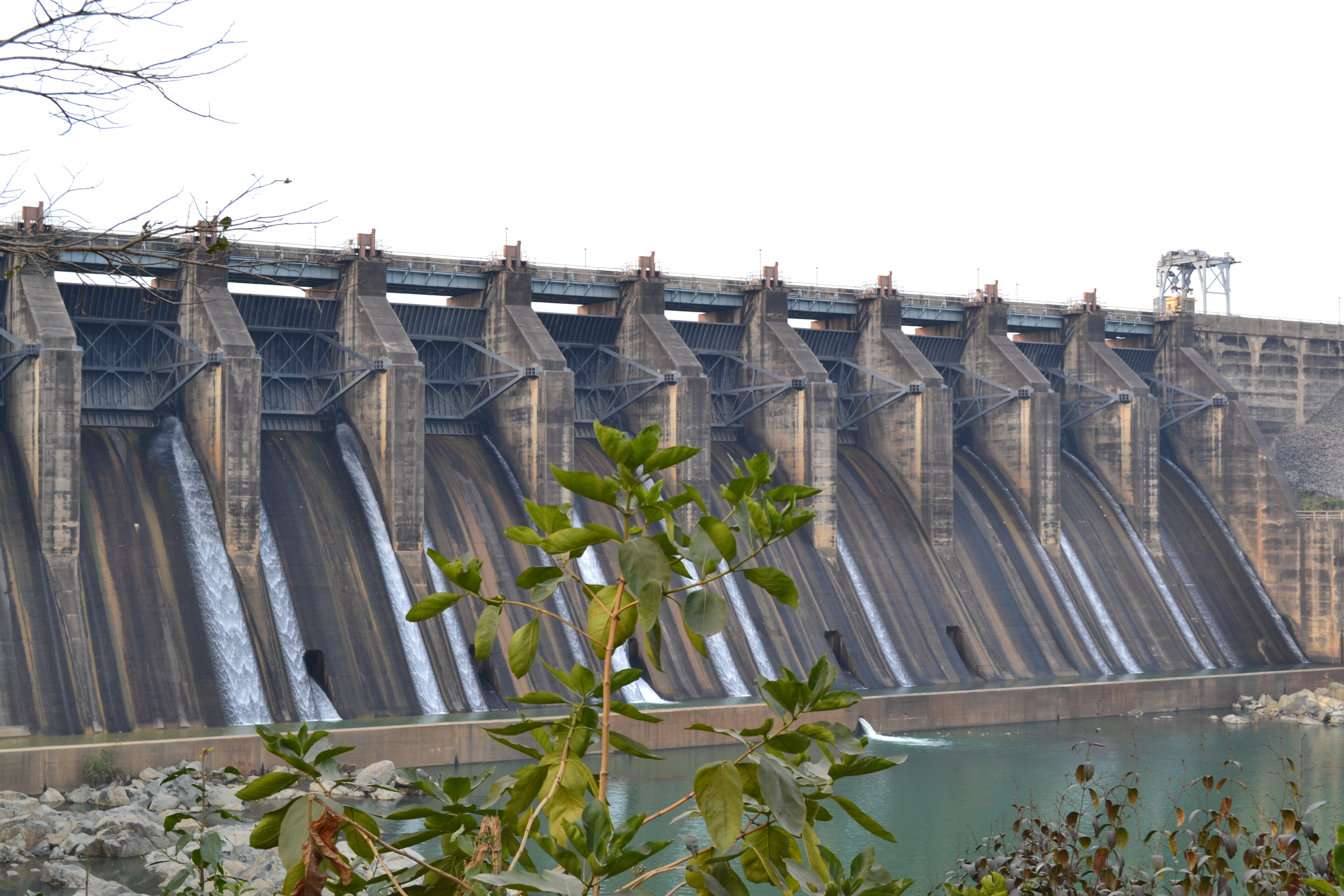

- Location in Jharkhand
- Country: India
- Location: Dhanbad District, Jharkhand and Paschim Bardhaman District of, West Bengal
- Coordinates: 23°51′1″N 86°46′40″E
- Status: Functional
- Opening date: 1957
- Owner: Damodar Valley Corporation

Dam and spillways
- Impounds: Barakar River
- Height: 165 ft (50 m)
- Length: 15,712 ft (4,789 m)
- Width (base): 10.67 metres (35.0 ft)

Reservoir
- Creates: Maithon Lake
- Surface area: 65 square kilometres (25 mi^{2})

Power Station
- Operator: Damodar Valley Corporation

The Maithon Dam is located at Maithon, 48 km from Dhanbad, in the state of Jharkhand India.It is just 24 km from Asansol city and one of the topmost visited place in Asansol region. 15,712 ft (4,789 m) long and 165 ft (50 m) high.

Maithon Dam is 194 km away from Ranchi. It is one of the biggest dams in Jharkhand. This dam is built on the Barakar River. The underground power station present here is the main center of attraction for tourists. Maithon Dam is known for its natural environment and religious importance.

This dam was specially designed for flood control and generates 60,000 kW of electric power. There is an underground power station, the first of its kind in the whole of South East Asia. The dam is constructed on the Barakar River. The lake is spread over 65 square kilometres (25 mi^{2}).

== Damodar Valley Corporation ==
Cities, towns and locations in the eastern portion of Dhanbad Sadar subdivision in Dhanbad district
M: Municipality, CT: Census town, N: Neighbourhood, R: Rural/ Urban centre, D: Dam, P: Power Plant
Owing to space constraints in the small map, the actual locations in a larger map may vary slightly

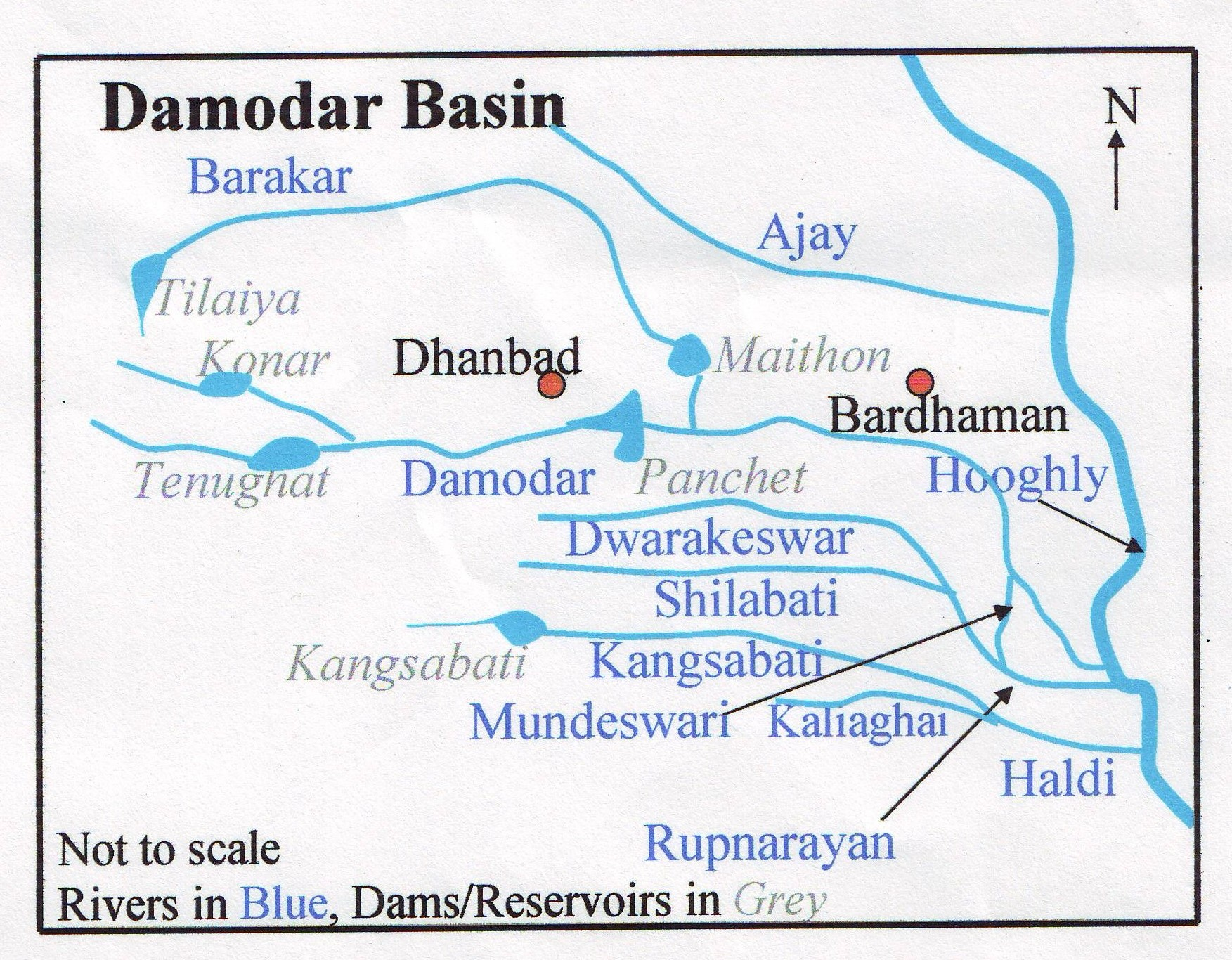
Damodar Basin

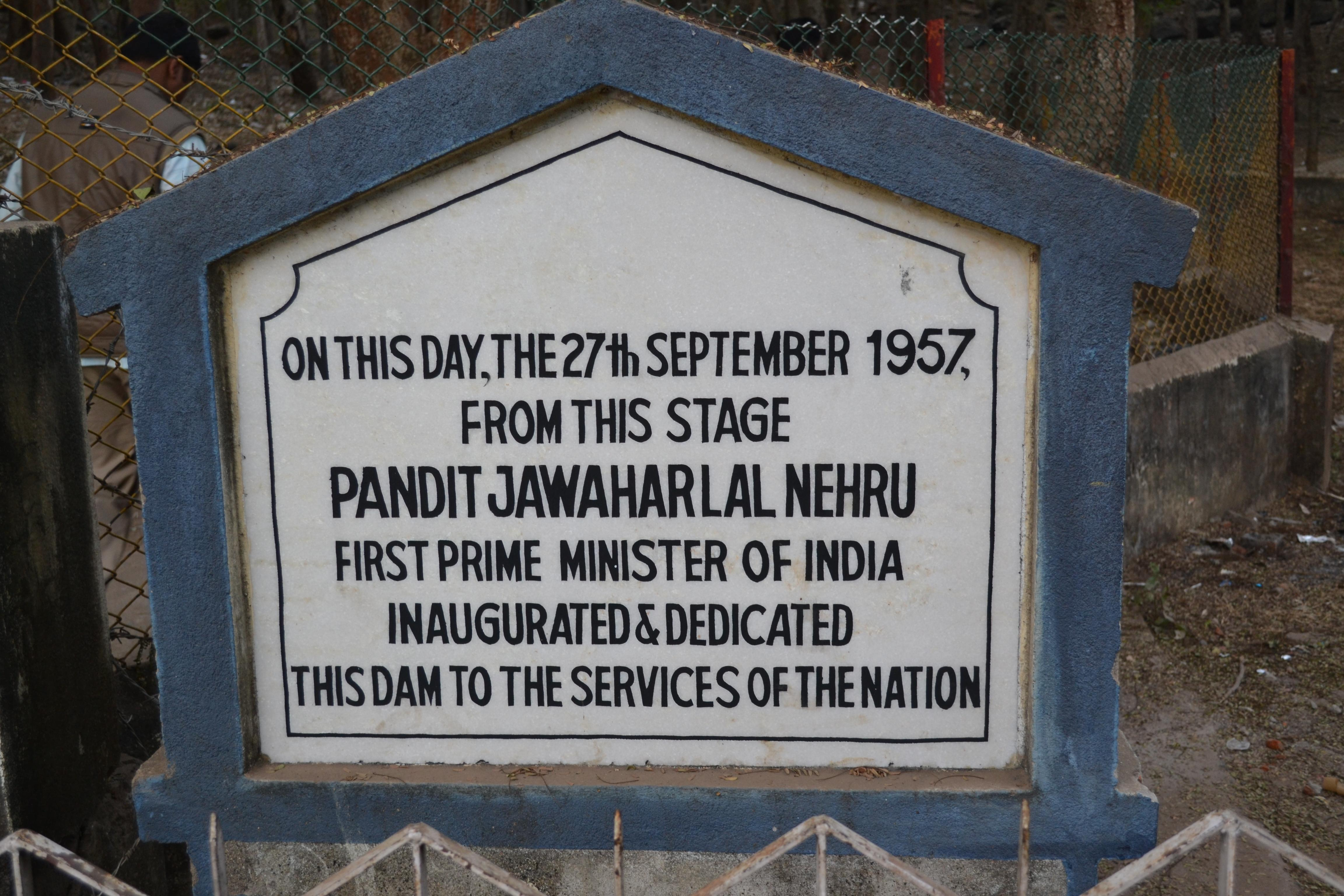
Inauguration plaque of Maithon Dam

The chief ministers of Bihar and West Bengal, Dr. Srikrishna Sinha and Dr. Bidhan Chandra Roy, persuaded central government about the benefits of this mega project. DVC is the first-ever multipurpose river valley project of independent India it came into being on July 7, 1948, by an act of Constituent Assembly (Act no. XIV of 1948). The Damodar Valley Corporation (DVC) has its command area of approx 24,235 km^{2} spreading across the Damodar basin. The upper valley consists of two entire districts (Dhanbad and Bokaro) and eight districts partly in the state of Jharkhand. The lower valley on the other hand consists of five districts partly (Burdwan, Hooghly, Bankura, Howrah and Purulia) in the state of West Bengal.

DVC was set up with the intent of promoting and operating the schemes which may cause social and economic uplift in the valley region.

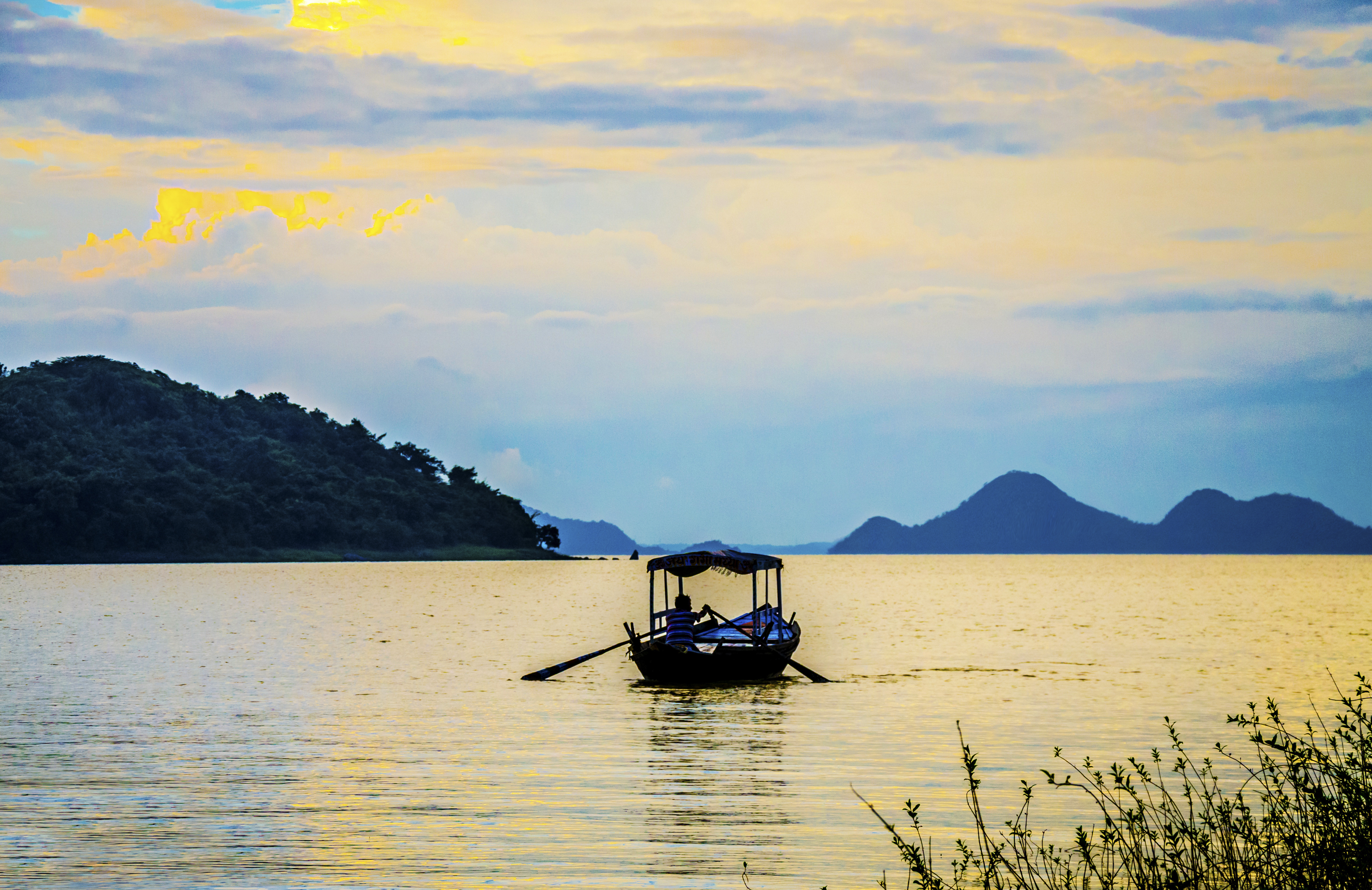
Sunset at Maithon dam

== Prospects and opportunities ==
Proficient management of water resources through dams, canals and barage, DVC facilitated irrigation as well as industrial and domestic water supply which at large benefited the region as a whole. DVC has been generating, transmitting & distributing electrical energy since 1953 and has succeeded not only in meeting the expectation of consumers but has also elevated its height in its performance. The full form of DVC is Damodar valley corporation and since it uses its main source of water from the Damodar dam it is named so.

Recently it has collaborated with TATA Power and a thermal power project has been started, named Maithon Power Limited (MPL). Earlier DVC had installed few Gas Turbines for generation of electricity, a unique technology in the entire region introduced for the very first time in Maithon. They are no more functional now.

DVC has provided employment to thousands of families and is continuing to do so. It also provides facility for engineering and management graduates to undergo training in their respective fields.

== Maithon ==
48 km from Dhanbad, Maithon is termed as mother's abode. It has the biggest reservoir in DVC. It has been designed for flood control & generates 60,000 kW of electric power. It is built on the river Barakar.

It has its unique underground power station, the first of its kind in South Asia. The lake is spread over an area of 65 km^{2}. It is 15,712 ft (4,789 m). long & 165 ft (50 m) high.

The dam's mission comprises:

flood Control
promotion & operation of schemes for irrigation
water supply for domestic & industrial use
navigation & drainage
generation, transmission & distribution of electrical energy.

== History ==
In 1942, during the course of World War II, a flood occurred in the Damodar valley region that cut Calcutta off from the rest of the country for a period of 10 weeks. Soon the government sprang into action & called Mr. W.L.Voord, a civil engineer of Tennessee Valley Authority (TVA). He designed the plan of the dams by 1945. Finally the first dam of independent India came up on July 7, 1953, at Tilaiya. Soon Konar, Maithon & Panchet Dam followed in its footsteps in 1955, 1957 and 1959 respectively.

== Operation ==
Damodar river is a seasonal river, basically 82% of which is filled up by rainfall in July–September. 1 June to 31 October is the filling period during which rainwater is stored and the stored rainwater is used for irrigation by the downstream areas of Burdwan, hydroelectric power generation and scores of other activities.

== Maithon Hydel ==
Maithon Hydel Power Station (MHPS) is located on the river Barakar about 12.9 km above its confluence with the Damodar near the border of Dhanbad & Burdwan districts of the states of Jharkhand & West Bengal respectively. The unique feature of this is that it is located underground in the left bank of the river and is the first underground hydel power station of South East Asia. The power station has a total generating capacity of 60 MW with 3 units of 20 MW each. MHPS is located at almost 100 feet below the water level, and is the first of its kind, in South East Asia. After RM&U of unit no 2 of MHPS, its capacity was enhanced and the total Installed capacity of the plant is now 63.2 MW.

== Reservoir operation ==
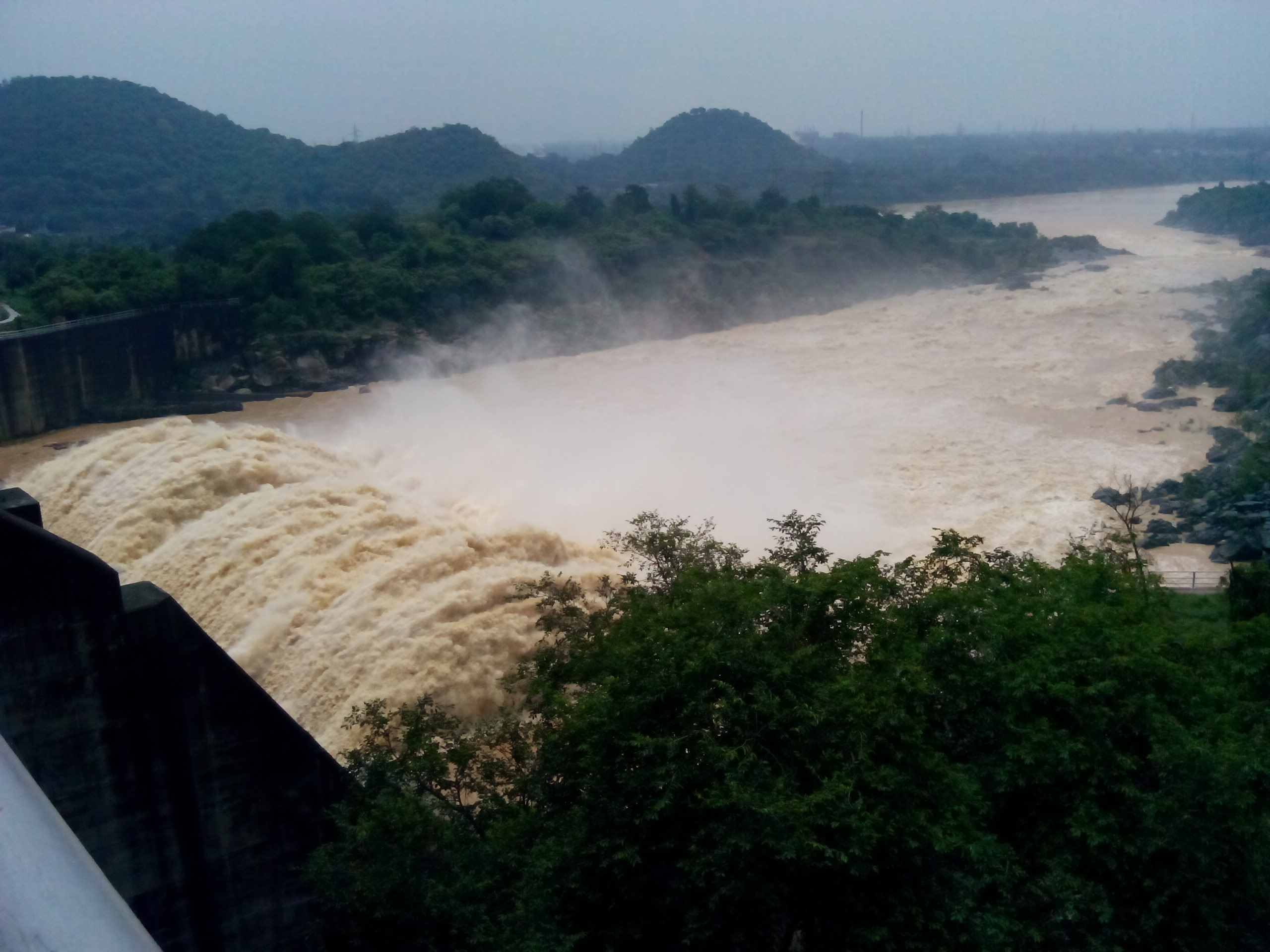
Reservoir of Maithon

A vast hydro meteorological station with VHF/wireless facilities exists over the Damodar catchment area. On a real time basis (hourly, 3 hourly, 6 hourly) data of river gauge, rainfall river discharge are measured and transmitted through existing communication network to the central flood station at Maithon. The Indian Meteorological Department, Kolkata, transmits the rainfall forecast for the next 24 hours for the entire Damodar Valley region to Maithon. A computer model at the Flood Forecasting Unit at Maithon estimates the inflow into the reservoirs based on the real time data and rainfall forecast.

According to detailed guidelines contained in the "Damodar Valley Reservoir Regulation Manual", Member Secretary of DVRRC (Damodar Valley Reservoir Regulation Committee) after discussion with SE, Damodar Irrigation Circle Govt. of West Bengal, Reservoir Operation of DVC & SE, Tenughat of Govt. of Jharkhand decides day to day release of water from Maithon Dam and Panchet Dam, and issues advice for release of water through the dams.

== Problems ==
People involved in power generation say that water should be filled up as much as possible as it would be better for power generation. People involved in flood control department says water storage should be lowered, so that in case of excessive rain a flood like situation arises then it will be a flood cushion. This is a conflicting nature, so water has to be kept at an optimum level to satisfy both parties.

Dead storage capacity of the dam during the initial years was much more than the storage capacity now. The portion of a water storage's capacity that is equal to the volume of water below the level of the lowest outlet (the minimum supply level), is known as th Dead Storage Capacity. This, increase has been mainly due to the sedimentation storage. Due to human & industrial activities, the storage capacity has decreased over the years. As per the design of dam, capacity depth should have been 500 ft (150 m). But due to non-acquisition of land the depth is at 495 ft (151 m). The carrying capacity of the dam was 1,000,000 cu ft/s (28,000 m^{3}/s). But at the time of construction it was only 250,000 cu ft/s (7,100 m^{3}/s) and at present it has a carrying capacity of less than 100,000 cu ft/s (2,800 m^{3}/s). The cost of removing deposited silt in the dam is equal to the construction of a new dam, therefore economically not viable. If the silt is removed and stored in the banks of the dam, then during monsoon, the silt would get washed off into the dam.

Maithon Dam has completed 60 years in service, and this naturally has an effect on the structures, in spite of regular maintenance by DVC.

== Flood warning ==
Before releasing the water from dam's spillway gates, a necessary warning is communicated to district authorities, affected downstream industries, municipalities and others including senior administrative officials of Burdwan, Bankura, Purulia; IOW Dept. Govt. of WB; EE, DHW, Durgapur; Member; CWC, New Delhi. Whenever there is a discharge from Maithon and Panchet dams exceeding 1,132 cu ft/s (32.1 m^{3}/s), special arrangements are broadcast through Doordarshan and AIR regional news bulletins. Doordarshan, Kolkata also telecasts daily weather forecasts with probable rainfall in the Damodar Valley.

Maithon Dam has completed its 60 successful years in the service to the nation but, the maintenance of the reservoir is a matter of concern. In these 60 years the depth of the reservoir has decreased, so it gets flooded very soon. So to maintain the safe level the water has to be released through dams. It has a dual impact, first it hits badly to the irrigation in Burdwan District also the power generation capacity MHPS as the capacity of the reservoir has decreased in last 60 years.

The rain water takes a lot of soil with it and the same settles down in the reservoir causing decrease in the depth.
