= P. C. Bose =

Indian politician and activist (1899–1959)

Prabhat Chandra Bose generally referred to as P. C. Bose, (17 August 1899 – 1959) was an Indian politician, independence activist and labour activist from Dhanbad.

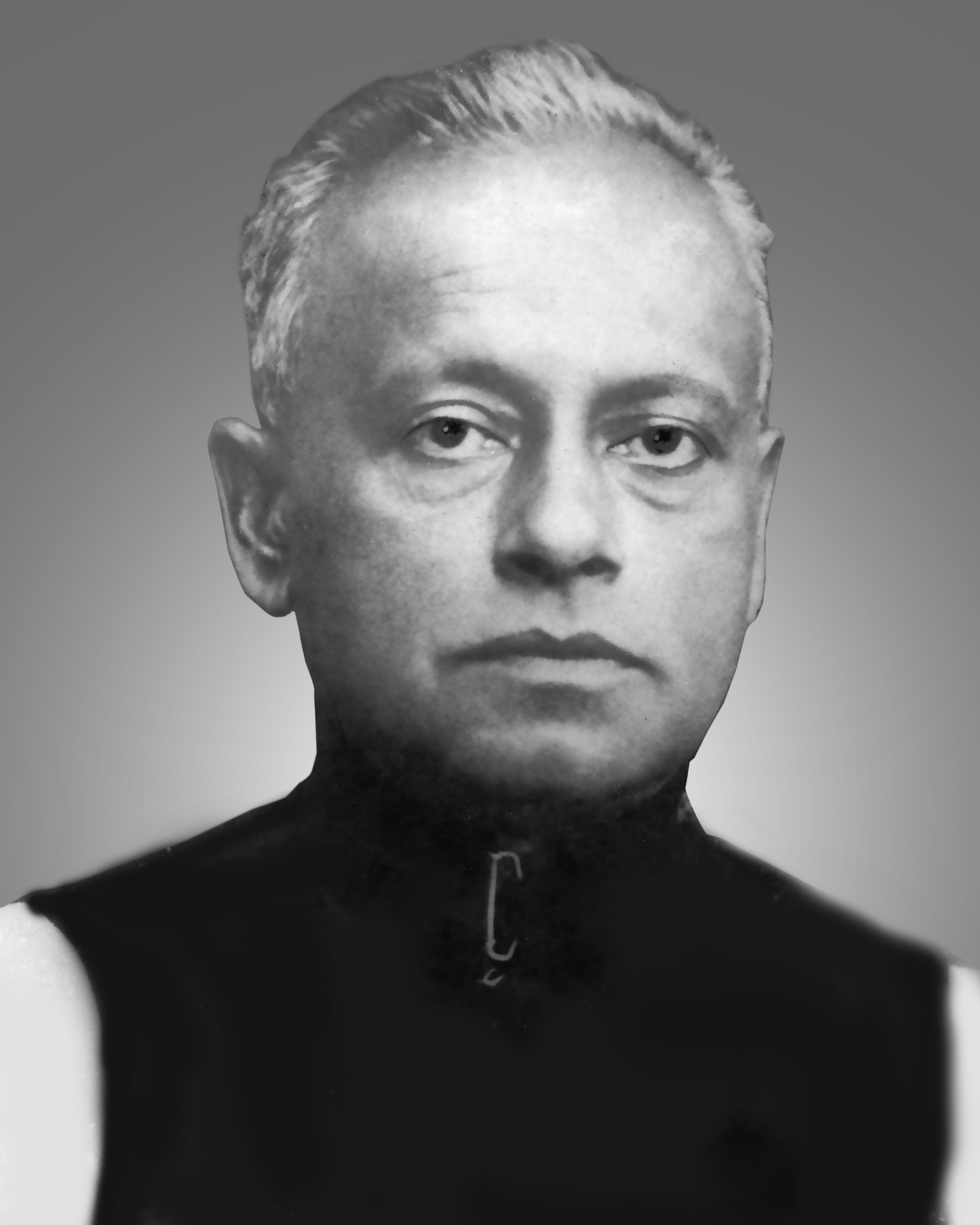

== Life ==
He was the son of Priyanath Bose, born at Khasial village in Jessore District of British India (now in Narail District, Bangladesh) on 17 August 1899.

He did his early education in Jharia Raj High School and later Narail Victoria College in Bangladesh and graduated from K. N. College, Berhampur affiliated to Calcutta University with Bachelor of Arts degree. He married Mrinalini in 1917 and had two sons and three daughters.

The Bose family migrated to Jharia from Bengal during his childhood. P. C. Bose went on to become a teacher at Jharia Raj High School.

He was a noted Indian National Congress politician and Gandhian Independence Activist from Dhanbad, the other from the region being Purushottam K. Chauhan. He and Chauhan both joined Civil Disobedience and Satyagraha movements together during the period 1930 to 1945 both were imprisoned by British for their independence activitsm. Bose was imprisoned five times and was in jail for about six years.

He was member of Bihar Legislative Assembly - 1946-52; Member, 1st Lok Sabha - (1952–57). He was re-elected to 2nd Lok Sabha from Dhanbad but died in 1959. He was Workers' delegate to ILO, Geneva conference 1928; Indian delegate to British Commonwealth Labour Conference, 1928; General Secretary, Indian Miners' Association, 1932–46, and President since 1946; Member, Mines Rescue Stations Committee since 1939; President, Manbhum D.C.C., 1941; Vice-President, All-India Trade Union Congress, 1945; President, Indian Mine Workers' Federation, 1946–47, and Treasurer, 1951-52; Member, Member, Congress Legislative Party, Bihar, 1946–52; Member, Labour Sub-Committee, Bihar, 1946–52; Workers' Representative, Indian Coal Mining Committee, Geneva, 1947 and Asian Regional Labour Conference, New Delhi, 1947; Member, Coal Mines Conciliation Board, . 1947; Member, Jharia Mines Board of Health since 1947; Member, Bihar Central (Standing) labour Advisory Board, 1947–52; President, Dhanbad Sub-District C.C., 1947–49, 1949–51 and 1951–54; President, Dhanbad Sub-District Panchayat Committee since 1948; Member, Coal Mines Welfare Fund Advisory Board and Coal Transport Advisory Board since 1948; Member, Industrial Housing Board since 1949; Member, General Council, INTUC, 1950–52; Member, Bihar P.C.C., 1951–54; Member, Governing Body, Jharia Raj H. E. School, Jharia, K. C. Girls' School and Jharia Banga Vidyalaya.

His elder son Shankar Bose, an advocate who practiced in Dhanbad as an Industrial & Labour Laws expert, was also a trade union leader and served in various capacities in INTUC (Indian National Trade Union Congress) and RCMS (Rashtriya Colliery Mazdoor Sangh) and was jailed by British for taking part in independence activities.

P.C. Bose died in 1959, while he was a sitting Member of Parliament.
