= Jharia Raj High School =

Location
- Rajapur, Purulia Dhanbad Rd. Dhanbad, Jharkhand; India; 23.7526801°N 86.4125971°E

Information
- Established: 1866
- Gender: Co-educational

Jharia Raj High School is the oldest higher secondary school in Dhanbad district located near Jharia at Bhagatdih.

== History ==
The school was established in 1866, by Raja Durga Prasad Singh, the Zamindar of Jharia Raj and hence named Jharia Raj High School. The district gazetteer notes that during Civil disobedience movement in 1930-34 the attendance at Jharia Raj School dropped from 420 to 89.

The school is a co-educational school, which has a large playground, library and computer learning facilities. The total number of students studying currently are 2024.

== See also ==
- Education in India
- CBSE
