= Bankhandhi Mishra =

Indian journalist (born 1933)

Bankhandhi Mishra (born 18 October 1933) is an Indian Hindi-lanuguage journalist, former proprietor-cum editor of Dainik Chunauti, a daily newspaper in Hindi, he published from Dhanbad. He is an author of many books on the history of Dhanbad and Jharia. For example: Baisakhi Nahi Chahiye (1972), Ateet Ke Jharokhe Se (2023), and Bhartiya Koyla Udyog ke agrani purush Ramjash Agarwala (2018). He has been awarded in 2021 by Dr. Ram Manohar Lohia Research Foundation for his research on Ram Manohar Lohia with whom he had worked in his young age. He is a resident of Jharia. He is founder Secretary Of Law College, Dhanbad and Coalfield College, Jharia. He is also Founder Principal of DAV High School, Patherdih. He served as an officer at The Directorate General of Mines Safety (DGMS) in Dhanbad, which is under Ministry Of Labour, Government Of India. He worked there from 1967-1981.
