= Jhaverilal K. Dholakia =

Jhaverilal K. Dholakia generally referred to as J. K. Dholakia (26 February 1886 – 14 December 1978) was a noted miner, engineer and expert in coal mining from Jharia.

== Early life and education ==
He was born in 1886 to Kalayan Rai Dholakia at Bhuj He was born in a Nagar community. Dholakia was educated in Vernacular and English at Alfred High School, Bhuj and passed Matriculation Examination in 1903 from the University of Bombay.

== Career ==
After passing Matriculation and also a Revenue Department Examinations from Bombay, Dholakia came to Calcutta in 1904 and worked in accounts department and later in the foreign correspondence section of Gokuldas Hansraj, a rice and general merchants from Bhatia community from Kutch owning rice mills at various centres and shipping rice overseas.

The major change in his career came when he was transferred to the collieries of another Bhatia industrialist, Trikamji Jiwandas in the beginning of 1905 and was posted at Balihari Colliery near Jharia. The colliery was joint venture between Trikamji, Gova Petha & Khora Ramji. Later, he obtained Colliery Manager's second class certificate of competency in 1908 and subsequently the first class certificate of competency in managing mines in 1917. He got a degree of mining engineer in 1921.

He had a long and successful career in Jharia and worked for following mines: Tricumji Jiwandas 1905–08; Manager: Sonachera Colliery 1909–17; Jaynarayan Ramjas Collieries 1917–21; S. D. Mehta & Co. Ltd., Balihari Colliery 1925–31; Agent, S. D. Mehta & Co. Ltd. 1932–36; Chief Mining Engineer, S. D. Mehta & Co. Ltd., 1932–44; H. V. Low & Co, 1944–45; Agent, Bhurangya Coal Co. 1945–47; Khatau & Co. Ltd., 1947–49; Officer-in-Charge, Kalyanji Mavji & Co. Collieries 1949–51; Bhurangya Colliery 1951–53. He retired in 1953 and went back to his native town, Bhuj, Kutch. However, he continued to serve as mining advisor for two major coal mining conglomerates of Jharia coalfields - Khatau & Company and Kalyanji Mavji & Co for many years from 1954 to 1963.

He served as the president of Geological, Mining and Metallurgical Society of India for years 1938–39, 1947–48. He was president of Indian Mine Managers' Association for years 1930–31.

He was a Chartered Engineer and fellow of Institution of Mining Engineers, London, North of England Institute of Mining & Mechanical Engineers

He continued to represent the institute on the Regional Coal Survey Committee for Jharia coalfield region.

He served as an honorary Secretary Indian Colliery Owners Association for years 1948–49 and was a committee member of association for many years.

He served on various boards and committees with respect to mining for example - Jharia Mines Board of Health (1919, 1929–33), Coal Mining Stowing Boards Expert Committee (1941–53), Low temperature Carbonization Committee (1944), chairman, Railways and Collieries Advisory Board, Mining Education Advisory Board, etc.

He was also active in public life and served as secretary of the Jharia Anglo Gujarati School for 1911–12; chairman Jharia- Dhanbad Gawshala; vice-chairman Bombay State Social Welfare Advisory Board and other institutions.

== Death ==
Dholakia died on 14 December 1978 at Bhuj, Gujarat, India.
