= Chhaganlal Karamshi Parekh =

Indian social worker

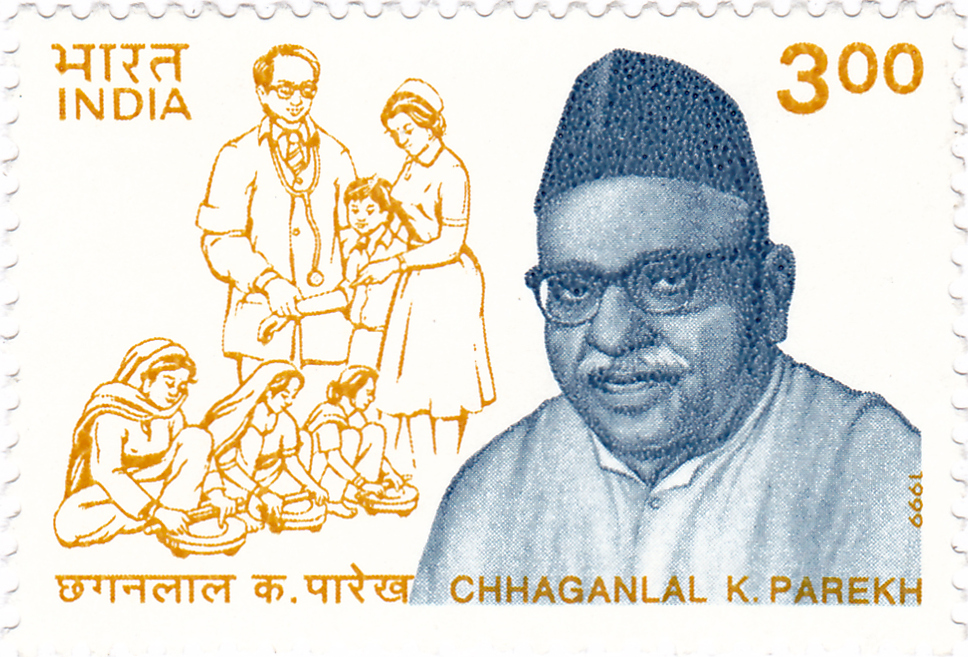
Parekh on a 1999 stamp of India

Chhaganlal Karamshi Parekh popularly known as Chhagan Bapa (27 June 1894 – 14 December 1968) was an Indian social worker who worked for education, upliftment of poor, and social reform of women.

== Birth ==
He was born in 1894 at Rajkot in Rajkot State in a Gujarati Vaishnava family of Lohana caste.

== Business Career & Social Works ==
=== At Jharia ===
In year 1912 at age of 18, he came to Jharia with help of Damodar Kunwarji Trivedi, who worked in colliery G. K. Dossa & Brothers at Jharia. Seth Gangji Dossa Jethwa was from Kutchi railway contractor and mines owner and owned several coal mines at Jharia under the firm M/s. G. K. Dosa & Brothers with his brother Seth Khimji Dosa Jethwa. He with his young son Purushottam had come Rajkot at that time at house of Trivedi. Seth Gangjibhai Jethwa was from KGK community from Nagalpar, Kutch and was one of the early entrant in coal mining in Jharia coalfields and close associate of Seth Khora Ramji & Jethabhai Lira Jethwa. Karamshi bhai Parekh, father of Chhaganbhai, who knew Trivedi came to meet Seth Gangji Bhai Jethwa, who assured he would take care of his son and train him. After meeting him, he decided to send young Chhagan to Jharia under his mentorship. He started his career as a clerk at R. A. Mucadam & Sons' Chanda colliery in Jharia owned by Parsi gentleman, Rustomji Ardesar Mukadam in same year. After a year he switched to Khas Kusunda colliery owned by Kutchi Pancha Devji at salary of Rs.30/- per month, which was later raised to Rs.40/- per month. This colliery was managed by Kanji Khengar, who trained him well into job. Later in 1914 his mentors, Seth Gangji Dossa Jethwa & his brother Seth Khimji Dossa Jethwa, seeing that he is well trained, offered him job of supervisor in their own, Lower & Upper Jharia Collieries located at Tisra, fulfilling the promise they gave his father, Karamshibhai. Chhagan Bhai after joining, soon impressed his mentors with his dedication and efficiency in managing of colliery and he was soon promoted. From here he progressed to start his own coal supply firm with support from his employers Seth Gangji bhai Jethwa, Seth Khimji Bhai Jethwa, Seth Khataubhai Sethia, Seth Kripashankar bhai Worah, Seth Harishanker bhai Worah, who offered them to become their coal supply agent.Till 1930 he managed mines of Gangji Dosa & Sons, in 1930 he became selling agent of M/s K. Worah & Co, to eventually start his own business as coal supplier. He flourished in this business and made good money.

He was among the committee members of historic All India Trade Union Congress meeting hosted at Jharia in year 1921 and shared dais (representing Gangji Dossa & Sons) with other notable colliery owners like, Ramjush Agarwalla, the host and others like, Karamshi Khora, D. D. Thacker and other dignitaries.

=== At Calcutta ===
But in the year 1949, there was change in his life. He took retirement from his work and dedicated his life towards social service. He got inspiration for social work from Thakkar Bapa and became a member of Servants of India Society and served in earthquake relief works in Assam and earthquake relief works in Kutch and tribal upliftment in Himachal Pradesh

After, leaving Jharia in 1949, he spent almost a decade in Calcutta where he already had a house and offices for coal supply business. Here, he helped founding Laxminarayan Temple and Laxminarayan Trust Maternity Home & Hospital at Bhowanipore, both the establishments were funded by Gujarati diaspora of Calcutta, which included a handsome donation by him and Kutchi miners from Jharia, due to whom he had started his career of coal agent. This hospital he helped founding also houses a library in its campus named after chief donor as "Harishankar Worah Library Hall" He also helped start a Gujarati school in Calcutta under same Trust, which was housed within BGES College.

=== At Bombay ===
However, he later dedicated his whole life in social works and later shifted to Bombay around 1959.

At Bombay, he was inspiration and guide behind starting of Lijjat Papad in 1959, which is a noted women's cooperative. based at Mumbai.

=== At Haridwar ===
Chhganbhai was General Secretary of Lohana Conference when he and Nanji Kalidas Mehta met each other at Haridwar. The friendship continued and later he, Jamnadas Khimji Kothari and Nanji Kalidas Mehta along with Hansraj Laxmichand Chadaramji came together to build a Gujrati Dhramshala at Haridwar, which was completed in 1952.

=== At Kutch ===
During the earthquake of 1956 in Kutch, he worked relentlessly for the relief work, collecting funds and doing other humanitarian services. In course of his works at Anjar he was also responsible for laying foundation of Anjar General Hospital and the first girls' high school of Anjar known as K.K.M.S. Girls High School for which he was able to generate a munificent donation from Seth Khatau Mavji Sethia's family and Smt. Kankuben Khatau Sethia, Maniben Sethia of Calcutta.

== Death ==
He died on 14 December 1968, at Bombay, survived by his 2 sons -Ratilal and Mulchand, and their families.

== Honors and memorials ==
The Government of India issued a postage stamp in his honor in 1999. Shri Laxminarayan Temple at Kolkata, have named the guest house as Chhagan Bapa Athithi Gruh in memorial to him in 1976. From 1980, Lijjat started giving Chhaganbapa Smruti Scholarships to the daughters of the member-sisters in his memory. The Gujarati Dharamshala at Haridwar, which he helped founding has named a building after him as Chhagan Bapa Smarak Bhawan Punyashlok Chhaganbapa: Godfather of Shri Mahila Griha Udyog Lijjat Papad is biograbhy of him published by Lijjat Papad family in 1980.
