= Jharia Gujarati Hindi High School =

Location
- Jharia, Nai Duniya Mohlla; Dhanbad, Jharkhand; India
- Coordinates: 23.7407133°N 86.4208413°E

Information
- Established: 1905; 121 years ago
- Gender: Co-educational
- Classes: K.G to 10

Jharia Gujarati Hindi High School founded as Jharia Anglo-Gujarati School is a Middle school and a High School. It is a co-educational school. It is located near Jharia Post Office, Jharia, Jharkhand. It is one of the oldest school of the region being established in year 1905.

== History ==
The school was established in the year 1905 by Gujarati population living in Dhanbad and Jharia to impart education of Gujarati language along with English education to their children. It was named as Jharia Anglo-Gujarati School. The school was founded mainly from the funds donated by Kutchi railway contractors and coal miners belonging to the Kutch Gurjar Kshatirya community with leadership of Seth Khora Ramji and others. Seth Khora Ramji remained as school's chief trustee and founder patron till 1920. After establishment of the school, the other Gujarati community from Dhanbad coalfields also came for expansion and management of the school. Eminent Gujarati and other personalities from Jharia like Jhaverilal Dholakia, Jatashankar Dossa, D. D. Thacker, Kripa Shankar Worah and others like Bhagwati Prasad Agarwalla have served as the secretary and trustees of the school.

Later on in the decade of 1930 the Marwari colliery owners and other local Bihari entrepreneurs joined the school management and Hindi language was also included to cater to large class of students and hence the name was changed to Jharia Gujarati Hindi High School.

== Present status ==
Presently, the school is run by private trust. It is run as a co-educational school as a middle and a secondary school.
