= SSLNT Women's College =

Shree Shree Lakshmi Narayan Trust Mahila Mahavidyalaya, Dhanbad
- Other names: S.S.L.N.T.
- Type: Public
- Established: 1955
- Affiliations: Binod Bihari Mahto Koyalanchal University
- Location: Dhanbad, Jharkhand, India; 12.34°N 98.76°W
- Campus: Urban
- Website: www.sslnt.in

SSLNT Women's College is a women's college in Dhanbad, Jharkhand, India. It offers intermediate and bachelor's degree courses in arts, science and commerce, as well as postgraduate courses in home science and B.Ed. Intermediate courses are conducted under the Jharkhand Academic Council, while degree and postgraduate courses are affiliated with Binod Bihari Mahto Koyalanchal University, Dhanbad.

== History ==
The foundation of the main college building was laid by His Excellency the Governor & Chancellor of Bihar on 27 August 1962 Sri. Anant S.Iyengar. The main building of the college was inaugurated by the Hon. Late Smt. Indira Gandhi on 11 July 1965, the then Information & Broadcasting Minister of India. The college was affiliated with Bihar University in 1960. In 1961 the college became a part of the Ranchi University. In 1975 the college became a constituent unit of the Ranchi University. In 1992 the college was included in the newly founded Vinoba Bhave University. This college is now affiliated with Binod Bihari Mahto Koyalanchal University.

== Courses ==
=== Intermediate ===
- Arts
- Science
- Commerce

=== Degree courses in arts (Hons. & Gen.) ===
- Hindi, Bengali, English, Sanskrit, Urdu
- Music, Economics, History, Pol. Sc., Philosophy, Psychology
- Mathematics
- Home Science

=== Degree courses in science (Hons. & Gen.) ===
- Chemistry
- Physics
- Mathematics
- Zoology
- Botany

=== Degree courses in commerce (Hons. & Gen.) ===
- Accountancy (Hons.)

=== Post-graduate courses in arts ===
- Home Science, History, Political Science,

=== Self-financing courses ===
- B.Ed.

=== Certificate courses ===
BBA in Tourism Management.

== Clubs ==
- Research and Development Cell
- Self Development Center
- Art Forum
- Literary Circle
- Group Discussion Cell
- Nature Club
- Photography Club
- Science Club
- Alumni Association
- NSS
- NCC

== Infrastructure ==
- 2 administrative buildings
- 3 hostels
- Staff quarters
- Laboratories
- Canteen
- Library

== Accreditation ==
SSLNT Women's College was awarded a 'B' grade by the National Assessment and Accreditation Council (NAAC).
