= Khora Ramji Chawda =

Seth Khora Ramji Chawda
- Born: Khora Ramji Chawda; 1860; Sinugra, Cutch State
- Died: 1924 (aged 63–64); Jharia, British India
- Other names: Khoda Ramji
- Occupations: Coal miner; banker; railway contractor
- Known for: Coal mining pioneer; railway bridge constructions; philanthropist

Khora Ramji Chawda (1860–1924), better known as Seth Khora Ramji, was a noted railway contractor, coal mines owner, banker and philanthropist of the early 20th century in India, who worked from Jharia near Dhanbad.

== Life-sketch ==
He was born in the year 1860 in a small village called Sinugra in Cutch and belonged to small but enterprising KGK community. He was one of the reputed Railway Contractors of his times and his exploits were mentioned by British authorities. He is also credited by them to be the first Indian to break monopoly of Europeans in Jharia coalfields. He established his first Colliery name Khas Jharia Colliery in 1895 and moved on to establish five more by 1910. He was also a financing partner in more than 10 collieries of Jharia coal belt and additionally worked as a Private Banker. Seth Khora Ramji and Jethabhai were all together five brothers and all were partners as HUF in the colliery and railway contract business With his brother, Jethabhai Lira Jethwa (1862–1932) he owned Khas Jinagora Colliery, which operated under name & style of J. & K. Ramji.

=== Railway Contract Works across British India ===
As per British records – a few lines are quoted –

Seth Khora Ramji have done works of great magnitude :- Hundred Miles of Railway in Sindh & North west India. Twenty Miles of Railway lines on Southern Mahratta Railway. Twenty two miles of railway line on East Bengal Railway, loco quarters at Hubli including several bridges of great magnitude. His elder brothers were also carrying on at the same time railway works in Southern India and they also won name as successful contractors. All them joined hands in business and formed themselves in syndicate and completed works in Madras and Southern Mahratta Railway but later unfortunately he lost all brothers but one. So he was left almost single handed. Seth Khora Ramji deserved much credit for the satisfactory completion of the above works because they involve much skill and labour and many mathematical calculations. Though uneducated he grasped clearly all the principals underlying these constructions and worked all the contracts entrusted to him to the satisfaction of railway authorities. In 1900 there was a turn in his business life. Just at that time Jharia coal fields were being exploited by Europeans and Seth Khora Ramji was first Indian to seize the opportunity. He purchased two collieries to begin with. Gradually others from Kutch and Gujarat followed suite and now Jharia has been changed into a Gujarati settlement with about 50 Kutchi out of 92 Gujarati collieries proprietors with Seth Khora Ramji as head of them all. He is now sole proprietor of two collieries and a financing member of about eight collieries. Several District official have remarked him as "Multi-millionaire, one of the first class parties in Jharia."

Some of the works done by Khora Ramji Chawda of Sinugra are : 1880 : 100 Miles work in SPDR & NWSR, Hubli Loco Shed & other station and yard works, 20 Miles Work in SMR, 177 miles in 1882–84 Hotgi to Gadag with his brothers in SMR, 22 Miles Railway and a bridge in EBSR, 1888 – 128 miles in Bilaspur to Jharsuguda with fellow Mistris section including Bridge over Hasdeo River at Champa in BNR, in 1894 Jharia Branch line of EIR, 1895: Railway line in ECoSR & Bridge over Rushikulya near Ganjam. His last Railway work was in 1903: Bridge over Ganges river in Allahabad – Lucknow section 32 Miles Railway in GIPR.

=== Shift in career from Contractor to Miner ===
His last Railway work was in 1903: Bridge over Ganges river in Allahabad – Lucknow section 32 Miles Railway in GIPR, while working for this bridge, he was harassed by Engineer-in-Charge R. R. Gale, so he decided to stop railway contracts. By this time since 1895 to 1901 he had already started two collieries in Jharia. A. B. Gale later realized his mistake and offered him contracts in other section. But Khora Ramji declined the offer and diverted all his energy to coal mining business, in which he was assisted by his brother's and their sons. He also started a new venture as a private banker at Jharia. He rose to such a height by 1920 and became Seth (Note: Sheth was used in 18th-19th century in India for big financers - bankers of the town) Khora Ramji from Khora Ramji that British had to mention his name in Encyclopedia of Bengal, Bihar & Orissa. He had studied up to fourth standard in his native village school but still managed to build railway bridges which requires technical knowledge and mathematical calculations.

=== Coal Mines at Jharia coalfields belt ===
Khora Ramji and Brothers established collieries at Khas Jharia, Jeenagora, Jamadoba, Balihari, Fatehpur, Gareria, Bansjora & Bagadih. In Pure Jharia Colliery Khora Ramji and brothers were partners with Diwan Bahadur D.D. Thacker. Khora Ramji was also partner in Khimji Walji & Company's Indian Jharia Colliery located at Tisra. Seth Khora Ramji was also held partnership stake in Goa Petha Chawda & Co's Khas Jeenagora Colliery. The GPC & Co was partnership between Goa Petha, Seth Khora Ramji, Bishram Karman & Seth Tricumji Jiwandas. In 1930 after death of Khora Ramji, the successors sold their stake in the colliery.

The credit of being first Indian to break the monopoly of British in Jharia Coalfields goes to Seth Khora Ramji of Sinugra. In the life sketch of Khora Ramji given in Encyclopedia of Bengal, Bihar & Orissa – the British have noted this fact in year 1920 – "In Jharia Coalfield he was first Indian to seize the opportunity and by his prompt entry into colliery business, he was able to remove the stigma that would otherwise be levelled against his community as economically backward class." Further, details are given in the book Diary of Golden Days at Jharia – A Memoir & History of Gurjar Kshatriya Samaj of Kutch in Coalfields of Jharia – written by Natwarlal Devram Jethwa & Pawan Jethwa -Quote:

The East Indian Railway in 1894–95 extended its line from Barakar to Dhanbad via Katras and Jharia. Messrs. Khora Ramji in 1894 was working on railway lines contract of Jharia branch line and with his brother Jetha Lira, they were also building Jharia railway station. The Jharia coalfields was discovered while digging up the earth for laying this railway line. Khora Ramji while working near Jharia Railway station immediately realized the gold he had struck and purchased the lands from Raja of Jharia and soon also got lease of mining rights and thus laid foundation of his colliery business.

He similarly purchased about eight coal-fields from years 1895–1909. Further, he also encouraged fellow Mistri contractors to purchase the land and even financed them to do so. The location of his three collieries named Jeenagora, Khas Jherria, Gareria is mentioned also in 1917 Gazetteers of Bengal, Assam, Bihar & Orissa. As per details given in Diary of Golden Days at Jharia – A Memoir & History of Gurjar Kashtriya Samaj of Kutch in Coalfields of Jharia – written by Natwarlal Devram Jethwa & Pawan Jethwa – "Seth Khora Ramji headed the first association as mentioned by British authorities in Encyclopaedia Bengal, Bihar & Orissa (1920)."

=== Shipping Business at Cutch State ===
Seth Khora Ramji and his brothers also owned a fleet of ships based in Cutch State, which was used to deal in importing and exporting dry fruits and spices, trading from Tuna Port and Mandvi with Muscat, Mombasa, Mzizima, Zanzibar. After the death of Khora Ramji, one of his grandsons, Jivram Jeram carried on a shipping business for a couple of decades until 1945.

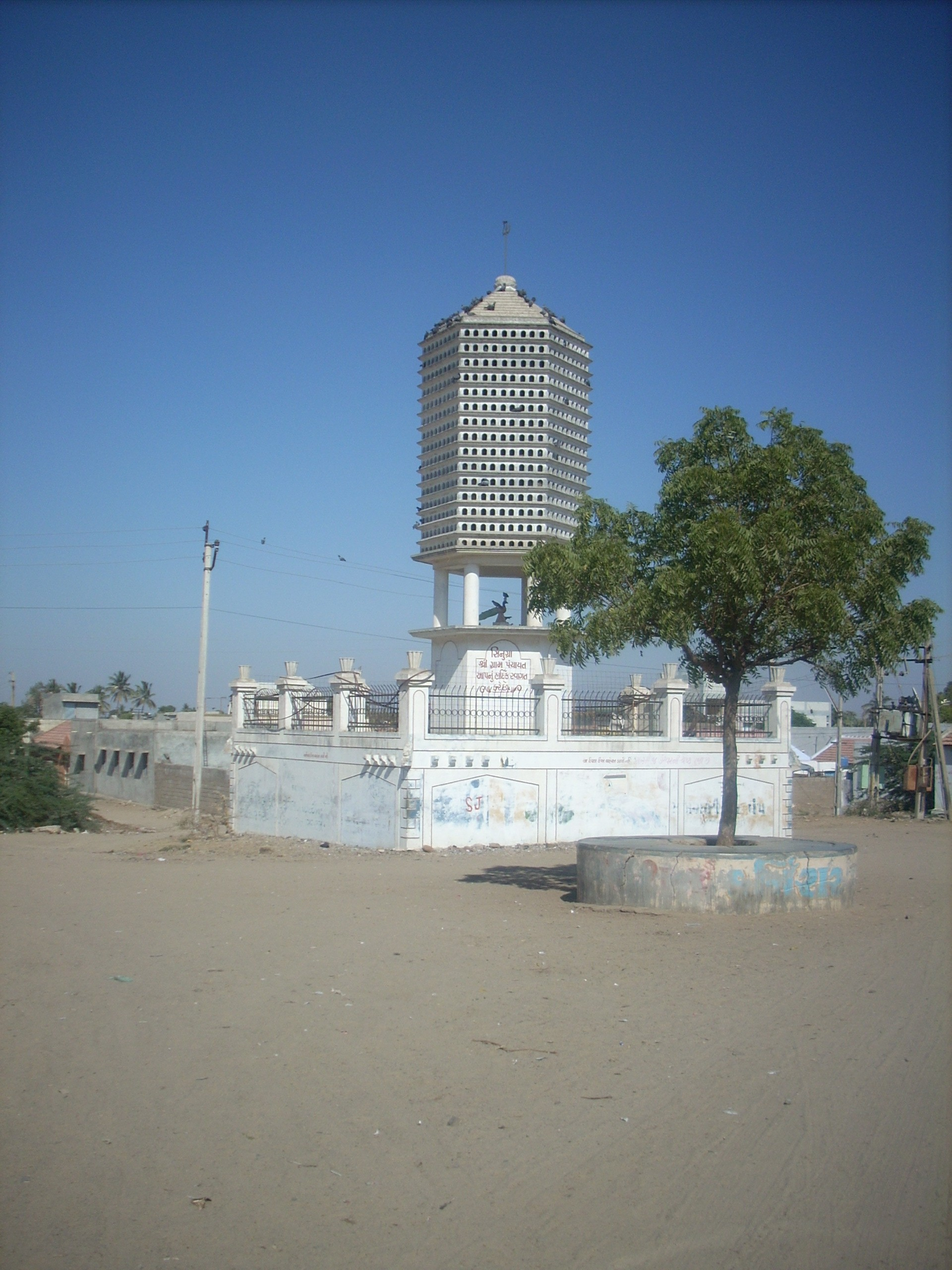
A Chabutro built by Seth Khora Ramji standing at Sinugra Village built in 1900.

== Death ==
Khora Ramji died in year 1924 at Jharia.

== Philanthropic activities ==
As a philanthropist, in his native village Sinugra, he had built and donated a Hindu temple, wells, welcome-gate, Chabutro and a primary school, which is now named Seth Khora Ramji Prathmik Shala in the year 1910. He also donated major fund along with some other Mistri colliery owners to start a Gujarati school named the Jharia Anglo-Gujarati School at Jharia in 1905. He also owned more than 500 acres farm-lands, the produce of which was given away to poor and needy. In the year 1920, when he held a large public charity event and a yagna at Sinugra. At the time of this event, Seth Khora Ramji was honoured by Maharao of Cutch, HH Sir Khengarji III Sawai Bahadur, who sent him a Paghdi by hands of royal messenger. Further, at Mathura he along with Jetha Lira Jethwa of Sinugra had built and donated a Dharamashala now named Kutch Kadia Kshatriya Dharamshala in the year 1889–1900, when they were stationed there for railway contract job.

Seth Khora Ramji was one of the sponsors of AITUC meeting held in 1921 at Jharia, hosted by Ramjush Agarwalla. As he had become old and was unwell, his eldest son Karamshi Khora, represented Seth Khora Ramji & Brothers and was among the dignitaries, who shared dais in historic All India Trade Union Congress meeting held at Jharia in 1921 by prominent AITUC labor leaders like Joseph Baptista, Diwan Chaman Lall, Swami Viswananda, Swami Darsanananda and Savitri Devi, Hardevdas Aagarwal and Shyam Sundar Chakravarty. The meeting was hosted by colliery owner, Ramjush Agarwalla and dignitaries representing various colliery firms present on dais were Karamshi Khora, D. D. Thacker, Chhaganlal Karamshi Parekh, Gangji Dosa, Keshavji Pitambar, R. A. Mucadam, Madhavji Jiwan, Nibaran Chandra Sircar and others.

== Successors ==
The several mines were owned jointly as HUF by the family of 5 brothers of Seth Khora Ramji, which were divided among the family mutually after his death. Ambalal Khora also carried on father's legacy as a railway contractor, who died in a railway accident.

=== Capcize & Fire in main mines ===
His eldest son Karamshi Khora took over the management of Khas Jharia and Golden Jharia mines after his death. Several after his death two of his main collieries, Khas Jharia & Golden Jharia, which worked on maximum 260-foot-deep shafts, collapsed due to now infamous underground fires, in which their house and bungalow also collapsed on 8 November 1930, causing 18 feet subsidence and widespread destruction. These two main coal mines at that time were run by his sons Karamshi Khora, Ambalal Khora & Chandulal Khora. The other collieries, which survived fires were managed by Mulji Akhoy Chawda, Bhimji Narayan Chawda, Jiwram Jairam Chawda and Devram Jethabhai Jethwa.

=== New Ventures ===
Successors invested in fresh coal mines business as joint venture with Ojha family and others to start Shampore Colliery at Mohuda.

=== Nationalization of Coal Mines in 1971 ===
The business of some other coal mines in Jharia of Seth Khora Ramji were carried on by his successors along with some new joint ventures like Shampore Colliery with Jayantial Ojha, were all taken over by the government when the all the private coal mines in India were nationalized in 1971–72.

== See also ==
- Jagmal Raja Chauhan
- Mulji Jagmal Savaria
