= Jharia Khas =

- Neighbourhood in Dhanbad
- Location in Jharkhand, India Jharia Khas (India)
- Coordinates: 23.744958°N 86.402675°E
- Country: India
- State: Jharkhand
- District: Dhanbad

Government
  - Type: Dhanbad Municipal Corporation

Population (2001)
  - Total: 19,808

Languages
  - Official: Hindi, Urdu
- Time zone: UTC+5:30 (IST)
- Vehicle registration: JH

Jharia Khas is a neighbourhood in Dhanbad in Dhanbad Sadar subdivision of Dhanbad district in Jharkhand state, India.

== Geography ==
Cities, towns and locations in the central portion of Dhanbad Sadar subdivision in Dhanbad district
MC: Municipal Corporation, CT: Census Town, N: Neighbourhood, R: Rural/ Urban centre
Owing to space constraints in the small map, the actual locations in a larger map may vary slightly

=== Location ===
Jharia Khas is located at 23.744958°N 86.402675°E.

Note: The map alongside presents some of the notable locations in the area. All places marked in the map are linked in the larger full screen map.

The earlier census town was combined with other urban units to form Dhanbad Municipal Corporation in 2006.

Jharia Khas is part of Ward No. 39 of Dhanbad Municipal Corporation.

=== Overview ===
The region shown in the map is a part of the undulating uplands bustling with coalmines in the lowest rung of the Chota Nagpur Plateau. The entire area shown in the map is under Dhanbad Municipal Corporation, except Belgaria which is under Baliapur (community development block). The places in the DMC area are marked as neighbourhoods. The DMC area shown in the map is around the core area of Dhanbad city. Another major area of DMC is shown in the map of the southern portion of the district. A small stretch of DMC, extending up to Katras is shown in the map of the western portion. The region is fully urbanised. Jharia (community development block) has been merged into DMC. Three operational areas of BCCL operate fully within the region – Sijua Area, Kusunda Area and Bastacola Area.

== Demographics ==
As of 2001 India census, Jharia Khas had a population of 19,808. Males constitute 55% of the population and females 45%. Jharia Khas has an average literacy rate of 54%, lower than the national average of 59.5%: male literacy is 64%, and female literacy is 43%. In Jharia Khas, 17% of the population is under 6 years of age.

== See also ==
- Jharia
