= Purushottam K. Chauhan =

Indian politician

- Born: 1905; Reha, Cutch, British India
- Died: 1958 (aged 52–53); Bombay, India
- Other name: Purusottam Chauhan / P. K. Chauhan / Purushottam Khimji Chauhan
- Occupations: Coal miner, politician & leader
- Known for: Independence activist, Labor leader, politician

Purushottam K. Chauhan (1905–1958) was a freedom fighter, coal mines owner, social leader, labor activist and politician from Dhanbad, India.

== Life-sketch ==
He was born in 1905 in his native village called Reha in Kutch. His father Khimji Walji Chauhan was a Railway Contractor belonging to Mestri community of Kutch. In the year 1916, Khimji Walji & Company was founded by his father Khimji Walji in partnership with Seth Khora Ramji & brothers. The firm founded Indian Jharia Colliery, the coal mines of which were located in Tisra. After death of his father in 1936, he became Senior & Managing Partner of the coal mining firm.

He was highly influenced by ideals of Mahatma Gandhi when he was studying Law in Calcutta and joined Indian independence movement. He led the rally in Quit India Movement on 17 August 1942 at Dhanbad, which was broken up by lathicharge and a continent of anti-aircraft gunners was sent from Asansol under Captain Ellis to control the activists in Dhanbad. Chauhan along with other student leaders like P. C. Bose were arrested by British and sent to jail. Chauhan and Bose both were student Congress leaders from Dhanbad, while P. C. Bose after independence was Member of Parliament from Dhanbad for years 1951–57 and 1957–62, where as P. K. Chauhan became the Member of Legislative Assembly of Bihar from Dhanbad for same period.

In the year 1947 Chauhan attended 30th session of International Labour Conference held at Geneva from 19 June to 11 July 1947 as an employers delegate; where-in he was appointed as substitute to Resolutions Committee headed by Naval Tata Again in 1948, he attended 31st International Labour Conference held in San Francisco, United States of America, from 17 June 1948 to 10 July 1948. He attended conference as a Member of Legislative Assembly of Bihar, who was appointed as an Advisory member and also as a representative of Government of India to the delegation. This year also he was one of the advisers to the delegation and also appointed as substitute to Naval Tata in resolutions committee.

After independence of India, he became a Member of Bihar Legislative Assembly as a candidate of Indian National Congress, twice in 1948 and 1952, defeating strong opponents like, the Raja of Jharia (Raja Kali Prasad Singh) and the Raja of Ramgarh (Raja Bahadur Kamakhya Narain Singh) in respective years.

He was a champion of labour cause and in spite of himself being owner of coal mines, was so popular that he went on to become the President of Jharia Coalfields Mazdoor Sangh, i.e., Labour Union of Jharia Coalfiedls, a unit of Bharatiya Mazdoor Sangh for the years 1955–56.

He was a good orator and was applauded by Dr. Rajendra Prasad for his exemplary and compassionate speech on bringing the Bihar Abolition of Zamindaris Act in 1950. He was closely associated with other prominent activists and politicians from Bihar like, Dr. Rajendra Prasad, Jayaprakash Narayan, Sri Krishna Sinha, Anugrah Narayan Sinha, Satyendra Narayan Sinha, Binodanand Jha, Krishna Ballabh Sahay.

He died suddenly due to heart attack at the age of 53 in the year 1958 in Bombay.
