= Shri Laxminarayan Temple, Kolkata =

Hindu temple in Kolkata, India

Coordinates: 22°32′00″N 88°21′14″E

Shri Laxminarayan Temple, Bhawanipur, Kolkata is a Hindu Mandir located in South Kolkata at 42,Sarat Bose Road in Bhawanipore locality Kolkata. It was established in 1952 by Gujarati Vaishnav community of town. The temple houses deities of Lakshmi Narayana, Rama - Sita - Lakshmana and Shiva Lingum in main Garbhagriha. Also there are idols of Hanumanji, Ganesha in side panel.

The temple complex also houses Dharamshala offering budget lodging facilities and also has large hall, which they offer at rent for functions like social meeting, marriage and religious discourse and ceremonies for the members of Gujarati community. It is managed by a non-profit charitable trust founded by Gujarati diaspora of town.

In 1950 the Gujarati Vaishnav community had organized a Bhagavata Purana discoursed by Dongre Maharaj at Bhawanipur Calcutta in Netaji Subhas Udhyan. During which a lot of funds got collected as way of voluntary donation from Gujarati Vaishnav community living in city. The people wanted that funds should be used for religious purpose only. Chhaganlal Karamshi Parekh, a noted social worker from Gujarati community popularly known as Chhagan Bapa, who at that time lived in Calcutta, suggested that a temple be built from these money. He took leading role and further initiative to collect more funds and to lay the foundation of trust and also to buy land for temple.

In later years Gujarati people donated more money to build the Dharamshala and community hall. This complex built within the temple campus was founded in 1978 and was named in memory of Chhagan Bapa, as Chhagan Bapa Athithi Gruh

In same year in 1978, Shrimad Sudhindra Thirtha Swamiji camped in Lakshmi Narayan Temple Guest House and organised discourse, thus bringing together South Indians living in Calcutta to come together to bring an association for themselves Ever since many religious discourse have been held here and many saints have visited the temple.

The Gujarati community also takes out a procession from Laxmi Narayan Temple to Jalaram Temple at Haridevpur on occasion of janam-jayanti celebration of Shri Jalaram Bapa, a revered saint of Gujarat.

During elections temple is popular place to hold election rally to address Gujarati people who have significant population in Bhawanipur area of Kolkata.

Gujarati community association of town organize their traditional Dandiya Raas an Garba every year in Navratri, which they started in late 1950s. It is held in the temple community hall keeping alive their tradition. Also every year on eve of Hindu New Year the community assembles to greet each other on new year.

The complex also houses a canteen, which serves purely vegetarian Gujarati cuisine only.
