= Gautam Choudhury =

Indian musician and amateur archivist

- Also known as: Gautamda
- Born: 24 April 1940 (age 86); Dhanbad, Jharkhand, India
- Occupations: Musician, writer, IT consultant
- Instruments: Harmonica, acoustic guitar, bass harmonica, chord harmonica
- Years active: 1990–present
- Labels: EMI, BMG, Saregama, His Master's Voice
- Formerly of: The Bloworms
- Website: salilda.com

Gautam Choudhury (born 24 April 1940) is an Indian musician and amateur archivist most known for his efforts to collect and record the work of Salil Chowdhury (Salilda). He has recorded several instrumental albums on which he plays harmonica, recorded tribute albums to Salilda's legacy, and runs the website The World of Salil Chowdhury, an online database of Salil Chowdhury's work, including rare or unpublished compositions. He currently resides in the Netherlands with his wife.

== Early life in India ==
Choudhury was born and raised in Dhanbad, Jharkhand. He discovered his love of music at the age of 8 when his grandmother gave him his first harmonica. He attended Patna university in Bihar, where he became acquainted with the work of the notable Indian composer Salil Chowdhury, whose music became an important inspiration to him. Besides the harmonica, he also started playing the acoustic guitar. After graduating, he moved to Kolkata and played chord harmonica in The Bloworms. He was also a member of the Calcutta Youth Choir as a singer and a rhythm guitarist. Later, he performed as a session musician for a few Bengali films.

== Musical career abroad ==
After working for a few years Choudhury left India and lived in the UK, Germany, Spain, Belgium, and the Netherlands working as an IT consultant. In 1981 he met Salil Chowdhury while visiting India. They became friends and met frequently during the following years. In 1993, Choudhury released his first harmonica album, Tribute to the Maestro, featuring Salilda's music. After Salilda died in 1995, Choudhury began work on creating and preserving Salilda's work. In 1998, he launched The World of Salil Chowdhury website, a complete online archive of Salilda's music and writing, which he continues to maintain.

Choudhury is a passionate harmonica player and collector of harmonica recordings from around the world. He owns several unique and rare harmonicas including a bass and a chord harmonica and is an admirer of the jazz harmonica player Toots Thielemans. Choudhury feels that the harmonica as an instrument is often not valued sufficiently, stating in an interview with the Bangalore Harmonica Club that "It's not perceived or respected as a musical instrument in India and not taken seriously." Choudhury is a member of the National Harmonica League and The Society for the Preservation and Advancement of the Harmonica and was involved in the production of the 1972 documentary Playing the Thing which highlighted some European and international harmonica players at the time. Choudhury's latest harmonica album, Remembering Dada Burman, was released in 2014.

== The World of Salil Chowdhury ==
The World of Salil Chowdhury is an online archive and database of Salil Chowdhury's work and compositions. It contains over one thousand songs in ten languages composed by Salil Chowdhury. Choudhury created it as a memorial of Salilda and to highlight his lesser known work, including rare and unpublished compositions and alternate recordings of songs. Included on the website is a list of films for which Salilda has composed songs as well as mass songs and songs of political protest written by Salilda early on in his career. Choudhury includes notes based on his research that explain how he found or came to own some of Salilda's more obscure compositions, as well as blog posts and news articles announcing changes or new additions to the catalogue.

== Tributes to Salil Chowdhury ==
Beginning in 1993, Choudhury started recording harmonica albums featuring Salil Chowdhury's songs. Choudhury's final tribute to Salilda was recorded just after his death in 1995. Afterwards, Choudhury began researching his unreleased work from the '40s and '50s. In 2010, he released Songs of Consciousness, an album featuring many of Salilda's rare songs. A second album of unreleased songs, featuring compositions written just before Bangladesh became independent was produced and released by Choudhury in 2011.

== Discography ==
- Tribute to the Maestro (1990)
- Down Melody Lane with Gautam Choudhury and His Harmonica (1992)
- Tribute To S. Chowdhury (1995)
- Tribute to Kishore (1995)
- Songs of Consciousness (2010)
- Songs of Bangladesh Independence Movement (2011)
- Remembering Pancham (2012)
- Remembering Dada Burman (2014)
