= Satya Narayan Gourisaria =

- Born: 7 May 1929; Dhanbad, Bihar, India
- Awards: Padma Shri

Satya Narayan Gourisaria (born 7 May 1929) is an Indian born British company secretary, Gandhian and a former secretary of the India League, an Indian independence movement organization founded by V. K. Krishna Menon. He was born on 7 May 1929 at Dhanbad, in the Indian state of Bihar but shifted to East Bengal, then in erstwhile East Pakistan to return to India in 1948, a year after the Indian independence. He did his college studies at Scottish Church College, Kolkata and migrated to United Kingdom in the 1950s to stay there for 61 years. A former company secretary at Douglas Fraser and Sons (London) Limited, Gourisaria has also held the directorship of the now defunct Ashoka Publications. During his stay in London, he is known to have assisted in cultural exchanges by hiring cinemas to show Indian films and bringing Indian film personalities to London for shows, a show by Lata Mangeshkar at the Royal Albert Hall in 1974 being a notable one. He returned to India in 2013. He was honored by the Government of India, in 2000, with the fourth highest Indian civilian award of Padma Shri.

== See also ==
- V. K. Krishna Menon
