= D. D. Thacker =

Coal miner and philanthropist

D. D. Thacker (1884–1961) better known as Diwan Bahadur D. D. Thacker was a noted coal miner and philanthropist from Jharia, Dhanbad.

== Biography ==
He was born in a Gujarati family in Bhuj in Princely State of Cutch and did his preliminary education there. He was attracted to coal mining business due to his connection with Mistris of Kutch, who had taken leadership in Jharia coal mining belt. He started his career as coal agent around 1900, later he entered into coal mining in 1905 when in partnership with Seth Khora Ramji & Brothers, he purchased Pure Jharia Colliery located in Jharia. After death of Seth Khora Ramji in 1923, however, he became sole proprietor of Pure Jharia Colliery, purchasing the stake from heirs of Khora Ramji. Later on he vigorously expanded his coal mining as well coal trading business and purchased several mines in Bengal & Bihar.

During his lifetime he held several posts like, chairman and Secretary of the Indian Mining Federation, the President of The Geological, Mining and Metallurgical Society of India, Further, he also held post of Honorary First Class Magistrate of Jhaira He also served as President of the Bihar Chamber of Commerce, the Indian Colliery Owners' Association in his lifetime. He was among the patron and trustees of Jharia Anglo-Gujarati School.

In 1928–29, Pure Jharia Colliery owned by him started a primary school for the benefit of the children of labour working in his mines. Further, in 1939–40, he also started a Labour's School in Jharia to train labours for coalmines, the school was then called Rao Bahadur D. D. Thacker's Labourers' School. In 1954, he donated money to award a Gold Medal called Dewan Bahadur D. D. Thacker Coal Mining Gold Medal to be awarded annually for works of merit and research in field of coal mining. Even today the above gold medal award is considered to be very prestigious and awarded annually by The Mining, Geological and Metallurgical Institute of India to persons excelling in field of coal mines industry in India. In 1954 he donated money to commemorate a running shield trophy for sports held in coal mining community.

He died in 1961 and his coal mine business was carried on by his sons under name and style of D. D. Thacker & Sons, which was finally taken over by Government of India after nationalization of coal mines in 1972.
