= Raja Talab =

Man-made lake

Coordinates: 23.745°N 86.415°E

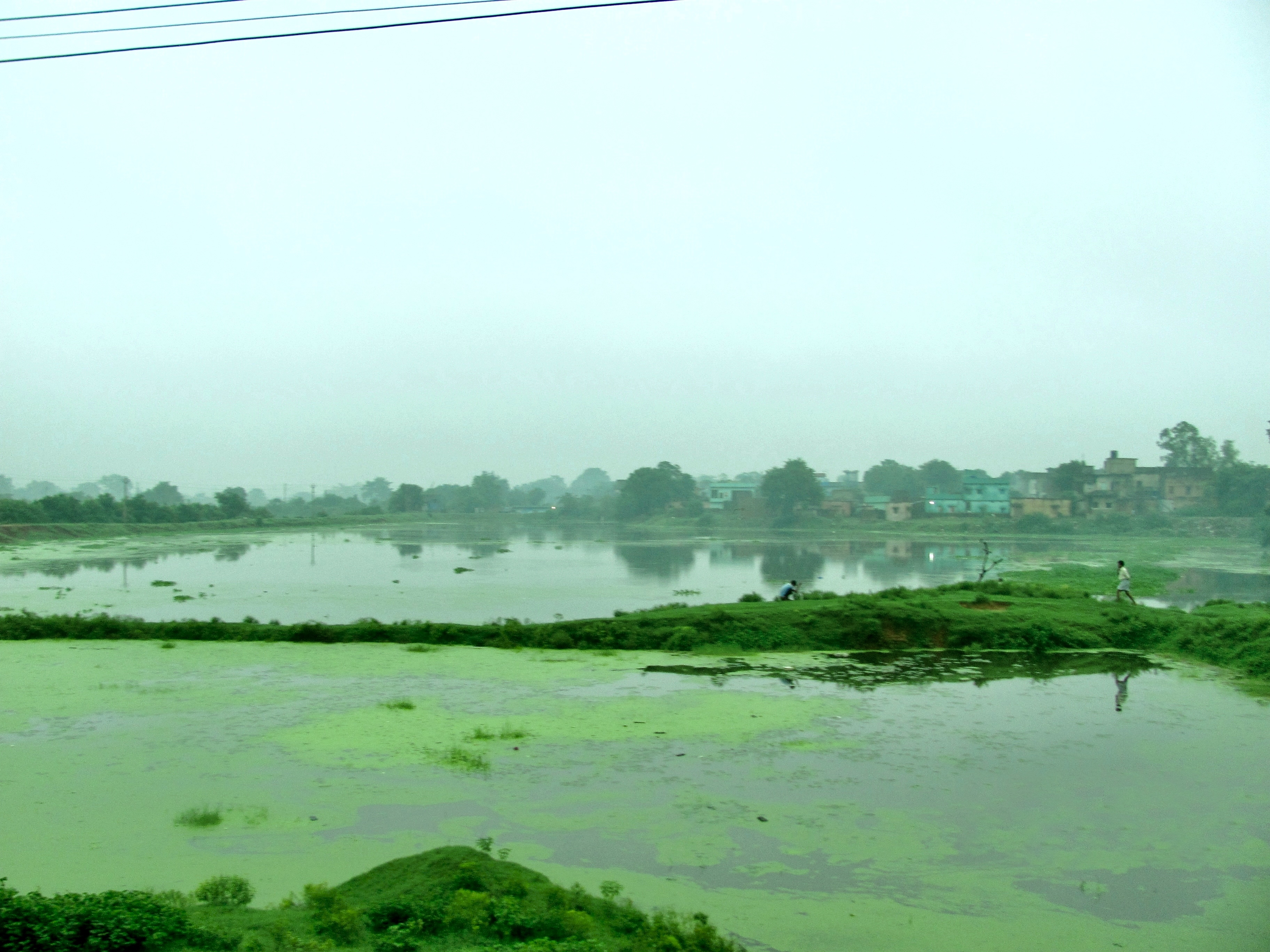

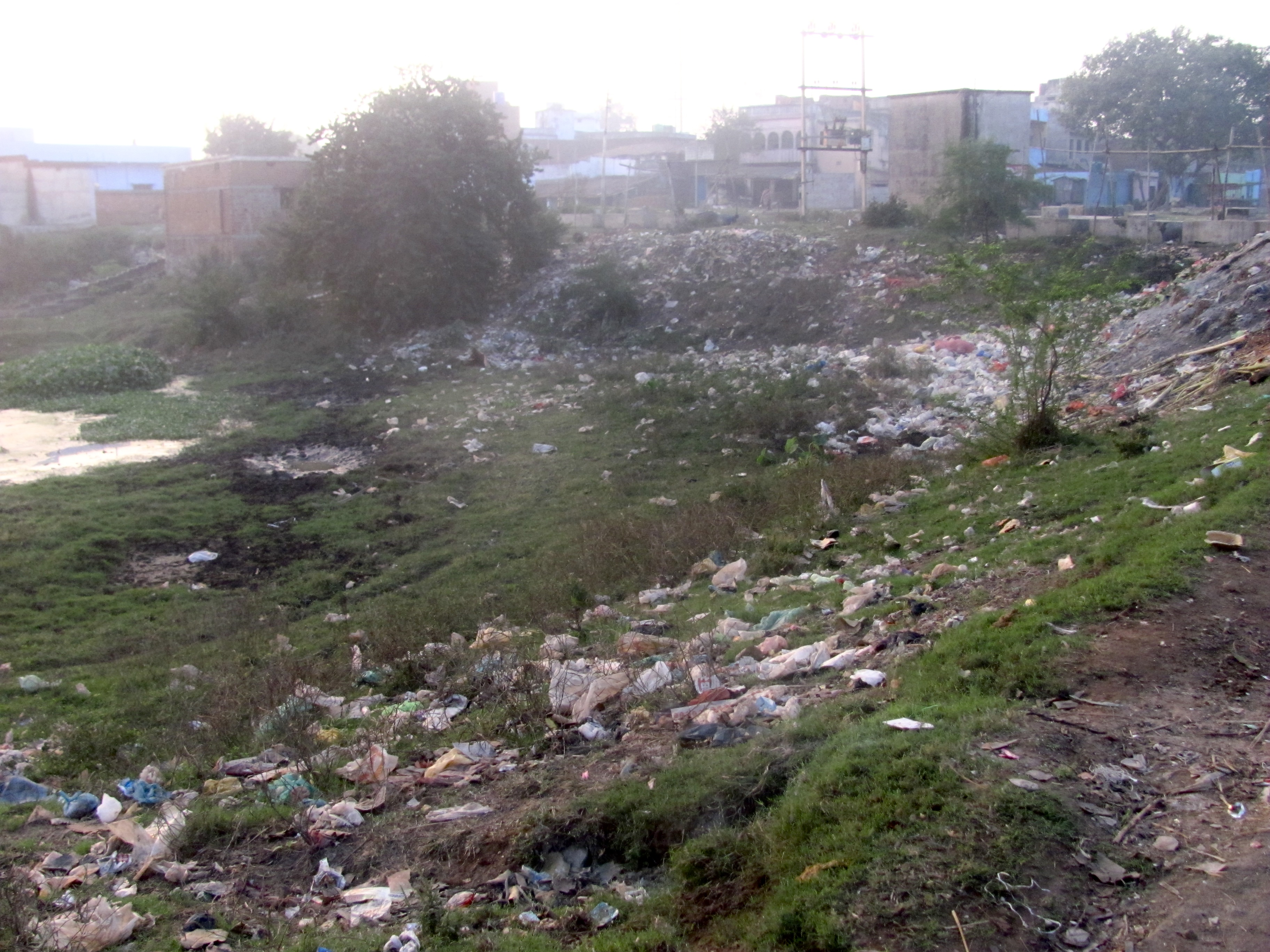

Raja Talab is a large man-made lake located at Jharia Jharkhand, India.

== Construction ==
The lake was built at Jharia by Raja Durga Prasad Singh, the Raja of Jharia during his reign in the years 1912–13. After death of Raja Durga Prasad in 1916, his successor, Raja Shiva Prasad Singh further developed the lake - put up embankments and beautified the lake. The pond was used also for the royal - Rajbari Durga Puja being celebrated by Rajas of Jharia and they used to bathe in this lake before entering the royal Durga temple near the lake.

== Description ==
The lake is spread over an area of 8.46 acres of huge water body having a diameter of 100 meters. There is also a small island in middle of the lake. The lake water was once pure enough for drinking during pre-independence days of Jharia Raj.

However, the years of dumping of garbage, sewage outlet, washing of clothes, cattle, immersion of Durga Puja idols, and Chhath Puja offerings had clogged lake and left lake water stagnated and stinking. The last study was done in 2007 by ISM-Dhanbad's department of environmental science engineering under Impact of Coal Mining in Jharia Town. The study found its water was alkaline with a pH of 8.11, while cations and anions were greater than the limit prescribed by the World Health Organization.

The local people and some politicians including members of Jharia Raj family started an agitation in 2013–14, which resulted in authorities sanctioning money for desilting, clean up and complete rehabilitation of lake with help of local mining company, Bharat Coking Coal.

The lake is now being restored to its past glory.
