= Raja Shiva Prasad College =

Arts school in Jharia, India

- Type: Undergraduate and Postgraduate college
- Affiliations: Binod Bihari Mahto Koyalanchal University
- Principal: J. N. Singh
- Location: Belgariya, Dhanbad - Sindri Rd, Rajapur,, Jharia, Jharkhand, 828111, India; 23.750878°N 86.4095097°E
- Campus: Sub Urban
- Website: www.rspcollege.org
- Location in Jharkhand Raja Shiva Prasad College (India)

Raja Shiva Prasad College is an undergraduate school for arts and science and also postgraduate college for commerce located on Jharia-Dhanbad Road near Jharia at Bhagatdih, Jharkhand. It was shifted to Belgaria, 5 km away, in 2018, because of underground mine fire.

== History ==
The erstwhile Raja of Jharia, Raja Kali Prasad Singh felt a need for college in the region and he constituted a trust for establishing the college in 1949 to start Raja Shiv Prasad College in the memory of his father, late Raja Shiva Prasad Singh. The college finally came into existence in year 1951. It is the oldest college of the Dhanbad district and surrounding area.

== Affiliations ==
In 1951 the college secured temporary affiliation with Patna University. A year later in 1952 Bihar University granted permanent affiliation to the college. In 1960 with the establishment of Ranchi University it got affiliated to it. Previously it was affiliated to the Vinoba Bhave University, which was established in 1992. The college is now affiliated to the Binod Bihari Mahto Koyalanchal University, Dhanbad from 2017.

== Courses ==
The college offers undergraduate courses in Bachelor of Arts and Bachelor of Science degrees. In Commerce it offers both undergraduate Bachelor of Commerce and graduate Doctorate courses. Further, it also offers Bachelor of Education and Bachelor of Business Administration courses.

== See also ==
- Education in India
- Literacy in India
- List of institutions of higher education in Jharkhand
