= Jharia Raj =

Zamindari estate

Jharia Raj / Jharia Estate was a Zamindari estate in British India, located at Jharia in Bihar province of the Bengal Presidency now in Jharkhand.

The present Jharia house is an offshoot of Palganj in Hazaribagh and was formerly established at Katrasgarh. Even today the ancestral house cum fort of Jharia Raj family stands at Katras. As per family history, the zamindars were originally from Rewa in Central India and established their kingdom in the area around Jharia in year 1763. In 1864 the Jainagar estate was bought by the Jharia estate. The village of Katras contains the residence of the zamindar, which according to tradition was formerly the head-quarters of the Jharia Raj before this was split up into the separate houses of Katras, Jharia and Nawagarh. It became one of the richest zamindari estates of Bengal Presidency after the coal was discovered in the lands underneath and mining started in decade of 1890 in the area.

Among the notable zamindars of Jharia Raj were, Raja Durga Prasad Singh who inherited estate in 1850s when he was still a minor. Durga died in 1916, who was succeeded by Raja Shiva Prasad Singh. Shiva Prasad died in January 1947 and his eldest son, Shri Kali Prasad Singh became the last Raja of Zharia till the zamindari was abolished in 1952.

The major coal mining areas were in the five big estates - Jharia Raj, Nawagarh Raj, Katrasgarh Raj, Tundi Raj and Pandra Raj, which covered the entire area between the Damodar and Barakar rivers in what was then Manbhum district, which later became Dhanbad district.

The Jharia Raj area was first surveyed and mapped by T.W.H. Hughes in 1866, and in 1890 by T. H. Ward who estimated 804 million tons of good coal reserve. Earlier, in 1858 Messrs. Borrodaile and Co. had applied for a lease for the whole of Jharia estate. The Estate or Raj was at that time under the Court of Wards for a lease to mine coal in the Jharia estate was not granted. The first lease were not given before 1890. In 1895, Dhanbad, Jharia, Katras, Kusunda and Patherdih were connected by railway lines via Asansol to Calcutta and this considerably helped mining industry of this area to take off in a big scale. With the railways came the Gujarati people as an expert railway contractor with an experience of railway construction work at Thane. They met the then Raja of Jharia and purchased some land having underneath a vast wealth in the shape of coals on lease. Among, them the pioneer Indian was Khora Ramji, which was also acknowledged by British gazetteer. By early 1900s there were several coal mines operating in Jharia coalfields belt, which was now connected to Calcutta by a train link and the Jharia Raj began to prosper with the income coming from royalties and migrant population and Jharia becoming a major coal mining hub and business center in rival to Ranigunj coal region. There was intense competition between mine owners of the major coalfields, Jharia and Raniganj and by 1907 Jharia was yielding half of India's output. One of its oldest mines was Khas Jharia owned by Khora Ramji.

The Jharia Raj was part of Manbhum district, the headquarters of which was Bangsoorna later shifted to Govindpur. In 1904 it was decided by Sir Andrew Fraser, the Governor of Bengal that the headquarters of the subdivision should be transferred from Govindpur to Dhanbad. The actual transfer, however, took place on 27 June 1908. With the transfer of headquarters at Dhanbad various amenities were provided, which attracted people to habitate in the Raj.

Among the legacy and monuments, which stand today at Jharia - Dhanbad are Jharia Raj High School - the oldest school of the region founded in 1866, Raja Shiva Prasad College - founded in 1951 by Raja Kali Prasad Singh in memory of his father, Raja Talab - a huge water tank, which is now being conserved - which was built by Raja Durga Prasad Singh in 1912-13 to fulfill water needs of its population. Further, as late in 1985, Raja Kali Prasad Singh was instrumental in starting Kids Garden Secondary School at Jharia.

Also the traditional Durga Puja started by the royal family in 1861 is still an attraction of the town, which takes place at old fort - the Purana Rajgarh, the ancestral palace of the family. The puja is performed at three places — at the temple near the old fort, the temple at the new fort and at Shira Ghar, the place where the kuldevta and the weapons of the royal family are kept.

Raja Shiv Prasad Singh married Rani Mandakini Devi and had five sons - Raja Kali Prasad Singh, Tara Prasad Singh, Shyama Prasad Singh, Uma Prasad Singh, Rama Prasad Singh. He was succeeded by his eldest son Raja Kali Prasad Singh, who was last Zamindar of Jharia Raj, after which in 1951 Zamindari was abolished in India

Raja Kali Prasad Singh tried his hands in politics and contested in the elections of 1952 and won from Sindri constituency for the first time. Although, he was an influential person and held major clout in the area, which was once his Raj but he was in his home constituency defeated by Purushottam K. Chauhan, a popular freedom fighter, coal miner and labor leader from Dhanbad. However, he won from Baliapur near Sindri on Jharkhand Party ticket. The family never contested elections ever since but continue to have a strong clout and influence in area even now. Currently, Madhavi Singh, wife of Jharia royal family scion Sujit Prasad Singh, is politically active. Also, daughter in law of Raja Kali Prasad Singh, Snehalata Kumari Devi, wife of Raja Bishweshwar Prasad Singh is active in politics. She is the General Secretary of BJP (Orissa) Sambalpur.
