= Binod Bihari Mahto Koyalanchal University =

State university in Jharkhand, India

- University Logo
- Other name: BBMKU
- Motto: Tamaso Ma Jyotirgamaya
- Motto in English: Lead Me From Darkness To Light
- Type: Public State University
- Established: 23 March 2017; 9 years ago
- Accreditation: NAAC
- Academic affiliations: UGC; AIU; BCI
- Chancellor: Governor of Jharkhand
- Vice-Chancellor: Dr. Ram Kumar Singh
- Academic staff: 160
- Administrative staff: 240
- Students: 1,00,000+
- Postgraduates: 25,000+
- Doctoral students: 8,000+
- Location: Dhanbad, Jharkhand, 826001, India; 23.8336°N 86.4444°E
- Campus: Urban
- Website: bbmku.ac.in

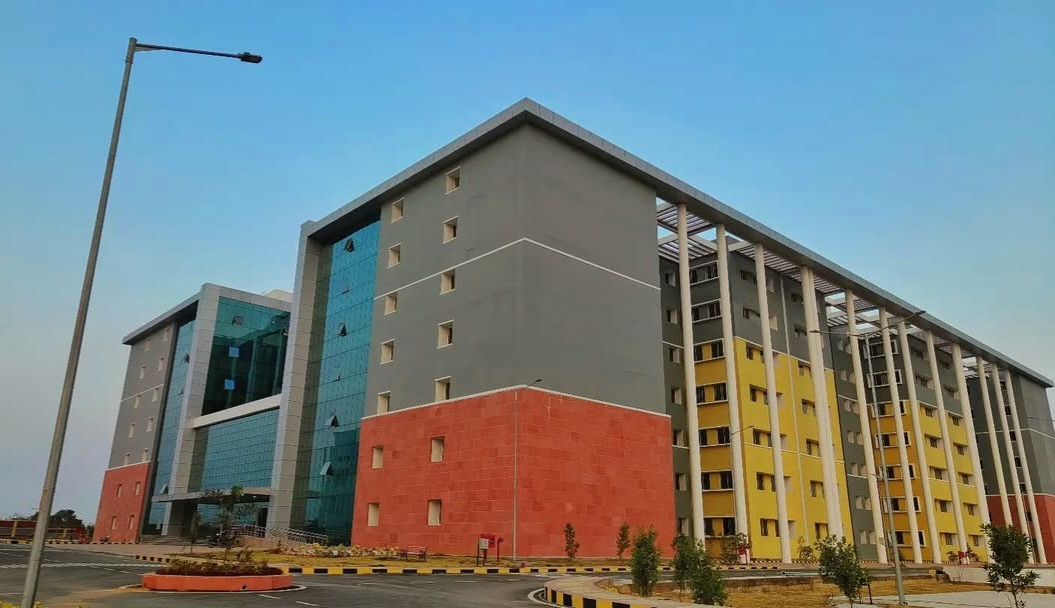
Academic block of Binod Bihari Mahto Koyalanchal University

Binod Bihari Mahto Koyalanchal University is a state university located in Dhanbad, Jharkhand, India. It oversees colleges across Dhanbad and Bokaro districts, including 13 constituent and 23 affiliated colleges, as well as institutions offering B.Ed., law, nursing, medical and pharmacy programs. The university offers undergraduate and postgraduate courses through 28 postgraduate departments and is officially recognised by University Grants Commission.

== History ==
Binod Bihari Mahto Koyalanchal University, Dhanbad came into existence by the Jharkhand Government notification of 23 March 2017, published as Gazettes notifiction No. 216 (Extra Ordinary) dated 11 April 2017. The foundation stone of the university campus was laid on 13 November and is recognised by UGC, New Delhi. 2017 by the Chief Minister of Jharakhand, Raghubar Das.

== Academics ==
The university offers undergraduate and postgraduate courses with 21 postgraduate departments, which includes the department of management, education, mass communication, art & culture, law, foreign languages, life science, computer science, environmental science and disaster management.

== Affiliated colleges ==
As of 2021, the university has 10 constituent colleges, 20 affiliated colleges and 26 B.Ed. colleges spread in Bokaro and Dhanbad districts of Jharkhand.

=== Constituent colleges ===
- P. K. Roy Memorial College Dhanbad
- Bokaro Steel City College, Bokaro
- S.S.L.N.T. Mahila College, Dhanbad
- R.S.P. College, Jharia
- R.S. More College, Govindpur
- B.S.K. College, Maithon
- Katras College, Katrasgarh
- Sindri College, Sindri
- Chas College, Chas
- K. B. College, Bermo
- Degree College, Gomia
- Degree College, Tundi

=== Affiliated colleges ===
- R.V.S. College, Chas
- Bindeshwari Dubey College, Pichari
- Tenughat College, Tenughat
- R.P.S. College, Chandrapura
- Bokaro Mahila College, Bokaro
- Swami Sahjanand College, Chas
- Vishthapith College, Balidih, Bokaro Steel City
- J.S.M. College, Phusro
- DAV Mahila College, Katrashgarh
- B.S.S. Mahila College, Dhanbad
- B.B.M. College, Baliapur
- Rajganj College, Rajganj
- Pandit Nehru Memorial
- KSGM College, Nirsa
- Baghmar College, Baghmara
- Mahuda College, Mahuda
- NP Evening College, Chira
- Shibu Soren Degree College, Dubrajpur, Tundi
- Rainbow Degree College, Chira
- Bokaro Thermal Sandhyakalin Degree College, Bokaro
- Shamshul Haque Memorial Evening Degree College, Dhanbad
- Gurunanak College, Dhanbad
- Dhanbad School of Nursing
- A.G. College of Nursing, Jainamore
- Law College Dhanbad
- Immamul Haq Khan Law College, Bokaro
- SNMCH

== See also ==
- Kazi Nazrul University, Asansol
- Edu College, Chandankiyaricat ion in India
- List of institutions of higher education in Jharkhand
