= Reha Mota =

Reha Mota Reha Mota
- village
- Location in Gujarat, India Reha Mota (India)
- Coordinates: 23.151725°N 69.750086°E
- Country: India
- State: Gujarat
- District: Kachchh

Languages
  - Official: Gujarati, Hindi
- Time zone: UTC+5:30 (IST)
- Telephone code: 02832
- Vehicle registration: GJ-12-
- Nearest city: Bhuj - 370001
- Website: gujaratindia.com

Reha Mota is a village in Bhuj Taluka of Kutch at a distance of about 15 km from Bhuj town, the capital of Kachchh District of Gujarat State in India.The village is one of the 18 villages founded by Mistris of Kutch.
