= Jharkhand Academic Council =

Board of education in Jharkhand, India

- झारखण्ड अधिविद्य परिषद्
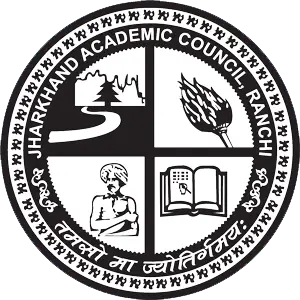
- Seal of the Jharkhand Academic Council
- Abbreviation: JAC
- Established: 7 February 2003; 23 years ago
- Type: State Government School Education Board
- Legal status: Active
- Headquarters: Gyandeep Campus, Namkum, Ranchi, Jharkhand – 834 010
- Region served: Jharkhand
- Official language: Hindi; English
- Chairman: Dr. Natwa Hansdak
- Director: Ravi Tudu, IAS
- Parent organization: Government of Jharkhand
- Affiliations: Department of School Education & Literacy, Government of Jharkhand (DoSE&L)
- Staff: 865
- Students: Approx 8 Lakhs
- Website: jac.jharkhand.gov.in

Jharkhand Academic Council (abbreviated as JAC), is a state government agency responsible for academic administration in the state of Jharkhand, India. The agency is amended to supervise the government recognized academic institutions, including primary and higher secondary schools. It was established by the government of Jharkhand after the enactment of the Jharkhand Academic Council Act, 2003 by the state legislature and governor. JAC was primarily constituted for conducting intermediate, secondary, and madrasa-level examinations of the candidates registered with government-recognized institutions (JAC-affiliated). Dr. Natwa Hansdak appointed as new JAC Chairman on 6 February, 2024.

== History ==
The JAC, formerly known as Jharkhand Intermediate Council (JIC), first came into consideration on 15 November 2000 after the state was formed by the Government of India. Three years after Jharkhand was formed, the state legislature enacted Jharkhand Academic Council Act 2003 to constitute a state government agency and hence, the Jharkhand Academic Council came into existence. The agency was initially housed in a rented building at Rameshwaram, Ranchi due to the unavailability of official accommodation in the state. At present, JAC is functioning from its official office situated in Gyandeep Campus, Namkum, Ranchi which was inaugurated in 2003 by the chief minister of the state.

== Duties and functions ==
The major functions and duties of the JAC are amended by the Act, 2003, 2000 and recognition rules, 2005, 2006 and recognition rule, 2008 enacted by the state government.

- To grant permission for opening and closing of intermediate college, elementary and secondary-level institutions under its jurisdiction.
- To specify the courses of instruction and prescribe syllabus.
- To select textbooks for the prescribed examinations.
- To publish the results at the secondary school and higher secondary levels.
- To grant diplomas or certificates to eligible students who have passed its examination.
- To recognize or de-recognize educational institutions at the secondary or higher secondary level.
- To conduct inspections of government recognized institutions, ensuring that required facilitates are available and functions of staff.
- To cancel registration of any registered private institution that do not meet the proper conditions.
- To supervise the institutions affiliated to it, and exercise various other powers amended to it by law.
- They Also Release model Question Paper and Question Bank For Students For Understand The New Board Pattern And Way Of Asking the Question in Board Exam.

== See also ==
Bihar School Examination Board
Board of Secondary Education, Assam
