= Dhanbad =

- Metropolis
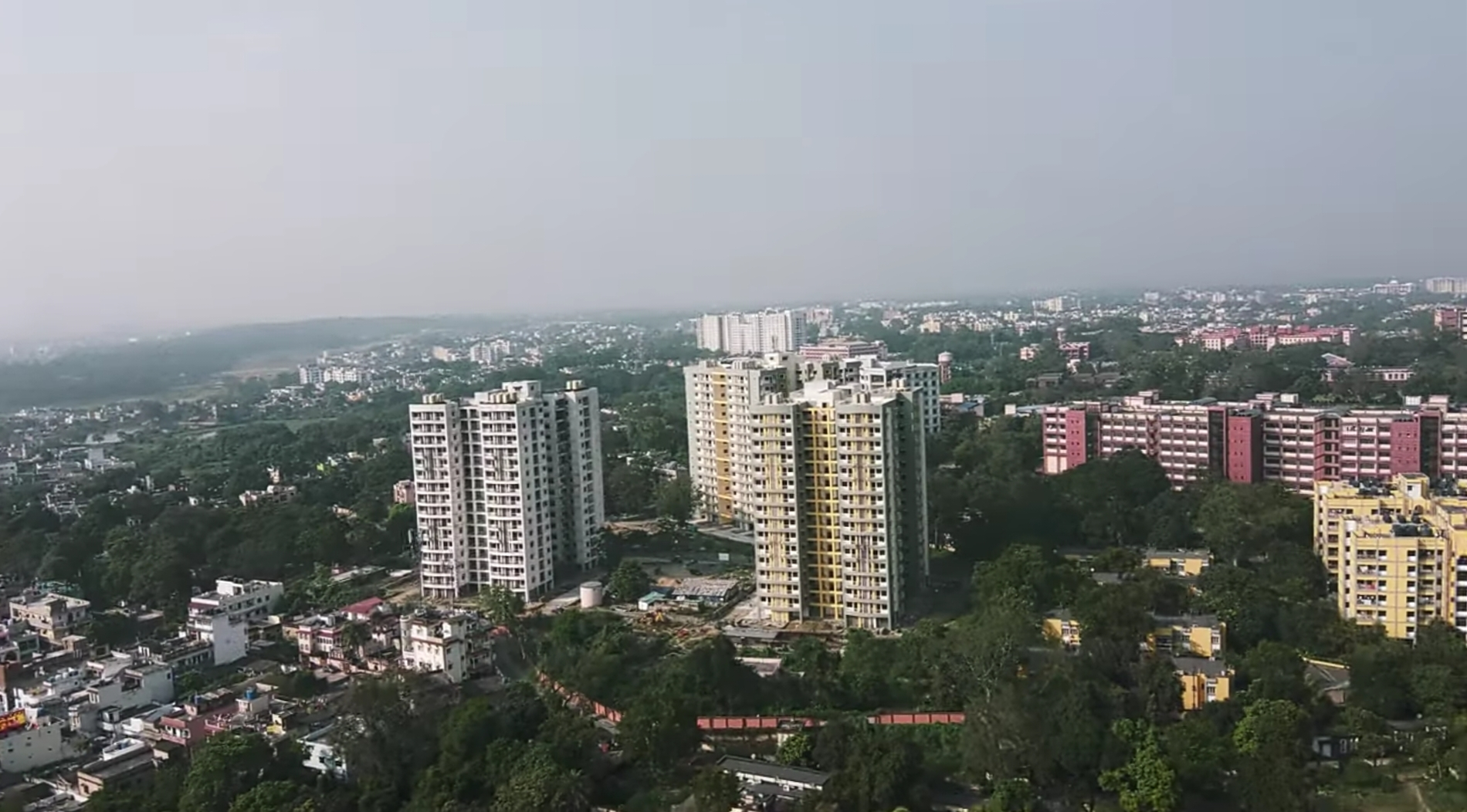
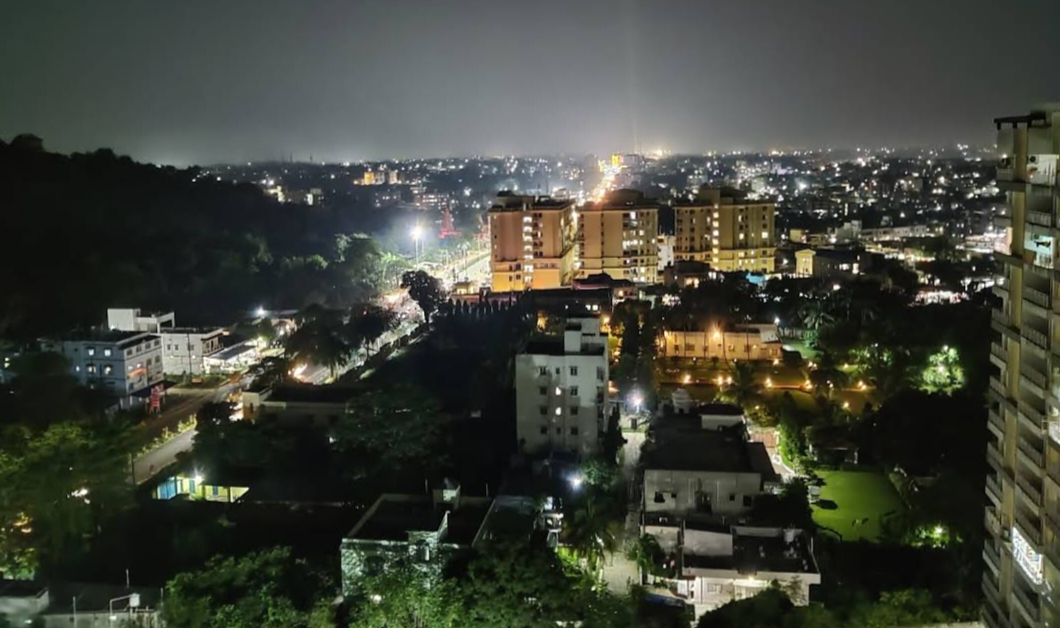
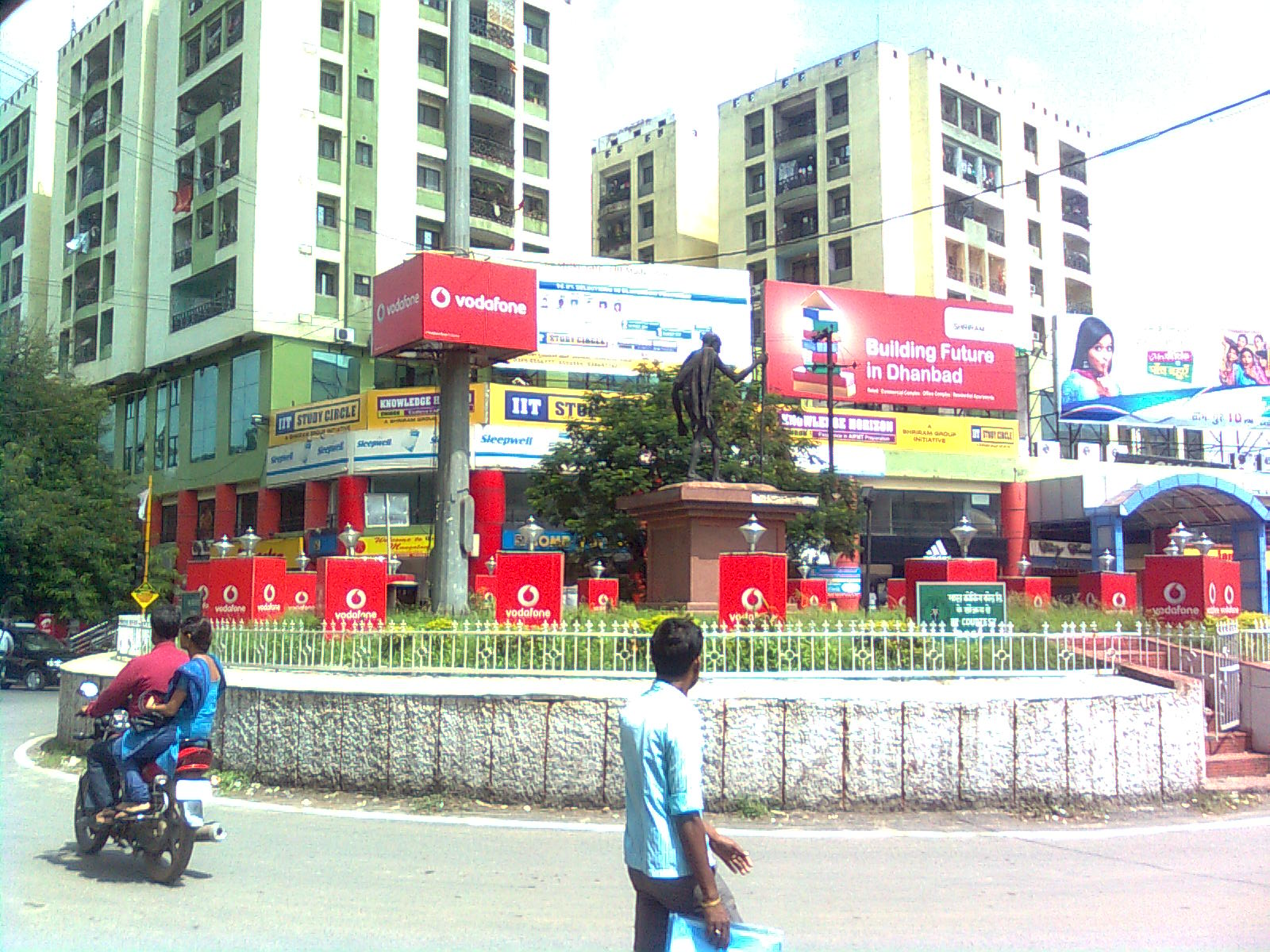
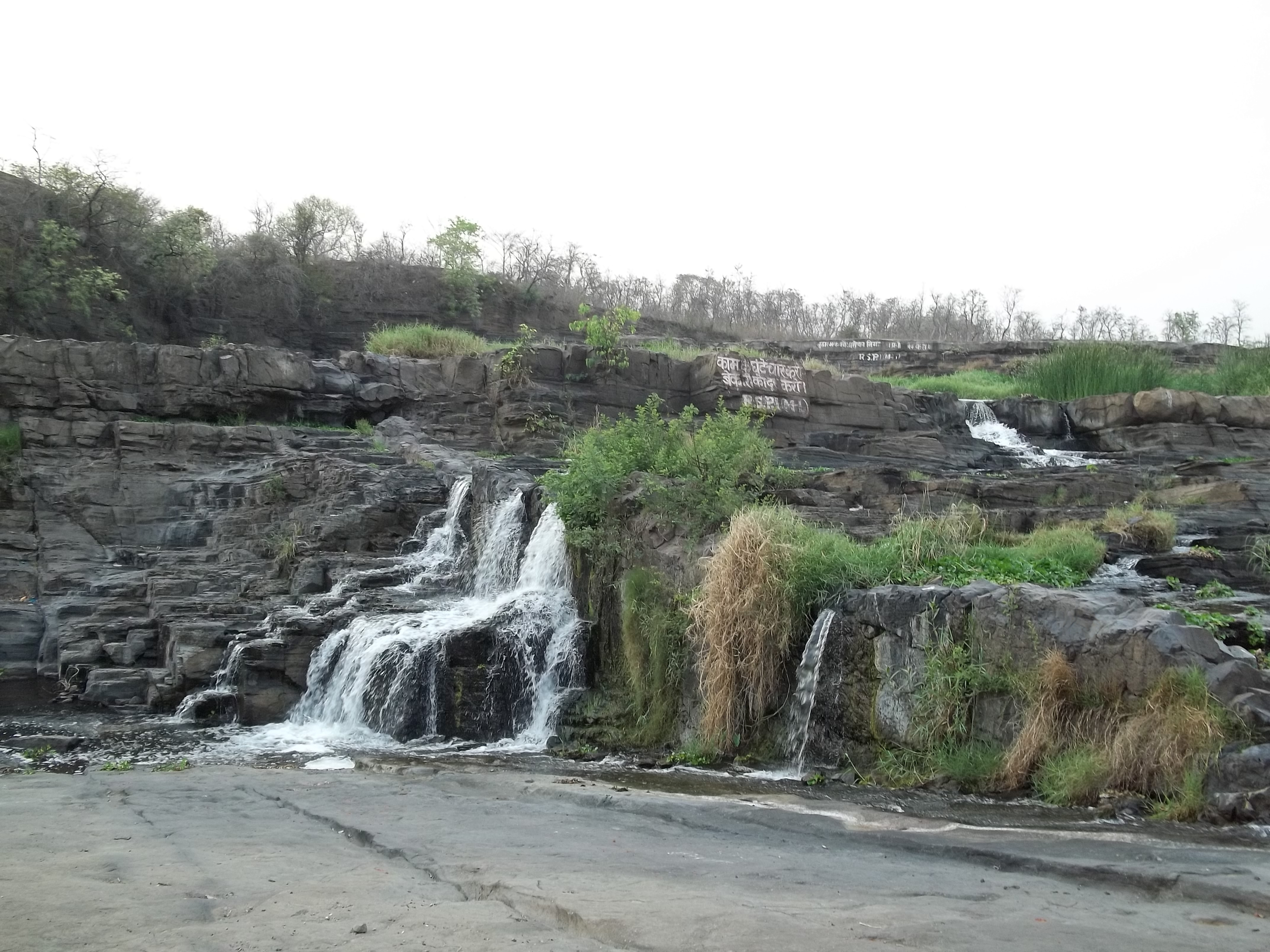
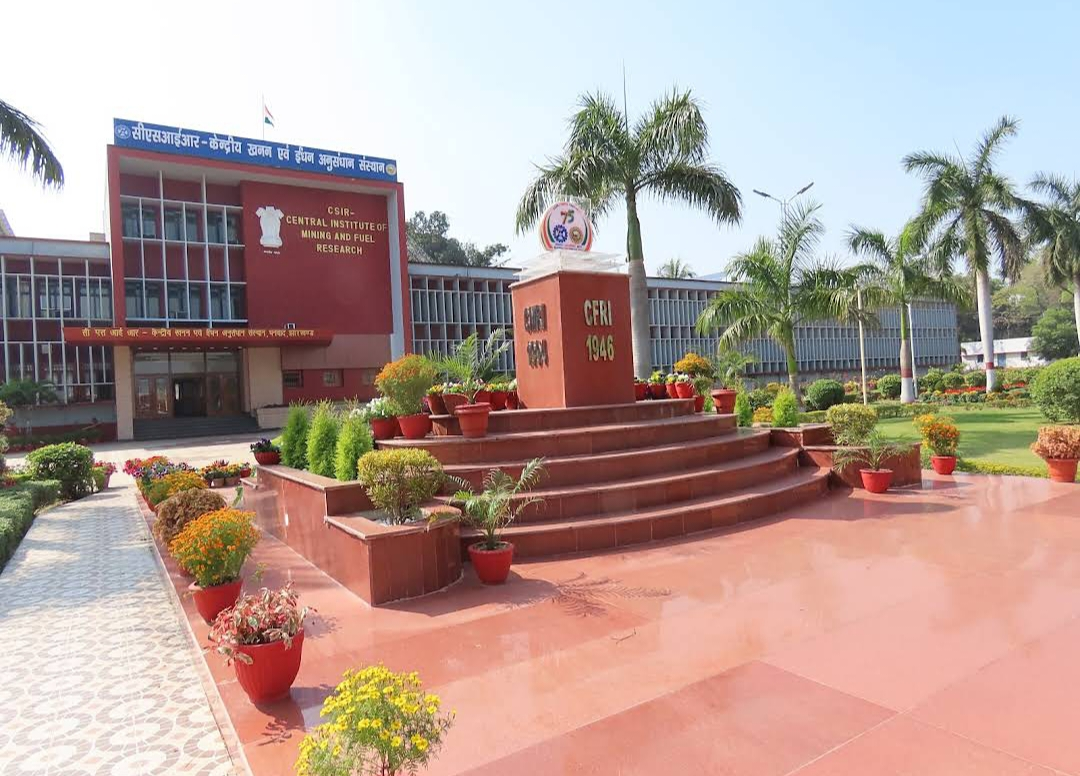
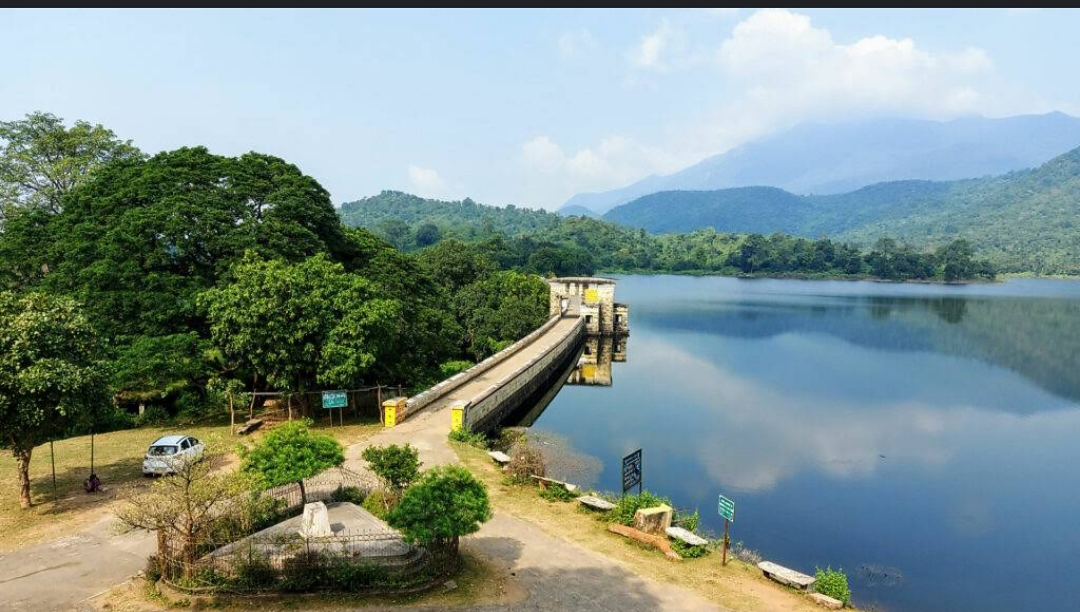
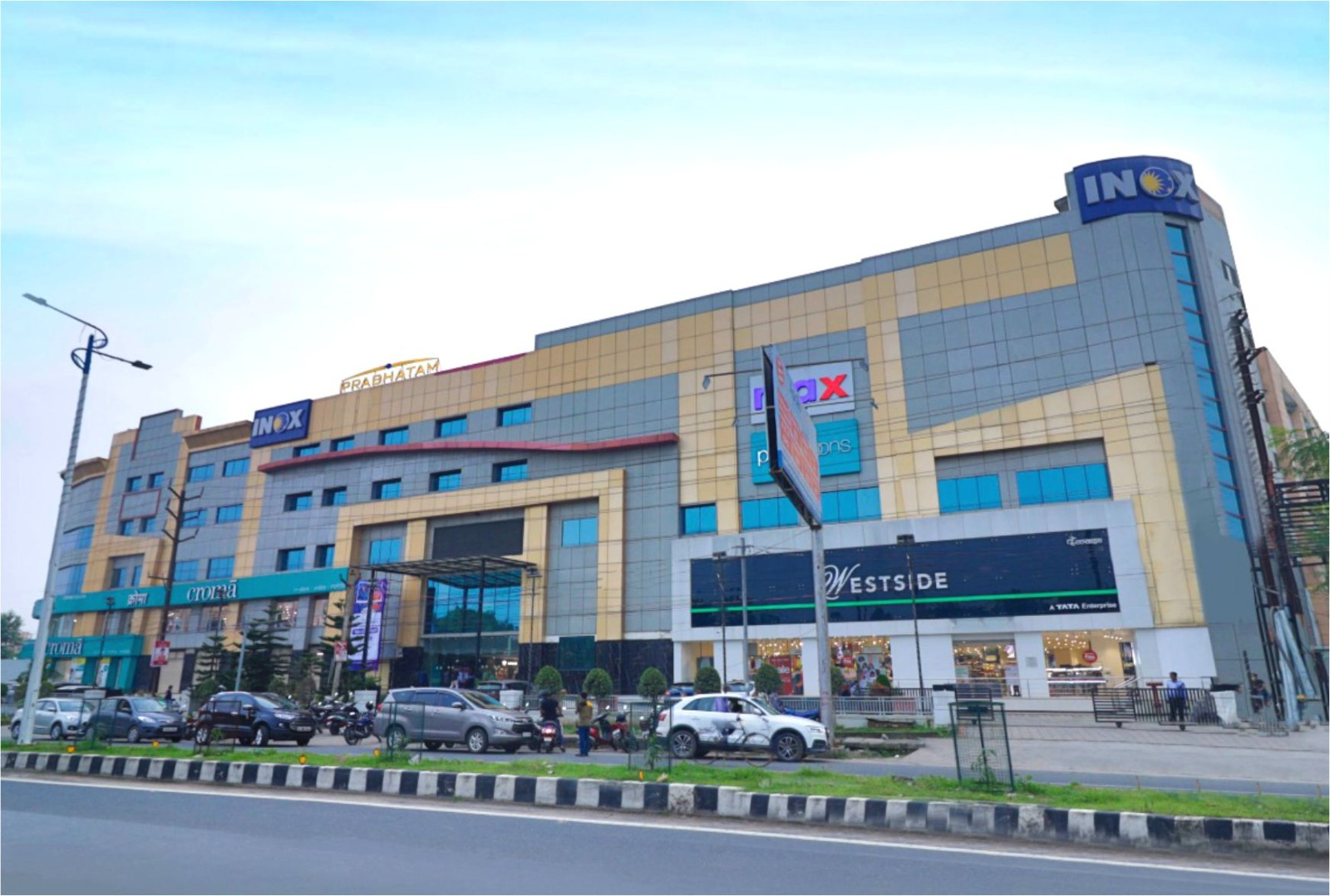
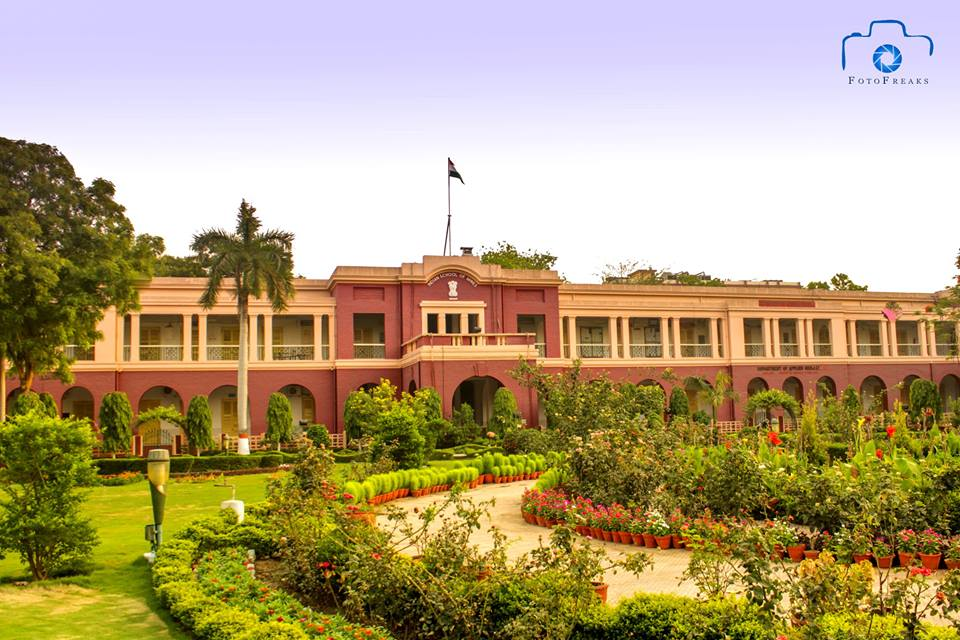
- Skyline of city City view at night Road view Bhatinda falls CIMFR Dhanbad Topchanchi lake Prabhatam Mall Heritage Building at IIT (ISM) Dhanbad
- Nicknames: 'Coal Capital of India', 'Koylanchal'
- Motto: City For All
- Location of Dhanbad in Jharkhand
- Coordinates: 23.7998°N 86.4305°E
- Country: India
- State: Jharkhand
- District: Dhanbad
- Established: 1956 from Manbhum

Government
  - Type: Municipal governance in India (Municipal corporation)
  - Body: Dhanbad Municipal Corporation
  - Mayor: Chandrashekhar Agarwal (BJP)

Area
  - Metropolis: 275 km^{2} (106 sq mi)
  - Metro: 577 km^{2} (223 sq mi)
- Elevation: 69 m (226 ft)

Population (2011)
  - Metropolis: 1,162,472
  - Rank: 33rd
  - Density: 4,230/km^{2} (10,900/sq mi)
  - Metro: 1,333,719
  - Metro rank: 39th

Languages
  - Official: Hindi, English, Bengali, Khortha, Urdu
- Time zone: UTC+5:30 (IST)
- PIN: 826001
- Telephone Code: 0326
- Vehicle registration: JH-10
- Metro GDP (PPP): $95 million to $110 million
- Website: www.dhanbad.nic.in

DhanbadHindi pronunciation: [dʱənˌbɐːd̪] is the second-most populated city in the Indian state of Jharkhand after Jamshedpur and a major financial hub of Jharkhand. In terms of economy, Dhanbad has the largest economy in the state of and is often referred to as the 'economic capital of Jharkhand'. Dhanbad is also an emerging center for manufacturing industries. The Dhanbad district is known for its cultural heritage and has few tourist attractions, making it a well-rounded destination. Dhanbad ranks as the 39th largest city in India and is the 33rd largest million-plus urban agglomeration in India. The Dhanbad railway division generates the highest revenue in India. Dhanbad shares its land borders with the Paschim Bardhaman district and the Purulia district of West Bengal and Bokaro, and the Giridih and Jamtara districts of Jharkhand. The city is called the 'Coal Capital of India' for housing one of the largest coal mines in the country. The prestigious institute Indian School of Mines (now IIT Dhanbad) is situated in Dhanbad. Apart from coal, it has also grown in information technology.

Dhanbad is the 96th fastest growing city in the world, according to the City Mayors Foundation. It is the 56th cleanest city of India, according to the 2019 Swachh Survekshan cleanliness survey. It showed a great change in the city which was considered the dirtiest city in the 2018 Swachh Survekshan. Dhanbad Municipal Corporation works for increasing green cover in the city.

Among the rail divisions of Indian Railway, Dhanbad Rail Division is the largest revenue generator. Dhanbad is ranked as the top city in India with the highest 4G mobile phone network availability in India by a survey of Opensignal.

== History ==
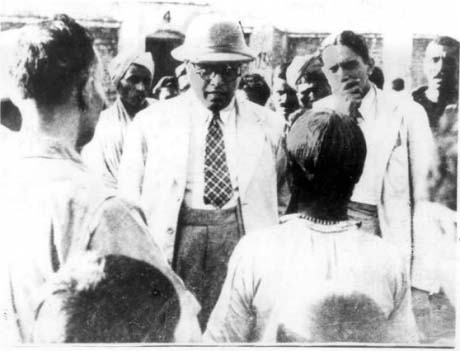
Dr. Ambedkar talking to people as the Labour Minister in the Viceroy's Executive Council at coal mines, Dhanbad

The present district used to be a part of Manbhum region and was occupied by Mundari tribals in the wilderness of South undivided Bihar. In the seventh century A.D. some information is available from the account of the travels of Hieun Tsang. These accounts narrate the existence of a powerful kingdom which comprised the district and adjoining areas, ruled by Sasanka. Manbhum was one of the districts of the East India during the British Raj.

The region has thick forests, with rich mineral resources, and had a mixed demographic profile with people from different religious and social groups, including adivasis, particularly the Santals and the Mundas before the city was established. After the Partition of India, the district became a part of Bihar state, and upon re-organization of the Indian states in the mid-1950s, the district became a part of the West Bengal. Purulia district was carved out of the district of Manbhum.

In the Settlement Report for Manbhum (1928) it was stated that no rock inscriptions, copper plates or old coins were discovered and not a single document of copper plate or palm leaf was found, during the Survey and Settlement operations. The oldest authentic documents produced were all on paper and barely even a hundred years old. Dhanbad city was in Manbhum district from 1928 up to 1956. However, on 24 October 1956, Dhanbad district was carved out of Manbhum district with Dhanbad as District headquarter on the recommendation of the States Reorganization Commission vide notification 1911.

This was done under the commitment and leadership of journalist, Satish Chandra. In the year 2006, Dhanbad celebrated 50 years of being an independent district and city. From 1956 to 14 November 2000, it was under Bihar. At present, it is in Jharkhand, after the creation of the state on 15 November 2000. The discovery of rich deposits of coal in the region caused the city to flourish financially, but also bought notorious coal-mafia and gang wars which continues to this day with areas of city like Wasseypur being most affected by the conflict.

== Geography ==
Dhanbad

Climate chart (precipitation, max. and min. temperature)
J	F	M	A	M	J	J	A	S	O	N	D
17 25 11	18 28 14	18 33 18	22 38 23	49 39 25	192 35 25	342 31 24	311 31 24	282 31 23	105 31 20	7 28 16	5 25 11
- █ Average max. and min. temperatures in °C
- █ Precipitation totals in mm
- Source: IMD
Imperial conversion
J	F	M	A	M	J	J	A	S	O	N	D
0.7 77 52	0.7 82 57	0.7 91 64	0.9 100 73	1.9 102 77	7.6 95 77	13 88 75	12 88 75	11 88 73	4.1 88 68	0.3 82 61	0.2 77 52
- █ Average max. and min. temperatures in °F
- █ Precipitation totals in inches

Dhanbad has an average elevation of 227 m (745 ft). Its geographical length (extending from north to south) is 15 miles (24 km) and the breadth (stretching across east to West) is 10 miles (16 km). It shares its boundaries with West Bengal in the eastern and southern part, Giridih and Dumka in the North and Bokaro District in the west. Dhanbad comes under the Chota Nagpur Plateau.

=== Rivers and lakes ===
The Damodar is a major river of the Chota Nagpur Plateau. It rises in Palamu and flows eastward between the plateaus of Ranchi and Hazaribag. It is joined by the Bokaro, the Konar and the Barakar rivers. The Damodar enters Dhanbad district at its confluence with the Jamuria, a stream which marks the western boundary of Dhanbad with Hazaribagh District. Further east, the Damodar is joined by the Katri River which rises in the foothills below Parasnath and traverses through the coal-field area. The Barakar, which forms the northern boundary of the district, traverses about 77 km. It flows in south westerly direction up to Durgapur and then south till it joins the Damodar near Chirkunda.

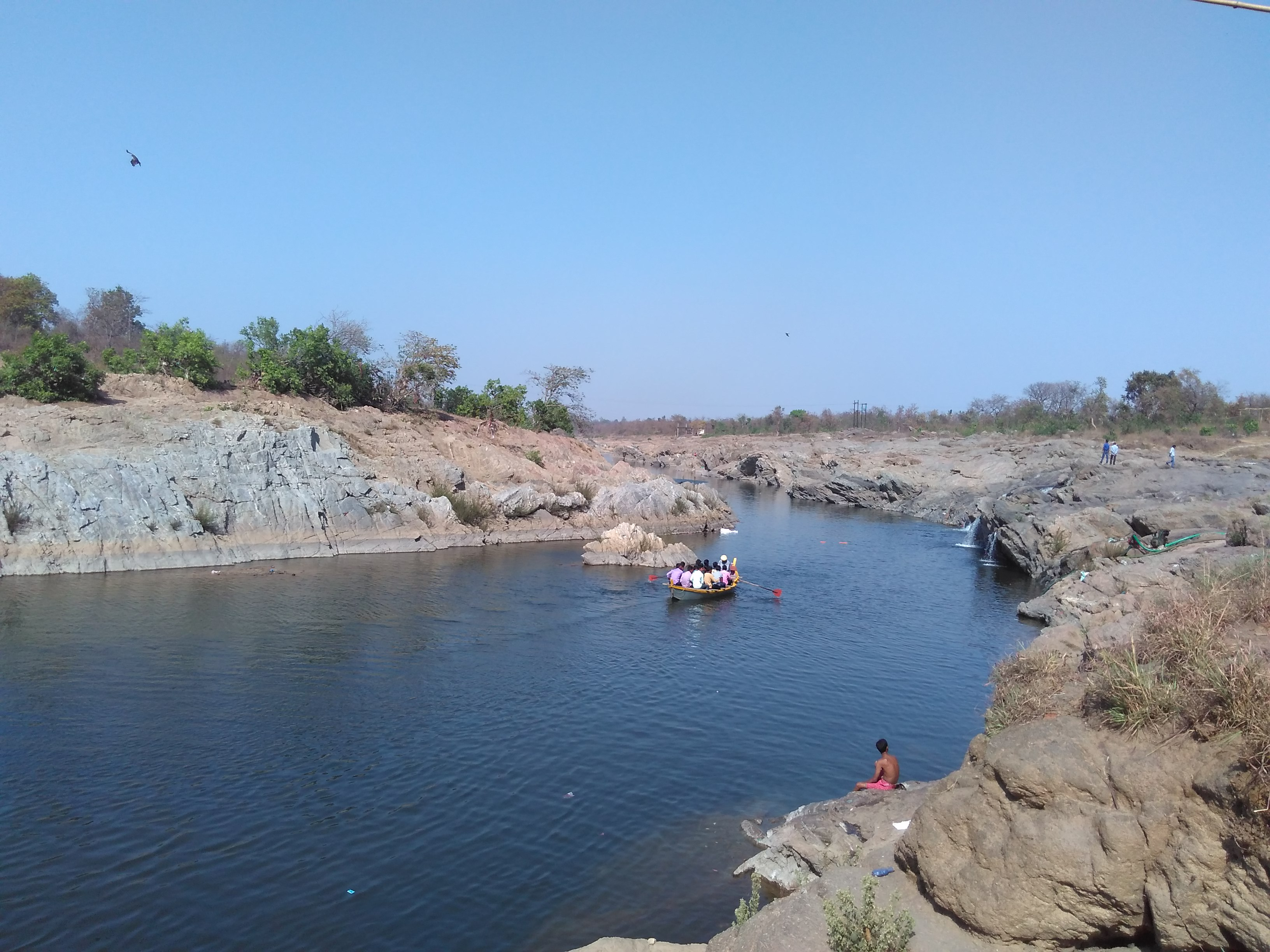
Damodar River

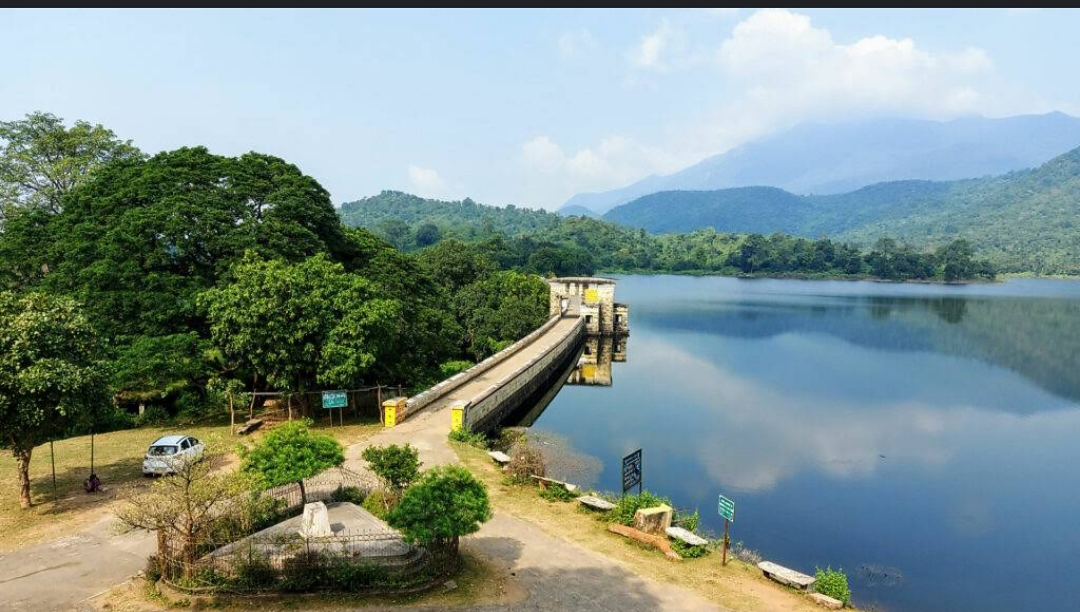
Topchanchi Lake

=== Climate ===
Dhanbad features a climate that is transitional between a humid subtropical climate (Köppen: Cwa) and a tropical wet and dry climate (Aw). Summer starts from the first week of March and ends in mid-July. The peak temperature in summer can reach 48 °C. Dhanbad also receives heavy rainfall. In winter, the minimum temperature remains around 8 °C with a maximum of 25 °C.

Climate data for Dhanbad
Month	Jan	Feb	Mar	Apr	May	Jun	Jul	Aug	Sep	Oct	Nov	Dec	Year
Mean daily maximum °C (°F)	25 (77)	28 (82)	33 (91)	38 (100)	39 (102)	35 (95)	31 (88)	31 (88)	31 (88)	31 (88)	28 (82)	25 (77)	31 (88)
Mean daily minimum °C (°F)	8 (46)	14 (57)	18 (64)	23 (73)	25 (77)	25 (77)	24 (75)	24 (75)	23 (73)	20 (68)	14 (57)	9 (48)	19 (66)
Average precipitation mm (inches)	17 (0.7)	18 (0.7)	18 (0.7)	22 (0.9)	49 (1.9)	192 (7.6)	342 (13.5)	311 (12.2)	282 (11.1)	105 (4.1)	7 (0.3)	5 (0.2)	1,368 (53.9)
Source: IMD

Dhanbad has been ranked 34th best "National Clean Air City" (under Category 1 >10L Population cities) in India.

== Demographics ==
=== Population ===
Religion in Dhanbad (2011)
Religion	Per cent
Hinduism	81.22%
Islam	17.10%
Sikhism	0.65%
Christianity	0.47%
Other or not stated	0.56%

As of 2011 census, Dhanbad City had a population of 1,162,472. Males (614,722) constitute 53% of the population and females (547,750) 47%. It has a sex ratio of 891. Dhanbad has an average literacy rate of 79.47%, higher than the national average of 74.04%: male literacy is 86.14% and female literacy is 71.96%. 10.57% of the population is under 5 years of age.

=== Languages ===
Languages of Dhanbad (2011)
1. Hindi (46.3%)
2. Urdu (11.8%)
3. Khortha (10.6%)
4. Bengali (9.77%)
5. Magahi (8.08%)
6. Bhojpuri (7.20%)
7. Maithili (1.33%)
8. Santali (0.92%)
9. Others (4.00%)

At the time of the 2011 Census of India, 46.32% of the population spoke Hindi, 11.83% Urdu, 10.55% Khortha, 9.77% Bengali, 8.08% Magahi, 7.20% Bhojpuri, 1.33% Maithili and 0.92% Santali as their first language.

== Economy ==
Dhanbad has one of the oldest and largest markets in the region and is also a centre of large scale industries. It is known for its coal mines and industrial establishments; the city is surrounded by about 112 coal mines with a total production of 27.5 million tonnes and an annual income of 700 crore rupees through coal business. There are a number of coal washeries there.

== Education ==
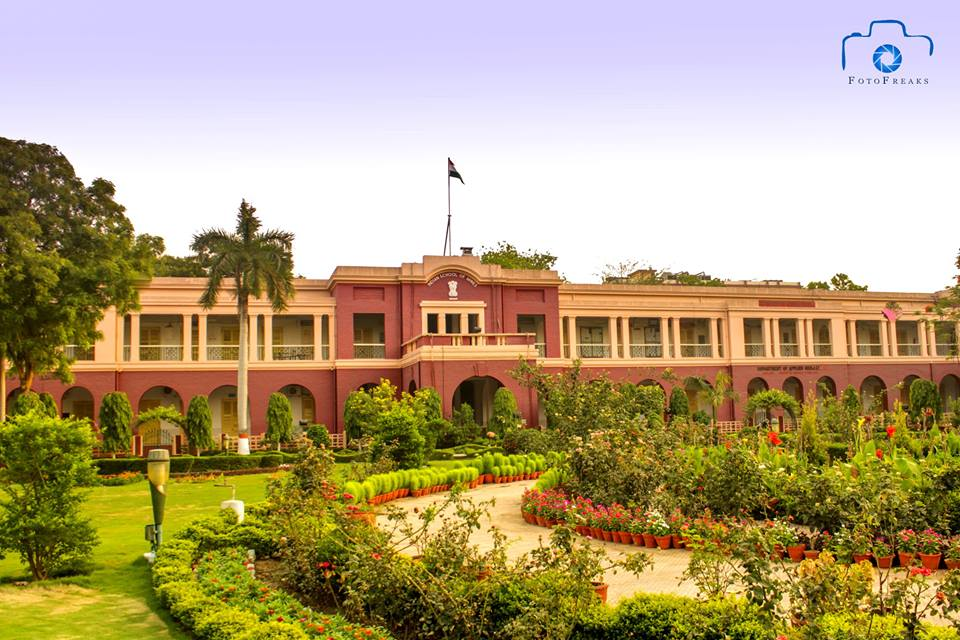
Heritage Building at Indian Institute of Technology (Indian School of Mines), Dhanbad

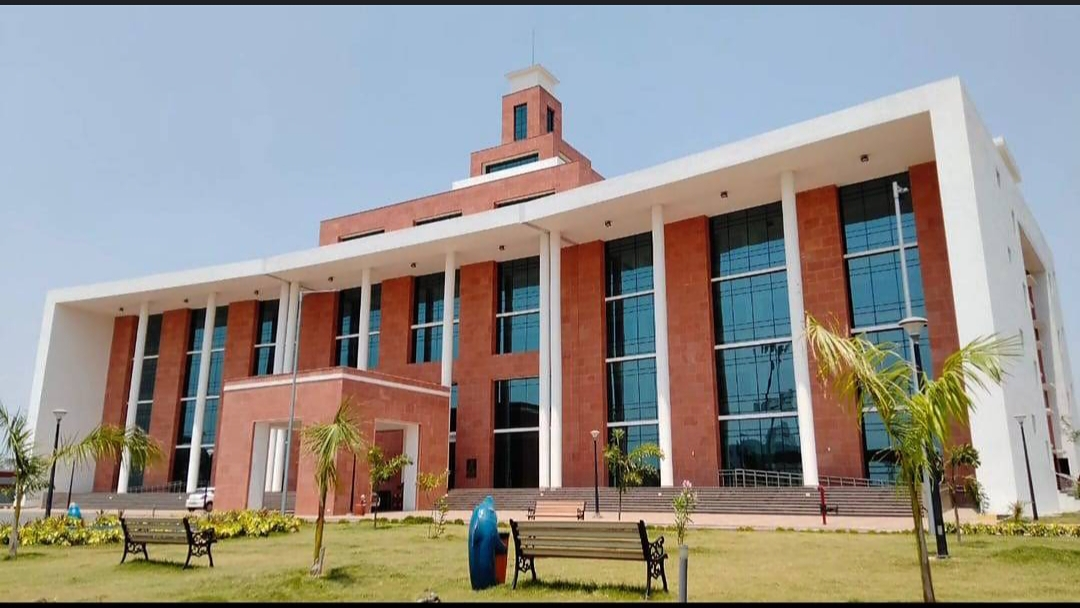
(Binod Bihari Mahto Koyalanchal University)Main Building

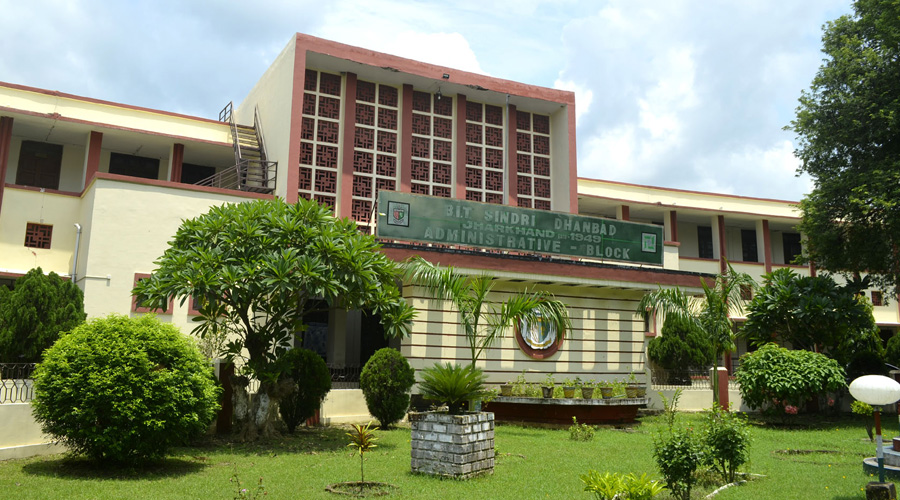
Birsa Institute of Technology Sindri

Dhanbad is a leading center of education in eastern India. The city's education system is followed as of the Indian Education System. Schooling is followed by 10+2+3 plan. Most of the schools in Dhanbad are of CBSE, ICSE and state board. The medium of instruction in schools are Hindi, Santali and Urdu and as well as Bengali and Kurmali. Notable schools in Dhanbad include: Dhanbad Public School – KG Ashram, Carmel School Digwadih, DAV Public School, Delhi Public School, De Nobili School Bhuli, De Nobili School CMRI, De Nobili School FRI, Jawahar Navodaya Vidyalaya, Kendriya Vidyalaya and Tata D.A.V School.

Binod Bihari Mahto Koyalanchal University is the public university of Dhanbad to which many colleges of the region are affiliated. There are various engineering, medical and arts colleges in Dhanbad. Dhanbad is home to some of the leading engineering colleges of India —the Indian Institute of Technology, Birsa Institute of Technology and K. K. College of Engineering and Management. The Indian Institute of Technology (formerly Indian School of Mines), a premier engineering college of India, was established during the British colonial rule in 1926. Birsa Institute of Technology in Sindri is one of the oldest government engineering college in India.

SSLNT Women's College is one of the oldest women's science and art college in east India established in 1956. Raja Shiva Prasad College was established in 1949 by Raja of Jharia. The Patliputra Medical College and Hospital, established in 1971 is a premier medical college. Other major institutions includes Law College, Guru Nanak College, P.K. Roy Memorial College, Bholaram Shibal Kharkia College, B.S.S Mahila College and Al Iqra Teacher's Training College.

== Politics ==
Dhanbad city and district is considered a BJP stronghold with majority of its MPs MLA's being of the party since the 1990s. Chandra Shekhar Agrawal of BJP is the mayor; otherwise known as the first citizen, of Dhanbad Municipal Corporation. He won by the margin of 42,525 votes.

Raj Sinha of Bharatiya Janata Party (BJP) won in the 40-Dhanbad assembly constituency defeating Mannan Malick of the Indian National Congress in 2014. Pashupati Nath Singh of BJP defeated Mannan Mallik of Congress in 2005, Prasadi Sao of RJD in 2000, and Ramadhar Yadav of JD in 1995. Surendra Prasad Roy of Congress defeated S.K. Shriva of JD in 1990 and Ram Chander Singh of Janata Party in 1985. Yogeshwar Prasad Yogesh of Congress defeated Gopi Kant Bakshi of CPI(M) in 1980 and Kalawati Devi of Janata Party.

Dhanbad assembly constituency is part of Dhanbad (Lok Sabha constituency).

=== Members of Parliament for Dhanbad ===
Election	Member	Party
1991	Rita Verma	Bharatiya Janata Party
1996	Rita Verma	Bharatiya Janata Party
1998	Rita Verma	Bharatiya Janata Party
1999	Rita Verma	Bharatiya Janata Party
2004	Chandra Shekhar Dubey	Indian National Congress
2009	Pashupati Nath Singh	Bharatiya Janata Party
2014	Pashupati Nath Singh	Bharatiya Janata Party
2019	Pashupati Nath Singh	Bharatiya Janata Party
2024	Dhullu Mahto	Bharatiya Janata Party

== Transport ==
=== Rail ===
Dhanbad has a very good rail connectivity with the other major parts of the country such as Delhi, Mumbai, Patna, Kolkata, Bhagalpur, Munger, Gaya, Chennai, Ahmedabad, Hyderabad, Kochi, Indore, Bhopal, Gwalior, Durgapur, Asansol, Jabalpur, Jaipur, Visakhapatnam Jodhpur, Nagpur, Pune, Varanasi and Guwahati etc. Dhanbad railway division is the largest revenue generator in India.

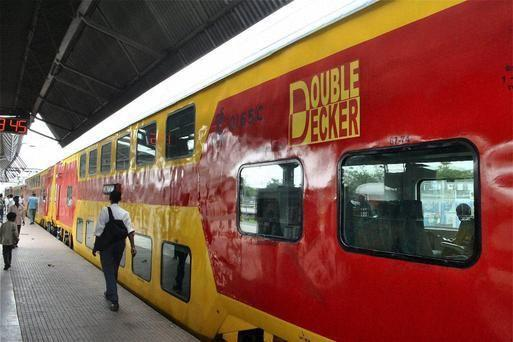
Double-decker train standing on the platform of Dhanbad railway station

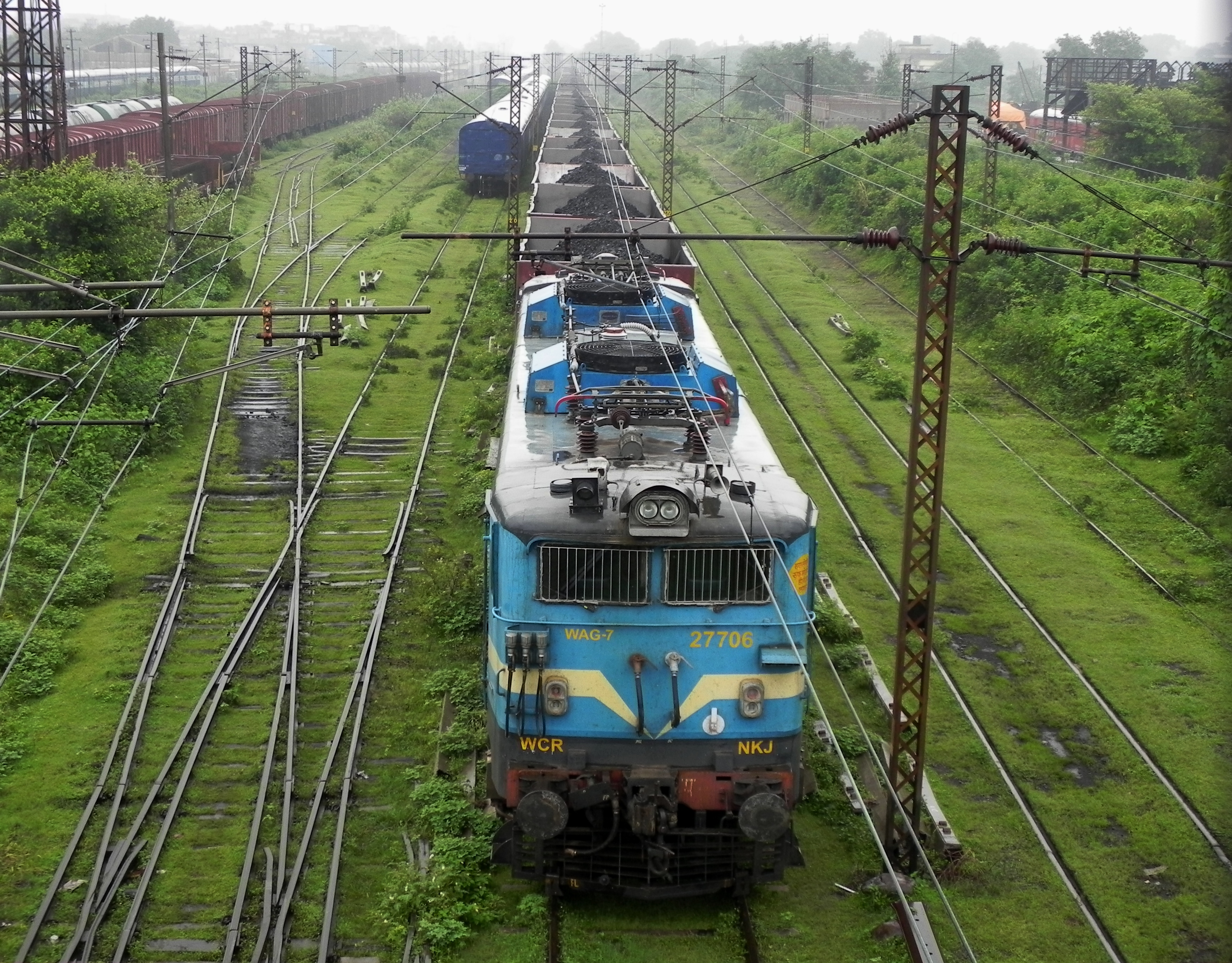
Coal Train in Dhanbad yard

Dhanbad Rail Division comes under East Central Railway zone. Grand Chord rail-line passes through Dhanbad junction, it connects Howrah and New Delhi. CIC rail line starts from Dhanbad and ends at Singrauli in Madhya Pradesh. There is one more rail line passing through the district, it starts at Kharagpur and ends at Gomoh, this rail line comes under South Eastern Railway. Dhanbad is connected with almost all states through rail network. Each and every train through this has a stop at Dhanbad. Even Sealdah Duronto has a stoppage at Dhanbad. Other important railway stations in Dhanbad city extremities are Bhaga Junction, Bhuli, Dokra Halt and Pradhankunta Junction.

On 1 October 2011, India's first AC double-decker train was flagged off to connect Howrah and Dhanbad. With this India joins the league of Europe and North America that run multi-deck trains. As of October 2011, the train runs daily except Sunday, departing from Howrah at 8:30 am to arrive at Dhanbad at 12:45 pm, and on return trip it departs Dhanbad at 6:30 pm to arrive at Howrah at 10:40 pm. It has a maximum permissible speed of 110 kilometres (68 mi)/hr with stops at Bardhaman, Durgapur, Asansol, Barakar and Kumardhubi on both legs of the route. This new AC design has several features namely stainless steel body, high-speed Eurofima design bogies with air springs and other safety-features.

=== Roads ===
National Highway 19 and National Highway 18 are the major highways passing through Dhanbad. NH 19 is part of Golden Quadrilateral (GQ) highway network; Dhanbad lies in Kolkata-Delhi link of the Golden Quadrilateral network. NH19 is being converted into six lane expressway; NH 18 connects Dhanbad to Bokaro-Jamshedpur.

National Highway 19 also emerges as a connector and transport system for various purpose connecting Delhi with Kolkata.

Private and State buses are available for inter-city traveling.

=== Air ===
Dhanbad Airport is used for private small aircraft and helicopters, currently there is no public air-link at the airport. The nearest public airports to Dhanbad are:

- Kazi Nazrul Islam Airport, Asansol-Durgapur 78 kilometres (48 mi)
- Deoghar Airport, Jharkhand 121 kilometres (75.18 mi)
- Birsa Munda Airport, Ranchi 153 kilometres (95 mi)
- Gaya Airport 213 kilometres (132 mi)
- Netaji Subhas Chandra Bose International Airport, Kolkata 272 kilometres (169 mi)
- Lok Nayak Jayaprakash Airport, Patna 326 kilometres (203 mi)

== Sports ==
Cricket is the most popular sport in Dhanbad, followed by Football. Dhanbad is one of the centres where 34th National Games was organised. Cricket Stadiums at present are at Tata Steel Stadium Digwadih, Nehru Stadium Jealgora and Railway Stadium where Ranji Trophy matches are organised. Women's International Cricket were also played at Railway Stadium. Football matches of national level were played at Railway Stadium but now it is converted into Cricket Stadium by the Railway management. Dhanbad officially became the second town in the state to boast a cricket stadium with floodlights, with the inauguration of floodlights at Tata Digwadih Stadium.

== Notable people ==
- Bibhu Bhattacharya, Bengali film & TV actor
- P. C. Bose, freedom fighter, labour activist & politician
- Meiyang Chang, Bollywood film & TV actor
- Purushottam K. Chauhan - freedom fighter, labour activist & politician, coal miner
- Seth Khora Ramji Chawda, railway contractor, coal mines pioneer, banker and philanthropist
- Gautam Choudhury, Indian musician and amateur archivist
- Anurag Dikshit – businessman (ranked 207th-richest person in the world by Forbes in 2006)
- Satya Narayan Gourisaria, British company secretary, Gandhian and a former secretary of the India League
- Subodh Kumar Jaiswal, IPS officer, current CBI director
- Chetan Joshi, classical Indian flautist
- Shiv Khera, author and professional speaker
- Aklu Ram Mahto, Former finance minister of Bihar, India.
- Binod Bihari Mahato, politician, advocate, activist, founder of Shivaji Samaj and Jharkhand Mukti Morch
- Aseem Mishra, Indian cinematographer
- Shahbaz Nadeem, Indian cricketer
- Zeishan Quadri, Bollywood actor, film maker
- A. K. Roy, founder of Marxist Coordination Committee
- Meenakshi Seshadri, former Bollywood actress
- Deven Sharma, former global president of Standard & Poor's
- Ram Krishna Singh, reviewer, critic, contemporary poet and retired professor of IIT-D
- Raj Sinha, MLA Dhanbad
- D. D. Thacker, noted coal miner and philanthropist.
- Randhir Prasad Verma, IPS officer and recipient of Ashoka Chakra
