= Jharia =

- Neighbourhood in Dhanbad
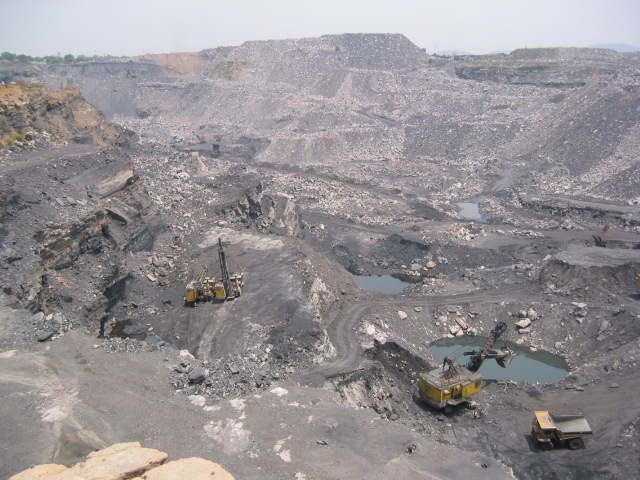
- Jharia coalfield

- Location in Jharkhand, India Jharia (India)
- Coordinates: 23.751568°N 86.420345°E
- Country: India
- State: Jharkhand
- District: Dhanbad
- Elevation: 77 m (253 ft)

Population (2001)
  - Total: 81,979

Languages
  - Official: Hindi, Urdu
- Time zone: UTC+5:30 (IST)
- PIN: 828111
- Vehicle registration: JH
- Website: dhanbad.nic.in

Jharia is a neighbourhood in Dhanbad city in Dhanbad Sadar subdivision of Dhanbad district in Jharkhand state, India. Jharia's economy is heavily dependent on the local coal fields, used to make coke. However, fires in the coal fields have made the city heavily polluted, with several government studies recommending relocation of much of the population to nearby Belgaria.

As of 2011, Jharia was the fifteenth-largest town in the state of Jharkhand.

== Geography ==
Cities, towns and locations in the central portion of Dhanbad Sadar subdivision in Dhanbad district
MC: Municipal Corporation, CT: Census Town, N: Neighbourhood, R: Rural/ Urban centre
Owing to space constraints in the small map, the actual locations in a larger map may vary slightly

=== Location ===
Jharia is located at 23.751568°N 86.420345°E.

Note: The map alongside presents some of the notable locations in the area. All places marked in the map are linked in the larger full screen map.

Jharia, earlier a census town, was combined with other urban units to form Dhanbad Municipal Corporation in 2006.

Jharia is spread over parts of Ward Nos. 36,37 and 38 of Dhanbad Municipal Corporation.

=== Overview ===
The region shown in the map is a part of the undulating uplands bustling with coalmines in the lowest rung of the Chota Nagpur Plateau. The entire area shown in the map is under Dhanbad Municipal Corporation, except Belgaria which is under Baliapur (community development block). The places in the DMC area are marked as neighbourhoods. The DMC area shown in the map is around the core area of Dhanbad city. Another major area of DMC is shown in the map of the southern portion of the district. A small stretch of DMC, extending up to Katras is shown in the map of the western portion. The region is fully urbanised. Jharia (community development block) has been merged into DMC. Three operational areas of BCCL operate fully within the region – Sijua Area, Kusunda Area and Bastacola Area.

=== Police station ===
There is a police station at Jharia.

== Demographics ==
As of 2001 India census, Jharia had a population of 81,979. Males constitute 54% of the population and females 46%. Jharia has an average literacy rate of 68%, lower than the national average of 74.5%: male literacy is 74%, and female literacy is 60%. In Jharia, 14% of the population is under 6 years of age.

== Relocation ==
According to the state government this is the worst site of India, the town of Jharia is to be shifted due to the uncontrollable coal mine fires (see below), which have found to be undousable, leading to loss of property and lives. Coal worth Rs. 60,000 crore (US$12 billion) is lying unmined, and the state government feels the shifting will help in exploiting this resource. The Jharia Rehabilitation and Development Authority is supposed to relocate much of the population to Belgaria and other towns nearby. However, as of 2017, the organization was facing considerable challenges in acquiring land and doing construction, and a 2016 book reporting on the relocation effort, found that the relocation was not accounting for Just Transition of jobs, or adequate high quality housing.

== Coal field ==
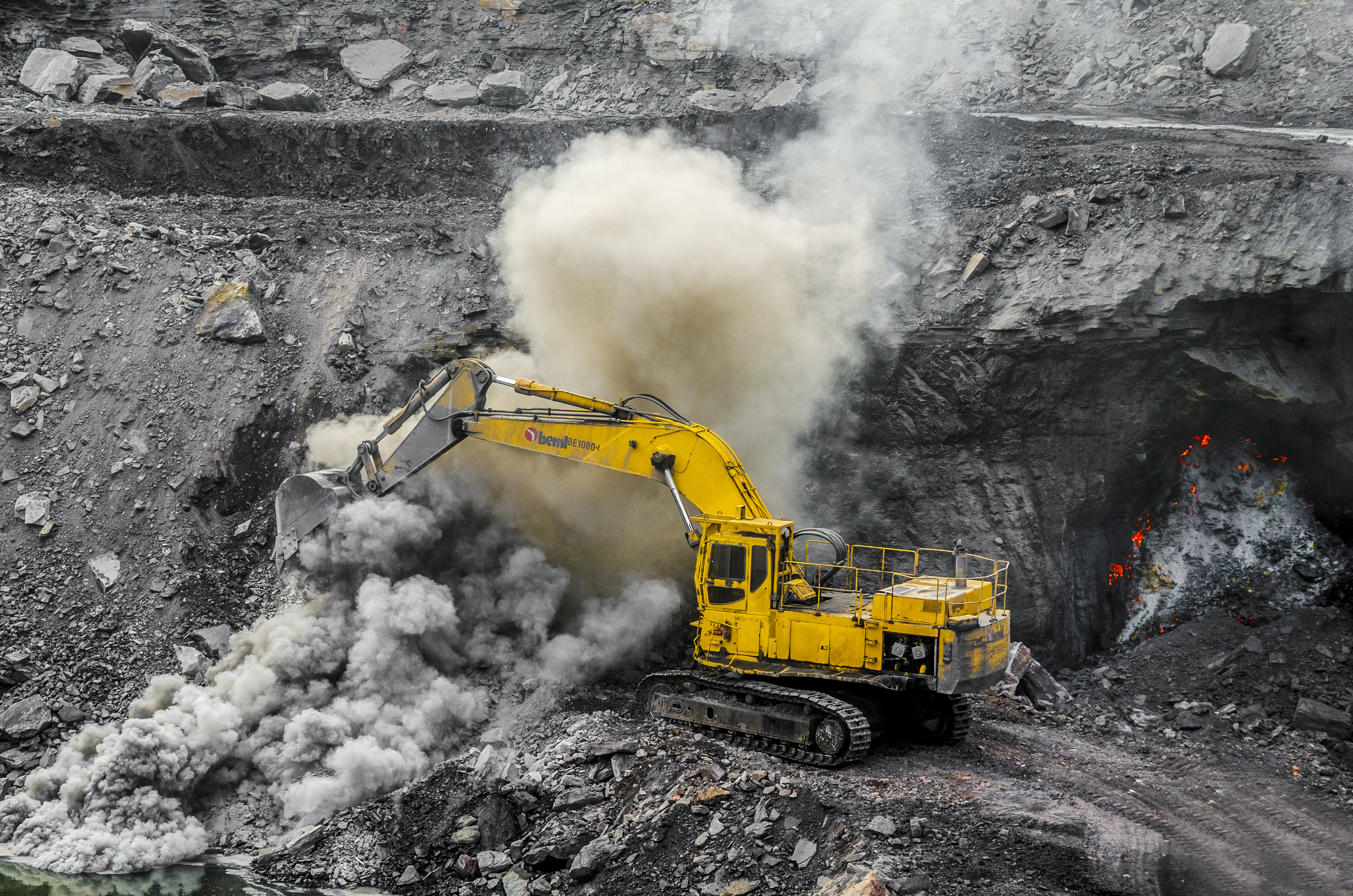
Jharia Coal mine

The coal field lies in the Damodar River Valley, and covers about 110 square miles (280 square km), and produces bituminous coal suitable for coke. Most of India's coal comes from Jharia. Jharia coal mines are India's most important storehouse of prime coke coal used in blast furnaces, it consists of 23 large underground and nine large open cast mines.

=== Coal field fire ===
Jharia is famous for a coal field fire that has burned underground for a century. The first fire was detected in 1916 at Bhowrah colliery owned by Eastern Coal Co Limited. According to records, it was the Khas Jharia mines of Seth Khora Ramji, who was a pioneer of Indian coalmines, whose mines were one of the first major mines to collapse in underground fire in 1930. Two of his collieries, Khas Jharia and Golden Jharia, which worked on maximum 260-foot-deep shafts, collapsed due to now infamous underground fires, in which their house and bungalow also collapsed on 8 November 1930, causing a six meter subsidence and widespread destruction. The fire never stopped despite sincere efforts by mines department and railway authorities and in 1933 flaming crevasses lead to exodus of many residents. The 1934 Nepal–Bihar earthquake led to further spread of fire and by 1938 the authorities had declared that there is raging fire beneath the town with 42 collieries out of 133 on fire.

In 1972, more than 70 mine fires were reported in this region. As of 2007, more than 400,000 people who reside in Jharia are living on land in danger of subsidence due to the fires, and according to Satya Pratap Singh, "Jharia township is on the brink of an ecological and human disaster". The government has been criticized for a perceived lackadaisical attitude towards the safety of the people of Jharia. Heavy fumes emitted by the fires lead to severe health problems such as breathing disorders and skin diseases among the local population.

== Education ==
- Raja Shiva Prasad College was established in 1951 at Bhagatdih, Jharia. It was shifted to Belgarhia, 5 km away, in 2018, because of an underground mine fire.

== Ammonia pollution ==
In 2018, researchers at Université Libre de Bruxelles (ULB) in Belgium revealed a created map of global atmospheric ammonia, by combining nine years of satellite data, that show Jharia and surroundings are heavily ammonia polluted from burning coal mines. The emitted ammonia reacts rapidly with other air pollutants, and thereby helps to form fine particulate matter that shortens the human lifespan through respiratory and coronary diseases. Moreover, the gaseous ammonia and ammonium compounds formed from it in the atmosphere, are deposited into ecosystems, throughout the Himalayas, damaging sensitive habitats — especially those naturally adapted to need clean air.

== See also ==
- Jharia Raj
