= Gunghasa =

- Census Town
- Location in Jharkhand, India Gunghasa (India)
- Coordinates: 23.8635°N 86.1687°E
- Country: India
- State: Jharkhand
- District: Dhanbad

Area
  - Total: 5.05 km^{2} (1.95 sq mi)

Population (2011)
  - Total: 6,845
  - Density: 1,360/km^{2} (3,510/sq mi)

Languages
  - Official: Hindi, Urdu
- Time zone: UTC+5:30 (IST)
- Telephone/ STD code: 0326
- Lok Sabha constituency: Giridih
- Vidhan Sabha constituency: Tundi
- Website: dhanbad.nic.in

Gunghasa is a census town in Topchanchi CD block in Dhanbad Sadar subdivision of Dhanbad district in the Indian state of Jharkhand.

== Geography ==
Cities, towns and locations in the northern portion of Dhanbad Sadar subdivision in Dhanbad district
MC: Municipal Corporation, CT: Census Town, N: Neighbourhood, R: Rural/ Urban centre
Owing to space constraints in the small map, the actual locations in a larger map may vary slightly

=== Location ===
Gunghasa is located at 23.8635°N 86.1687°E.

Note: The map alongside presents some of the notable locations in the area. All places marked in the map are linked in the larger full screen map.

=== Overview ===
The region shown in the map lies to the north of Dhanbad city and is an extensive rural area with villages (particularly in the northern areas) scattered around hills. One of the many spurs of Pareshnath Hill (1,365.50 m), situated in neighbouring Giridih district, passes through the Topchanchi and Tundi areas of the district. The Barakar River flows along the northern boundary. The region shown in the map covers several CD blocks – Topchanchi, Govindpur, Tundi, Purbi Tundi and a small part of Baghmara. The Kolkata-Agra National Highway 19 (old number NH 2)/ Grand Trunk Road cuts across the southern part of the region.

== Demographics ==
As per the 2011 Census of India, Gunghasa had a total population of 6,845 of which 3,631 (53%) were males and 3214 (47%) were females. Population below 6 years was 1,009. The total number of literates in Gunghasa was 4,435 (75.99% of the population over 6 years).

== Infrastructure ==
Gunghasa has an area of 5.05 km^{2}. It is 40 km from the district headquarters Dhanbad. The nearest railway station is at Gomoh 2 km away. Buses are available in the town. It has 12 km roads and open drains. The two major sources of protected water supply are hand pumps and uncovered wells. There are 1,199 domestic electric connections. Amongst the medical facilities it has 3 medicine shops. Amongst the educational facilities, it has 7 primary schools, 3 middle schools and 2 secondary schools. The nearest senior secondary school and general degree college are available at Gomoh. Amongst the recreational and cultural facilities, it had 1 cinema theatre which is converted into ITI Institute (Sai ITI). It has the branch office of 1 cooperative bank.

== Transport ==
It is on the Topchanchi-Gomoh-Phuwaritanr Road.
