= Topchanchi =

- Census Town
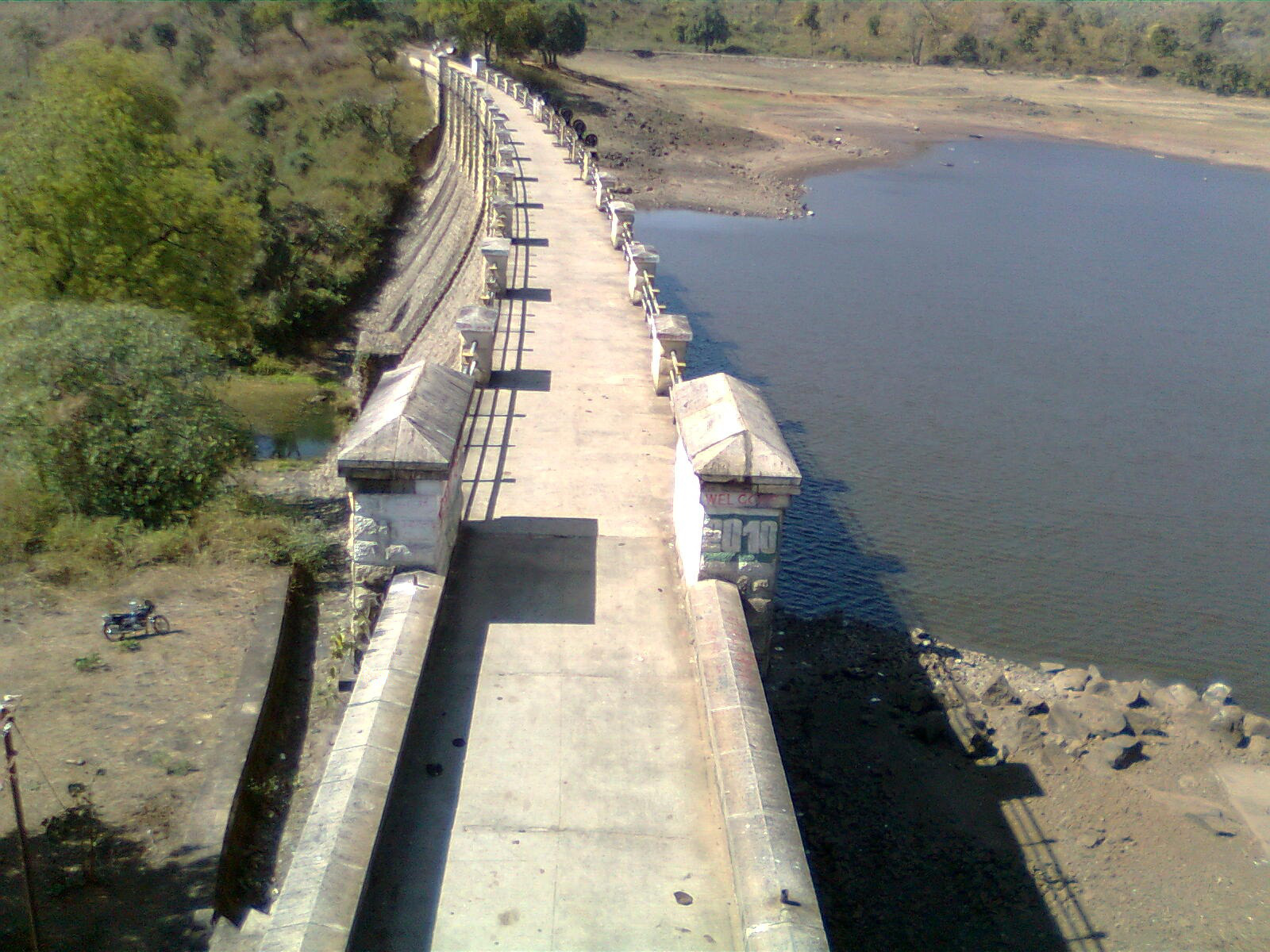
- Topchanchi lake

- Location in Jharkhand, India Topchanchi (India)
- Coordinates: 23.9°N 86.2°E
- Country: India
- State: Jharkhand
- District: Dhanbad
- CD block: Topchanchi

Area
  - Total: 3.29 km^{2} (1.27 sq mi)
- Elevation: 304 m (997 ft)

Population (2011)
  - Total: 6,082
  - Density: 1,850/km^{2} (4,790/sq mi)

Languages
  - Official: Hindi, Urdu
- Time zone: UTC+5:30 (IST)
- PIN: 828402
- Vehicle registration: JH
- Lok Sabha constituency: Giridih
- Vidhan Sabha constituency: Tundi
- Website: dhanbad.nic.in

Topchanchi is a census town in Topchanchi CD block in Dhanbad Sadar subdivision of Dhanbad district in the Indian state of Jharkhand.

== Geography ==
Cities, towns and locations in the northern portion of Dhanbad Sadar subdivision in Dhanbad district
MC: Municipal Corporation, CT: Census Town, N: Neighbourhood, R: Rural/ Urban centre
Owing to space constraints in the small map, the actual locations in a larger map may vary slightly

=== Location ===
Topchanchi is located at 23.9°N 86.2°E. It has an average elevation of 304 metres (997 feet).

Note: The map alongside presents some of the notable locations in the area. All places marked in the map are linked in the larger full screen map.

=== Overview ===
The region shown in the map lies to the north of Dhanbad city and is an extensive rural area with villages (particularly in the northern areas) scattered around hills. One of the many spurs of Pareshnath Hill (1,365.50 m), situated in neighbouring Giridih district, passes through the Topchanchi and Tundi areas of the district. The Barakar River flows along the northern boundary. The region shown in the map covers several CD blocks – Topchanchi, Govindpur, Tundi, Purbi Tundi and a small part of Baghmara. The Kolkata-Agra National Highway 19 (old number NH 2)/ Grand Trunk Road cuts across the southern part of the region.

=== Dam and reservoir ===
At Topchanchi a stream has been dammed by Jharia water Board at Rajdhato to form a big reservoir from where water is supplied to Dhanbad and its suburbs. This reservoir is famous as Topchanchi lake attracting thousands of tourists around the year. The Topchanchi Water Reservoir spreads over an area of 214 Ac. The Topchanchi Wildlife Sanctuary covers a sprawling plot that measures approximately 8.75 square kilometers. Although the Topchanchi Wildlife Sanctuary is not that spacious yet it manages to preserve the essence of the wild beasts that reside in it. Grand truck road passes through the middle of topchanchi. You can catch a glimpse of the Parasnath hill from Topchanchi.

=== Police station ===
Topchanchi police station serves Topchanchi CD block.

=== CD block HQ ===
Headquarters of Topchanchi CD block is at Topchanchi.

== Demographics ==
As per the 2011 Census of India, Topchanchi had a total population of 6,082 of which 3,109 (51%) were males and 2,973 (49%) were females. Population below 6 years was 830. The total number of literates in Topchanchi was 4,095 (77.97% of the population over 6 years).

As of 2001 India census, Topchanchi had a population of 5,397. Males constitute 53% of the population and females 47%. Topchanchi has an average literacy rate of 57%, lower than the national average of 59.5%: male literacy is 69%, and female literacy is 43%. In Topchanchi, 15% of the population is under 6 years of age.

== Infrastructure ==
Topchanchi has an area of 3.29 km^{2}. It is 35 km from the district headquarters Dhanbad. The nearest railway station is at Gomoh 12 km away. Buses are available in the town. It has 5 km roads and open drains. The two major sources of protected water supply are hand pumps and tap water from treated source. There are 914 domestic electric connections and 152 road lighting points. Amongst the medical facilities it has 1 hospital with 6 beds. Amongst the educational facilities, it has 2 primary schools, 15 middle schools, 1 secondary school and 1 senior secondary school. The general degree college is available at Gomoh. Amongst the recreational and cultural facilities, the nearest cinema theatre is available at Gomoh There is 1 auditorium/ community hall. It has the branch offices of 6 nationalised banks, 1 cooperative bank and 1 agricultural credit society.

== Transport ==
Topchanchi is on National Highway 19 (old numbering NH 2)/ Grand Trunk Road. A short stretch of local road links it to Gomoh.

== Education ==
St. Thomas High School was established at Topchanchi in 1997. It is a senior secondary school affiliated to the CBSE. It is a residential school. The foremost and the best school in the district of Dhanbad.

== Topchanchi picture gallery ==
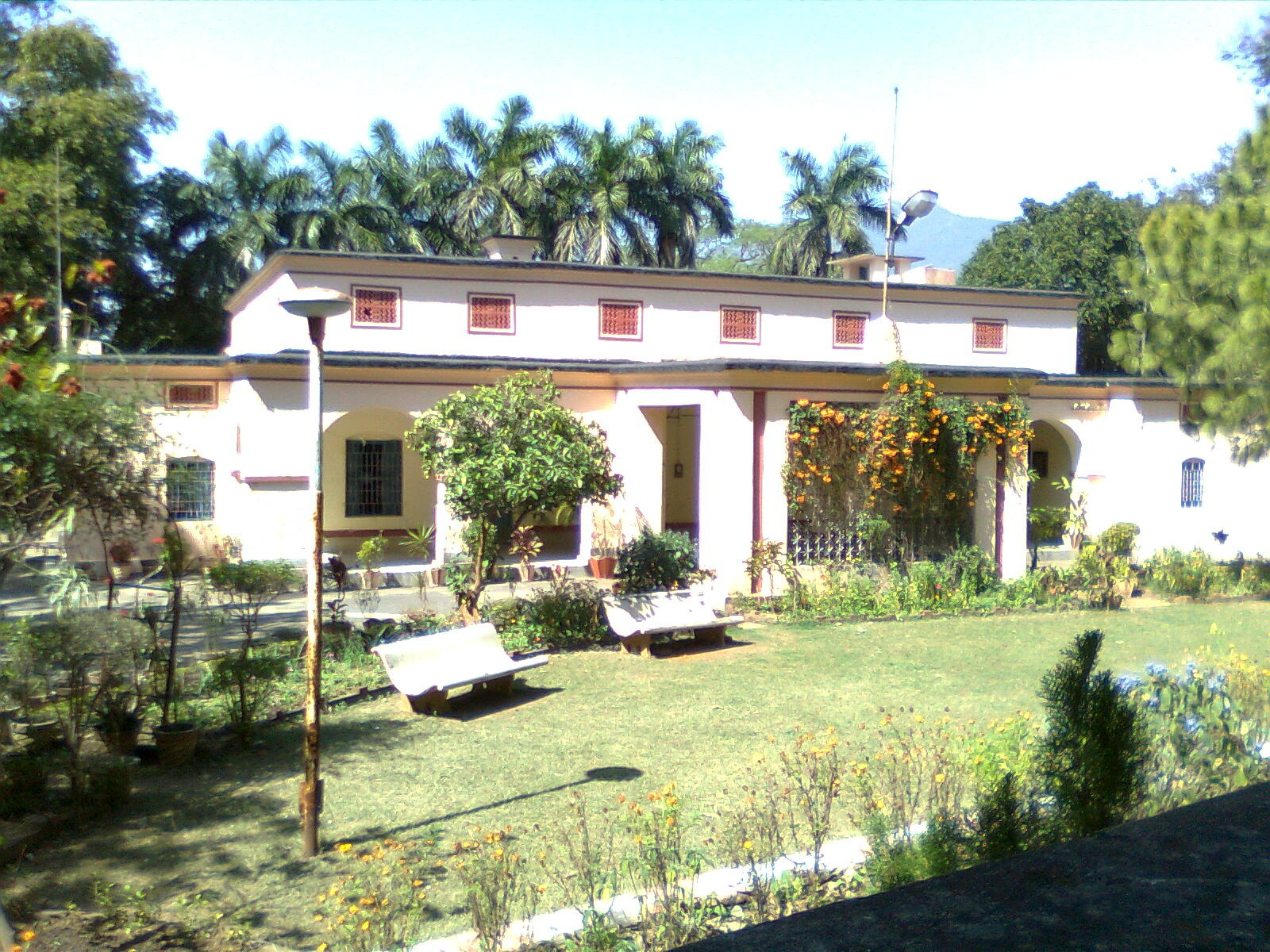
Bawan kothi tirpan dham

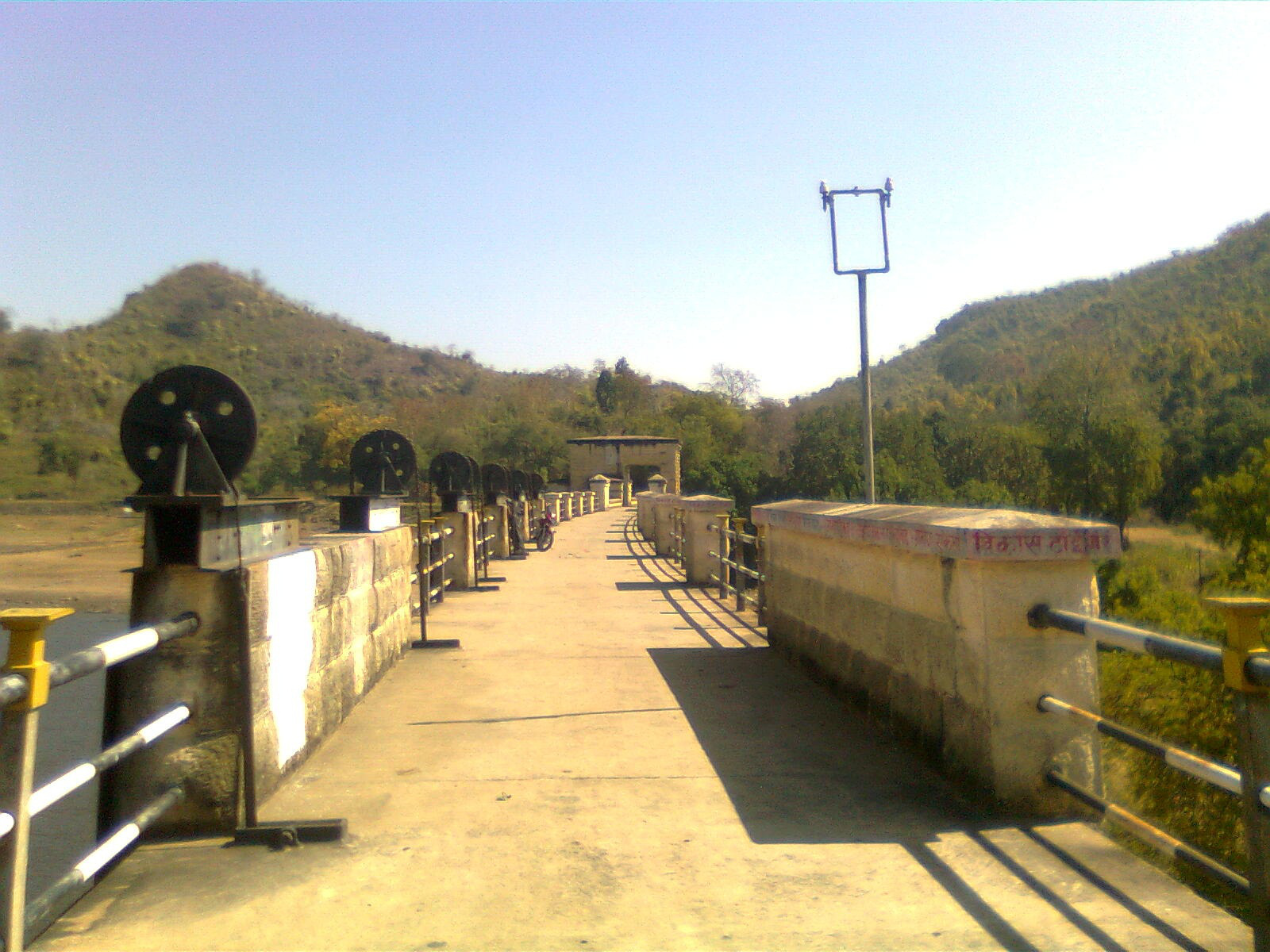
Topchanchi Lake

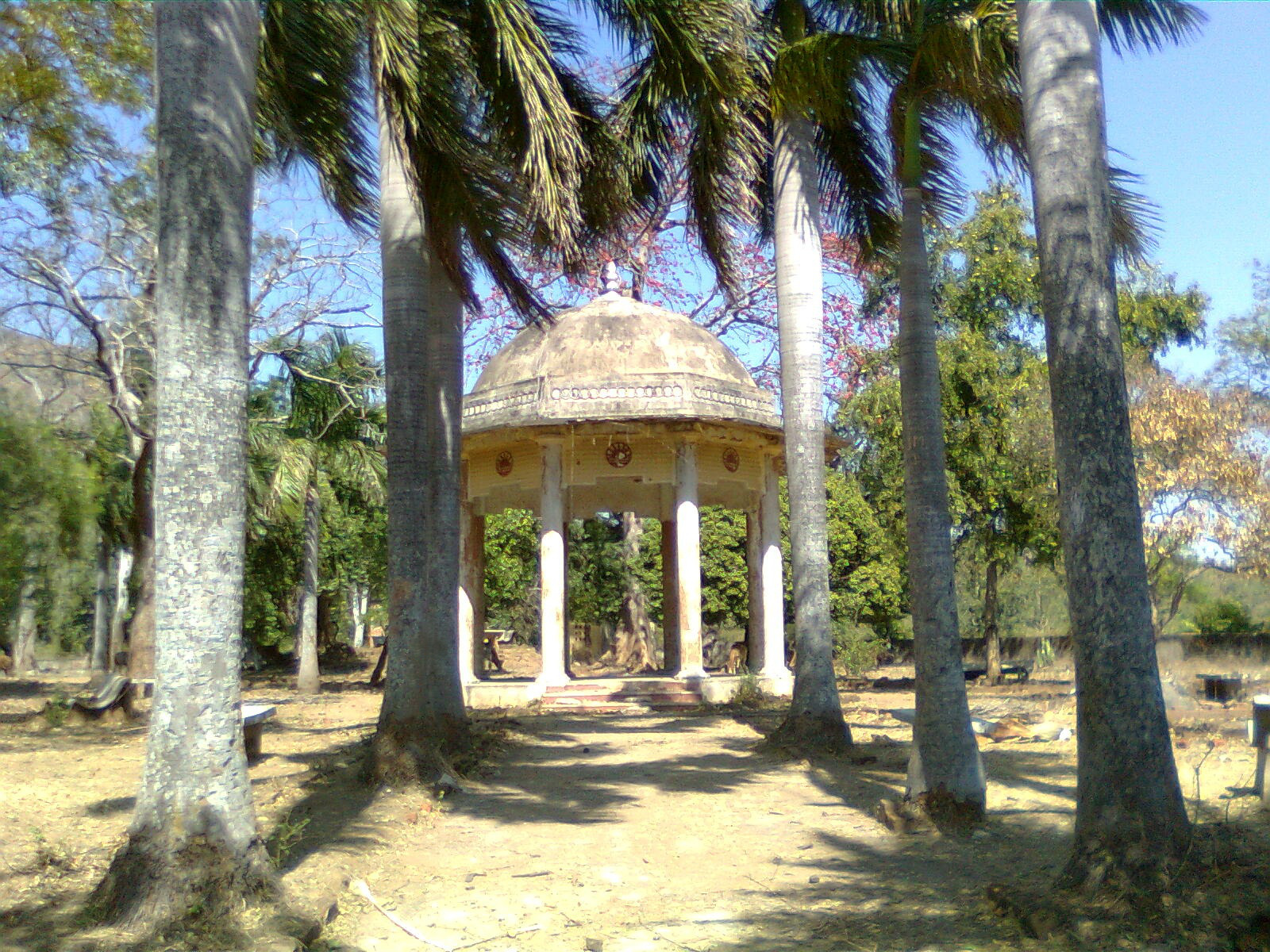
Topchanchi Park
