= Karmatanr, Dhanbad =

Karmatanr
- Census Town
- Location in Jharkhand, India Karmatanr (India)
- Coordinates: 23.783611°N 86.48131°E
- Country: India
- State: Jharkhand
- District: Dhanbad

Area
  - Total: 1.6 km^{2} (0.62 sq mi)

Population (2011)
  - Total: 6,393
  - Density: 4,000/km^{2} (10,000/sq mi)

Languages
  - Official: Hindi, Urdu
- Time zone: UTC+5:30 (IST)
- Lok Sabha constituency: Dhanbad
- Vidhan Sabha constituency: Sindri
- Website: dhanbad.nic.in

Karmatanr is a census town in Govindpur CD block in Dhanbad Sadar subdivision of Dhanbad district in the Indian state of Jharkhand.

== Geography ==
Cities, towns and locations in the northern portion of Dhanbad Sadar subdivision in Dhanbad district
MC: Municipal Corporation, CT: Census Town, N: Neighbourhood, R: Rural/ Urban centre
Owing to space constraints in the small map, the actual locations in a larger map may vary slightly

=== Location ===
Karmatanr is located at 23.783611°N 86.48131°E.

Note: The map alongside presents some of the notable locations in the area. All places marked in the map are linked in the larger full screen map.

=== Overview ===
The region shown in the map lies to the north of Dhanbad city and is an extensive rural area with villages (particularly in the northern areas) scattered around hills. One of the many spurs of Pareshnath Hill (1,365.50 m), situated in neighbouring Giridih district, passes through the Topchanchi and Tundi areas of the district. The Barakar River flows along the northern boundary. The region shown in the map covers several CD blocks – Topchanchi, Govindpur, Tundi, Purbi Tundi and a small part of Baghmara. The Kolkata-Agra National Highway 19 (old number NH 2)/ Grand Trunk Road cuts across the southern part of the region.

== Demographics ==
As per the 2011 Census of India, Karmatanr had a total population of 6,393 of which 3,391 (53%) were males and 3,001 (47%) were females. Population below 6 years was 947. The total number of literates in Karmatanr was 4,190 (76.94% of the population over 6 years).

== Infrastructure ==
Karmatanr has an area of 1.6 km^{2}. It is 10 km from the district headquarters Dhanbad. There is a railway station at Dhanbad. Buses are available at Gobindpur 1 km away. It has 3 km roads and open drains. The two major sources of protected water supply are uncovered wells and hand pumps. There are 992 domestic electric connections. Amongst the medical facilities it has got 2 medicine shops. Amongst the educational facilities, it has 2 primary schools and 2 middle schools. There are secondary school, senior secondary school and general degree college at Gobindpur.
