= Tundi =

- Village
- Location in Jharkhand, India Tundi (India)
- Coordinates: 23.988689°N 86.451667°E
- Country: India
- State: Jharkhand
- District: Dhanbad

Population (2011)
  - Total: 4,221

Languages
  - Official: Hindi, Urdu
- Time zone: UTC+5:30 (IST)
- PIN: 828142
- Telephone/ STD code: 06540
- Website: dhanbad.nic.in

Tundi is a village in Tundi CD block in Dhanbad Sadar subdivision of Dhanbad district in the Indian state of Jharkhand.

== Geography ==
Cities, towns and locations in the northern portion of Dhanbad Sadar subdivision in Dhanbad district
MC: Municipal Corporation, CT: Census Town, N: Neighbourhood, R: Rural/ Urban centre
Owing to space constraints in the small map, the actual locations in a larger map may vary slightly

=== Location ===
Tundi is located at 23.988689°N 86.451667°E.

Note: The map alongside presents some of the notable locations in the area. All places marked in the map are linked in the larger full screen map.

=== Overview ===
The region shown in the map lies to the north of Dhanbad city and is an extensive rural area with villages (particularly in the northern areas) scattered around hills. It is also an assembly area of Jharkhand. One of the many spurs of Pareshnath Hill (1,365.50 m), situated in neighbouring Giridih district, passes through the Topchanchi and Tundi areas of the district. The Barakar River flows along the northern boundary. The region shown in the map covers several CD blocks – Topchanchi, Govindpur, Tundi, Purbi Tundi and a small part of Baghmara. The Kolkata-Agra National Highway 19 (old number NH 2)/ Grand Trunk Road cuts across the southern part of the region.

=== Police station ===
Tundi police station serves Tundi CD Block.

=== CD block HQ ===
Headquarters of this CD block is at Tundi.

== Demographics ==
As per the 2011 Census of India, Tundi had a total population of 4,221 of which 2,067 (49%) were males and 2,154 (51%) were females. Population below 6 years was 610. The total number of literates in Tundi was 2,761 (76.46% of the population over 6 years).

== Transport ==
State Highway 13 (Jharkhand) passes through Tundi. There is a bridge over the Barakar nearby, crossing over to Taratanr in Giridih district.

== Education ==
High School, Tundi, was established in 1952. It is a coeducational Hindi-medium institution with facilities for teaching from Class IX to Class XII. It is affiliated to the state board.

Model School, Tundi, was established in 2011. It is a co-educational English-medium institution with facilities for teaching from Class VI to Class X. It is affiliated to the state board. The school was established following a decision of the state government to open model schools with state-of-art infrastructure in each of the 212 blocks of Jharkhnd.
