= Barwaada =

- Inhabited place
- Location in Jharkhand, India Barwaada (India)
- Coordinates: 23.8457°N 86.4274°E
- Country: India
- State: Jharkhand
- District: Dhanbad

Languages
  - Official: Hindi, Urdu
- Time zone: UTC+5:30 (IST)
- Website: dhanbad.nic.in

Barwadda is an inhabited place in Govindpur CD block in Dhanbad Sadar subdivision of Dhanbad district in the Indian state of Jharkhand.

== Geography ==
Cities, towns and locations in the northern portion of Dhanbad Sadar subdivision in Dhanbad district
MC: Municipal Corporation, CT: Census Town, N: Neighbourhood, R: Rural/ Urban centre
Owing to space constraints in the small map, the actual locations in a larger map may vary slightly

=== Location ===
Barwaada is located at 23.8457°N 86.4274°E.

Barwaada has not been identified as a separate place in 2011 census. As per map of Govindpur CD Block on page 121 in District Census Handbook, Dhanbad it appears to be a part of Damkarabarwa mouza.

Dhanbad Airport is located in Barwaada.

Note: The map alongside presents some of the notable locations in the area. All places marked in the map are linked in the larger full screen map.

=== Overview ===
The region shown in the map lies to the north of Dhanbad city and is an extensive rural area with villages (particularly in the northern areas) scattered around hills. One of the many spurs of Pareshnath Hill (1,365.50 m), situated in neighbouring Giridih district, passes through the Topchanchi and Tundi areas of the district. The Barakar River flows along the northern boundary. The region shown in the map covers several CD blocks – Topchanchi, Govindpur, Tundi, Purbi Tundi and a small part of Baghmara. The Kolkata-Agra National Highway 19 (old number NH 2)/ Grand Trunk Road cuts across the southern part of the region.

=== Police station ===
There is a police station at Barwaada.

== Transport ==
Barwaada Bypass Road links Barwaada to National Highway 19 (old number NH 2)/ Grand Trunk Road.
