= Latani, Dhanbad =

Latani
- Village
- Location in Jharkhand, India Latani (India)
- Coordinates: 23.889194°N 86.587611°E
- Country: India
- State: Jharkhand
- District: Dhanbad

Population (2011)
  - Total: 1,762

Languages
  - Official: Hindi, Urdu
- Time zone: UTC+5:30 (IST)
- Website: dhanbad.nic.in

This page is about a village in Jharkhand, India. Latani redirects to Cleverman, an Australian television drama program

Latani is a village in Purbi Tundi CD block in Dhanbad Sadar subdivision of Dhanbad district in the Indian state of Jharkhand.

== Geography ==
Cities, towns and locations in the northern portion of Dhanbad Sadar subdivision in Dhanbad district
MC: Municipal Corporation, CT: Census Town, N: Neighbourhood, R: Rural/ Urban centre
Owing to space constraints in the small map, the actual locations in a larger map may vary slightly

=== Location ===
Latani is located at 23.889194°N 86.587611°E.

Note: The map alongside presents some of the notable locations in the area. All places marked in the map are linked in the larger full screen map.

=== Overview ===
The region shown in the map lies to the north of Dhanbad city and is an extensive rural area with villages (particularly in the northern areas) scattered around hills. One of the many spurs of Pareshnath Hill (1,365.50 m), situated in neighbouring Giridih district, passes through the Topchanchi and Tundi areas of the district. The Barakar River flows along the northern boundary. The region shown in the map covers several CD blocks – Topchanchi, Govindpur, Tundi, Purbi Tundi and a small part of Baghmara. The Kolkata-Agra National Highway 19 (old number NH 2)/ Grand Trunk Road cuts across the southern part of the region.

=== Police station ===
Purvi Tundi police station serves Purbi Tundi CD Block.

=== CD block HQ ===
Headquarters of Purbi Tundi CD block is at Latani.

== Demographics ==
As per the 2011 Census of India, Latani had a total population of 1,762 of which 883 (50%) were males and 879 (50%) were females. Population below 6 years was 243. The total number of literates in Latani was 1,039 (68.40% of the population over 6 years).

== Transport ==
Latani is on the Dhanbad-Jamtara Road.

== Education ==
Middle School, Latani was established in 1939. It is a Hindi-medium co-educational school with arrangements for teaching from Class I to Class VIII.
