= Gomoh =

- Census Town
- Location in Jharkhand, India Gomoh (India)
- Coordinates: 23.87°N 86.17°E
- Country: India
- State: Jharkhand
- District: Dhanbad
- CD block: Topchanchi

Area
  - Total: 8.96 km^{2} (3.46 sq mi)
- Elevation: 245 m (804 ft)

Population (2011)
  - Total: 31,495
  - Density: 3,520/km^{2} (9,100/sq mi)

Languages
  - Official: Hindi, Urdu
- Time zone: UTC+5:30 (IST)
- PIN: 828401
- Telephone code: 0326
- Vehicle registration: JH-10
- Lok Sabha constituency: Giridih
- Vidhan Sabha constituency: Tundi

Gomoh (better known as Netaji Subhash Chandra Bose Junction Gomoh) is a census town in Topchanchi CD Block Dhanbad Sadar subdivision of Dhanbad district in the Indian state of Jharkhand. It has a major railway junction, which was renamed Netaji Subhas Chandra Bose Gomoh railway station on 23 January 2009, that is situated on the Grand Chord Line under the Dhanbad division of the East Central Railway. Gomoh is the meeting point for trains coming from Howrah (Eastern Railway), Ranchi/Bokaro (South Eastern Railway) and Puri/Bhubaneswar (East Coast Railway).

== History and Culture ==
On his great escape from the British, Netaji Subhas Chandra Bose caught the 17 January 1941 Howrah-Kalka Mail, then known as the 63UP Howrah-Peshawar Express, from Gomoh. There is a statue of Netaji between platforms no. 1 & 2 at the Gomoh railway station reminding people of his historic visit. Every year on 23 January, the railway employees and the people of the town organize a small cultural program to celebrate Netaji's birthday.

Residents of Gomoh organize an annual week-long fair on the Railway Football Ground starting in 11 March in remembrance of the assassinated labour leader Sadanand Jha. There are two big playgrounds in Gomoh.

== Geography ==
Cities, towns and locations in the northern portion of Dhanbad Sadar subdivision in Dhanbad district
MC: Municipal Corporation, CT: Census Town, N: Neighbourhood, R: Rural/ Urban centre
Owing to space constraints in the small map, the actual locations in a larger map may vary slightly

=== Location ===
Gomoh is located at 23.87°N 86.17°E. It has an average elevation of 245 metres (803 feet). The town has an area of 8.96 km^{2}. It is 37 km from the district administrative headquarters in Dhanbad.

Note: The map alongside presents some of the notable locations in the area. All places marked in the map are linked in the larger full screen map.

Gomoh is a largely dust-free area (unlike its surroundings polluted by coal mining in the area) surrounded by hills.

=== Overview ===
The region containing Gomoh shown in the map lies to the north of Dhanbad city and is an extensive rural area with villages (particularly in the northern areas) scattered around hills. One of the many spurs of Pareshnath Hill (1,365.50 m), situated in neighbouring Giridih district, passes through the Topchanchi and Tundi areas of the district. The Barakar River flows along the northern boundary. The region shown in the map covers several CD blocks – Topchanchi, Govindpur, Tundi, Purbi Tundi and a small part of Baghmara. The Kolkata-Agra National Highway 19 (old number NH 2)/ Grand Trunk Road cuts across the southern part of the region.

== Demographics ==
As per the 2011 Census of India, Gomoh had a total population of 31,495, of which 16,443 (52%) were males and 15,052 (48%) were females. 3,956 were below the age of 6. The total number of literates in Gomoh was 23,233 (84.36% of the population older than 6).

As of the 2001 India census, Gomoh had a population of 28,576. Males constituted 54% of the population and females 46%. Gomoh had an average literacy rate of 70%, higher than the national average of 59.5%. Male literacy was 78% and female literacy was 60%. In Gomoh, 14% of the population was under 6 years of age.

== Social composition ==
Gomoh consists of people from diverse religious and professional backgrounds. Netaji played a major role in the development of Gomoh. People living in Gomoh face both long term problems such as lack of education and more immediate issues such as lack of electricity.

Gomoh has a predominantly Hindu population, with a significant presence of followers belonging to the Vaishnav tradition of Vedic origin. A number of Christian Anglo-Indians have lived in the area since the British era. Sikh businesspeople settled in the town before India's independence. Every day, Sikhs from surrounding areas visit a gurudwara at the Loco Bazar. Bengalis form a large part of the population of Gomoh. However, the Bengali population has been dwindling for the last few decades. On Durga Puja one can get a glimpse of Kolkata from Gomoh, especially at Durga Para, which is home to the oldest Durge Puja in the area. Muslims also contribute substantially to the population and culture of the region. There is a masjid and a madarsa at Purana Bazar and a Jama Masjid at Loco Bazar. The Id-Gah and graveyard of Muslims is in Laludih area.

As Gomoh is a railway-based town, a majority of Gomohans are former railway employees (different grades). Railway workers do not belong to the city but are transferred from different parts of the country. After retirement, a good number of these employees choose to settle down in Gomoh, giving rise to the city's population. There is also a strong business class in Gomoh. Businesses ranging from food grain wholesaling to clothing and apparel to building material (cement, bricks, iron rods, etc.) to confectionery and bakery products etc. can be found in the city. Historical accounts and community records suggest that members of the Aggarwal and Baranwal clans of the Baniya community migrated to this region approximately 200 years ago in search of Business, Trading and Money Lending. Their migration is believed to have originated from the regions of Marwar (in present-day Rajasthan) and Awadh (in present-day western Uttar Pradesh).

The main festivals celebrated in Gomoh include Durga Puja (Dussehra), Dipawali, Holi, Chatth Puja, Id, Gurunanak's Birthday, and Christmas.

== Infrastructure ==
Gomoh has a railway station. Buses are available in the town. It has 50 km of roads and both open and closed drains. The two major sources of protected water are hand pumps and tap water from a treated source. There are 5,313 domestic electric connections and 60 road lighting points. It has 1 hospital with 30 beds and 12 pharmacies. It has 17 primary schools, 13 middle schools, 9 secondary schools, 1 senior secondary school and 1 general degree college. It also has 1 auditorium/ community hall. The town is home to the branch offices of 3 national banks, 1 cooperative bank and 1 agricultural credit society. But in current scenario there is no any waste management facility in the town, wastes are dumped in middle of the city, specially in Purana Bazar and burn them openly, which is harming the human health and making them sick everyday. No any action either from municipal corporation nor from the higher authority.

== Education ==
As Gomoh is a small town, only a few educational institutes up to the secondary level exist. They include the Kendriya Vidyalaya Gomoh, which is managed by the railways, and G M Public School, a school affiliated with CBSE. G.M. Public School also provides hostel facilities. The DeNobili school is the only school in Gomoh that follows ICSE curriculum.

Several schools, including Blossom Public School, Guru Nanak Public School, Holi Child, Sarswati Shishu Vidya Mandir, and the St. Mary's Day School, are registered through the Jharkhand Academic Council (RANCHI). These schools teach up to Standard 8 and follow CBSE curriculum. There high schools affiliated with Jharkhand Academic Council such as Azaad Hind High School, Bishop Rockey High School, and St. John de Brito High School. Girls High School is an all-female school in Gomoh.

Pandit Nehru Memorial College in Gomoh offers basic tertiary education. However, the college's facilities are not sufficient for students who are taking specialized courses in diversified fields. Advanced students from this area studying fields not covered by Pandit Nehru either depend on the facilities in Bokaro Steel City (33 km), the facilities in Dhanbad (30 km), or travel to a metro city. Pre-K education is offered through Nurture Kindergarten Play School in Jeetpur.

== Healthcare ==
Healthcare facilities in Gomoh are grossly inadequate.Not only that most of the ill patients either go to Dhanbad or Ranchi for better treatment. Gomoh lacks a qualified doctor as well as a nursing home. Although there are some government and private nursing homes, they fail to provide even the most basic treatment. The medical units operating in the area are:

1. PHC Gomoh at Jitpur
2. Railway Hospital (set up by railways for their employees, they also cater to non-railway patients unofficially)
3. A few other privately run small clinics
