= Gobindpur, Jharkhand =

Gobindpur
- Census Town
- Location in Jharkhand, India Gobindpur (India)
- Coordinates: 23°50′19″N 86°31′7″E
- Country: India
- State: Jharkhand
- District: Dhanbad
- CD block: Govindpur

Area
  - Total: 2.83 km^{2} (1.09 sq mi)
- Elevation: 188 m (617 ft)

Population (2011)
  - Total: 11,318
  - Density: 4,000/km^{2} (10,400/sq mi)

Languages
  - Official: Hindi, English, Bengali and Kudmali
- Time zone: UTC+5:30 (IST)
- PIN: 828109
- Telephone/STD code: 06540
- Vehicle registration: JH
- Website: dhanbad.nic.in

Gobindpur is a census town in Govindpur CD block in Dhanbad Sadar subdivision of Dhanbad district in the Indian state of Jharkhand. The town is named after Lord Venkateswara who is also known as Govinda/Gobinda.

== Geography ==
Cities, towns and locations in the northern portion of Dhanbad Sadar subdivision in Dhanbad district
MC: Municipal Corporation, CT: Census Town, N: Neighbourhood, R: Rural/ Urban centre
Owing to space constraints in the small map, the actual locations in a larger map may vary slightly

=== Location ===
Gobindpur is located at 23°50′19″N 86°31′7″E. It has an average elevation of 188 metres (616 feet).

The Dhangi Hills (highest peak 385.57 m) run from Pradhan Khunta to Gobindpur.

Note: The map alongside presents some of the notable locations in the area. All places marked in the map are linked in the larger full screen map.

=== Overview ===
The region shown in the map lies to the north of Dhanbad city and is an extensive rural area with villages (particularly in the northern areas) scattered around hills. One of the many spurs of Pareshnath Hill (1,365.50 m), situated in neighbouring Giridih district, passes through the Topchanchi and Tundi areas of the district. The Barakar River flows along the northern boundary. The region shown in the map covers several CD blocks – Topchanchi, Govindpur, Tundi, Purbi Tundi and a small part of Baghmara. The Kolkata-Agra National Highway 19 (old number NH 2)/ Grand Trunk Road cuts across the southern part of the region.

=== Police station ===
Gobindpur police station serves Govindpur CD Block.

=== CD block HQ ===
Headquarters of Govindpur CD block is at Gobindpur.

== History ==
Gobindpur was a mint town in the Mughal era. Copper coins were produced during the reigns of Akbar and Jahangir.

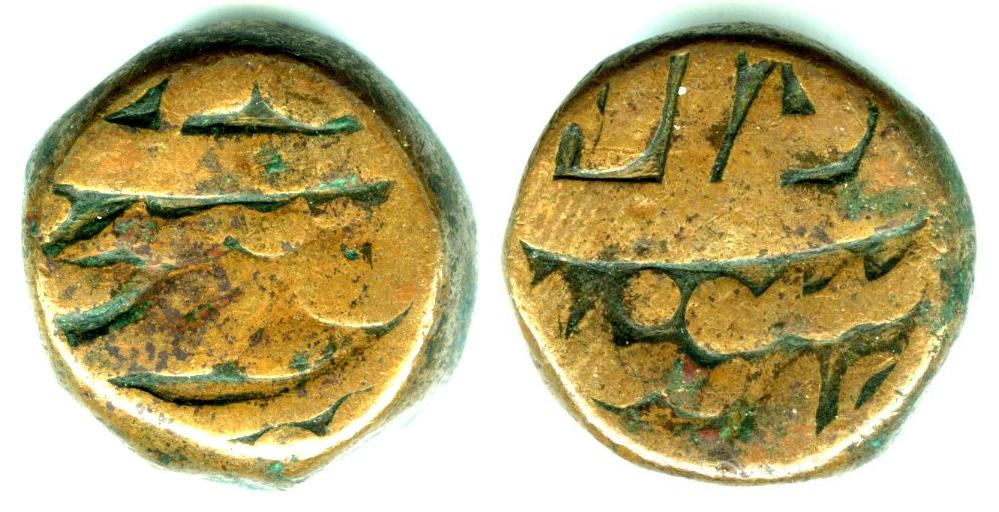
Copper coin from the time of Akbar. The obverse reads "Gobindp(ur)". c. 1600 CE.

== Demographics ==
As per the 2011 Census of India, Gobindpur had a total population of 11,318 of which 5,950 (53%) were males and 5,368 (47%) were females. Population below 6 years was 1,547. The total number of literates in Gobindpur was 8,014 (82.02% of the population over 6 years).

As of 2001 India census, Gobindpur had a population of 8,504. Males constitute 54% of the population and females 46%. Gobindpur has an average literacy rate of 65%, higher than the national average of 59.5%: male literacy is 73%, and female literacy is 55%. In Gobindpur, 15% of the population is under 6 years of age.

== Infrastructure ==
Gobindpur has an area of 2.83 km^{2}. It is 12 km from the district headquarters Dhanbad. There is a railway station at Dhanbad. Buses are available in the town. It has 7 km roads and both covered and open drains. The two major sources of protected water supply are hand pumps and uncovered wells. There are 1,760 domestic electric connections and 40 road lighting points. Amongst the medical facilities it has got a dispensary with 10 beds, a health centre with 10 beds and 15 medicine shops. Amongst the educational facilities, it has 2 primary schools, 2 middle schools, 2 secondary schools, 1 senior secondary school, 1 general degree college and 1 polytechnic. Amongst the recreational and cultural facilities, it has 2 cinema theatres and an auditorium/ community hall. It has the branch offices of 5 nationalised banks, 1 cooperative bank, 1 agricultural credit society and 1 non-agricultural credit society.

== Economy ==
The following collieries function under the Govindpur Area of BCCL: Kharkhari, Maheshpur, Jogidih, Kooridih, Govindpur, S/Govindpur, Teturiya and Akash Kinaree.

The Govindpur Area was formed with thirty-one collieries taken over from the private sector.

== Transport ==
It is the junction point of NH 19 (old number: NH 2) and NH 18 (old number: NH 32).

== Education ==
Ram Sahai More College, at Ratanpur, Gobindpur, established in 1959, is a Government college offering courses in arts, science and commerce. It is affiliated with the Binod Bihari Mahto Koylanchal University.

K.K.Polytechnic, at Nairo, Gobindpur, established in 2006, offers diploma courses in engineering. Al Iqra Teacher's Training College (AITTC) established in 2000 is located in Bario More, only 2.5 km away from Govindpur. It is a renowned and reputed college not only in Dhanbad but in Jharkhand also. NAC graded it B. It has been delivering its services for 20 years. The graduates of the college are serving in government and private sectors.
