= Mohubani =

- Village
- Madhubani
- Location in Jharkhand, India Mohubani (India)
- Coordinates: 23°42′57″N 86°31′27″E
- Country: India
- State: Jharkhand
- District: Dhanbad

Government
  - Type: Representative democracy
  - Body: Gram panchayat

Area
  - Total: 2.3 km^{2} (0.89 sq mi)
- Elevation: 196 m (643 ft)

Population (2011)
  - Total: 1,600
  - Density: 700/km^{2} (1,800/sq mi)

Languages
  - Official: Hindi, Kudmali

Literacy (2011)
- Time zone: UTC+5:30 (IST)
- PIN: 828201 (Baliapur)
- Telephone/STD code: 0326
- Vehicle registration: JH 10
- Lok Sabha constituency: Dhanbad
- Vidhan Sabha constituency: Sindri
- Website: dhanbad.nic.in

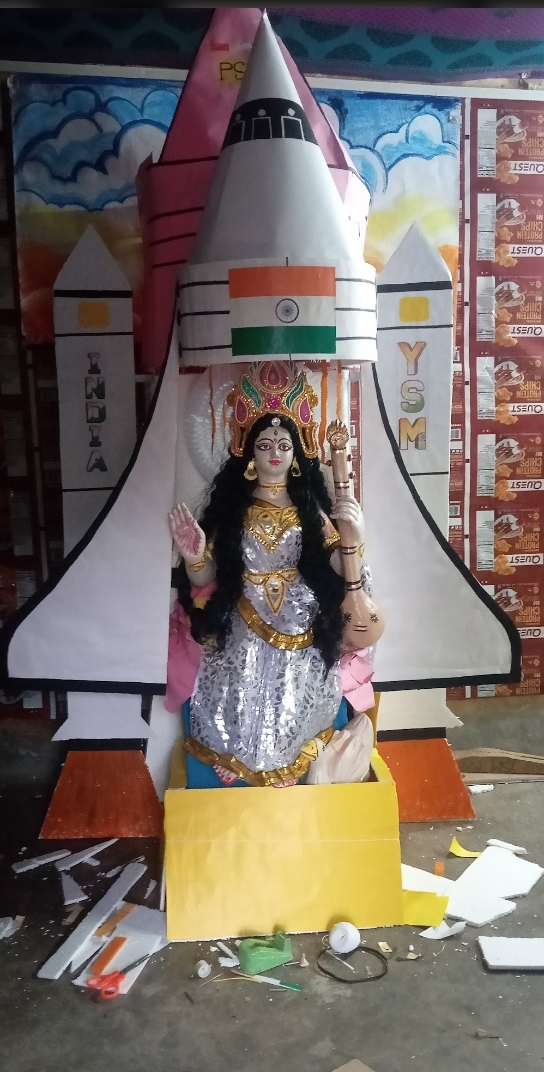
Mahubani

Mohubani (Hindi: mohubani, Bengali: mohubani) is a village in Gobindpur block of

Dhanbad District, in the Indian state of Jharkhand.

== Origin of its name ==
The name "Mohubani" may be derived from the words "mohua" - a kind of tree flower used to make a drink, and "ban" - a forest.

== Demographics ==
Mahubani Local Language is Hindi. Mahubani Village Total population is 1535 and number of houses are 308. Female Population is 48.1%. Village literacy rate is 56.9% and the Female Literacy rate is 21.8%.

== Geography and climate ==
Mohubani is located at 23.775252°N 86.5682316°E. It is 15 km from Dhanbad station, 18 km from Sindri, 12 km from Govindpur, 10 km from baliapur. Its nearest railway station and post office is chhota Ambona nearly 2 km from village, and its thana is Govindpur.

Mohubani features climate that is transitional between a humid subtropical climate and a tropical wet and dry climate. Summer starts from last week of March and ends in mid-June. Peak temperature in summer can reach 47 °C. Dhanbad also receives heavy rainfall. In winter, the minimum temperature remains around 12 °C with a maximum of 22 °C. Forests present are of a northern tropical dry deciduous type. In many of these forests, people are engaged in sericulture.

== Language ==
Hindi and Bengali are widely spoken. In addition, several tribal languages are also spoken, including Khortha.
