= Dharmabandh =

Village in Jharkhand, India

Coordinates: 23.790°N 86.264°E

Dharmabandh is a village in Jharkhand state of India. It is located in the Baghmara block of Dhanbad district. The village is administered by a panchayat.

Dharmabandh is half an hour-long drive from Katrash Garh. It was famous for its coal mines. Dharmabandh Mines were among best coal producer mines in Nineties. At the pic time of these mines, there were several colonies near by these mines and there were more than 100 families were leaving there. Most important mines were Mines no. 1 and 2 and there were BCCL's colonies Dharmabandh Camp and Staff quarters. Dharmabandh Camp had CISF camp and explosive store apart from that there were all labors quarter were there. While Staff quarters were for Officers of worth near by mines.
