= Rani Sati Mandir Mahuda =

Rani Sati Dadi Temple राणी सती दादी मंदिर
- राणी सती मं
- Location of Rani Sati Temple in Mahuda, Dhanbad, Jharkhand Rani Sati Mandir Mahuda (India)

Religion
- Affiliation: Hinduism
- District: Dhanbad
- Festival: Varshika Puja

Location
- State: Jharkhand
- Country: India
- Interactive map of Rani Sati Dadi Temple राणी सती दादी मंदिर
- Coordinates: 23.750591°N 86.269419°E

Architecture
- Type: hindu temple
- Completed: 20 February 1992
- Elevation: 207 m (679 ft)

Website
- www.dadisati.in

Rani Sati Mandir is located at Mahuda area in Dhanbad District, Jharkhand, India. It is a famous temple in this area.
