= Karmatanr =

Karmatanr may refer to:

- Karmatanr, Dhanbad, a census town in Dhanbad district, Jharkhand, India
- Karmatanr, Jamtara, a census town in Jamtara district, Jharkhand, India
- Karmatanr (community development block), Jamtara district, Jharkhand, India
