= Malkera =

- Census Town
- Location in Jharkhand, India Malkera (India)
- Coordinates: 23.78°N 86.3°E
- Country: India
- State: Jharkhand
- District: Dhanbad
- CD block: Baghmara

Area
  - Total: 2.56 km^{2} (0.99 sq mi)
- Elevation: 183 m (600 ft)

Population (2011)
  - Total: 8,232
  - Density: 3,220/km^{2} (8,330/sq mi)

Languages
  - Official: Hindi, Urdu
- Time zone: UTC+5:30 (IST)
- Postal code: 828304
- Vehicle registration: JH
- Lok Sabha constituency: Giridih
- Vidhan Sabha constituency: Baghmara
- Website: dhanbad.nic.in

Malkera is a census town in Baghmara CD block in Dhanbad Sadar subdivision of Dhanbad district in the Indian state of Jharkhand.

== Geography ==
Cities, towns and locations in the western portion of Dhanbad Sadar subdivision in Dhanbad district
MC: Municipal Corporation, CT: Census Town, N: Neighbourhood, R: Rural/ Urban centre
Owing to space constraints in the small map, the actual locations in a larger map may vary slightly

=== Location ===
Malkera is located at 23.78°N 86.3°E. It has an average elevation of 183 metres (600 feet).

Note: The map alongside presents some of the notable locations in the area. All places marked in the map are linked in the larger full screen map.

Malkera is constituted of places like Choutidih, Lal bungalow, New Colony, Trigunait basti, Green basti. The nearest market place is Katras which is at 15 minutes drive and nearly 3.5 km in distance. It has well maintained green patched area managed by Tata Steel. Malkera is at a distance of 20 km from Dhanbad town and 40 km from Bokaro.

=== Overview ===
The region shown in the map is a part of the undulating uplands bustling with coalmines. The Damodar River, the most important river of the Chota Nagpur Plateau, flows along the southern border. The area beyond the Damodar was once a part of Dhanbad district but was transferred to Bokaro district in 2001. Bulk of the area shown in the map is part of Baghmara (community development block). In Baghmara CD block 67% of the population lives in rural areas and 33% in urban areas. The block has 18 census towns, all marked in the map, except Rajganj, which is shown in the map for the northern portion of the district. A portion of Dhanbad Municipal Corporation extends into the region till around Katras. The places in the DMC area are marked as neighbourhoods. Most of the DMC area is shown in the maps for the central and southern portions of the district. Four operational areas of BCCL operate fully within the region – Katras Area, Govindpur Area, Barora Area and Block II Area. The Mahuda sector of Western Jharia Area also operates in the region.

== Demographics ==
As per the 2011 Census of India, Malkera had a total population of 8,232 of which 4,345 (53%) were males and 3,887 (47%) were females. Population below 6 years was 973. The total number of literates in Malkera was 5,904 (81.33% of the population over 6 years).

As of 2001 India census, Malkera had a population of 9,804. Males constituted 54% of the population and females 46%. Malkera had an average literacy rate of 64%, higher than the national average of 59.5%: male literacy was 75%, and female literacy was 52%. In Malkera, 14% of the population was under 6 years of age.

== Economy ==
Tata Steel has coal mines at Malkera. It also developed labor township here.

== Infrastructure ==
Malkera has an area of 2.56 km^{2}. It is 25 km from the district headquarters Dhanbad. There is a railway station at Malkera. Buses are available in the town. It has 8 km roads and both closed and open drains. The two major sources of protected water supply are tap water from treated sources and hand pumps. There are 1,438 domestic electric connections and 12 road light points. Amongst the educational facilities, it has 4 primary schools, 4 middle schools and 1 secondary school. Senior secondary school and general degree college is available at Katras 4 km away. Amongst the recreational and cultural facilities, it has a stadium and an auditorium/ community hall.

== Transport ==
There is a station at Malkera on the Gomoh-Adra line.

== Education ==
Since there is no English medium school situated here, children have to go either to D.A.V, Sijua or DE'NOBLI which are at a distance of 5 km to 6 km from here. The only high school situated here is Bhubneswar Trigunait Memorial high school(Hindi medium).

== Other places ==
The Parasnath forest region is just 25 km from the town of Malkera
