= Pradhankhunta Junction railway station =

Railway station in Dhanbad district, Jharkhand, India

PRADHANKHUNTA JUNCTION

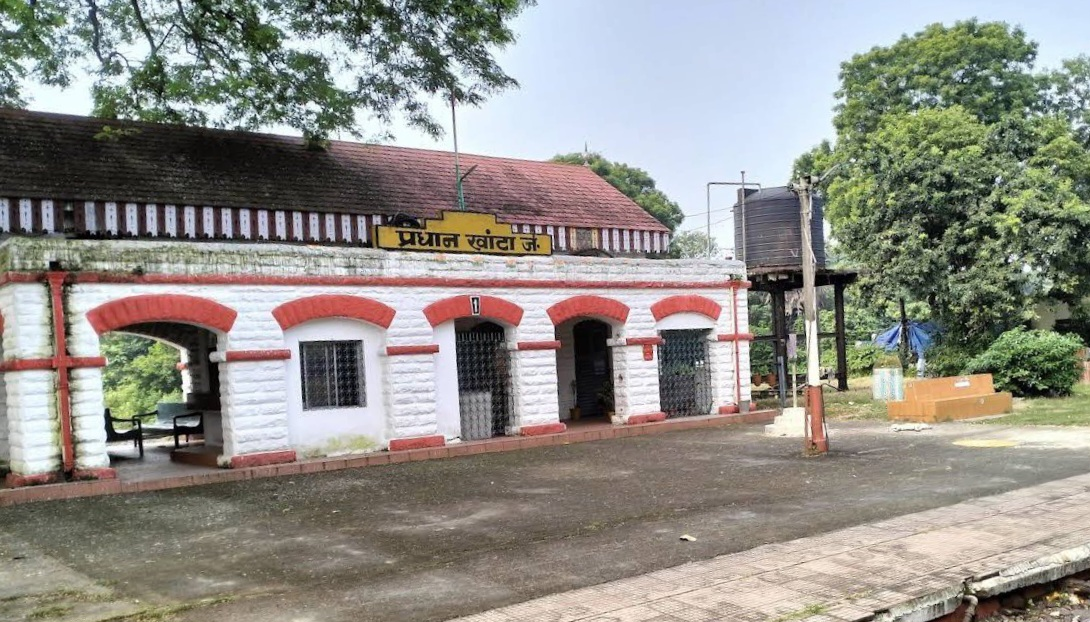

General information
- Location: Pradhankhunta, Dhanbad District, Jharkhand; India
- Coordinates: 23.77240°N 86.51695°E 1
- System: Indian Railways station
- Owner: Indian Railways
- Operator: East Central Railway
- Line: Howrah–Gaya–Delhi line
- Platforms: 6
- Tracks: Broad gauge

Construction
- Structure type: At-grade
- Parking: No

Other information
- Status: Active
- Station code: PKA
- Zone(s): East Central Railway
- Division(s): Dhanbad
- Classification: NSG-6

History
- Electrified: 1960−61
- Former names: East Indian Railway
Route map
- Sources: Google maps; Indian Railway Time Table (Indiarailinfo); Hatia-Bardhaman Passenger 53062; Gomoh-Barkakana Passenger 461EC
Location
- Location within Jharkhand
- Interactive map

Pradhankhunta Junction railway station (station code: PKA) is a railway station located in the Dhanbad district of the Indian state of Jharkhand. It falls under the Dhanbad division of the East Central Railway zone of Indian Railways.

== Administration ==
Pradhankhunta Junction is administered by the Dhanbad railway division of the East Central Railway zone of Indian Railways.

== Trains ==
The station primarily handles passenger and freight traffic. Given its proximity to the Jharia coalfield region, it plays a role in the transportation of coal and related goods.

== See also ==
- Dhanbad Junction railway station
- Dhanbad railway division
- Netaji Subhas Chandra Bose Gomoh Junction
- East Central Railway zone
