= Dhanbad Airport =

Airport in Dhanbad, Jharkhand, India

- IATA: DBD; ICAO: VEDB

Summary
- Airport type: Public
- Owner: Airports Authority of India
- Serves: Dhanbad
- Location: Barwaada, Jharkhand
- Elevation AMSL: 258 m / 847 ft
- Coordinates: 23°50′02″N 086°25′31″E

Map
- Location of the airport in India DBD (India)

Runways
Direction	Length		Surface
Direction	m	ft	Surface
07/25	1,136	3,728	Asphalt

Dhanbad Airport (IATA: DBD, ICAO: VEDB) is a public airport located at Dhanbad, in the state of Jharkhand, India. It is situated alongside the Grand Trunk Road at Barwaada. There are no scheduled flights into this airport.

The airport last saw scheduled commercial operations in the 1980s, when Vayudoot operated services to Patna, Kolkata and Ranchi until 1987. Since then, the airport is only used by small aircraft and helicopters. The then chief minister of Jharkhand Shibu Soren inaugurated a new passenger waiting hall in October 2008.

The State's Civil Aviation department invited proposals in July 2011 for operation of the airport based on Public-private partnership (PPP) model wherein the infrastructure would be provided by the State Government while the private company would be allowed to start chartered flights in addition to taking responsibility of day-to-day maintenance of the airport for a tenure of ten years. The private entity would be expected to construct administrative buildings, air traffic control and hangars.

Acting on the instruction of state civil aviation department, the local administration is preparing a proposal to develop a commercial airport at Baliapur block, 25 km from the district headquarters.
