= Baliapur =

- Census Town
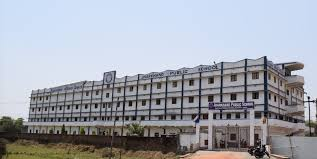

- Location in Jharkhand, India Baliapur (India)
- Coordinates: 23.727833°N 86.526167°E
- Country: India
- State: Jharkhand
- District: Dhanbad

Government
  - Type: Representative Democracy
  - Body: Gram Panchayat (East and West Baliapur)

Area
  - Total: 4.887 km^{2} (1.887 sq mi)
- Elevation: 199 m (653 ft)

Population (2011)
  - Total: 10,097
  - Density: 2,066/km^{2} (5,351/sq mi)

Languages
  - Official: Hindi, Urdu
- Time zone: UTC+5:30 (IST)
- PIN: 828201 (Baliapur)
- Telephone/ STD code: 0326
- Vehicle registration: JH 10
- Website: dhanbad.nic.in

Baliapur is a census town in Baliapur CD block in Dhanbad Sadar subdivision of Dhanbad district in the Indian state of Jharkhand.It is Divided into 2 Parts (East and West).

== Geography ==
Cities, towns and locations in the southern portion of Dhanbad Sadar subdivision in Dhanbad district
MC: Municipal Corporation, CT: Census Town, N: Neighbourhood, R: Rural/ Urban centre
Owing to space constraints in the small map, the actual locations in a larger map may vary slightly

=== Location ===
Baliapur is located at 23.727833°N 86.526167°E.

Note: The map alongside presents some of the notable locations in the area. All places marked in the map are linked in the larger full screen map.

=== Overview ===
The region shown in the map is a part of the undulating uplands bustling with coalmines. The Damodar River, the most important river of the Chota Nagpur Plateau, flows along the southern border. A major part of the area shown in the map is part of Dhanbad Municipal Corporation, an urban area. The places in the DMC area are marked as neighbourhoods. The western part of the region shown in the map is covered by Dhanbad (community development block). 57% of the population of Dhanbad CD block reside in rural areas and 43% reside in urban areas, The east-central part of the region shown in the map is covered by Baliapur (community development block). 86% of the population of Baliapur CD block reside in rural areas and 14% reside in urban areas. The places in the CD block areas are marked mostly as census towns. Three operational areas of BCCL operate fully within the region – Pootkee Balihari Area, Lodna Area and Eastern Jharia Area. The Moonidih sector of Western Jharia Area also operates in the region.

=== Police station ===
Baliapur police station serves Baliapur CD Block.

=== CD block HQ ===
Headquarters of Baliapur CD block is at Baliapur.

== Demographics ==
As per the 2011 Census of India, Baliapur had a total population of 10,097 of which 5,267 (52%) were males and 4,830 (48%) were females. Population below 6 years was 1,445. The total number of literates in Baliapur was 6,483 (74.93% of the population over 6 years).

== Infrastructure ==
Baliapur has an area of 4.887 km^{2}. It is 25 km from the district headquarters Dhanbad. There is a railway station at Rakshitpur 9 km away. Buses are available in the town. It has 47 km roads and open drains. The two major sources of protected water supply are hand pumps and uncovered wells. There are 1,453 domestic electric connections and 14 road light points. Amongst the medical facilities it has a hospital with 6 beds and 5 medicine shops. Amongst the educational facilities, it has 5 primary schools, 3 middle schools, 2 secondary schools, 2 senior secondary schools and 1 general degree college. Amongst the recreational facilities, it had a stadium. It had the branches of 1 nationalised bank, 1 cooperative bank and 1 agricultural credit society.

== Transport ==
Deuli-Khairpal Road and Patlabari-Jairampur Road cross at Baliapur.
