= Pradhan Khunta =

Pradhan Khunta PRADHANKHANTA
- Village
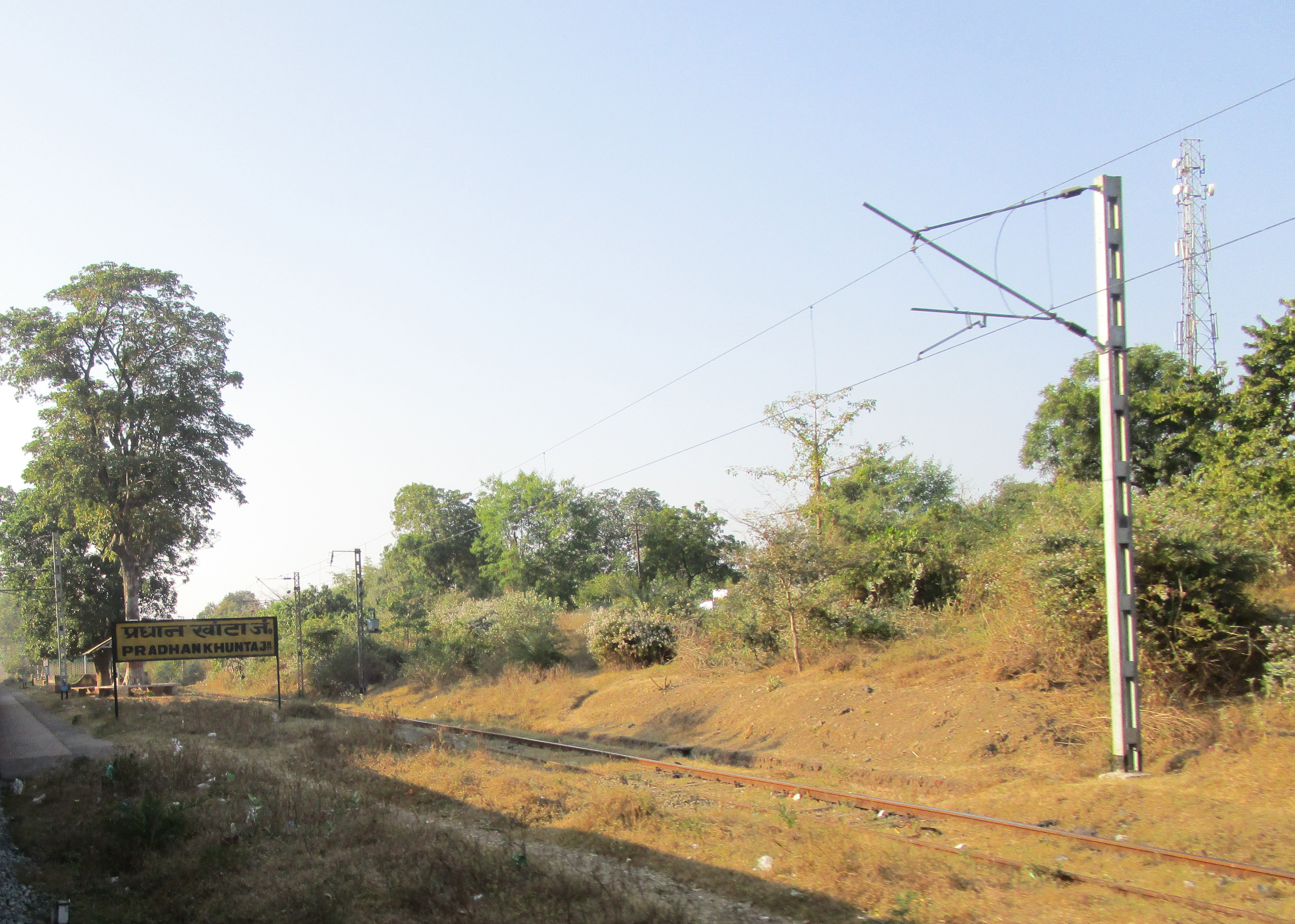
- Pradhan Khunta railway station.

- Location in Jharkhand, India Pradhan Khunta (India)
- Coordinates: 23.765833°N 86.523067°E
- Country: India
- State: Jharkhand
- District: Dhanbad

Government
  - Type: Representative Democracy
  - Body: Gram panchayat

Area
  - Total: 4.18 km^{2} (1.61 sq mi)
- Elevation: 199 m (653 ft)

Population (2011)
  - Total: 4,399
  - Density: 1,050/km^{2} (2,730/sq mi)

Languages
  - Official: Hindi, Urdu, Kudmali
- Time zone: UTC+5:30 (IST)
- PIN: 828201
- Telephone/ STD code: 0326
- Vehicle registration: JH 10
- Website: dhanbad.nic.in

Pradhan Khunta is a large village located in Baliapur Block of Dhanbad district, Jharkhand with total 840 families residing. It is located 199M above sea level.

== Overview ==
Pradhan Khunta is a large village located in Baliapur Block of Dhanbad district, Jharkhand with total 840 families residing.It is located 199M above sea level. Pradhankhanta Gram Panchayat is a Rural Local Body in Baliapur Panchayat Samiti part of Dhanbad Zila Parishad. There are total 3 Villages under Pradhankhanta Gram Panchayat jurisdiction. Gram Panchayat Baliapur is further divided into 13 Wards. Gram Panchayat Baliapur has total 13 schools.

== Geography ==
The Dhangi Hills (highest peak 385.57 m) run from Pradhan Khunta to Gobindpur.

== Demographics ==
As per the 2011 Census of India, Pradhan Khunta had a total population of 4,399 of which 2,274 (52%) were males and 2,125 (48%) were females. Population below 6 years was 587. The total number of literates in Pradhan Khunta was 2,930 (76.86% of the population over 6 years).

== Transport ==
The Asansol-Gaya section, a part of the Grand Chord, passes through this block. There is a station at Pradhan Khunta on this line.

Deuli-Khairpal Road passes through Pradhan Khunta and links it to NH 19, Baliapur and Sindri.

== Education And Healthcare ==
There are 13 schools in PradhanKhunta and 1 Hospital.

== Transport ==
Pradhankhunta railway station is in Dhanbad district making it an important railway station in the Indian state of Jharkhand. The station code name of Pradhankhunta is 'PKA'. As part of one of the busiest and populated Indian states, Jharkhand, the Pradhankhunta railway station is known amongst the top hundred train ticket booking and train traveling stations of the Indian Railway. The total number of trains that pass through Pradhankhunta (PKA) junction is 139.
