= Tundi (community development block) =

- Community development block
- Location in Jharkhand, India Tundi (India)
- Coordinates: 23°59′2″N 86°27′6″E
- Country: India
- State: Jharkhand
- District: Dhanbad

Government
  - Type: Representative democracy

Area
  - Total: 268.02 km^{2} (103.48 sq mi)
- Elevation: 219 m (719 ft)

Population (2011)
  - Total: 102,022
  - Density: 380.65/km^{2} (985.88/sq mi)

Languages
  - Official: Hindi, Urdu

Literacy (2011)
  - Total literates: 49,908 (59.43%)
- Time zone: UTC+5:30 (IST)
- PIN: 828142 (Tundi),
- Telephone/STD code: 06540
- Vehicle registration: JH 10
- Lok Sabha constituency: Giridih
- Vidhan Sabha constituency: Tundi
- Website: dhanbad.nic.in

Tundi is a community development block that forms an administrative division in Dhanbad Sadar subdivision of Dhanbad district, Jharkhand state, India.

== Overview ==
Dhanbad district forms a part of the Chota Nagpur Plateau, but it is more of an upland than a plateau. The district has two broad physical divisions – the southern part is a coal mining area with mining and industrial towns, and the northern part has villages scattered around hills. The landscape of the southern part is undulating and monotonous, with some scars of subsidence caused by underground mining. One of the many spurs of Parashnath Hills (1,365.50 m), located in neighbouring Giridih district, passes through the Topchanchi and Tundi areas of the district. The spur attains a height of 457.29 m but there is no peak as such. The Dhangi Hills (highest peak 385.57 m) run from Pradhan Khunta to Gobindpur. While the main river Damodar flows along the southern boundary, its tributary, the Barakar, flows along the northern boundary. DVC has built two dams across the rivers. The Panchet Dam is across the Damodar and the Maithon Dam is across the Barakar.

== Maoist activities ==
Jharkhand is one of the states affected by Maoist activities. As of 2012, Dhanbad was one of the highly/moderately affected districts in the state.As of 2016, Dhanbad was not identified as a focus area by the state police to check Maoist activities. However, there were some isolated Maoist activities in the Dhanbad area.

== Geography ==
Tundi is located at 23°59′2″N 86°27′6″E.

Tundi CD Block is bounded by Gandey CD Block, in Giridih district, and Narayanpur CD Block in Jamtara district, on the north, Purbi Tundi CD Block on the east, Govindpur and Baghmara CD Blocks on the south and Giridih and Pirtand CD Blocks, in Giridih district, on the west.

Tundi is located at the eastern end of the Pareshnath Hill with Barakar River flowing nearby.

Tundi CD Block has a forest area of 26,536.99 hectares, covering 67.11% of the area of the CD Block. This CD Block has a large forest area and a variety of agricultural products and handicrafts.

Tundi CD Block has an area of 268.02 km^{2}. It has 25 gram panchayats and 295 villages. Tundi Police Station serves this CD Block. Headquarters of this CD Block is at Tundi.

It is located 32 km from Dhanbad, the district headquarters.

== Demographics ==
=== Population ===
As per the 2011 Census of India Tundi CD Block had a total population of 102,022, all of which were rural. There were 52,181 (51%) males and 49,841 (49%) females. Population below 6 years was 18,046. Scheduled Castes numbered 10,907 (10.69%) and Scheduled Tribes numbered 41,502 (40.68%).

The only large village (with 4,000+ population) in Tundi CD Block is (2011 census figures in brackets): Tundi (4,221).

=== Literacy ===
As of 2011 census the total number of literates in Tundi CD Block was 49,908 (59.43% of the population over 6 years) out of which males numbered 31,415 (73.08% of the male population over 6 years) and females numbered 18,943 (45.11% of the female population over 6 years). The gender disparity (the difference between female and male literacy rates) was 27.97%.

As of 2011 census, literacy in Dhanbad district was 74.52%. Literacy in Jharkhand was 66.41% in 2011. Literacy in India in 2011 was 74.04%.

See also – List of Jharkhand districts ranked by literacy rate

Literacy in CD Blocks of
Dhanbad district
Tundi – 59.43%
Purbi Tundi – 61.20%
Topchanchi – 74.10%
Baghmara – 74.92%
Govindpur – 68.53%
Dhanbad – 78.47%
Baliapur – 70.32%
Nirsa – 68.92%
Jharia – 73.82%
Source: 2011 Census: CD Block Wise
Primary Census Abstract Data,
except for Jharia CD Block
where 2001 data has been used

=== Language ===
Hindi is the official language in Jharkhand and Urdu has been declared as an additional official language. Jharkhand legislature had passed a bill according the status of a second official language to several languages in 2011 but the same was turned down by the Governor.

In the 2011 census, Hindi was the mother-tongue (languages mentioned under Schedule 8 of the Constitution of India) of 62.5% of the population in Dhanbad district, followed by Bengali (19.3%) and Urdu (8.1%). The scheduled tribes constituted 8.4% of the total population of the district. Amongst the scheduled tribes those speaking Santali formed 77.2% of the ST population. Other tribes found in good numbers were: Munda, Mahli and Kora.

== Economy ==
=== Livelihood ===
Livelihood
in Tundi CD Block
1. Cultivators (25.3%)
2. Agricultural labourers (42.7%)
3. Household industries (4.24%)
4. Other Workers (27.8%)

In Tundi CD Block in 2011, amongst the class of total workers, cultivators numbered 10,969 and formed 25.31%, agricultural labourers numbered 18,492 and formed 42.67%, household industry workers numbered 1,839 and formed 4.24% and other workers numbered 12,041 and formed 27.78%.

Note: In the census records a person is considered a cultivator, if the person is engaged in cultivation/ supervision of land owned. When a person who works on another person's land for wages in cash or kind or share, is regarded as an agricultural labourer. Household industry is defined as an industry conducted by one or more members of the family within the household or village, and one that does not qualify for registration as a factory under the Factories Act. Other workers are persons engaged in some economic activity other than cultivators, agricultural labourers and household workers. It includes factory, mining, plantation, transport and office workers, those engaged in business and commerce, teachers and entertainment artistes.

=== Infrastructure ===
There are 190 inhabited villages in Tundi CD Block. In 2011, 117 villages had power supply. 35 villages had tap water (treated/ untreated), 171 villages had well water (covered/ uncovered), 172 villages had hand pumps, and 17 villages had no drinking water facility. 21 villages had post offices, 34 villages had sub post offices, 12 villages had telephones (land lines), 24 villages had public call offices and 89 villages had mobile phone coverage. 172 villages had pucca (paved) village roads, 15 villages had bus service (public/ private), 6 villages had railway stations, 26 villages had autos/ modified autos, and 57 villages had tractors. 7 villages had bank branches, 4 villages had agricultural credit societies, 19 villages had cinema/ video halls, 18 villages had public library and public reading rooms. 122 villages had public distribution system, 39 villages had weekly haat (market) and 97 villages had assembly polling stations.

=== Agriculture ===
Dhanbad district has infertile laterite soil, having a general tendency towards continuous deterioration. The soil can be classified in two broad categories – red sandy soil and red and yellow soil. There are patches of alluvium along the river banks. Limited water resources constitute a major constraint for cultivation. Paddy is the main crop. The soils for rice cultivation fall into three categories – baad, kanali and bahal. Aghani, is the main winter crop, consisting primarily of winter rice. Bhadai is the autumn crop. Apart from paddy, less important grain crops such as marua and maize are grown. The Rabi crop includes such cold weather crops as wheat, barley, oats, gram and pulses.

=== Backward Regions Grant Fund ===
Dhanbad district is listed as a backward region and receives financial support from the Backward Regions Grant Fund. The fund, created by the Government of India, is designed to redress regional imbalances in development. As of 2012, 272 districts across the country were listed under this scheme. The list includes 21 districts of Jharkhand.

== Transport ==
State Highway 13 (Jharkhand), locally popular as Koderma-Giridih-Govindpur Road, passes through this block.

== Education ==
In 2011, amongst the 190 inhabited villages in Tundi CD Block, 45 villages had no primary school, 136 villages had one primary school and 9 villages had more than one primary school. 50 villages had at least one primary school and one middle school. 7 villages had at least one middle school and one secondary school.

== Healthcare ==
In 2013, Tundi CD Block had 1 block primary health centre and 4 primary health centres with total 30 beds and 10 doctors (excluding private bodies). 1,183 patients were treated indoor and 57,236 patients were treated outdoor in the hospitals, health centres and subcentres of the CD Block.

In 2011, amongst the 190 inhabited villages in Tundi CD Block, 9 villages had primary health centres, 15 villages had primary health sub-centres, 3 villages had maternity and child welfare centres, 1 village had a TB Clinic, 1 village had an allopathic hospital, 1 village had an alternative medicine hospital, 1 village had a dispensary, 2 villages had veterinary hospitals, 15 villages had medicine shops and 144 villages had no medical facilities.
