= Baghmara (community development block) =

Baghmara Baghmara-cum-Katras
- Community development block
- Location in Jharkhand, India Baghmara (India)
- Coordinates: 23°47′47″N 86°12′5″E
- Country: India
- State: Jharkhand
- District: Dhanbad
- CD block: Baghmara

Government
  - Type: Representative democracy

Area
  - Total: 267.55 km^{2} (103.30 sq mi)
- Elevation: 245 m (804 ft)

Population (2011)
  - Total: 334,309
  - Density: 1,249.5/km^{2} (3,236.2/sq mi)

Languages
  - Official: Hindi, Urdu

Literacy (2011)
  - Total literates: 214,888 (74.92%)
- Time zone: UTC+5:30 (IST)
- PIN: 828114 (Katras Bazar) 828113 (Katrasgarh) 828305 (Mahuda)
- Telephone/STD code: 06542
- Vehicle registration: JH 10
- Lok Sabha constituency: Giridih
- Vidhan Sabha constituency: Baghmara
- Website: dhanbad.nic.in

Baghmara is a community development block that forms an administrative division in Dhanbad Sadar subdivision of Dhanbad district, Jharkhand state, India.

== Overview ==
Dhanbad district forms a part of the Chota Nagpur Plateau, but it is more of an upland than a plateau. The district has two broad physical divisions – the southern part is a coal mining area with mining and industrial towns, and the northern part has villages scattered around hills. The landscape of the southern part is undulating and monotonous, with some scars of subsidence caused by underground mining. One of the many spurs of Parashnath Hills (1,365.50 m), located in neighbouring Giridih district, passes through the Topchanchi and Tundi areas of the district. The spur attains a height of 457.29 m but there is no peak as such. The Dhangi Hills (highest peak 385.57 m) run from Pradhan Khunta to Gobindpur. While the main river Damodar flows along the southern boundary, its tributary, the Barakar, flows along the northern boundary. DVC has built two dams across the rivers. The Panchet Dam is across the Damodar and the Maithon Dam is across the Barakar.

== Maoist activities ==
Jharkhand is one of the states affected by Maoist activities. As of 2012, Dhanbad was one of the highly/moderately affected districts in the state.As of 2016, Dhanbad was not identified as a focus area by the state police to check Maoist activities. However, there were some isolated Maoist activities in the Dhanbad area.

== Geography ==
Baghmara is located at 23°47′47″N 86°12′5″E.

Baghmara CD Block is bounded by Topchanchi and Tundi CD Blocks, on the north, Govindpur and Dhanbad CD Blocks on the east, Chas CD Block, in Bokaro district, in the south and Chandrapura and Nawadih CD Blocks, in Bokaro district, on the west.

Baghmara CD Block has a forest area of 4,979.67 hectares, covering 18.45% of the area of the CD Block.

Baghmara CD Block has an area of 267.55 km^{2} (103.30 sq mi). It has 71 gram panchayats and 227 villages. Baghmara, Katras, Mahuda and Tetulmari Police Stations serve this block. Headquarters of this CD Block is at Baghmara.

It is located 32 km from Dhanbad, the district headquarters.

== Demographics ==
=== Population ===
As per the 2011 Census of India Baghmara CD Block had a total population of 334,309, of which 222,657 were rural and 111,652 were urban. There were 175,479 (52%) males and 158,830 (48%) females. Population below 6 years was 47,472. Scheduled Castes numbered 69,474 (20.78%) and Scheduled Tribes numbered 17,737 (5.31%).

Baghmara CD Block has several census towns (2011 population figure in brackets): Matigara (5,685), Bhimkanari (5,170), Nadkharki (4,427), Madhuban (4,316), Barora (3,890), Dumra (6,772), Harina (4,637), Muraidih (6,360), Rajganj (8,820), Mahlidih (6,381), Kharkhari (5,656), Sahnidih (6,777), Malkera (8,232), Nagri Kalan (9,410), Baua Kalan (9,489), Phulwartanr (5,884), Jhinghipahari (4,550) and Mahuda (5,196).

Large villages (with 4,000+ population) in Baghmara CD Block are (2011 census figures in brackets): Latipahari (4,790), Ranguni (4,056), Raghunathpur (4,110), Kanrra (4,258) and Singra (4,017).

=== Literacy ===
As of 2011 census the total number of literates in Baghmara CD Block was 214,888 (74.92% of the population over 6 years) out of which males numbered 128,719 (85.46% of the male population over 6 years) and females numbered 86,169 (63.26% of the female population over 6 years). The gender disparity (the difference between female and male literacy rates) was 22.20%.

As of 2011 census, literacy in Dhanbad district was 74.52%. Literacy in Jharkhand was 66.41% in 2011. Literacy in India in 2011 was 74.04%.

See also – List of Jharkhand districts ranked by literacy rate

Literacy in CD Blocks of
Dhanbad district
Tundi – 59.43%
Purbi Tundi – 61.20%
Topchanchi – 74.10%
Baghmara – 74.92%
Govindpur – 68.53%
Dhanbad – 78.47%
Baliapur – 70.32%
Nirsa – 68.92%
Jharia – 73.82%
Source: 2011 Census: CD Block Wise
Primary Census Abstract Data,
except for Jharia CD Block
where 2001 data has been used

=== Language ===
Hindi is the official language in Jharkhand and Urdu has been declared as an additional official language. Jharkhand legislature had passed a bill according the status of a second official language to several languages in 2011 but the same was turned down by the Governor.

Languages of Baghmara-cum-Katras
1. Khortha (57.5%)
2. Hindi (11.5%)
3. Bengali (10.1%)
4. Magadhi (7.19%)
5. Santali (3.86%)
6. Urdu (3.85%)
7. Bhojpuri (3.63%)
8. Other (2.36%)

According to the 2011 census, the languages spoken in the Baghmara-cum-Katras block are as follows: Khortha is the most widely spoken language at 57.49%, followed by Hindi at 11.51%. Other languages include Bengali (10.11%), Magadhi (7.19%), Santali (3.86%), Urdu (3.85%), and Bhojpuri (3.63%).

== Economy ==
=== Livelihood ===
Livelihood
in Baghmara CD Block
1. Cultivators (7.67%)
2. Agricultural labourers (6.95%)
3. Household industries (2.06%)
4. Other Workers (83.3%)

In Baghmara CD Block in 2011, amongst the class of total workers, cultivators numbered 7,276 and formed 7.67%, agricultural labourers numbered 6,594 and formed 6.95%, household industry workers numbered 1,953 and formed 2.06% and other workers numbered 78,994 and formed 83.31%.

Note: In the census records a person is considered a cultivator, if the person is engaged in cultivation/ supervision of land owned. When a person who works on another person's land for wages in cash or kind or share, is regarded as an agricultural labourer. Household industry is defined as an industry conducted by one or more members of the family within the household or village, and one that does not qualify for registration as a factory under the Factories Act. Other workers are persons engaged in some economic activity other than cultivators, agricultural labourers and household workers. It includes factory, mining, plantation, transport and office workers, those engaged in business and commerce, teachers and entertainment artistes.

=== Infrastructure ===
There are 178 inhabited villages in Baghmara CD Block. In 2011, 162 villages had power supply. 52 villages had tap water (treated/ untreated), 167 villages had well water (covered/ uncovered), 165 villages had hand pumps, and 10 villages had no drinking water facility. 26 villages had post offices, 20 villages had sub post offices, 36 villages had telephones (land lines), 73 villages had public call offices and 123 villages had mobile phone coverage. 168 villages had pucca (paved) village roads, 58 villages had bus service (public/ private), 18 villages had railway stations, 39 villages had autos/ modified autos, and 74 villages had tractors. 12 villages had bank branches, 8 villages had agricultural credit societies, 11 villages had cinema/ video halls, 13 villages had public library and public reading rooms. 157 villages had public distribution system, 18 villages had weekly haat (market) and 110 villages had assembly polling stations.

=== Coal ===
Jharia coalfield is the richest treasure house of metallurgical coal in India. The Barora, Block II and Katras Areas of BCCL are located in Baghmara CD Block.

The following collieries function under the Barora Area: Madhuband, Phularitand, Muraidih and Shatabdi. Collieries functioning in Block II Area are: Madhkurkee, Benidih, Jamunia and Block II. Collieries functioning in Katras Area are: Salanpur, Angarpathar, Keshalpur, Ramkanali, Ramkanali OC, West Mudidih, Galitand, Keshalpur OC, Katras Chot and East Katras.

The Barora Area of BCCL is located in the western part of the district. Damoda colliery of this area is located in Bokaro district. Block II Project was funded by the World Bank. Madhuban Coal Washery is functionally under Block II Area. Some parts of Katras Area is affected by fire.

=== Agriculture ===
Dhanbad district has infertile laterite soil, having a general tendency towards continuous deterioration. The soil can be classified in two broad categories – red sandy soil and red and yellow soil. There are patches of alluvium along the river banks. Limited water resources constitute a major constraint for cultivation. Paddy is the main crop. The soils for rice cultivation fall into three categories – baad, kanali and bahal. Aghani, is the main winter crop, consisting primarily of winter rice. Bhadai is the autumn crop. Apart from paddy, less important grain crops such as marua and maize are grown. The Rabi crop includes such cold weather crops as wheat, barley, oats, gram and pulses.

=== Backward Regions Grant Fund ===
Dhanbad district is listed as a backward region and receives financial support from the Backward Regions Grant Fund. The fund, created by the Government of India, is designed to redress regional imbalances in development. As of 2012, 272 districts across the country were listed under this scheme. The list includes 21 districts of Jharkhand.

== Transport ==
The Adra-Gomoh branch line passes through this block. There are stations at Mahuda, Kharkhari and Malkera on this line.

== Education ==
In 2011, amongst the 178 inhabited villages in Baghmara CD Block, 30 villages had no primary school, 108 villages had one primary school and 40 villages had more than one primary school. 71 villages had at least one primary school and one middle school. 32 villages had at least one middle school and one secondary school.

== Healthcare ==
In 2013, Baghmara CD Block had 1 block primary health centre, 4 primary health centres and 7 private nursing homes with total 30 beds and 12 doctors (excluding private bodies). 6,153 patients were treated indoor and 42,552 patients were treated outdoor in the hospitals, health centres and subcentres of the CD Block.

In 2011, amongst the 178 inhabited villages in Baghmara CD Block, 4 villages had primary health centres, 15 villages had primary health sub-centres, 6 villages had maternity and child welfare centres, 3 village had a TB Clinic, 7 village had an allopathic hospital, 4 village had an alternative medicine hospital, 18 village had a dispensary, 2 villages had veterinary hospitals, 15 villages had medicine shops and 113 villages had no medical facilities.
