= Spur (topography) =

Geographical term for a lateral ridge or tongue of land

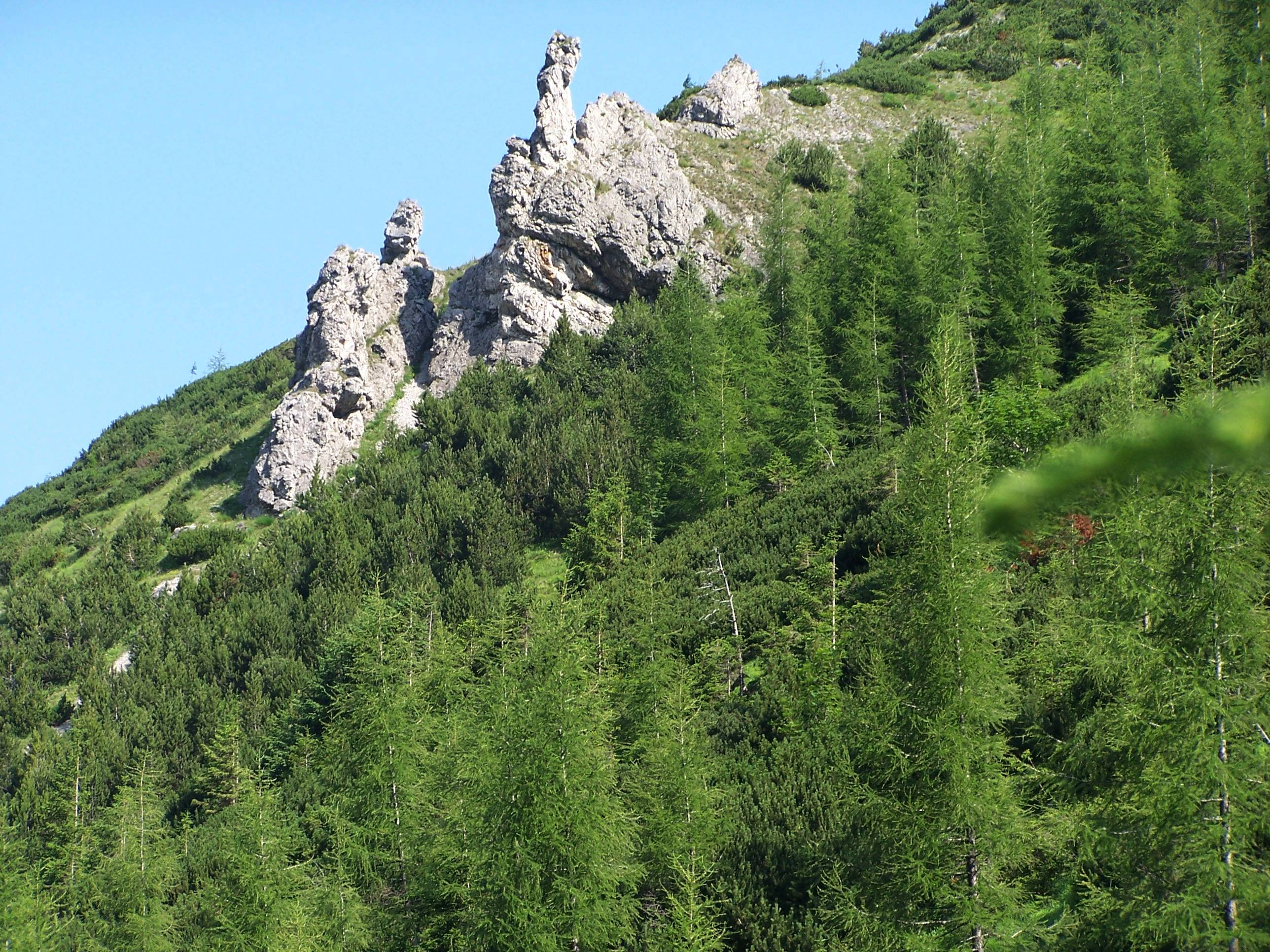
A spur in the Tatra Mountains

A spur is a lateral ridge or tongue of land descending from a hill, mountain or main crest of a ridge. It can also be defined as another hill or mountain range which projects in a lateral direction from a main hill or mountain range.

Examples of spurs include:

- Abbott Spur, which separates the lower ends of Rutgers Glacier and Allison Glacier on the west side of the Royal Society Range in Victoria Land, Antarctica
- Boott Spur, a subpeak of Mount Washington
- Kaweah Peaks Ridge, a spur of the Great Western Divide, a sub-range of California's Sierra Nevada
- Kelley Spur, four kilometres (two nautical miles) east of Spear Spur on the south side of Dufek Massif in the Pensacola Mountains, Antarctica
- Geneva Spur on Mount Everest
- Sperrin Mountains in Northern Ireland

== See also ==
- Draw or re-entrant, the low ground between two spurs
- Spur castle
