= Dhanbad district =

Coordinates: 23°47′24″N 86°25′48″E

Dhanbad district Dhanbād Jilā
- District of Jharkhand
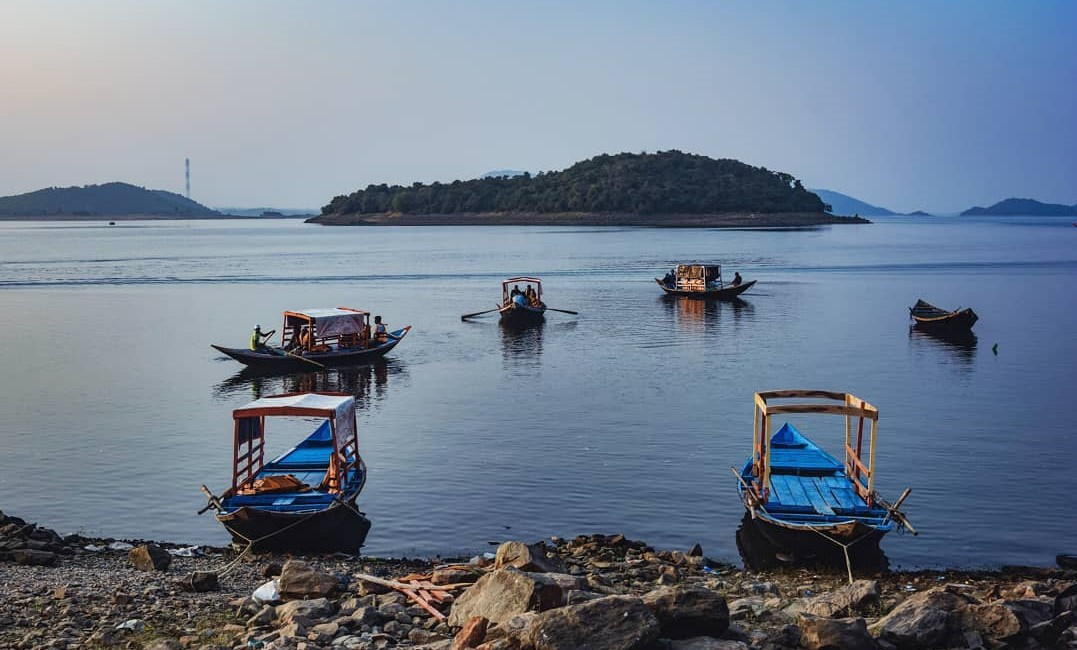
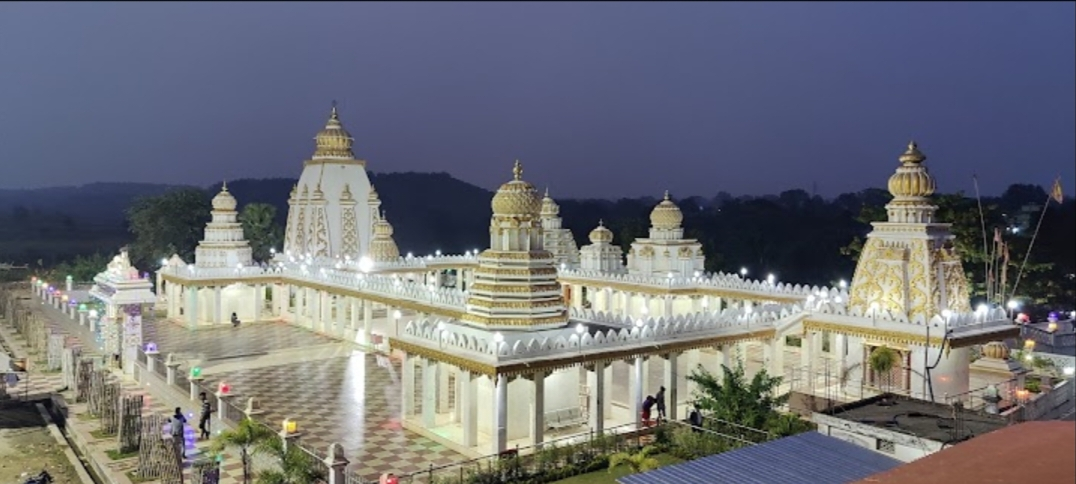
- From Top: Maithon Dam, RamRaj Mandir(Baghmara)
- Interactive map of Dhanbad district
- Country: India
- State: Jharkhand
- Division: North Chotanagpur
- Headquarters: Dhanbad

Government
  - Deputy Commissioner: Shri Aditya Ranjan (IAS)
  - Senior Superintendent of police: Shri Prabhat Kumar (IPS)
  - Lok Sabha constituencies: Dhanbad
  - MP: Dulu Mahato (BJP)
  - Vidhan Sabha constituencies: 6

Area
  - Total: 2,040 km^{2} (790 sq mi)
  - Rank: 19th

Population (2011)
  - Total: 2,684,487
  - Rank: 2nd
  - Density: 1,320/km^{2} (3,410/sq mi)
  - Rank: 1st
  - Urban: 1,560,394

Languages
  - Official: Hindi

Demographics
  - Literacy: 74.52 per cent
  - Sex ratio: 908
- Time zone: UTC+05:30 (IST)
- Major highways: NH 19 NH 18, NH 218 NH 419
- Website: dhanbad.nic.in

Dhanbad district is one of the twenty-four districts of Jharkhand state, India, and Dhanbad is the administrative headquarters of this district. As of 2011, it is the second most populous district of Jharkhand (out of 24), after Ranchi. It also has the lowest sex ratio in Jharkhand, at 908.

Dhanbad is also known as the coal capital of India, due to extensive coal mining industry that dominates the district.

== History ==
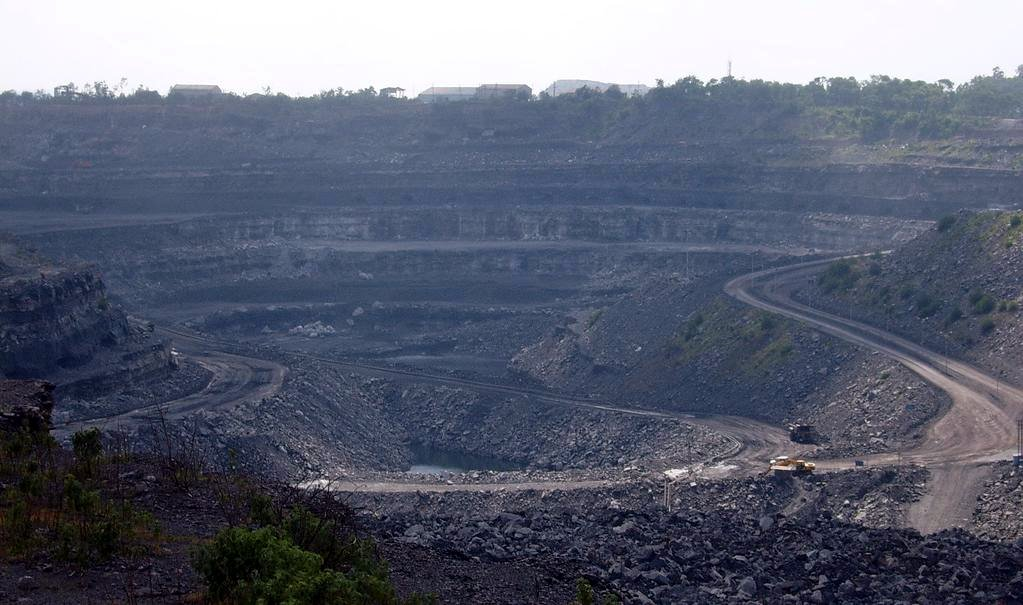
Coal Mining in Dhanbad. Coal mining is the biggest industry here.

Dhanbad district was constituted in 1956 by carving out the old Dhanbad subdivision Chas and Chandankiyari police stations of the Sadar subdivision of the erstwhile Manbhum district. Dhanbad is Police district since 1928. The re-organisation of the districts in the State of Bihar which took place after 1971 did not affect the district of Dhanbad. Dhanbad Municipality is the chief town and the headquarters of the district. In the year 1991, Bokaro District was constituted by carving out Chas Sub-division of Dhanbad district and Bermo Subdivision of Giridih District.

The early history of the greater part of the Chotanagpur Plateau is shrouded in mystery and that of Dhanbad district is particularly so. Details of even later periods are difficult to trace as the present district formed but a small and insignificant part of Manbhum. In the Settlement Report for Manbhum (1928) it has been stated that no rock inscriptions, copper plates or old coins were discovered and not a single document of copper plate or palm leaf was found in course of the Survey and Settlement operations. The oldest authentic documents produced were all on paper and barely even a hundred years old.

In view of these circumstances the District Gazetteer for Dhanbad (1964) merely reproduces the chapter on history in the Settlement Report of 1928 which pertains to the entire district of Manbhum. It was a small village of the erstwhile district of Manbhum which had its headquarters in Purulia (now in West Bengal). Manbhum in turn, derived its name from Raja Man Singh, who was gifted this territory by Emperor Akbar, following his victory in a certain battle. The district being extremely vast and far-flung soon got divided into Birbhum, Manbhum and Singhbhum, for administrative purposes.

However, on 24 October 1956 Dhanbad was declared a District on the Recommendation of the State Reconstitution Commission vide notification 1911. Its geographical length, extending from north to south, was 43 miles and breadth 47 miles, stretching across east to west. In 1991 a part of Dhanbad was sliced away from Bokaro district, diminishing thereby its total area to 2995 km^{2}.

Earlier, the district was split into two sub – divisions – Dhanbad Sadar and Baghmara. The former incorporated 6 blocks, while the latter had four and together they enclosed 30 Nagar Palikas, 228 Panchayats and 1654 villages. The then vastness of the district called for two police headquarters, based at Bokaro and Dhanbad respectively. Meanwhile, the district as its stands today, has only one sub-division called the Dhanbad Sadar. There are presently, 8 blocks here viz. Jharia, Baghmara, Dhanbad, Nirsa, Govindpur, Baliapur, Tundi, and Topchanchi. The blocks in turn have 181 panchayats and 1348 villages. As per the 1991 Census, the total population of the districts stands at 19,49,526 of which the number of males have been recorded as 10,71,913 along with 8,77,613 females. There are 100,850 acres (408.1 km^{2}) of hillocks and 56,454 acres (228.46 km^{2}) of forests. It is about 500–1000 feet above Sea level. Its soil is, by and large lateritic in nature.

The district is currently a part of the Red Corridor.

== Geography ==
The district is bounded on the west by Hazaribagh and Bokaro on the north by Giridih and Jamtara and Paschim Barddhaman (West Bengal) on the east and south by Purulia district of West Bengal. It is situated in the state of Jharkhand and lies between 23°37'3" N and 24°4' N latitude and between 86°6'30" E and 86°50' E longitude.

=== Natural divisions ===
The district can be divided into three broad natural divisions, namely, (I) the north and north western portions consisting of the hilly region, (ii) the uplands containing coal mines and most of the industries and (iii) the remaining uplands and plains lying to the south of the Damodar river consisting of cultivable flat lands. The north and north western division is separated for the entire length by the Grand trunk road.

In the western middle part of the district are the Dhangi hills, situated in the strip falling between the Grand trunk road in the north and the Grand chord line of the Eastern Railway. In the south, these hills extend from Pradhankhanta to Govindpur, reaching a maximum altitude of 1,256 feet at Dhangi. Further north, a branch of the Parasnath hill runs through Topchanchi and Tundi, the highest point of 1,500 feet being reached at Lalki. The southern part of the district is largely undulating land. The general slope is from west to east, the direction followed by the two major rivers, Damodar and Barakar.

=== Rivers ===
The Damodar is the most important river of the Chotanagpur plateau. It rises in Palamu and flows eastward between the plateaus of Ranchi and Hazaribag. It is joined by the Bokaro, the Konar and the Barakar rivers. The Damodar enters Dhanbad district at its confluence with the Jamunia, a stream which marks the western boundary of Dhanbad with Hazaribagh District. Further east, the Damodar is joined by the Katri River which rises in the foothills below Parasnath and traverses through the Coal-field Area. The Damodar flows for about 77 km through the district being joined by the Barakar at its eastern border near Chirkunda. The Panchet dam extending to roughly 6 km is built on river Damodar. The hydel station there generates 40,000 kW.

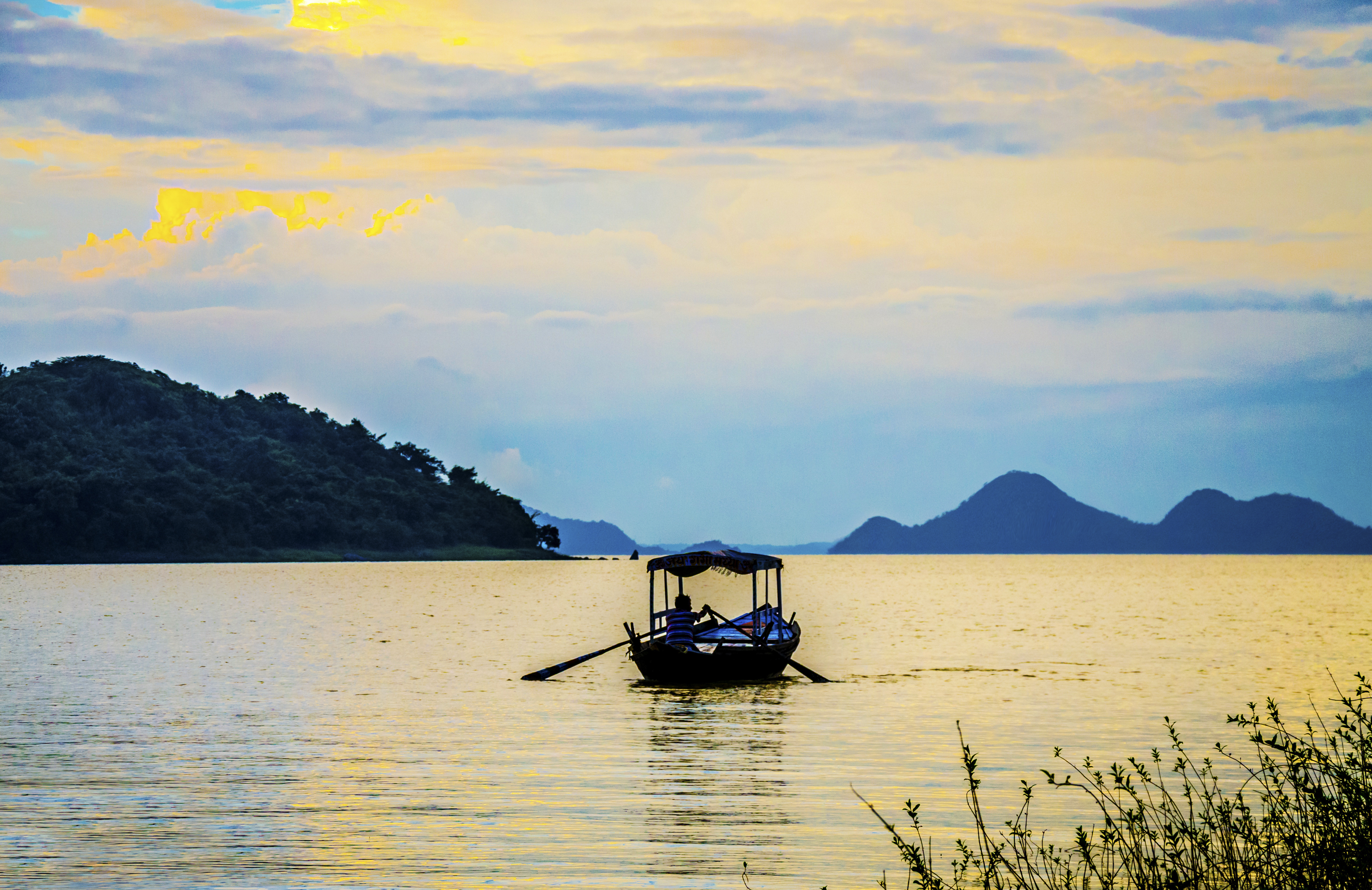
Sunset at Maithon Dam

The Barakar, which forms the northern boundary of the district, traverses about 77 km in the district. It flows in south westerly direction up to Durgapur and then south till it joins the Damodar near Panchet. The Maithon dam is located on this river about 13 km off its confluence with the Damodar. Attached to it is the Maithan Power Station with a generating capacity of 60,000 kW. Among other small rivers in the district are Gobai, the Irji, the Khudia besides the river Katri.

=== Climatic conditions ===
The climate of the district is characterised by general dryness. It is very pleasant during the cold weather from November to February. Thereafter the climate becomes warm. It remains hot until the monsoon breaks towards the middle of June. With the setting in of rains, the temperature falls and humidity rises; July to October are the rainy months. July and August are the wettest months. The average rainfall during July is 287 mm and that in August 445 mm. The average annual rainfall in the district is approximately 1300 mm.

== Economy ==
Dhanbad has one of the oldest and largest markets in the region and is also a centre of large scale industries. It is known for its coal mines and industrial establishments; the city is surrounded by about 112 coal mines with a total production of 27.5 million tonnes and an annual income of 7,000 million rupees through coal business. There are a number of coal washeries there. As of 8 September 2009 it is one of the 21 districts in Jharkhand currently receiving funds from the Backward Regions Grant Fund Programme (BRGF).

See Economy of Dhanbad. DH

== Demographics ==
Historical population
Year	Pop.	±% p.a.
1901	316,527	—
1911	417,800	+2.81%
1921	469,610	+1.18%
1931	544,230	+1.49%
1941	616,770	+1.26%
1951	750,681	+1.98%
1961	980,520	+2.71%
1971	1,141,486	+1.53%
1981	1,588,795	+3.36%
1991	1,949,526	+2.07%
2001	2,397,102	+2.09%
2011	2,684,487	+1.14%

Religion in Dhanbad district (2011)
Religion	Per cent
Hinduism	80.07%
Islam	16.08%
Sarna	2.88%
Christianity	0.42%
Not stated	0.55%

According to the 2011 census Dhanbad district has a population of 2,684,487, roughly equal to the nation of Kuwait or the US state of Nevada. This gives it a ranking of 148th in India (out of a total of 640). The district has a population density of 1,316 inhabitants per square kilometre (3,410/sq mi). Its population growth rate over the decade 2001–2011 was 11.91%. Dhanbad has a sex ratio of 908 females for every 1000 males, and a literacy rate of 74.52%. 58.13% of the population lives in urban areas. Scheduled Castes and Scheduled Tribes make up 16.29% and 8.68% of the population respectively.

Languages of Dhanbad district (2011)
1. Hindi (26.8%)
2. Khortha (25.2%)
3. Bengali (17.9%)
4. Urdu (8.47%)
5. Santali (7.24%)
6. Magahi (5.19%)
7. Bhojpuri (4.46%)
8. Kurmali (1.44%)
9. Others (3.25%)

At the time of the 2011 Census of India, 26.80% of the population in the district spoke Hindi, 25.20% Khortha, 17.95% Bengali, 8.47% Urdu, 7.24% Santali, 5.19% Magahi, 4.46% Bhojpuri and 1.44% Kurmali a first language.

== Community Development Blocks in Dhanbad ==
There are 10 Community Development Blocks in Dhanbad.

Dhanbad (community development block) Baliapur (community development block) Baghmara (community development block) Nirsa (community development block) Tundi (community development block) Purbi Tundi (community development block) Gobindpur block Kaliasole (community development block) Topchanchi (community development block) and Egarkund (community development block)

== Politics ==
District	No.	Constituency	Name	Party	Alliance	Remarks	Dhanbad	38	Sindri	Bablu Mahato	CPI(ML)L
39	Nirsa	Arup Chatterjee					Dhanbad				CPI(ML)L
40	Dhanbad	Raj Sinha		BJP	NDA		Dhanbad				
41	Jharia	Ragini Singh		BJP	NDA		Dhanbad				
42	Tundi	Mathura Prasad Mahato		JMM	MGB		Dhanbad				
43	Baghmara	Shatrughan Mahto		BJP	NDA		Dhanbad				

== Education ==
- IIT (ISM) Dhanbad
- Birsa Institute of Technology Sindri (BIT Sindri)
- Binod Bihari Mahto Koyalanchal University
- Shaheed Nirmal Mahto Medical College, Dhanbad
- K. K. College of Engineering and Management
- Law College Dhanbad
- Guru Nanak College, Dhanbad
- SSLNT Women's College
- Jawahar Navodaya Vidyalaya
- Kendriya Vidyalaya
- Tata D.A.V School, Jamadoba
- Delhi Public School, Dhanbad
- De Nobili School, CMRI
- De Nobili School, FRI

== See also ==
- Dhanbad Cricket Association is regulatory body of game of cricket in Dhanbad District.
