= AISECT University, Jharkhand =

Private university in Hazaribagh, Jharkhand, India

AISECT University
- University Logo
- Other name: AISECT
- Motto: Where aspirations become achievements.
- Type: Private
- Established: 2016; 10 years ago
- Founder: AISECT
- Accreditation: UGC
- Academic affiliations: AICTE; BCI; PCI
- Chancellor: Santosh Choubey
- Vice-Chancellor: S. K. Srivastava
- Academic staff: 100
- Administrative staff: 125
- Students: 2,500+
- Location: Hazaribagh, Jharkhand, India
- Campus: Urban
- Colors: Blue Orange Red
- Website: aisectuniversityjharkhand.ac.in

AISECT University is a private university located in Hazaribagh, Jharkhand, India. The university was established in 2016 by the AISECT Foundation through the AISECT University Act, 2016. It offers various diploma, undergraduate and postgraduate courses.

== Approvals ==
The university has full permission from these bodies (Government of India) to run the related courses.

- University Grants Commission (India)
- All India Council for Technical Education
- Bar Council of India
- Pharmacy Council of India
- Government of Jharkhand

== Faculties ==
The institute offers various diploma undergraduate and postgraduate courses through the following eight faculties.

- Agriculture
- Arts
- Commerce
- Computer Science and Information Technology
- Journalism and Mass Communication
- Management
- Science
- Pharmacy
- Yoga and Naturopathy
- Dancing

== See also ==
- Education in India
- University Grants Commission (India)
- List of private universities in India
- List of institutions of higher education in Jharkhand
