= Economy of Dhanbad =

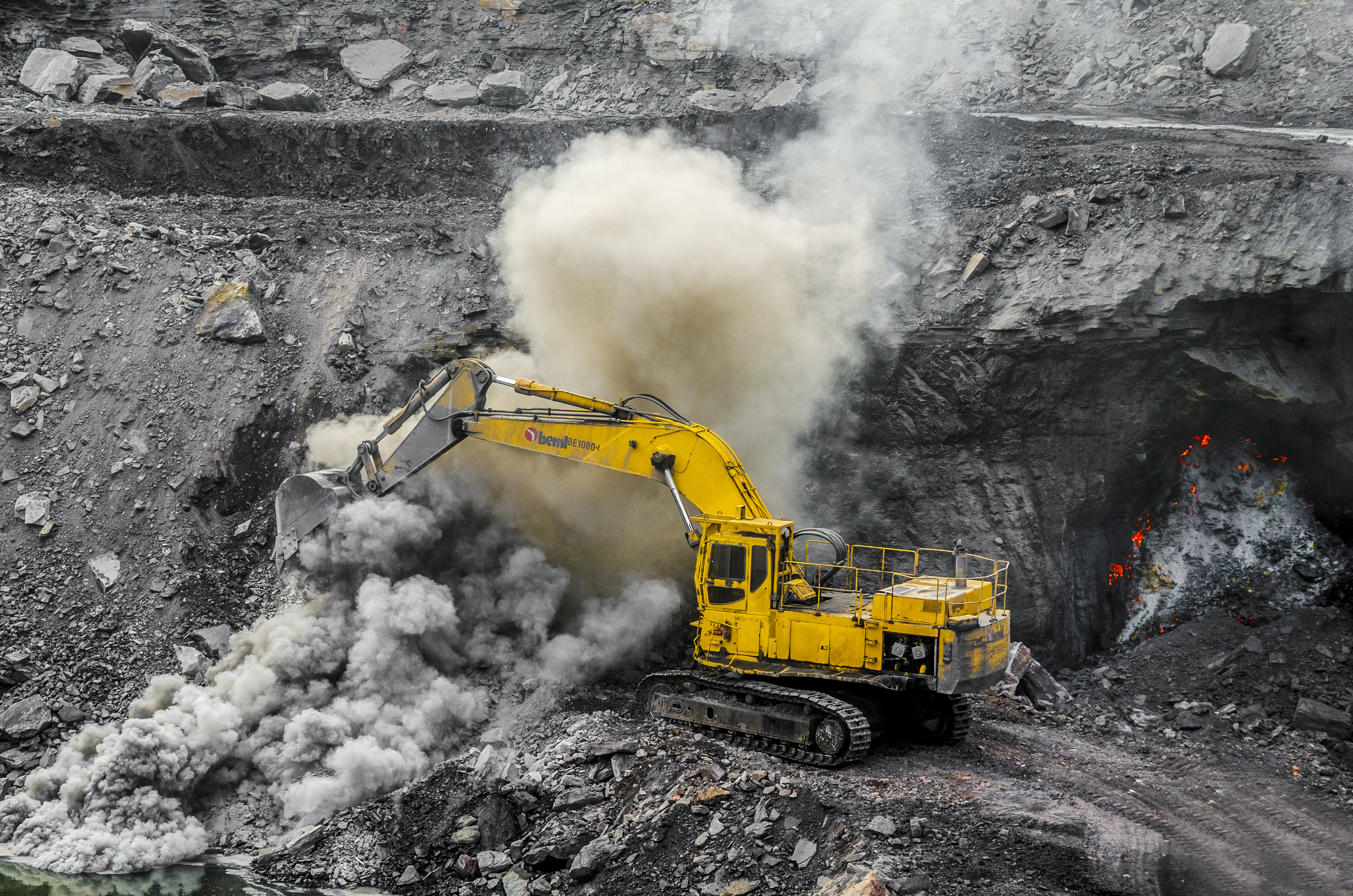
Open-cast mining in the outskirts of Dhanbad

Dhanbad is the second largest city in Jharkhand, India both by area and by population. Dhanbad has the largest economy in Jharkhand. It is 33rd in India by population. The economy of Dhanbad is primarily known for mining, utilities, retail, IT and cement industries. It is called "the coal capital of India".

== Mining ==
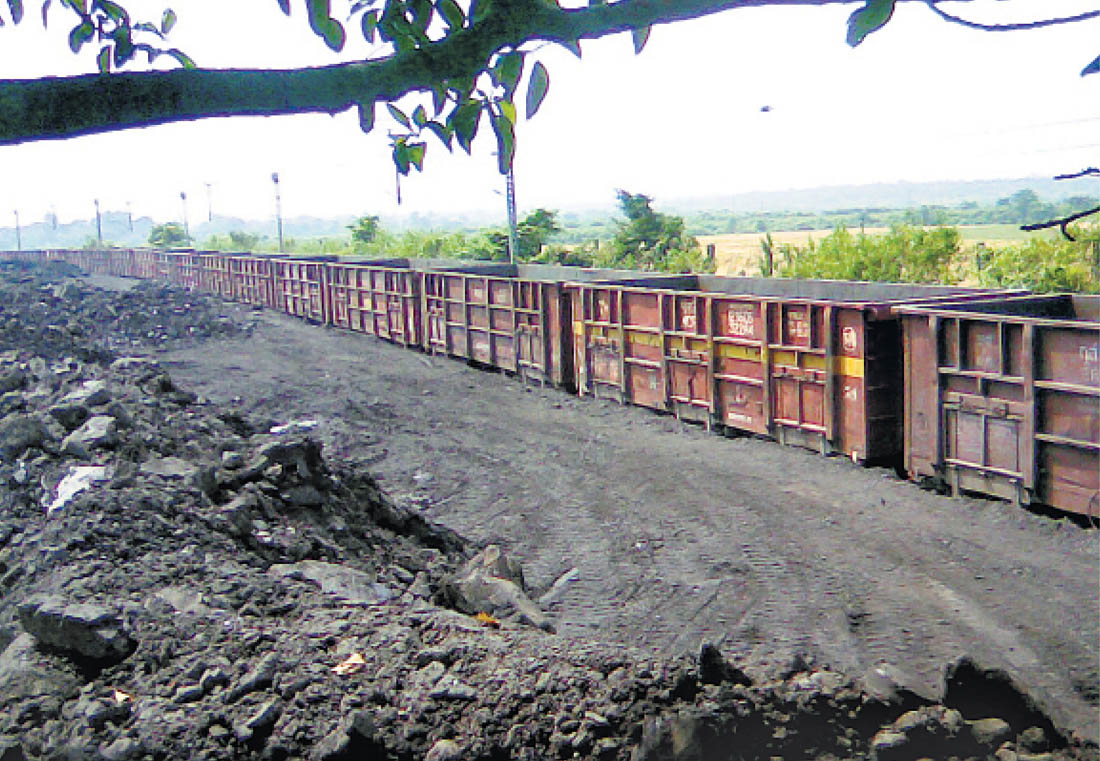
Dhanbad Coalfield

Dhanbad is rich in coal, which led to the foundation and opening of many coal companies in Dhanbad such as Central Coalfields and Bharat Coking Coal. Bharat Coking Coal's headquarters is in Dhanbad. In Dhanbad, there are 112 mines. All industry activity can be found all over the city of Dhanbad.

== Metals and cement ==
Hindusthan Malleables & Forgings Limited is a company in Dhanbad that manufactures graded, malleable, S.G. (ductile iron), manganese steel, and alloy steel castings. It is supported by a well-equipped pattern shop, fettling and grinding shop, heat treatment shop with bell and pit cycle annealing furnaces, machine shop, physical, chemical, and metallographic testing facilities, and a spectrometer for chemical analysis. The company has been awarded ISO 9001-2008 and ISO/TS 16949-2009. It has a branch in Bhuli, Dhanbad.

== Projects ==
Projects and Development India Limited, Hindustan Urvarak and Rasayan Ltd. Sindri and ACC Ltd. at Sindri have many projects in and across Dhanbad. Indian Railways is also a big employer in Dhanbad.

== Information technology ==
Software Technology Parks of India set up an IT park branch at Dhanbad. This IT park branch will house several information technology and business process outsourcing companies. It is near Birsa Institute of Technology Sindri. It was inaugurated by chief minister Hemant Soren. It was built at a cost of Rs 18.67 crore, the third site for the company in Jharkhand, the other two being in Ranchi and Jamshedpur.

== See also ==
- Economy of Bokaro
- Economy of Ranchi
- Economy of Deoghar
- Economy of Jamshedpur
- Economy of Giridih
- Economy of Jharkhand State
- Economy of India
