= Hazaribagh Lok Sabha constituency =

Lok Sabha constituency in Jharkhand

Coordinates: 23.99°N 85.36°E

Hazaribagh JH-14
- Lok Sabha constituency
- Interactive Map Outlining Hazaribagh Lok Sabha constituency

Constituency details
- Country: India
- Region: East India
- State: Jharkhand
- Assembly constituencies: Barhi; Barkagaon; Ramgarh; Mandu; Hazaribagh
- Established: 1952
- Reservation: None

Member of Parliament
- 18th Lok Sabha
- Incumbent Manish Jaiswal
- Party: BJP
- Alliance: NDA
- Elected year: 2024

Hazaribagh Lok Sabha constituency is one of the 14 Lok Sabha (parliamentary) constituencies in Jharkhand state in eastern India. This constituency covers the entire Ramgarh district and part of Hazaribagh district

== Assembly segments ==
Presently, Hazaribagh Lok Sabha constituency comprises the following five Vidhan Sabha (legislative assembly) segments:

#	Name	District	Member	Party	2024 Lead
21	Barhi	Hazaribagh	Manoj Yadav	BJP	BJP
22	Barkagaon	Hazaribagh	Roshan Lal Choudhary	BJP	BJP
23	Ramgarh	Hazaribagh	Mamta Devi	INC	BJP
24	Mandu	Ramgarh	Nirmal Mahto	AJSU	BJP
25	Hazaribagh	Ramgarh	Pradip Prasad	BJP	BJP

== Members of Parliament ==
Year	Member	Party
1952	Ram Narayan Singh	Chota Nagpur Santhal Parganas Janata Party
1957	Lalita Rajya Lakshmi	Chota Nagpur Santhal Parganas Janata Party
1962	Basant Narain Singh	Swatantra Party
1967	Basant Narain Singh	Independent
1968^	Mohan Singh Oberoi	Jharkhand Party
1971	Damodar Pandey	Indian National Congress
1977	Basant Narain Singh	Janata Party
1980	Basant Narain Singh	Janata Party
1984	Damodar Pandey	Indian National Congress
1989	Yadunath Pandey	Bharatiya Janata Party
1991	Bhubneshwar Prasad Mehta	Communist Party of India
1996	M. L. Vishwakarma	Bharatiya Janata Party
1998	Yashwant Sinha	Bharatiya Janata Party
1999	Yashwant Sinha	Bharatiya Janata Party
2004	Bhubneshwar Prasad Mehta	Communist Party of India
2009	Yashwant Sinha	Bharatiya Janata Party
2014	Jayant Sinha	Bharatiya Janata Party
2019	Jayant Sinha	Bharatiya Janata Party
2024	Manish Jaiswal	Bharatiya Janata Party

== Election results ==
=== 2024 ===
2024 Indian general election: Hazaribagh
Party	Candidate	Votes	%	±%
BJP	Manish Jaiswal	654,613	51.76	
INC	Jai Prakash Bhai Patel	3,77,927	29.88	
Independent	Sanjay Kumar Mehta	1,57,977	12.49	
CPI	Aniruddh Kumar	10,468	0.83	
BSP	Moinudin Ahmad	7,438	0.59	
NOTA	None of the above	7,200	0.57	
Majority		2,76,686	21.88	
Turnout		12,65,455	65.14	
BJP hold		Swing		

=== 2019 ===
2019 Indian general election: Hazaribagh
Party	Candidate	Votes	%	±%
BJP	Jayant Sinha	728,798	67.42	
INC	Gopal Prasad Sahu	2,49,250	23.06	
CPI	Bhubneshwar Prasad Mehta	32,109	2.97	
IND.	Moinuddin Ahmad	15,660	1.45	
IND.	Ramavtar Mahto	14,829	1.37	
None of the Above	None of the Above	7,539	0.70	
Majority		4,79,548	44.36	
Turnout		10,81,382	64.85	
Registered electors				
BJP hold		Swing		

=== 2014 ===
2014 Indian general election: Hazaribagh
Party	Candidate	Votes	%	±%
BJP	Jayant Sinha	4,06,931	42.08	
INC	Saurabh Narain Singh	2,47,803	25.62	
AJSU	Loknath Mahto	1,56,186	16.15	
JVM(P)	Arun Kumar Mishra	30,408	3.14	
Majority		1,59,128	16.45	
Turnout		9,67,348	63.69	
Registered electors				
BJP hold		Swing		

=== 2009 ===
2009 Indian general election: Hazaribagh
Party	Candidate	Votes	%	±%
BJP	Yashwant Sinha	2,19,810	31.81	
INC	Saurabh Narain Singh	1,79,646	26.00	
AJSU	Chandra Prakash Choudhary	86,880	12.57	
JMM	Shivlal Mahto	53,902	7.80	
CPI	Bhubneshwar Prasad Mehta	53,785	7.78	
JVM(P)	Braj Kishore Jaiswal	43,745	6.33	
Majority		40,164	5.81	
Turnout		6,90,943	53.08	
Registered electors				
BJP gain from CPI		Swing		

== See also ==
- Hazaribagh district
- Ramgarh district
- List of constituencies of the Lok Sabha
