= Rabindranath Tagore University, Bhopal =

Private university in Madhya Pradesh, India

Rabindranath Tagore University
- Other name: RNTU
- Former name: AISECT University
- Motto: Where aspirations become achievements.
- Type: Private university
- Established: 2010
- Founder: AISECT
- Accreditation: NAAC, NBA, UGC
- Affiliations: NIRF
- Academic affiliations: ACU, AICTE, AIU, AUAP, BCI, CCIM, COA, ICAR, INC, NCTE, PCI, WES
- Chancellor: Santosh Choubey
- Vice-Chancellor: Prof. (Dr.) R.P. Dubey
- Students: 5000+
- Undergraduates: 4000+
- Postgraduates: 1000+
- Doctoral students: 30+
- Other students: 500+
- Location: Raisen, Bhopal, Madhya Pradesh, India; 23.1343°N 77.5643°E
- Campus: Suburb
- Language: English, Hindi
- Colors: Black Blue Orange Red
- Sporting affiliations: NCC, NSS
- Mascot: Rabindranath Tagore
- Website: rntu.ac.in
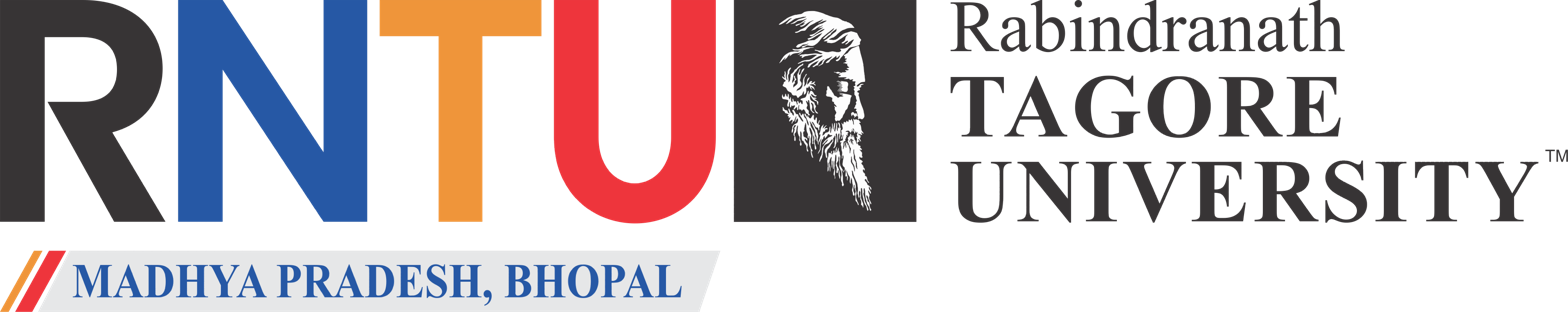

Rabindranath Tagore University (formerly known as AISECT University) is a premier private university established by All India Society for Electronics and Computer Technology (AISECT) in Mendua Village, Raisen District, Bhopal, Madhya Pradesh, India. Rabindranath Tagore University is recognized by University Grant Commission and Government of Madhya Pradesh.

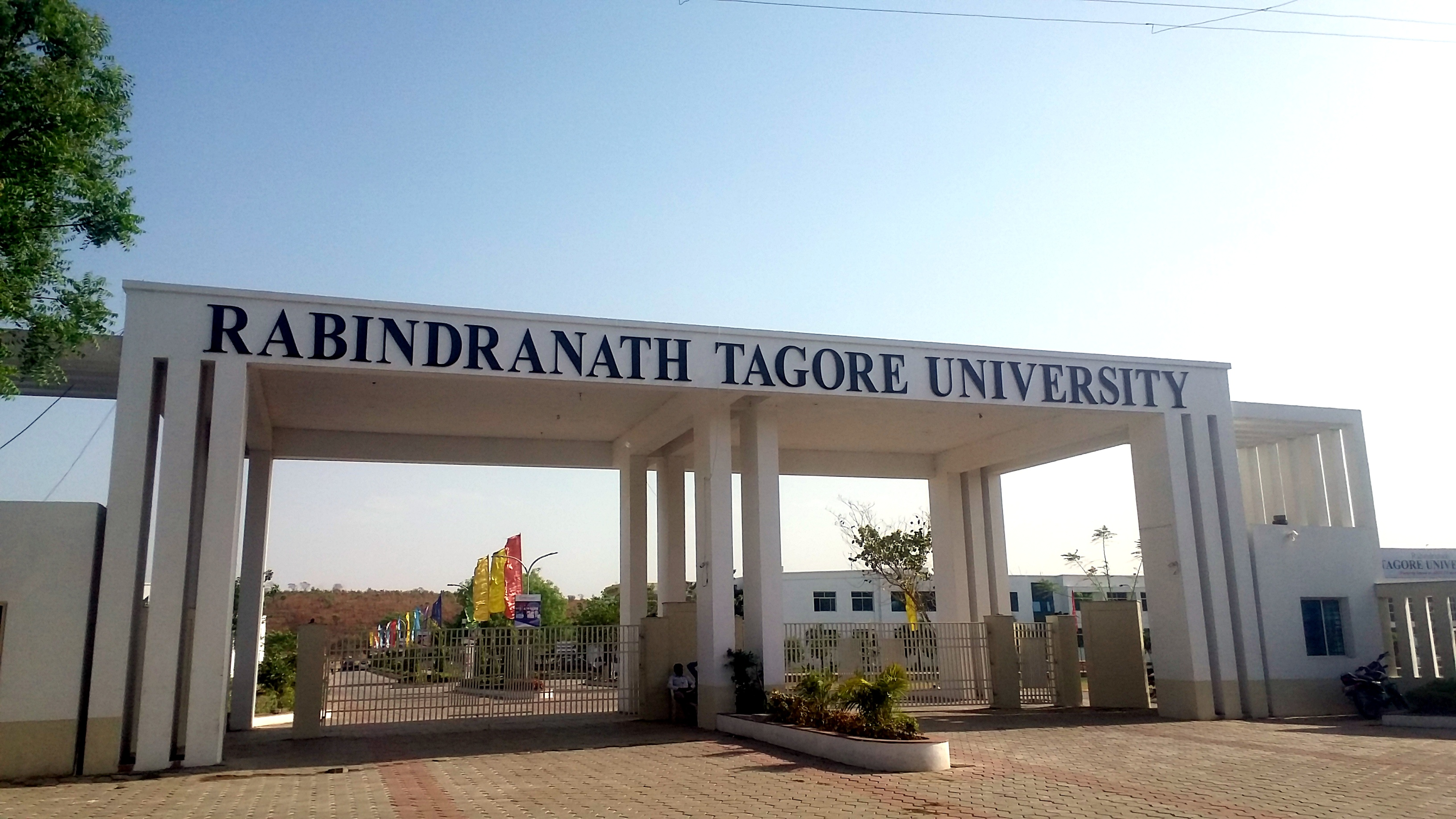
Main entrance of Rabindranath Tagore University

"The name commemorates Rabindranath Tagore (1861–1941), a celebrated Indian poet, writer, and philosopher. In 1913, he became the first Asian Nobel laureate when he was awarded the Nobel Prize in Literature."

== Campus ==
Rabindranath Tagore University is located on the outskirts of Bhopal, the city of lakes and the capital of India's central state of Madhya Pradesh. The university is about 15 km from the town and is built on a 50-acre self-contained campus, operating out of 15 spacious independent building blocks. The university has facilities for cricket, hockey, football, kabaddi, volleyball, table tennis, basketball and kho kho, accessible to students and faculty members. There is also a student healthcare centre within the campus, away from the academic and hostel blocks. The centre is attended by a full-time medical superintendent and part-time specialists in general medicine.

== Rankings ==
University rankings

Engineering – India
- NIRF (2024): 201-300

The National Institutional Ranking Framework (NIRF) ranked the university in 201-300 band in the engineering rankings in 2024.

== Recognition ==
=== Accreditation ===
- National Assessment and Accreditation Council
- National Board of Accreditation
- University Grant Commission

=== Affiliation ===
- National Institutional Ranking Framework

(The university is listed in the 101 - 150 rank band in the 2019, 2020 and 2021 rankings published by Ministry of Education)

=== Academic affiliations ===
- Association of Commonwealth Universities
- All India Council for Technical Education
- Association of Indian Universities
- Association of the Universities of Asia and the Pacific
- Bar Council of India
- Central Council of Indian Medicine
- Council of Architecture
- Indian Council of Agricultural Research
- Indian Nursing Council
- National Council for Teacher Education
- Pharmacy Council of India
- World Education Services

=== Sporting affiliations ===
- National Cadet Corps
- National Service Scheme

== Specialization ==
SrNo	Faculty Name	Program Name	
1	Engineering and Technology	Diploma in Engineering	
1	Engineering and Technology	Bachelor of Engineering (BE)	
1	Engineering and Technology	Master of Technology (MTech)	
2	Education	Diploma in Sports Coaching	
2	Education	Bachelor of Education (BEd)	
2	Education	Bachelor of Education (BEd) Part-time	
2	Education	Bachelor of Physical Education (BPEd)	
2	Education	Bachelor of Physical Education and Sports (BPES)	
2	Education	MA in (Education)	
2	Education	Masters in (Physical Education and Sports) (MPES)	
2	Education	Master of Education (MEd)	
2	Education	PG Diploma in (Sports Management) (PGDSM)	
2	Education	PG Diploma in Sports Coaching (PGDSC)	
3	Management	Diploma in (Tourism and Hospitality)	
3	Management	Bachelor of Business Administration (BBA)	
3	Management	Master of Business Administration (MBA)	
3	Management	PG Diploma in (Management)	
4	Computer Science and Information Technology	Diploma in Computer Applications (DCA)	
4	Computer Science and Information Technology	Bachelor of Science (BSc) in Data Science	
4	Computer Science and Information Technology	Bachelor of Science (BSc) in Computer Science, Information Technology	
4	Computer Science and Information Technology	Bachelor of Computer Application (BCA)	
4	Computer Science and Information Technology	Master of Science (MSc) in Information Technology	
4	Computer Science and Information Technology	Master of Science (MSc) in Computer Science	
4	Computer Science and Information Technology	Post Graduate Diploma in Computer Application (PGDCA)	
5	Law	Bachelor of Arts (BA) LLB	
5	Law	Bachelor of Laws (LLB)	
5	Law	Master of Laws (LLM)	
5	Law	PG Diploma in (law)	
6	Commerce	Bachelor of Commerce (B Com)	
6	Commerce	Master of Commerce (M Com)	
7	Nursing and Paramedical Science	Diploma in Medical Laboratory (DMLT)	
7	Nursing and Paramedical Science	BSc in (Yoga)	
7	Nursing and Paramedical Science	GNM	
7	Nursing and Paramedical Science	BSc in (Nursing)	
7	Nursing and Paramedical Science	Bachelor of Physiotherapy (BPT)	
7	Nursing and Paramedical Science	Bachelor in Medical Laboratory Technology (BMLT)	
7	Nursing and Paramedical Science	MSc in (Yoga)	
7	Nursing and Paramedical Science	Master of Physical Therapy (MPT)	
7	Nursing and Paramedical Science	Master of Public health (MPH)	
7	Nursing and Paramedical Science	PG Diploma in (Yoga)	
7	Nursing and Paramedical Science	Diploma in (Yoga)	
8	Humanities and Liberal Arts	Bachelor of Arts (BA)	
8	Humanities and Liberal Arts	Bachelor of Arts in Journalism and Mass Communication (MA JMC)	
8	Humanities and Liberal Arts	Bachelor of Social Work (BSW)	
8	Humanities and Liberal Arts	Master of Social Work (MSW)	
8	Humanities and Liberal Arts	Bachelor of Library Science (BLib)	
8	Humanities and Liberal Arts	Master of Library Science (MLib)	
8	Humanities and Liberal Arts	Diploma in (Dramatic Arts)	
8	Humanities and Liberal Arts	Master of Arts (MA)	
8	Humanities and Liberal Arts	Master of Arts in Journalism and Mass Communication (MA JMC)	
8	Humanities and Liberal Arts	PG Diploma in Journalism and Mass Communication	
9	Science	Diploma in Forensic Science	
9	Science	Bachelor of Science (BSc) in Core Subjects	
9	Science	Bachelor of Science (BSc) in Forensic Science	
9	Science	Bachelor of Science (BSc) in Microbiology, Biotechnology	
9	Science	Master of Science (MSc)	
10	Agriculture	Bachelor of Science (BSc Honours) in Agriculture	
10	Agriculture	Masters of Science (MSc) in Agriculture	
11	Vocational	Bachelor of Vocation (B Voc) Master of Vocation (M Voc)	Trades: (Agriculture, Electronics, Construction, Food Processing, Green Jobs, Life Science, Information technology, Computer Application, Handloom and Textiles, Tourism and Hospitality, Automobile, Banking and Finance, Retail Management, Health Care, Telecom, Earthmoving, Plumbing, Mining)
