= Jayant Sinha =

Indian politician (born 1963)

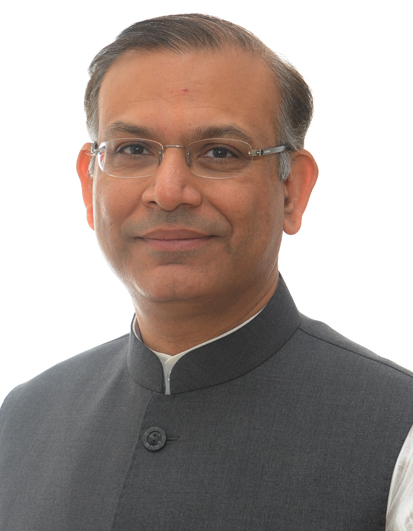
- Sinha in November 2014

Union Minister of State for Civil Aviation
- In office 5 July 2016 – 30 May 2019
- Minister: Ashok Gajapathi Raju Pusapati (till 2018); Suresh Prabhu (from 2018)
- Preceded by: Mahesh Sharma
- Succeeded by: Hardeep Singh Puri (as MoS independent charge)

Union Minister of State for Finance
- In office 9 November 2014 – 5 July 2016
- Minister: Arun Jaitley
- Preceded by: Nirmala Sitharaman
- Succeeded by: Arjun Ram Meghwal; Santosh Gangwar

Member of Parliament, Lok Sabha
- In office 16 May 2014 – 4 June 2024
- Preceded by: Yashwant Sinha
- Succeeded by: Manish Jaiswal
- Constituency: Hazaribagh, Jharkhand

Personal details
- Born: 21 April 1963 (age 63) Giridih, Bihar, India (present-day Jharkhand)
- Party: Bharatiya Janata Party
- Spouse: Punita Kumar Sinha (m. 1986)
- Children: 2
- Parent: Yashwant Sinha (father)
- Education: IIT Delhi (BTech); University of Pennsylvania (MS); Harvard Business School (MBA)
- Occupation: Politician; businessperson

Jayant Sinha (born 21 April 1963; Hindi pronunciation: [d͡ʒəjən̪t̪ sɪn̪ɦaː]) is an Indian politician and a former Union Minister of State for Finance and Union Minister of State for Civil Aviation in the Government of India, and served as the Chairperson of the Standing Committee on Finance and as a member of the Public Accounts Committee from 2019 to 2024. He served as the Member of Parliament (Lok Sabha) for Hazaribagh from 2014 to 2024. He is currently the President of Everstone Group and Eversource Capital, and a Visiting Professor at the London School of Economics (LSE). He is also a Distinguished Fellow at the Observer Research Foundation (ORF) and a Senior Advisor at the Indian Venture Capital Association. He has worked as an investment fund manager and management consultant.

In May 2014, he was elected to the Lok Sabha as a Member of Parliament, representing the Bharatiya Janata Party from the Hazaribagh Parliamentary constituency in Jharkhand. In the 2019 general election, Sinha was re-elected as Member of Parliament from the same constituency with a record majority.

During his time as a two-term Member of Parliament, Sinha represented over 3 million people in a region with a significant coal-mining economy and persistent development needs. During his tenure, he worked on various infrastructure improvements, including upgrading transportation systems, enhancing healthcare and educational facilities, and supporting initiatives like the Akshaya Patra food program.

Before entering public office, Sinha worked as a management consultant and investment professional. He spent twelve years at McKinsey & Company as a Partner in the Boston and Delhi offices, where he co-led the global Software and IT Services practice. He later served as a Managing Director at Courage Capital Management. Until 2013, he was a Partner at Omidyar Network and the Managing Director of Omidyar Network India Advisors, where he led overall investment strategy and operations in India.

== Personal life ==
He was born in a Chitraguptvanshi Kayastha family in Giridih, Jharkhand, where his father, Yashwant Sinha, was stationed as an IAS officer. In his youth, Jayant lived in Bihar, Delhi and Germany. He was educated at St. Michael's High School, Patna and St. Columba's School, Delhi. In 1980, Jayant passed the JEE while in the 11th grade on his first attempt, and was admitted to Indian Institute of Technology Delhi. He was awarded the IIT Delhi's Distinguished Alumni Award in October 2015. While at IIT, Sinha met his future wife Punita, and they were married in 1986. They have two sons.

After graduating from IIT Delhi in 1985, Sinha enrolled at the University of Pennsylvania, and completed a Master of Science in Energy Management & Policy in 1986. Later, Sinha also attended Harvard Business School, and obtained an MBA with Distinction in 1992.

== Political career ==
Jayant Sinha has participated in Indian politics and policy-making since the 1990s. When his father became Finance Minister under Atal Bihari Vajpayee (1998-2002), Sinha provided policy inputs on several new initiatives such as the mortgage interest tax deduction and the Saral form to file income tax returns with ease and improve tax compliance.

Sinha has been active in Hazaribagh, assisting his father's election campaigns since 1998. He has also worked on a variety of projects in Hazaribagh and Ramgarh districts such as fostering self-help groups, distributing solar lanterns, improving drinking water quality, and getting village roads built.

During the 2014 election campaign, Sinha worked with Prime Minister Narendra Modi to help frame national economic policy, including organizing and hosting an international business leaders' forum with Mr. Modi in February 2014. Sinha has been an active contributor to the BJP's efforts to develop new campaign management technologies and systems.

In 2014, Sinha contested Lok Sabha elections from the Hazaribagh seat in his home state of Jharkhand. He won the elections with a huge margin of 1,59,128 votes, getting a total of 4,06,931 in his favour. After joining parliament, Sinha was a member of four parliamentary committees - Public Accounts Committee, Standing Committee on Finance and Subordinate Committee on Legislation and of the Consultative Committee for the Ministry of Communications and Information Technology.

In 2019, Sinha contested for the second time from Hazaribagh constituency and registered 728,798 votes out of the 1,070,929 votes cast.

In the lead-up to the 2024 Lok Sabha elections, BJP MP Jayant Sinha announced his decision to step back from direct electoral duties to concentrate on combating global climate change. While Sinha remains dedicated to working with the party on economic and governance issues, he expressed deep gratitude for the opportunities he has had over the past decade, serving the people of Bharat and Hazaribagh. Sinha also acknowledged the support he received from Prime Minister Narendra Modi, Home Minister Amit Shah, and the BJP leadership.

From 2019 to 2024, Sinha served as the Chairperson of the Standing Committee on Finance, where he led the 31-member Parliamentary panel that had oversight of the Ministries of Finance, Corporate Affairs, Statistics & Program Implementation, and the NITI Aayog. The panel also had parliamentary responsibility for the Reserve Bank of India, the Securities and Exchange Board of India, the Insolvency and Bankruptcy Board of India, and the Insurance and Pension regulators.

Sinha introduced India’s first net zero legislation as a private bill in Parliament in 2021. He has also pioneered research on the economic, public health, and national security impact of net zero development for India.

== Ministerial career ==
=== Ministry of Finance ===
Sinha was sworn in as Minister of State in the Union Council of Ministers on 9 November 2014. Subsequently, he assumed charge at the Ministry of Finance in the Indian Government, working with Finance Minister Arun Jaitley. There, he helped in driving initiatives such as PM Mudra Yojana, Social Security Platform, devising the Indradhanush package for public sector banks, launching the India Aspiration Fund to promote entrepreneurship, and strengthening India's capital markets. Legislation he was involved with included the Insurance Bill, Bankruptcy Bill, Negotiable Instruments Act and Regional Rural Banks Bill in the Parliament. He also helped in preparing the Union Budgets of 2015-16 and 2016–17.

=== Ministry of Civil Aviation ===
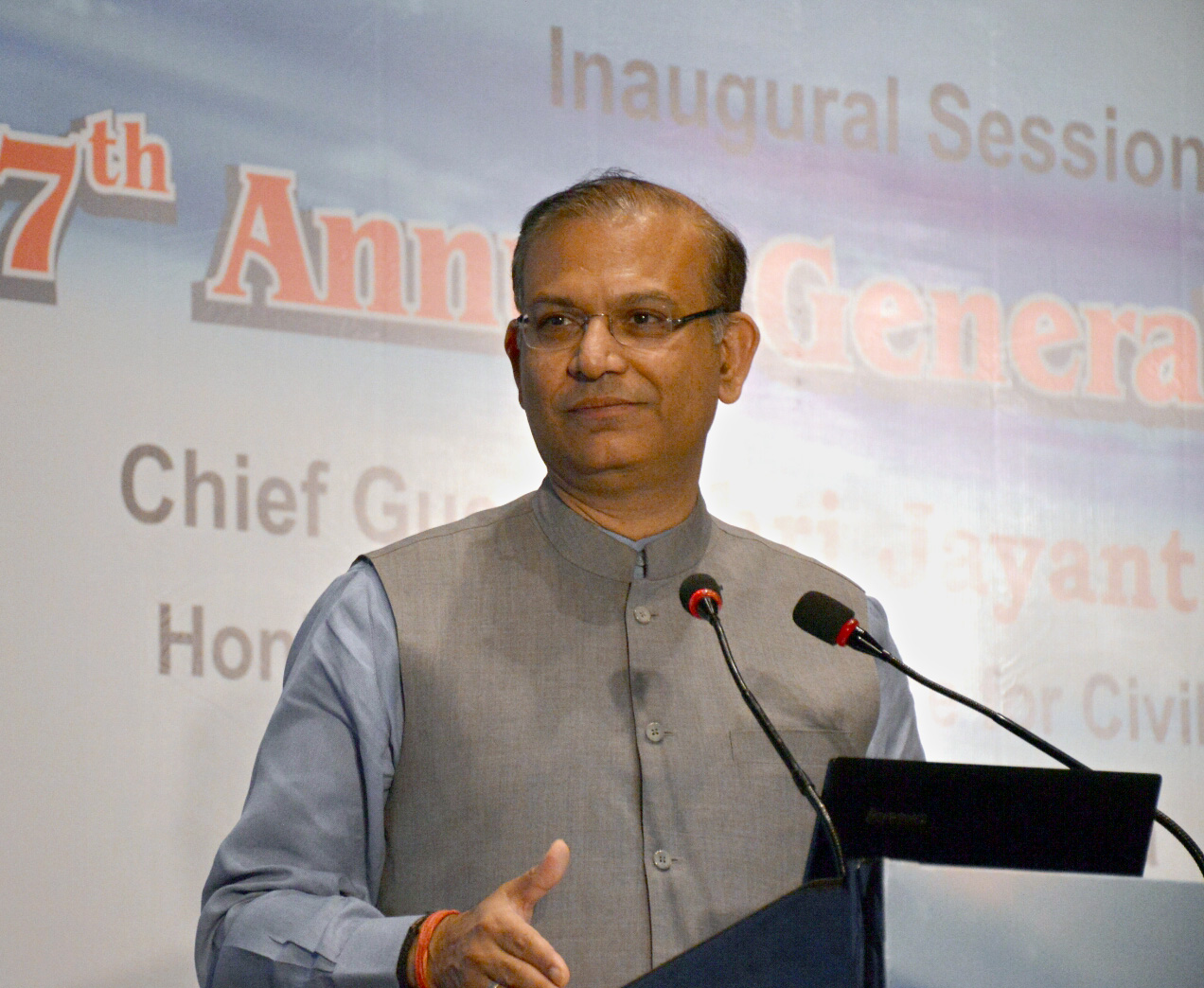
Sinha, as Minister of State for Civil Aviation, addressing the inaugural session of the 187th Annual General Meeting of Calcutta Chamber of Commerce, October 01, 2018.

After the Ministry of Finance, Sinha moved to the Ministry of Civil Aviation on 6 July 2016. His appointment came just after the government unveiled the first-ever National Civil Aviation Policy (NCAP). His work in the Ministry of Civil Aviation has been widely appreciated and has led to the complete transformation of India's aviation ecosystem.

The Regional Connectivity Scheme was formulated under Sinha's guidance and is the flagship scheme of the NCAP. On 27 April 2017, PM Narendra Modi launched the Regional Connectivity Scheme UDAN (Ude Desh ka Aam Nagrik) scheme from the Jubbarhatti airport in Shimla. At the launch of the scheme, Mr Sinha said the citizens would reap the benefit of development of remote areas, enhance trade and commerce and more tourism expansion. UDAN has already added more than 35 airports to the existing 70 operational airports thus dramatically expanding the Indian aviation network and bringing air travel to Tier 2 and 3 cities such as Bikaner, Adhampur, and Kanpur. UDAN operates at three levels to ensure route profitability: reducing operating costs as much as possible, providing a market discovered subsidy for half the seats and guaranteeing a three-year exclusivity on routes. The second bidding round (UDAN 2) prioritized helicopters leading to bids for more than 50 heliports in hilly areas and islands. The focus in UDAN 3 is on tourism destinations such as Kajuraho and on international routes for cities such as Guwahati.

Sinha worked with security and customs agencies to reduce the use of unnecessary forms, eliminate baggage stamping, and enable e-boarding. Sinha developed the AirSewa grievance redressal and flight information mobile app. With this app, air passengers can register their complaints about any member of the aviation ecosystem including airlines, airports, security, immigration, or customs. Passengers get an acknowledgement of their complaint and the government monitors satisfactory closure of their complaint. The AirSewa concept originated from his handling of passenger grievances on various social media channels. Under his leadership, a Passenger Charter has been released to strengthen and formalize passenger rights. A safety-oriented National No-Fly list has been formulated to prevent unruly behaviour during flights.

Sinha led the preparation of the NABH (Next Gen Airports for BHarat) Nirmaan program which was announced in Budget FY 18-19 and aims to strengthen airport infrastructure for a billion passenger trips. This would represent a five-fold capacity increase from the approximately 200 million trips in FY 17–18. He has been instrumental in introducing a revised public-private-partnership model for airport privatization and six airports have been offered for PPP. As part of the NABH Nirmaan program, over $15 billion of airport investments are currently underway in India. To ensure that Indian airports reflect local art and culture, Sinha worked with the Airports Authority of India to constitute a Design Council comprising India's top architects and artists. The Design Council provides a Design Brief incorporating a strong ‘sense of place’ for the design of airport terminals.

Sinha also played a role in conceptualising the framework for the strategic privatization of Air India including the creation of an SPV structure to manage Air India's non-core assets. Sinha has also worked with the Air India Board to formulate the MaharajahDirect strategy for Air India to become a competitive global airline.

Sinha led the formulation of the DigiYatra technology standards which utilizes facial recognition to verify passenger identities at airports. DigiYatra was implemented in Bengaluru airport in January 2019 and several AAI airports in March 2019. Sinha chairs the Drone Task Force and led the efforts to introduce India's world-leading drone regulations, which are based on his DigitalSky framework. The next set of drone regulations are intended to expand drone usage to cross the Beyond Visual Line of Sight (BVLOS), payload, and automation thresholds. The DigitalSky framework went live on 1 December 2018. The goal of the Drone Task Force is to ensure that India becomes a world leader in the design, manufacture, and safe usage of drones.

In October 2016 Jayant Sinha signed an MoU between the Ministry of Civil Aviation and the Ministry of Skill Development and Entrepreneurship for training of people in the various trades associated with the civil aviation sector to meet the potential of 60 lakh jobs in the next ten years. Later on 28 February 2017, MoS for Civil Aviation Jayant Sinha inaugurated India's first ever integrated heliport in Rohini, New Delhi along with the then Union Minister for Civil Aviation Ashok Gajapathi Raju.

In September 2018 Jayant Sinha announced the digital sky policy that will enable the government of India to digitise the entire sky and control the drone ecosystem. This policy under the tenure of Jayant Sinha was in two phases. In the first phase, the platform will register pilots, devices and services providers. The second phase will include automation, bi-modal control and setting up of dedicated air corridors. Jayant Sinha Minister of State for Civil Aviation added that once we digitise the sky, we will be able to give people rights to use certain slices of it for some period of time. Industry experts believed that the policy has broken new ground with digital sky platform and NPNT (no permission, no take-off).

== Development of Hazaribagh ==
On 23 February 2017 MP from Hazaribagh Jayant Sinha laid the foundation stone for three medical colleges in Dumka, Palamau and Hazaribagh along with the Chief Minister of Jharkhand Mr. Raghubar Das.

== Professional career ==
After his graduation from Harvard Business School, Sinha joined McKinsey & Company in Boston, and was elected Partner in 1999. At McKinsey, Sinha co‐led the Global Software & IT Services Practice. Sinha returned to India in 2002 with McKinsey, before leaving to join Courage Capital, a global special- situations hedge fund, to lead their India tech and investing efforts. At Courage Capital, he led Global Technology and India-related investing for a billion-dollar global special situations hedge fund.

After Courage Capital, Sinha joined Omidyar Network, founded by Pam and Pierre Omidyar. Till December 2013, he was a partner at ON and the managing director of Omidyar Network India Advisors. He also served on Omidyar Network's five - member global executive committee. During his time there, Omidyar's India portfolio grew to over 35 companies and organizations totaling investments worth over $100 million. At Omidyar, Sinha made venture capital investments in a variety of companies of which three went on to become unicorns: DailyHunt, Quikr, and Tata1mg. Several others were semi-unicorns including d.light, Aspiring Minds, Neogrowth, Vistaar Finance, and HealthKart. He also helped in funding the Indian Impact Investing Council.

Sinha has served on the boards of several companies and organizations, including Daily Hunt, d.light, iMerit and Janaagraha. He was invited to serve on the International Advisory Board of the International Finance Corporation, Washington DC.

== In the media ==
Sinha was recognized as the Best Lok Sabha MP of the Year 2021 while the Standing Committee on Finance was awarded the Best Parliamentary Committee in 2022, 2023, and 2024. Based on his five year record, he was awarded as a top Parliamentarian by the President of India.

Sinha has been quoted in the global media for his views on business and economic policy, including in The Economist, the Wall Street Journal, Business Week, the New York Times, CNN, Bloomberg, and CNBC. His essays and op-eds have been published in several major publications, including the Harvard Business Review and the Financial Times.

== Controversy ==
In 2018, Jayant Sinha found himself at the center of a controversy when he was allegedly seen garlanding individuals convicted by a Fast-Track Court in connection with a lynching case. The case, which had drawn significant public attention, involved the tragic death of a Muslim man. Sinha's actions were interpreted by some as supportive of the convicts, leading to public criticism, including from his father, Yashwant Sinha.

However, Sinha clarified his position through multiple statements and a series of tweets, emphasizing that his actions were misunderstood. He strongly condemned all forms of violence and vigilantism, reaffirming his belief in the rule of law. Sinha highlighted that his intention was never to condone any unlawful behavior but to ensure that justice was served fairly. He expressed deep regret if his actions were misinterpreted as support for vigilantism.

Sinha's involvement in the case began in April 2018, after the Fast-Track Court sentenced the accused to life imprisonment. Concerned about the legal process, Sinha and local BJP leaders facilitated legal assistance for the convicts, who were later granted bail by the Hon'ble Ranchi High Court. The High Court, in its order, noted a lack of specific evidence against the accused and thus released them on bail.

Through media interviews and public statements, Sinha emphasized that his efforts were aimed at ensuring justice for all, seeking to prevent wrongful punishment of the innocent while also holding the guilty accountable.

Sinha never met with the family of the victims of the mob lynching even though they were just constituents. His efforts were focused exclusively on the helping the accused.
