= Hazaribagh Brahmo Samaj =

- Location within Jharkhand Location within India

Religion
- Affiliation: Brahmoism
- Deity: None
- Festivals: Maghotsab, Bhadrotsab

Location
- Location: Hazaribag
- State: Jharkhand
- Country: India
- Interactive map of Hazaribagh Brahmo Samaj
- Coordinates: 23.995321°N 85.355010°E

Architecture
- Completed: 1867

Hazaribagh Brahmo Samaj was established in 1867 on a piece of land donated by Rai Bahadur Jadunath Mukherjee.

Brahmo Samaj is a monotheistic reform movement. The religious reforms of Raja Rammohan Roy contained in some beliefs of the Brahmo Samaj expounded by Rajnarayan Basu are:

- Brahmo Samaj believes that the most fundamental doctrines of Brahmoism are at the basis of every religion followed by a man.
- Brahmo Samaj believes in the existence of One Supreme God—"God, endowed with a distinct personality & moral attributes equal to His nature, and intelligence befitting the Author and Preserver of the Universe," and worship Him alone.
- Brahmo Samaj believes that worship of Him needs no fixed place or time. "We can adore Him at any time and at any place, provided that time and that place are calculated to compose and direct the mind towards Him."
- All men are children of the 'one God of all human beings', and therefore equal.

Having studied the Qur’an, the Vedas and the Upanishads, Roy's beliefs were derived from a combination of monastic elements of Hinduism, Islam, eighteenth-century Deism, Unitarianism, and the ideas of the Freemasons.

Maghotsav, the main festival of the Brahmos is celebrated on the 11th of Magh each year according to the Bengali calendar to mark the anniversary of Brahmo Samaj. The celebration commemorates the inauguration of the first Brahmo Samaj by Raja Rammohun Roy on 23 January 1830, which was the 11th Magh according to the Bengali calendar.

Hazaribagh Brahmo Samaj operates a charitable homeopathic dispensary.

In August 1874, Keshub Chunder Sen went to Hazaribagh to recoup his health. He stayed there for three weeks. He observed Bhadrotsab there. While at Hazaribagh he wrote a Bengali booklet ‘Sukhi Parivar’ (Happy Family).
