= Hazaribag College of Dental Sciences and Hospital =

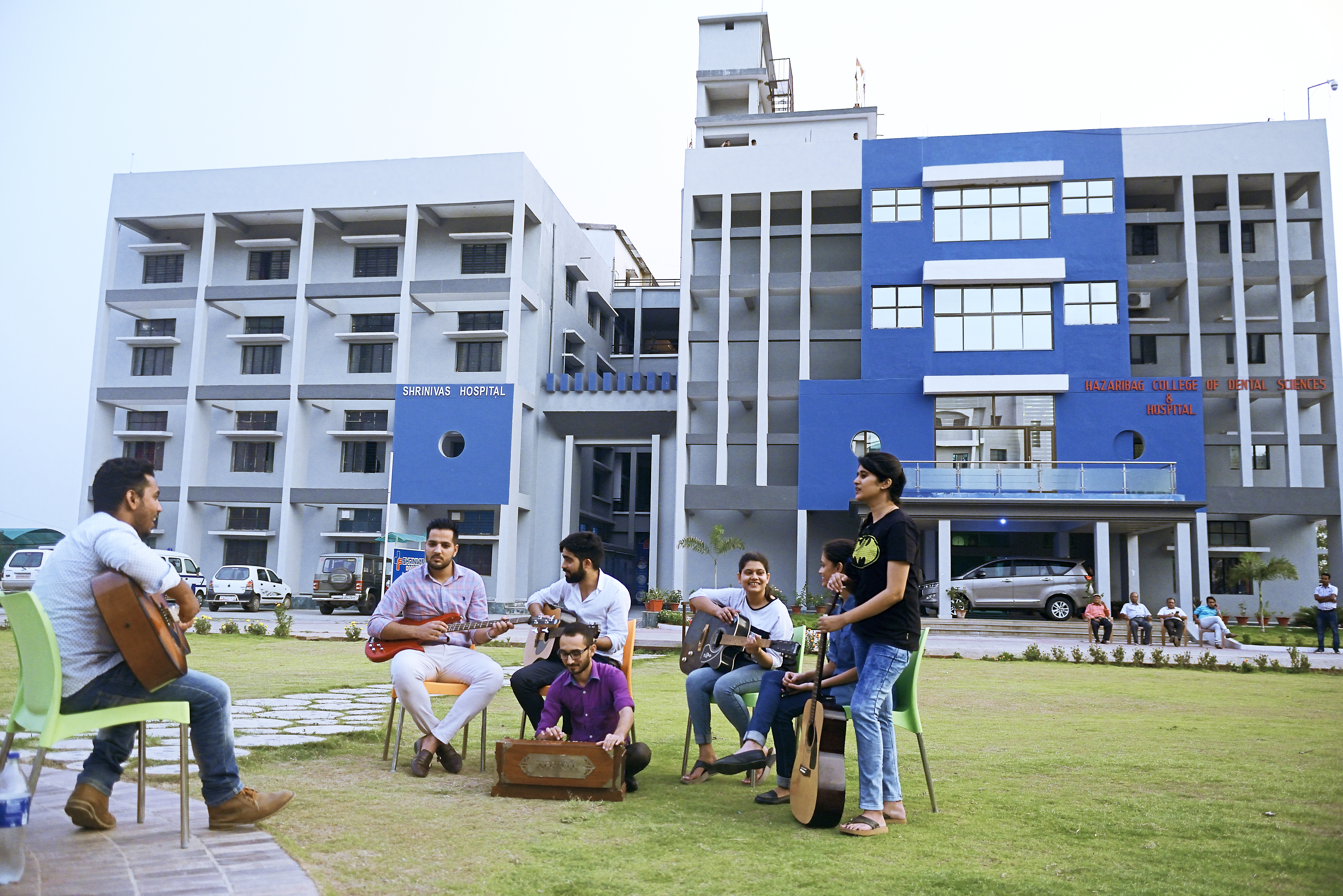
- Type: Private dental college
- Established: 2007; 19 years ago
- Affiliations: Vinoba Bhave University; DCI
- Chairman: Shrinivas Prasad
- Principal: Dr. K. Sri Krishna
- Location: Hazaribag, Jharkhand, India; 23.926°N 85.381°E
- Campus: Urban
- Website: hcdsh.edu.in

Hazaribag College of Dental Sciences and Hospital (HCDSH) is a private dental college located in Hazaribag, in the Indian state of Jharkhand. It is affiliated with the Vinoba Bhave University and is recognised by Dental Council of India. It offers Bachelor of Dental Science (BDS) and Master of Dental Science (MDS) courses.
