= St. Xavier's School, Hazaribagh =

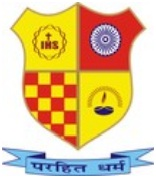

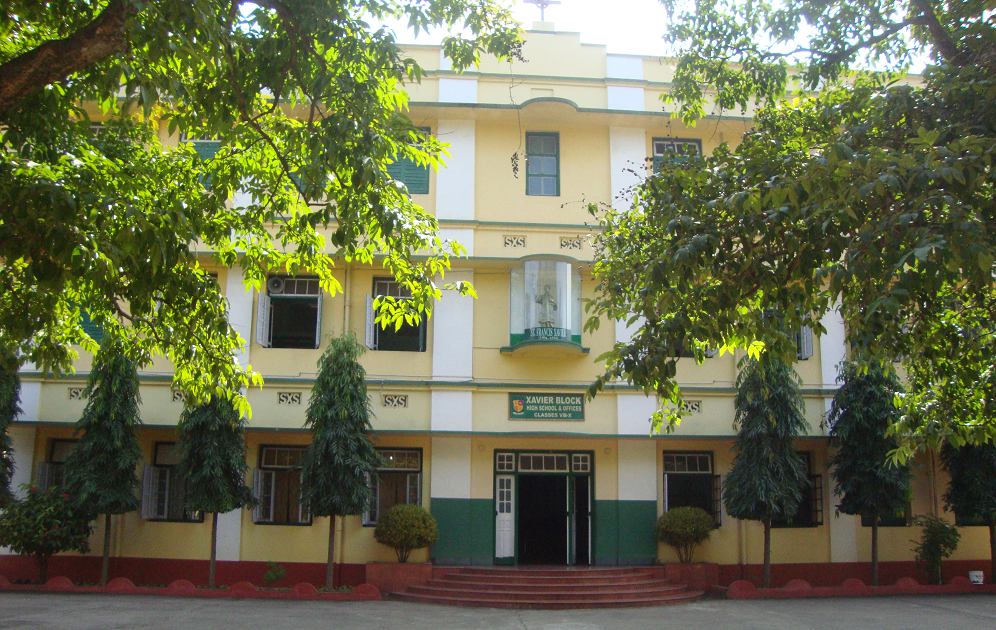
- School Logo

Location
- Hazaribagh, Jharkhand); Jharkhand; India
- 24°00′04″N 85°22′05″E

Information
- Type: Private primary and secondary school; Christian minority school
- Motto: Inveritate et Caritate, Parhit Dharm
- Religious affiliation: Catholicism
- Denomination: Jesuits
- Established: 1952; 74 years ago
- Founder: Fr. John Moore S.J; Australian Jesuits
- Principal: Fr. Rosner Xaxlo, SJ
- Gender: Boys only (1952-1995); Co-educational (since 1995)
- Enrollment: 1,700
- Campus: Urban
- Campus size: 33 acres (13 ha)
- Website: Website

St. Xavier's School, Hazaribagh is a private Catholic primary and secondary school located in Hazaribagh, Jharkhand (formerly Bihar). The co-educational Christian minority school was founded in 1952 by an Australian Jesuit missionary and is now owned and operated by the Hazaribagh Society of Jesus.

== History ==
The school was established in 1952 by the Australian Jesuit missionary Rev. Fr. John Moore S.J. He was then 32 years old and later went on to win the National Teachers Award.

In its initial years, the school was linked to Loyola School, Jamshedpur. This school was considered the best educational institution of eastern India during 1960s-70s. The first batch of pupils sat for the University of Cambridge Oversea School Certificate examination at Hazaribagh in 1958. The school was all-boys until 1995 when it became co-educational. After 1997 the school affiliated with the CBSE school board and prepared students for both 10th and 12th level examinations.

The school has a sprawling campus of 33 acres (13 ha) with lush green grounds and parks. The built-up area is divided into blocks, Junior School, Middle School, and Senior School. Balmoral field is the football grounds and hosts the annual soccer competition, named in honour of Fr. John Moore, that attracts teams from throughout Jharkhand. On occasion of the school's Diamond Jubilee, the school built a high-class auditorium named Magis costing about 20 crores rupees under the leadership of Dr (Fr) Peter James S.J., a former principal. The school's infrastructure was renewed under the tenure of Fr James with a lot of positive changes.

== Alumni ==
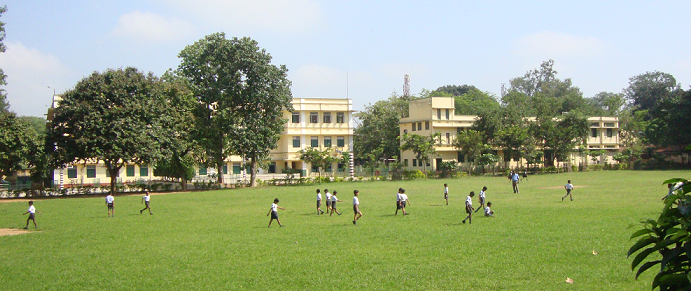
Playing fields at St. Xavier's School, Hazaribagh.

Hazaribagh Old Xaverians Association (HOXA) is the official alumni organization for the school. It organized a Golden Jubilee celebration in 2008 with alumni gatherings at Hazaribagh, Calcutta, Delhi, Chennai, and Pune.

In January 2012 the school had a Diamond Jubilee (60 years) celebration that led to a new website. The HOXA website includes a class-wise listing of over 7000 alumni who have appeared for the school boards since 1955; thousands of photos in multiple albums, including those related to HOXA reunions; a collection of old and current school magazines and newsletters; audio and video material. Of special note is its video documenting the history of the school. The website attracts over 1650 active users, including current and past teachers, and has a message center that allows all to interact.

== Notable Hoxans ==
Diplomats and Bureaucrats

- A. Gitesh Sarma, Former Indian diplomat.
- Ramesh Thakur, Former Assistant-Secretary General of United Nations.
- P. K. Thakur, Former DGP of Bihar Police.
- Anshuman Gaur, current Indian Ambassador to Hungary.

Film Industry

- Raj Kumar Gupta, Indian film Director.
- Kaushik Ghatak, Indian film Director.
- Amit Kumar, Indian playback singer and musician.
- Abir Goswami, Indian Actor.
- Sanjay Routray, Indian film producer, founder and director of Matchbox Shots.

Politicians

- Devesh Chandra Thakur, Member of Parliament in 18th Lok Sabha representing Sitamarhi Lok Sabha constituency, Former Chairman and Member of Bihar Legislative Council from Tirhut graduate constituency and Former Cabinet Minister of Bihar.

Law

- Tapen Sen, Former judge of Calcutta High Court.

Activist

- Bulu Imam, Padma Shree Awardee.

Entrepreneurs

- Anurag Katriar, Former president of National Restaurant Association of India (NRAI).
- Sanjeev Barnwal, Co-founder and CTO of Meesho.
