= Rabodh =

Coordinates: 23°44′N 85°26′E

Rabodh is a village in Churchu Tehsil, Hazaribagh District, Jharkhand State, India. Rabodh is 21.9 km distance from its Tehsil Main Town Churchu. Rabodh is 30.1 km distance from its District main City Hazaribagh and 45 km distance from its State Main City Ranchi.

Other nearby villages are Ango, Bahera, Balsagra, Bedam, Chanaro and Dadi .

Rabodh's Pin Code is 825330.

Rabodh village is in an area with coal fields.
