= Yashwant Sinha =

Indian politician (born 1937)

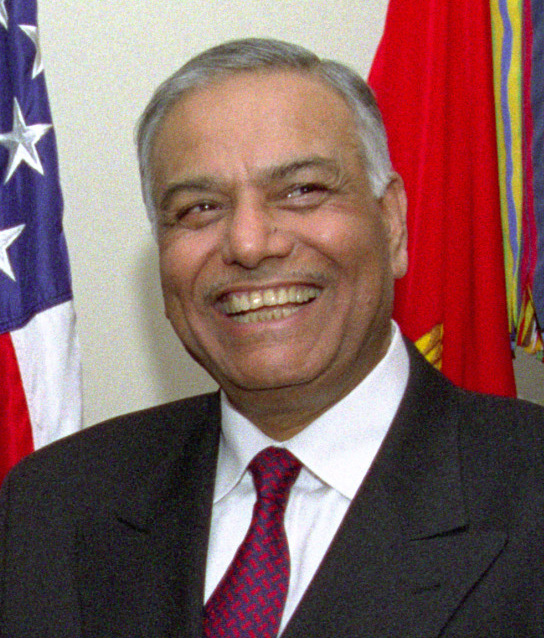
- Sinha as External Affairs Minister

President of Atal Vichar Manch
- Incumbent
- Assumed office 2024

Vice President of All India Trinamool Congress
- In office 15 March 2021 – 2022
- President: Mamata Banerjee

Union Minister of External Affairs
- In office 1 July 2002 – 22 May 2004
- Prime Minister: Atal Bihari Vajpayee
- Preceded by: Jaswant Singh
- Succeeded by: Natwar Singh

Union Minister of Finance
- In office 5 December 1998 – 1 July 2002
- Prime Minister: Atal Bihari Vajpayee
- Preceded by: P. Chidambaram
- Succeeded by: Jaswant Singh
- In office 10 November 1990 – 5 June 1991
- Prime Minister: Chandra Shekhar
- Preceded by: Madhu Dandavate
- Succeeded by: Manmohan Singh

Member of Parliament, Lok Sabha
- In office 22 May 2009 – 16 May 2014
- Preceded by: Bhubneshwar Prasad Mehta
- Succeeded by: Jayant Sinha
- Constituency: Hazaribagh, Jharkhand
- In office 13 March 1998 – 22 May 2004
- Preceded by: M. L. Vishwakarma
- Succeeded by: Bhubneshwar Prasad Mehta
- Constituency: Hazaribagh, Jharkhand

Member of Parliament, Rajya Sabha
- In office 8 July 2004 – 16 May 2009
- Constituency: Jharkhand
- In office 3 April 1988 – 14 November 1993
- Constituency: Bihar

Personal details
- Born: 6 November 1937 (age 88) Patna, Bihar Province, British Raj
- Party: Atal Vichar Manch (2022–)
- Other political affiliations: Janata Dal (1988–1991); Bharatiya Janata Party (1992–2018); Bhartiya Sab Log Party (2020–2021); Trinamool Congress (2021–2022)
- Spouse: Nilima Sinha (m. 1961)
- Children: Jayant; Sumant; Sharmila
- Education: Patna Collegiate School; Patna University
- Occupation: Bureaucrat; politician; administrator
- Awards: Officier de la Légion d’Honneur (2015)

Yashwant Sinha (Hindustani pronunciation: [jəʃˈʋən̪t̪ sɪnˈɦɑː], born 6 November 1937) is an Indian politician and retired Indian Administrative Service officer. He served as the Minister of Finance from 1990 until 1991 under Prime Minister Chandra Shekhar and again from March 1998 to July 2002 under Prime Minister Atal Bihari Vajpayee. He also served as the Minister of External Affairs from July 2002 until May 2004. He was a senior leader of the BJP before he left the party on 21 April 2018. In 2022, he was the Presidential candidate of India for the opposition.

== Early life ==
Sinha was born in a Kayastha family in Patna, Bihar. He graduated from University of Patna in BA Hons (History). He received his master's degree in political science in 1958. Subsequently, he taught the subject at the University of Patna until 1962.

== Civil Service career ==
After securing All India rank 12th in the UPSC Civil Services Examination, Sinha joined the Indian Administrative Service in 1960 and spent over 24 years holding important posts during his service tenure. He served as Sub-Divisional Magistrate and District Magistrate for 4 years. He was Under Secretary and Deputy Secretary in the Finance Department of the Bihar Government for 2 years after which he worked in the Ministry of Commerce as Deputy Secretary to the Government of India.

From 1971 to 1973, he was First Secretary (Commercial) in the Indian Embassy, Bonn, West Germany. Subsequently, he worked as Consul General of India in Frankfurt from 1973 to 1974. After working for over seven years in this field, he acquired experience in matters relating to foreign trade and India's relations with the European Economic Community. Thereafter, he worked in the Department of Industrial Infrastructure, Government of Bihar State and in the Ministry of Industry, Government of India dealing with foreign industrial collaborations, technology imports, intellectual property rights, and industrial approvals.

He later was Joint Secretary to Government of India in the Ministry of Surface Transport from 1980 to 1984, his main responsibilities were road transport, ports, and shipping. He resigned from service in 1984.

== Political career ==
=== Janata Dal ===
Sinha resigned from the Indian Administrative Service in 1984 and entered active politics as a member of the Janata Party. He was appointed All-India General secretary of the party in 1986 and was elected Member of the Rajya Sabha (Upper House of the Indian Parliament) in 1988.

When the Janata Dal was formed in 1989, he was appointed General Secretary of the party. He worked as Minister of Finance from November 1990 to June 1991 in Chandra Shekhar's Cabinet.

=== BJP ===
He became the National Spokesperson of the BJP in June 1996. He was elected to Lok Sabha as a BJP candidate from Hazaribagh in 1998, 1999, and 2009. He was appointed Finance Minister in March 1998. He was appointed Minister for External Affairs on 1 July 2002. In the 2004 Indian general election, he was defeated by Bhubneshwar Prasad Mehta of CPI. He re-entered the Parliament as a member of Rajya Sabha same year. On 13 June 2009, he resigned as vice-president of BJP. In 2018, he quit the BJP citing the "party's condition" and that "democracy in India is in great danger".

In his autobiography Drohkaal ka Pathik, released in November 2013, former MP Pappu Yadav alleged that three MPs of his Indian Federal Democratic Party got money from the then finance minister Sinha, to join the NDA in 2001.

Also there were allegations against Yashwant Sinha, that he was involved in the UTI scam.

On 4 April 2017, Sinha was detained in Hazaribagh district along with BJP MLA Manish Jaiswal and 150 others after trying to hold a religious procession. On police stopping them, his supporters protested and allegedly threw stones at the police.

=== TMC and 2022 presidential campaign ===
On 13 March 2021, he joined TMC to fight against BJP just before the 2021 West Bengal Assembly Election. On 15 March 2021 he was appointed vice president of the Mamata Banerjee-led party. He was selected unanimously as the President Candidate of the Opposition for 2022 Presidential Election, making him the First TMC leader to be nominated for the President.

== Finance minister ==
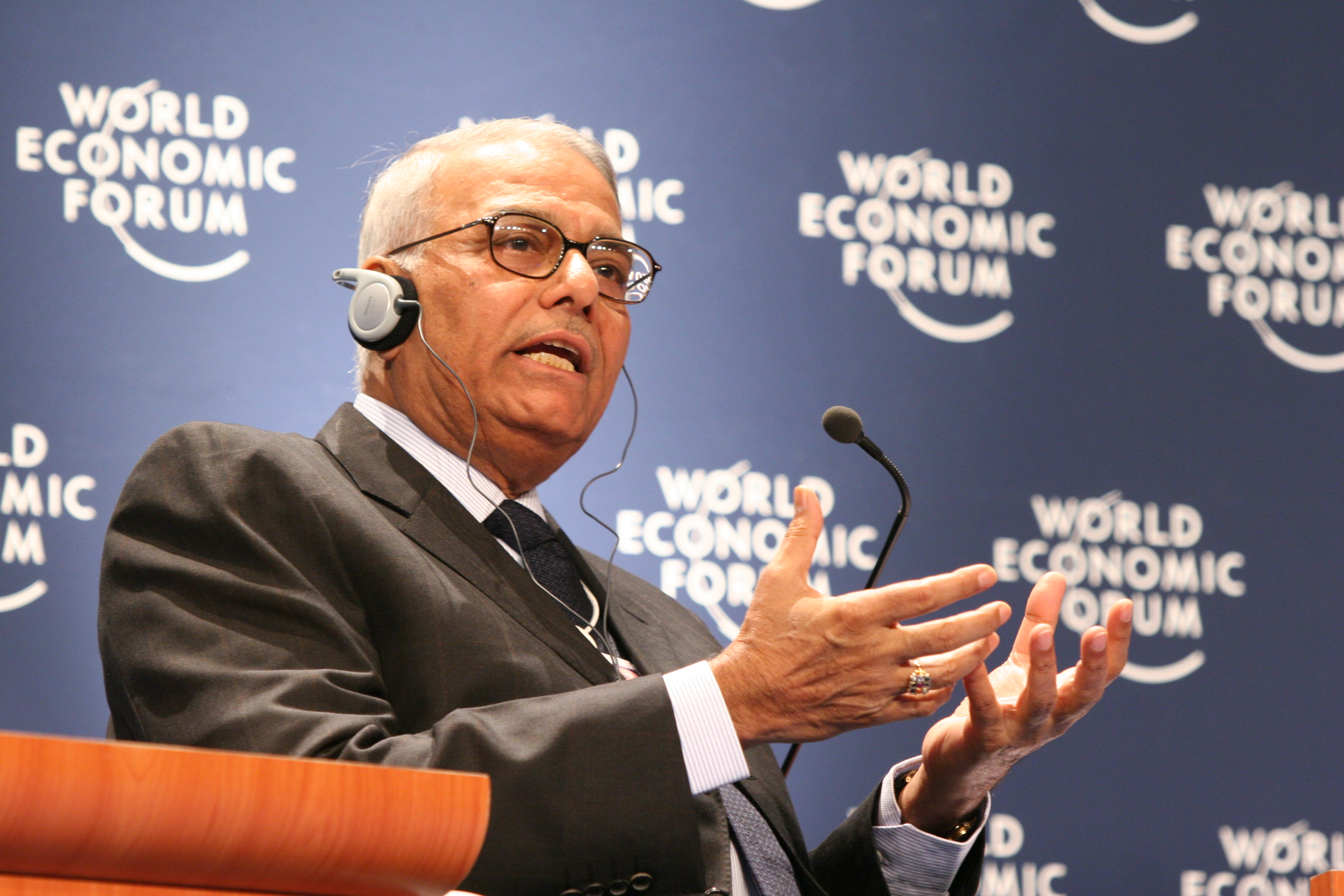
Sinha speaking at World Economic Forum on East Asia in 2008

Sinha was the finance minister until 1 July 2002, when he exchanged jobs with foreign minister Jaswant Singh. Sinha, during his tenure, was forced to roll back some of his government's major policy initiatives for which he was much criticised. Still, Sinha is widely credited with pushing through several major reform measures that put the Indian economy on a firm growth trajectory. Among them are lowering of real interest rates, introducing tax deduction for mortgage interest, freeing up the telecommunications sector, helping fund the National Highways Authority, and deregulating the petroleum industry. Sinha is also known for being the first Finance Minister to break the 53-year tradition of presenting the Indian budget at 5 pm local time, a practice held over from British Rule days that sought to present the Indian budget at a time convenient to the British Parliament (1130am GMT) rather than India's Parliament.

Sinha has written a comprehensive account of his years as Finance Minister titled Confessions of a Swadeshi Reformer.

Yashwant Sinha has been accused by opponents, and by other political observers of trying to promote nepotism by nominating his son Jayant Sinha as a successor to contest from Hazaribagh overlooking the interests of many other loyal party workers, though he tried to justify the nomination of his son as a party decision.

== Honours ==
In 2015, he was awarded Officier de la Légion d’Honneur, the highest civilian distinction of France. It was bestowed upon him in recognition of his work as Union Minister of Finance, Minister of External Foreign Affairs and for his invaluable contribution to international issues.

== Personal life ==
Sinha was born in a Bihari kayastha family and has a wide range of interests including reading, gardening and meeting people. He has widely travelled and has led a number of political and social delegations. He played a leading role in many negotiations on behalf of India. Sinha's wife is Nilima Sinha, one of India's leading children's writers and President, Association of Writers and Illustrators for Children. They have a daughter, Sharmila, and two sons: Jayant Sinha and Sumant Sinha. Sinha blogs under the title Musings of a Swadeshi Reformer. He has co-authored the book India Unmade with Aditya Sinha.

== Electoral performance ==
=== Rajya Sabha ===
Position	Party	Constituency	From	To	Tenure
Member of Parliament, Rajya Sabha (1st Term)	JD	Bihar	3 April 1988	14 November 1993	5 years, 225 days
Member of Parliament, Rajya Sabha (2nd Term)	BJP	Jharkhand	8 July 2004	16 May 2009	4 years, 312 days

2009 Indian general election: Hazaribagh
Party	Candidate	Votes	%	±%
BJP	Yashwant Sinha	2,19,810	31.81	
INC	Saurabh Narain Singh	1,79,646	26.00	
AJSU	Chandra Prakash Choudhary	86,880	12.57	
JMM	Shivlal Mahto	53,902	7.80	
CPI	Bhubneshwar Prasad Mehta	53,785	7.78	
JVM(P)	Braj Kishore Jaiswal	43,745	6.33	
Majority		40,164	5.81	
Turnout		6,90,943	53.08	
Registered electors				
BJP gain from CPI		Swing		

Results of the 2022 Indian presidential election
Candidate	Coalition	Individual votes	Electoral College votes	%
Droupadi Murmu	National Democratic Alliance	2,824	676,803	64.03
Yashwant Sinha	United	1877	380,177	35.97
Valid votes		4,701	1,056,980	98.89
Blank and invalid votes		53	15,397	1.11
Total		4,754	1,072,377	100
Registered voters / Turnout		4,809	1,086,431	98.86

Political offices
Preceded by Madhu Dandavate	Minister of Finance; November 1990 – June 1991	Succeeded by Manmohan Singh
Preceded by P. Chidambaram	Minister of Finance; March 1998 – July 2002	Succeeded by Jaswant Singh
Preceded by Jaswant Singh	Minister for External Affairs; July 2002 – May 2004	Succeeded by Natwar Singh
Order of precedence
Unknown	Order of Precedence of India as Joint Secretary to Government of India; 1980–1984	Unknown
