= M. L. Vishwakarma =

Indian politician (1936–2026)

Mahabir Lal Vishwakarma

Member of Parliament, Lok Sabha
- In office 13 May 1996 – 13 March 1998
- Preceded by: Bhubneshwar Prasad Mehta
- Succeeded by: Yashwant Sinha
- Constituency: Hazaribagh, Bihar

Personal details
- Born: 1 January 1936 Noora, Bihar and Orissa Province, British India (present-day Jharkhand, India)
- Died: 19 November 2026 (aged 90)
- Party: Independent (from 2004)
- Other political affiliations: Bhartiya Janata Party (till 2004)
- Spouse: Sita Devi (m. 1954)
- Children: 6
- Occupation: Politician

Mahabir Lal Vishwakarma (1 January 1936 – 19 November 2026) was an Indian politician, educationist and member of Parliament. He was elected during the 11th general elections of India conducted in 1996. He represented Hazaribagh parliamentary constituency from 1996 to 1998.

== Life and background ==
Vishwakarma was born on 1 January 1936 in British India and raised in Noora area of Hazaribagh of Bihar state. He did Master of Science and Diploma in education at Bihar University, and then Tilka Manjhi Bhagalpur University and Banaras Hindu University in Varanasi Uttar Pradesh. After completing his education, he then worked as a teacher and educationist.

== Career ==
Vishwakarma was initially serving as a teacher and then established his associations with Bhartiya Janata Party to contest 11th Lok Sabha elections. He was elected as the member of parliament and remained in office from 1996 to 1998.

In 2004 Indian general election and 14th Lok Sabha, the party declined his ticket, citing his "unsuitable efforts" made during the election campaign against its official candidate Yashwant Sinha. After resigning from the party, he contested as a nonpartisan candidate but was declared "defeated".

== Personal life and death ==
Vishwakarma was born to Latoo Mistry and married Sita Devi on 21 May 1954. The couple had four daughters and two sons. He died on 19 November 2026, at the age of 90.
