= Yadunath Pandey =

Indian politician

Member of Parliament, Lok Sabha
- In office 1989–1991
- Preceded by: Damodar Pandey
- Succeeded by: Bhubneshwar Prasad Mehta
- Constituency: Hazaribagh

Personal details
- Born: 4 May 1955 (age 71) Lakatola, Siwan district, Bihar
- Party: Bharatiya Janata Party
- Spouse: Purnima Pandey (m. 1983)
- Children: 2 Sons
- Parent: Swaminath Pandey (father)
- Education: M.Sc, LLB
- Alma mater: Ranchi University
- Profession: Educationist, Politician

Yadunath Pandey is an Indian politician. He served as the Jharkhand State President of BJP and was elected as a member of the 9th Lok Sabha, from the lower house of the Parliament of India under Prime Minister V. P. Singh representing Hazaribagh between 1989 and 1991.
