= Vinoba Bhave University =

University in India

- University Logo
- Other name: VBU
- Former name: Ranchi University
- Motto: Jīvanam̩ Satyaśōdhanam
- Motto in English: Life is Truth
- Type: Public State University
- Established: 1992 (34 years ago)
- Accreditation: NAAC
- Affiliations: UGC; ACU
- Chancellor: Governor of Jharkhand
- Vice-Chancellor: Chandra Bhushan Sharma
- Academic staff: 250+
- Administrative staff: 320+
- Students: 10,000+
- Undergraduates: 7,800+
- Postgraduates: 2,000+
- Doctoral students: 870+
- Location: Hazaribagh, Jharkhand, India; 24.0221887°N 85.3705909°E
- Campus: Urban
- Website: www.vbu.ac.in/login

Vinoba Bhave University is a state university located in Hazaribagh, Jharkhand, India, about 100 km from Ranchi, the state capital. The university offers courses at the undergraduate and post-graduate levels. It manages and maintains 20 constituent colleges, as well as 61 affiliated colleges which teach up to the undergraduate level. The university educates people in physical science, life science, earth science, social science, humanities, commerce, technology, medical science, law, education, homeopathy and ayurvedic medicines. The university came into existence on 17 September 1992 as a result of the bifurcation of Ranchi University. The university is named after Acharya Vinoba Bhave, a philosopher and social reformer.

The Governor of Jharkhand is the chancellor of Vinoba Bhave University. The university is a member of the Association of Commonwealth Universities. The University Grants Commission recognized the university and registered it under section 12B of the University Grants Commission Act, 1956.

== Affiliated Colleges ==
Its jurisdiction extends over 5 districts: Chatra, Giridih, Hazaribagh, Koderma, and Ramgarh.

=== General Degree College ===
- St. Columba's College, Hazaribagh
- Annada College, Hazaribagh
- J.J College, Jhumritelaiya
- J.M. College, Bhurkunda

=== Dental College ===
- Hazaribag College of Dental Sciences and Hospital (HCDSH), Hazaribag
- Hazaribag College of Dental Hospital Demotand, Hazaribag

Medical College

• Sheikh Bhikhari Medical College & Hospital

- Devki Mahaveer Homeopathic College and Research Hospital

== See also ==
- List of universities in India
- List of institutions of higher education in Jharkhand
- Ranchi University
- University Grants Commission (India)
- National Assessment and Accreditation Council
