= Rubicon Research =

Indian pharmaceutical company

Rubicon Research Ltd.
- Type: Public
- Traded as: NSE: RUBICON; BSE: 544578
- Industry: Pharmaceutical
- Founded: 1999; 27 years ago
- Headquarters: Mumbai, India
- Products: Pharmaceuticals
- Services: Contract Research, Formulation Development (NDDS), Contract Manufacturing & supply chain, Dossier Development ANDA/CTD format
- Website: www.rubicon.co.in

Rubicon Research is an Indian pharmaceutical company located in Mumbai.

The company has its corporate headquarters and R&D center in Thane, India, an R&D center in Concord, Canada, manufacturing plants located in Ambernath, Satara and Pithampur, India, and a regulatory office in East Windsor, US.

== History ==
Rubicon Research was founded in 1999 by Pratibha Pilgaonkar, Sudhir Pilgaonkar, and Maharukh Rustomjee. In 2000 it started operations as an independent product development company, located in Bhandup, Mumbai, with three scientists in a 2,000 sq ft (190 m^{2}) laboratory. It became an outsourcing partner to the global healthcare and pharmaceutical industry. In 2003, the Directorate of Science and Technology, Government of India approved the facilities as a commercial Research and Development (R&D) company.

In 2006-07 Rubicon licensed its Orodispersible excipient, RubiODT to Mallinckrodt Baker, Inc.

In 2009 the company commission an oral solids manufacturing plant in Ambernath, India. Rubicon Research started its commercial manufacturing and shipments to the US and Europe in 2015.

In 2012 Rubicon Research signed an agreement with Avantor Performance Materials to develop and market a novel gastro-retentive excipient that enables the delivery of molecules with a window of absorption.

In 2016, in Series B funding, the private equity firm Everstone Capital Asia bought out the stakes of Kotak Private Equity and Maharukh Rustomjee.

In 2019, Rubicon Research received a US$100 million growth capital commitment from General Atlantic and acquired 15 ANDAs to augment its generic portfolio.

In 2020 Rubicon Research Private Limited acquired Impopharma Canada Limited with operations in Ontario, Canada, expanding its global development network, and established Rubicon Research Canada Ltd. The Canadian development facility specializes in the development and testing of pulmonary and nasal drug delivery systems and ophthalmic, otic, and dermal products.

In 2021 the company launched two subsidiaries—Rubicon Consumer Healthcare and Rubicon Academy.

In July 2021, Rubicon Research announced the acquisition of Meditab Specialities Limited's oral liquid dosage and nasal product manufacturing facility located in Satara, Maharashtra. Meditab Specialities Limited is a wholly owned subsidiary of Cipla.
