= Sheikh Bhikhari Medical College =

College affiliated with Vinoba Bhave University, India

- Former name: Hazaribag Medical College
- Motto: आरोग्यं परमं भाग्यं
- Type: Medical College and Hospital
- Established: 2019; 7 years ago
- Affiliations: Vinoba Bhave University
- Principal: Dr. Sunil Kumar Verma
- Location: Kolghatti, Hazaribag, Jharkhand, 825301, India; 24.0161466°N 85.3613559°E
- Campus: Urban
- Website: hazaribagmedicalcollege.org
- Location within Jharkhand Location within India

Sheikh Bhikhari Medical College (earlier name Hazaribag Medical College) is a tertiary referral Government Medical college. It was established in the year 2019. The college imparts the degree Bachelor of Medicine and Surgery course (MBBS).

== Geography ==
=== Location ===
Sheikh Bhikhari Medical College and Hospital is located at 24.0161466°N 85.3613559°E.

== About College ==
The college is affiliated to Vinoba Bhave University and is recognised by Medical Council of India. The hospital associated with the college is one of the largest hospitals in the Hazaribag district. The selection to the college is done on the basis of merit through National Eligibility and Entrance Test. Yearly undergraduate student intake is 100 from the year 2019.

== Courses ==
Sheikh Bhikhari Medical College undertakes education and training of students MBBS courses.

== See also ==
- Education in India
- Literacy in India
- List of institutions of higher education in Jharkhand
- Sheikh Bhikhari
