= P. K. Thakur =

Indian civil servant

Pramod Kumar Thakur

Information Commissioner Bihar State Information Commission
- In office 29 October 2018 – 17 February 2023

Director General of Police Bihar Police
- In office June 2014 – February 2018

Personal details
- Born: 18 February 1958 (age 68) Madhepura, Bihar, India
- Spouse: Poonam Thakur
- Education: B.Sc; M.A.(International Relations)
- Alma mater: University of Delhi; JNU
- Occupation: Bureaucrat
- Awards: President's Police Medal for Meritorious Service, 1997; President's Police Medal for Distinguished Service, 2005; National Security Guard Disc

Pramod Kumar Thakur or P. K. Thakur (born 18 February 1958), is a retired Indian Police Service (I.P.S.) officer of Bihar state in India, and he served as Information commissioner in the state of Bihar. He served as Director General of Police of Bihar Police from June 2014 until his retirement in February 2018. He belongs to the I.P.S. batch of 1980. He has also served as Director General (Vigilance Bureau) in Bihar. He was awarded with National Security Guard Disc for his outstanding work in the Central Police Organization as Inspector General (Administration). He was appointed on the post of Information commissioner of Bihar State Information Commission in October 2018.

== Early life and education ==
Thakur was born on 18 February 1958 – a son to Bisheshwar Thakur. He received his early education at St. Xavier's, Hazaribagh before taking his Bachelor of Science in Chemistry from St. Stephen's College of Delhi University. He then went on to complete his post graduation in International Relations from JNU in Delhi. Thakur began his government service in the year 1980.

== Police career ==
Thakur belongs to the Bihar Cadre of the Indian Police Service (I.P.S.). His first posting was as Patna City Assistant Superintendent of Police (ASP) in 1981 and later became Patna Superintendent of Police (City SP). He has served various districts of Bihar and Jharkhand (erstwhile part of Bihar) as Superintendent of Police. He has also served as Deputy Inspector General (DIG) at the National Human Rights Commission, Inspector General at Central Police Organization and Director General of Vigilance Bureau in Bihar.

Apart from active policing in the field, Thakur has also served numerous departments of Bihar Police such as Special Branch (Secret Service of State Police) and Crime Investigation Department (CID).

He has also been empanelled in DG rank by the Ministry of Home Affairs - which means, he is empanelled by the Central Government to hold the post of DG in any Central Police Organization.

== Director General of Police, Bihar ==
Thakur was posted as Director General of Bihar Police in June 2014. He replaced outgoing DGP Abhayanand as 49th DGP of the state on 25 June 2014. He retired from this position on 1 March 2018 and K.S. Dwivedi replaced him as 50th DGP of Bihar Police.

== Awards and honours ==
Thakur has been awarded the President's police medal for meritorious services in 1997 and President's medal for distinguished services in 2005. He was also awarded with National Security Guard Disc for his outstanding work in the Central Police Organization.

== Personal life ==
Thakur is married to Poonam Thakur and they have two children. He currently resides in Patna with his wife.
