= Anshuman Gaur =

Indian diplomat

Anshuman Gaur (born 11 June 1974) is an Indian Foreign Service officer of 2001 batch. He is currently the Indian Ambassador to Hungary, and previous Chief of Protocol of India from 2022 to 2025. On 25 February 2019, he was appointed as the deputy chief of mission of India, in the Indian High Commission in Ottawa, Canada. After his stint as director (Europe West), he was appointed as the private secretary to Information Technology, Law & Justice, Communications & Electronics Minister Ravi Shankar Prasad, in December 2017. He was serving as director (Europe West) in the Ministry of External Affairs. Earlier, he served as the officer on special duty (OSD) to the vice president of India from June 2017 to August 2017. He also writes poetry in English. He was featured writer for 2017 poetry contest conducted by Word Weavers.

== Early life and education ==
Gaur was born in Patna, Bihar. His mother was a University Professor and father was a civil servant. He studied in St Michael's High School Patna. He completed his matriculation from St. Xavier's School Hazaribagh in 1990. He graduated from Patna Science College in 1995. He did his post graduation in Geology from Delhi University in 1997.

== Career ==
After initial training at Lal Bahadur Shastri National Academy of Administration, Gaur Went to the Foreign Service Institute New Delhi. After the course he was posted to Paris, France, for language training. He served as second secretary at Permanent Mission of India to UNESCO, Paris. He returned to India and served in the Ministry of External Affairs as Under Secretary (Bhutan) and as OSD (PR) in XP Division, where he was tasked with the handling of the foreign media in India. In 2009 he was posted as first secretary (political) to Embassy of India in Kathmandu, Nepal. In Nepal he initiated several new bilateral cooperation programmes, including training of Nepalese diplomats in India. In 2012, he was posted to Indian embassy in Paris, France, as counsellor (economic and commercial). He worked to expand India–France trade and investment. He met French business persons and gave talks all over France. He was the keynote speaker at 5 plus City Forum seminar on Smart Cities held in Paris, France. He was also the keynote speaker at Seminar on Clean India- Challenges & Opportunities, organized by IFFCI in Mumbai on 8 April 2015.

== Personal life ==
He is married to Apoorva Srivastava, who is also an Indian Foreign Service officer. They have two daughters, Ayana and Ananya Gaur.

== Awards and publications ==
- Awarded the Bimal Sanyal Medal for Best Officer Trainee for 2001 batch at the Foreign Service Institute
- Monograph 'War Under Nuclear Shadow'- FSI, 2002
- Isthmus of Time, a collection of poetry, ISBN 978-8193458501
