= List of cities in Jharkhand by population =

This is a list of urban agglomerations and cities (those not included in the Urban Agglomerations), with a population above 100,000 as per 2011 census in the Indian state of Jharkhand:

== Urban agglomeration ==
In the census of India 2011, an urban agglomeration was defined as follows:

"An urban agglomeration is a continuous urban spread constituting a town and its adjoining outgrowths (OGs), or two or more physically contiguous towns together with or without outgrowths of such towns. An Urban Agglomeration must consist of at least a statutory town and its total population (i.e. all the constituents put together) should not be less than 20,000 as per the 2001 Census. In varying local conditions, there were similar other combinations which have been treated as urban agglomerations satisfying the basic condition of contiguity."

Rank	Name	Image	District	Type*	Population 2011	Male	Female	Population below 5 yrs	Literacy rate
1	Jamshedpur		East Singhbhum, Seraikela Kharsawan	UA	1,337,131	696,858	640,273	153,872	85.94
2	Dhanbad		Dhanbad district	UA	1,195,298	633,363	561,935	151,010	80.64
3	Ranchi		Ranchi district	UA	1,126,741	586,634	540,107	128,541	83.60
4	Bokaro Steel City		Bokaro district	UA	563,417	299,232	264,185	67,672	84.87
5	Deoghar		Deoghar district	City	203,116	108,243	94,873	25,929	86.80
6	Phusro–Bermo–Bokaro Thermal		Bokaro district	UA	186,139	97,665	88,474	22,125	79.99
7	Hazaribagh		Hazaribagh district	UA	153,599	80,095	73,504	17,276	90.14
8	Giridih		Giridih district	UA	143,529	74,841	68,688	20,658	82.41
9	Ramgarh		Ramgarh district	UA	132,441	70,879	61,562	17,086	82.97
10	Medininagar (Daltonganj)		Palamu district	UA	119,972	63,244	56,728	13,752	88.84
11	Chirkunda		Dhanbad district	UA	118,822	62,394	56,428	14,742	77.03
* UA=Urban Agglomeration

=== Constituents of urban agglomerations in Jharkhand ===
The constituents of urban agglomerations in Jharkhand, with a population of 1 lakh or above, are noted below:

- Jamshedpur Urban Agglomeration includes: * Jamshedpur (Tata Command Area), Jamshedpur (Notified Area Committee), Mango (Municipal Corporation), Adityapur (Municipal Corporation), Jugsalai (Municipal Council), Kapali (Municipal Council), Tatanagar Railway Colony (Out Growth), Bagbera (CT), Kitadih (CT), Chhota Govindpur (CT), Haludbani (CT), Sarjamda (CT), Gadhra (CT), Ghorabandha (CT), Dobo (CT), Parsudih (CT), Kandra (CT), Tamolia (CT), Purihasa (CT) and Chhota Gamharia (CT).
- Dhanbad Urban Agglomeration includes: Dhanbad (Municipal Corporation), Pondarkanali (CT), Malkera (CT), Baua Kalan (CT) and Nagri Kalan (CT).
- Ranchi Urban Agglomeration includes: Ranchi (Municipal Corporation), Kanke (CT), Arsande (CT), Ara (CT), Tundiul (CT) and Bargarwa (CT).
- Bokaro Steel City Urban Agglomeration includes: Bokaro Steel City (CT), Chas (Municipal Corporation), Bandhgora (CT) and Kamaldih (CT).
- Phusro Urban Agglomeration includes: Phusro (Municipal corporation), Bermo (CT), Jaridih Bazar (CT), Bokaro Thermal (CT) and Kurpania (CT).
- Hazaribagh Urban Agglomeration includes Hazaribagh (Municipal Corporation) and Okni (CT).
- Giridih Urban Agglomeration includes: Giridih (Municipal Corporation), Paratdih (CT), Sirsia (CT), Pertodih (CT) and Dandidih (CT).
- Ramgarh Urban Agglomeration includes: Ramgarh (Municipal Council), Sirka (CT), Marar (CT) and Barkakana (CT).
- Medininagar (Daltonganj) Urban Agglomeration includes: Medininagar (Daltonganj) (M Corp.), Rerma (CT), Sundna (CT), Baratola (CT), Nimiya (CT), Bajraha (CT), Bairiya (CT), Redma (CT) ward 0001, Sudna (CT) ward 0001, and Baralota (CT) ward 0001.
- Chirkunda Urban Agglomeration includes: Chirkunda (Municipal Council), Egarkunr (CT), Siuliban (CT), Mera (CT), Maithon (CT) and Dumarkunda (CT).

Abbreviations: M Corp. = Municipal corporation, M = Municipal Council, NAC = Notified area committee, CT = Census town, CB = Cantonment Board, OG= Out growth

== Urban agglomeration constituents ==
Urban agglomerations constituents with a population above 100,000 as per 2011 census are shown in the table below.

Urban agglomeration	Name of constituent	District	Type*	Population 2011	Male	Female	Population below 5 yrs	Literacy rate
Jamshedpur	Jamshedpur	East Singhbhum	NAC	629,659	327,912	301,747	64,098	87.50
	Mango	East Singhbhum	M Corp.	224,002	116,243	107,759	28,258	86.62
	Jugsalai	East Singhbhum	JMC	49,660	26,036	23,624	6,115	84.36
	Adityapur	Seraikela Kharsawan	M Corp.	173,988	91,495	82,493	23,042	83.46
	Kopali	Seraikela Kharsawan	KMC	43,256	22,337	20,919	7,603	72.40
Dhanbad	Dhanbad	Dhanbad	M Corp.	1,161,561	615,589	545,972	146,463	80.78
Ranchi	Ranchi	Ranchi	M Corp.	1,073,440	559,031	514,409	122,353	88.49
Bokaro Steel City	Bokaro Steel City	Bokaro	CT	413,934	220,088	193,846		84.94
Hazaribagh	Hazaribagh	Hazaribagh	M corp	142,494	74,267	68,227	16,100	89.95
Giridih	Giridih	Giridih district	M Corp.	176,387	85,373	75,410	15,604	89.16
Medininagar	Medininagar	Palamu	M Corp.	389,307	2,4,924	78,523	15,446	85.75

== See also ==
- List of cities in Jharkhand by area
