= Tapen Sen =

Indian judge

Hon'ble Justice Tapen Sen

President of the Jharkhand State Consumer Disputes Redressal Commission
- In office October 2017 – October 2020

Judge of the Calcutta High Court
- In office January 2006 – 2 September 2015

Judge, Punjab & Haryana High Court
- In office January 2004 – 2 January 2006

Judge, Jharkhand High Court
- In office January 2002 – January 2004

Tapen Sen (born 2 September 1953) is a former judge of the Calcutta High Court, the Punjab and Haryana High Court and the Jharkhand High Court and currently the President of the Jharkhand State Consumer Disputes Redressal Commission.

== Early life ==
Born into a wealthy household in Hazaribagh, he completed his schooling from St. Xavier's School and passed his Indian School Examination conducted by the University of Cambridge Local examination Syndicate, U.K. by securing first Division in 1970. He graduated from St. Columba's College, Hazaribag in 1974. He passed his LL.B. Examination from Chotanagpur Law College Ranchi in 1979.

== Career ==
He joined Ranchi Bench of Patna High Court in 1980 and handled cases including writs, criminal law, civil law, arbitration, matrimonial disputes and labour disputes. He was appointed counsel for the State Government of Bihar as Government Pleader for the Ranchi Bench of the Patna High Court on 25 July 1997, which he declined citing personal reasons. He was retained as counsel for various state owned enterprises.

He was elevated as a Permanent Judge of the Jharkhand High Court on 28 January 2002.
