= Maghotsab of Brahma Samaj =

Maghotsav is the main festival of the Brahmos celebrated on 11 Magh each year according to the Bengali calendar to mark the anniversary of Brahmo Samaj. The celebration commemorates the inauguration of the first Brahmo Samaj by Ram Mohan Roy on 23 January 1830, which was on 11 Magh according to the Bengali calendar in that year.

Maghotsav is celebrated with traditional fervour and gaiety by Brahmos all over the world. It is celebrated by divine service or prayer, offered by the acharya or minister, interspersed with devotional hymns popularly known as Brahmasangeet. In Kolkata, which is now the main seat of Brahmoism, week long celebrations are carried out in the Brahmo Samajes like Sadharan Brahmo Samaj, Navavidhan Brahmo Samaj, Brahmo Sammilan Samaj. The other Samajes in Bengal like Harinavi, Konnagar, Baniban, Nimta, Puddopukur also join in the festivities.

A special divine service is held on 11 Magh at Jorasanko Thakur Bari - the seat of the Tagore's in Kolkata where ministers from the three main Samajes join in performing the Maghotsav. The songs are sung by the music group Baitanik - founded by late Soumendranath Tagore.

Maghotsav is also celebrated in other Brahmo Samajes in India and the Brahmo educational institutions as well and in Tagore's Santiniketan. However these are one-day celebrations rather than a week long.

The Brahmo religion stands for the following (as laid down in the Trust Deed of the Brahmo Samaj):

- Followers shall love Him and do His will and worship the One Absolute Prambrahma, the Creator, Preserver, Destroyer who is the giver of all Good in this world and the next, who is All knowing, All Pervading, Formless and Beneficent
- Followers shall not adore any created thing, thinking it to be the Supreme One
- Followers should perform good deeds - and it is through these good deeds one can serve God
- He is the One, Alone and Absolute - Ekamevadityam
- The Samaj is to be a meeting ground for all sects for the worship of the One True God
- No object of worship or a set of men shall be reviled or contemptuously spoken of or alluded to in any way
- No graven image statue or sculpture carving painting picture portrait or the likeness of anything shall be admitted within
- No object animate or inanimate that has been or is or shall hereafter become or be recognized as an object of worship
- No sacrifice offering oblation of any kind or thing shall ever be permitted
- Promote, charity, morality, piety, benevolence, virtue and strengthen the bonds of union between men of all religions and creed
- For more details on the Maghotsav check out Brahmo Samaj Festivals
- Sadharan Brahmo Samaj
- Raja Rammohun Roy
