= Manish Jaiswal =

Indian politician (born 1965)

Member of Parliament, Lok Sabha
- Incumbent
- Assumed office 4 June 2024
- Preceded by: Jayant Sinha
- Constituency: Hazaribagh

Member of Jharkhand Legislative Assembly
- In office 2014–2019
- Constituency: Hazaribagh

Personal details
- Born: 8 March 1965 (age 61) Motihari, Bihar, India
- Party: Bharatiya Janata Party (BJP)
- Spouse: Nisha Jaiswal
- Education: Ranchi University
- Occupation: Politician

Manish Jaiswal (born 8 March 1965; Hindi pronunciation: [mən̪iːʃ d͡ʒɛːsʋaːl]) is an Indian politician from Jharkhand. He was elected candidate for Lok Sabha from Hazaribagh Lok Sabha constituency in Hazaribagh district. He is a member of the Bharatiya Janata Party.

== Early life and education ==
Jaiswal was born in Motihari to Braj Kishore Jaiswal and Vidya Jaiswal. He runs his own business. He completed his BA honours in history in 1990 at St. Columbus College, Hazaribagh which is affiliated with Ranchi University. He married Nisha Jaiswal on 30 January 1990.

== Career ==
Jaiswal won the 2019 Jharkhand Legislative Assembly election from Hazaribagh Assembly constituency representing Bharatiya Janata Party. He polled 106,208 votes and defeated his nearest rival and his namesake, Dr. Ramchandra Prasad of Indian National Congress, by a margin of 51,812 votes.

In 2024, he won from Hazaribagh Lok Sabha constituency representing BJP in the 2024 Indian general election in Jharkhand. He defeated his nearest rival Jai Prakash Bhai Patel of Indian National Congress.

He first won as an MLA in the 2014 Jharkhand Legislative Assembly election on BJP ticket from Hazaribagh Assembly constituency by defeating an independent candidate, Pradip Prasad, by a margin of 27,129 votes.

== See also ==
- 18th Lok Sabha
- Bharatiya Janata Party
