= Everstone Capital Asia =

Singapore-based venture capital firm

- Type: Private company
- Industry: Financial services
- Founded: 2006
- Founders: Sameer Sain (Co-founder and CEO); Atul Kapur (Co-founder and CIO)
- Headquarters: Singapore
- Area served: Worldwide
- Key people: Alok Oberoi (Executive Chairman); Sujoy Bose (CEO, Investment Management); Avnish Mehta (Vice Chairman, Private Equity); Amit Manocha (Group CFO and MD, Private Equity); Prashant Desai (Managing Director)
- Products: Private equity
- AUM: $3.1 Billion (2024)
- Number of employees: 425 (2023)
- Parent: Everstone Group
- Website: www.everstonecapital.com

Everstone Capital Asia (also known as Everstone), established in 2006, is a private equity firm founded by Sameer Sain and Atul Kapur. Headquartered in Singapore, it operates globally, maintaining offices not only in India and Singapore but also in London, New York City, Mauritius, and United Arab Emirates.

== History ==
The origin of the company can be traced back to Future Capital, a financial services firm that was established by Sameer Sain and Atul Kapur in partnership with Future Group in 2005. Sain and Kapur took over Future Capital's private equity business in 2006 to form Everstone Capital.

At first, the company began its operations in London. Soon after, they rapidly expanded, establishing five additional offices in Singapore, India (Mumbai, Delhi, and Bangalore) and Mauritius. In 2008, it relocated their headquarters to Asia.

In 2018, Everstone opened its office in New York.

== Business overview ==
In addition to operating in the private equity sector, the company has three other investment verticals;

- Real Estate & Infrastructure: Everstone partnered with the American real estate investment firm, Realterm Group to create IndoSpace Logistic Parks. In 2017 and 2018 respectively, the Canada Pension Plan Investment Board and Singapore-based GLP, partnered with IndoSpace to enter the Indian market.
- Venture Capital: In 2013, the company formed DSG Consumer Partner, a joint venture with Deepak Shahdadpuri, which invests in early-stage consumer businesses in India and Southeast Asia.

== Investments ==
Portfolio companies	Entry Year	Investment in US$	Exit
Acqueon	2019	Not Publicly Available	Part exit in 2022 (via stake sale)
Burger King - India and Indonesia	2014	$100 million (approx.)	Part exit in 2020 (via IPO)
Calibre Chemicals	2021	$100 million (approx.)	-
CPC Diagnostics	2019	Not Publicly Available	-
Everlife	2019	$500 million (approx.)	-
Mediamint	2016	$100 million (approx.) along with US-based Recognize	-
Modern Foods	2016	Not Publicly Available	2021
Omega Healthcare	2019	Not Publicly Available	2025
Rubicon Research	2016	$33 million	2019
S. Chand Group	2012	$38 million (for 35% stake)	-
Sahyadri Hospitals	2019	Not Publicly Available	-
Servion Global Solutions	2017	$70 million (initial investment of $66 million in 2014, follow on investment of $8million in 2017)	-
Slayback Pharma	2020	$50 million (approx.)	-
Softgel Healthcare	2022	$200 million (approx.)	-
Subway (master franchise for India, Sri Lanka and Bangladesh)	2021	Not Publicly Available	-
Sula Vineyards	Not Publicly Available	Not Publicly Available	10% Stake Sold in 2013
Translumina Therapeutics	2019	$72 million (approx.)	-
QMetry	2020	Not Publicly Available	2024
Wingify	2025	$200 million (approx.)	

== Environmental, social, and governance ==
Everstone Capital Asia incorporates environmental, social, and corporate governance considerations into its investment strategies. With Lightsource BP, in 2018 Everstone formed Eversource Capital. The venture manages funds for decarbonization solutions in India, including renewable energy, distribution infrastructure, e-mobility and other green energy services. Later in August 2021, it became a signatory of the Carbon Disclosure Project.
