= List of cities in Jharkhand by area =

- Cities which are listed in **bold** are the headquarters of the respective district.

‡ State capital

Rank	City	District	Area (km^{2}) (as per MC)
1	**Ranchi** Jharkhand	Ranchi	652.02
2	**Dhanbad**	Dhanbad	577.00
3	**Jamshedpur**	East Singhbhum, Seraikela Kharsawan	224.00
4	**Hazaribagh**	Hazaribagh	190.90
5	**Bokaro Steel City**	Bokaro	183.00
6	**Deoghar**	Deoghar	110.00
7	**Giridih**	Giridih	87.40
8	Medininagar (Daltonganj)	Palamu	53.94
9	**Ramgarh**	Ramgarh	50.00
10	Phusro	Bokaro	45.22
11	Chirkunda	Dhanbad	25.00
12	Jhumri Telaiya	Koderma	

== See also ==
- List of cities in India by area
- List of cities in Jharkhand by population
