= Santosh Choubey =

Indian social entrepreneur

- Born: Santosh Kumar Choubey; September 22, 1955 (age 71); Khandwa, Madhya Pradesh, India
- Education: Maulana Azad National Institute of Technology
- Occupations: social entrepreneur, founder and chairman, AISECT group, chancellor AISECT group of universities
- Known for: social enterprise, AISECT, NGO, literature
- Spouse: Vineeta Choubey
- Children: 2
- Awards: Senior Ashoka Fellow
- Website: santoshchoubey.com

Santosh Choubey is an poet, writer, Indian social entrepreneur and educationalist. He founded the All India Society for Electronics and Computer Technology (AISECT) in 1985. He is chairman of AISECT and chancellor of the Rabindranath Tagore University. AISECT focuses on education, skills training, vocational education, financial and digital services in rural and semi-urban areas of India.

== Early life and education ==
Santosh Kumar Choubey was born in 1955 in Khandwa, Madhya Pradesh. Choubey did his schooling from Government School Khandwa and completed his education with a bachelor's degree in electronics and telecommunication Engineering from Maulana Azad National Institute of Technology (NIT, Bhopal). Consequently, he also got selected into the Indian Engineering Services (1976) and the Indian Civil Services (1981). He made the decision of forgoing the civil services and pursuing his interest in the areas of Science and Technology and joined Bharat Electronics Limited (New Delhi). Later on, he worked with IDBI as a consultant in Bhopal.

=== Initiatives and work ===
AISECT developed a model of community-based centres operated by local entrepreneurs. These centres provided digital literacy, vocational education, and IT-enabled services.

The initiative expanded access to skills training, education, and employment opportunities in villages and small towns. Over time, AISECT also became involved in higher education, skill development programs, and e-governance initiatives.

==== Skill development ====
AISECT has been actively striving towards filling the skill gap in India. The Kaushal Vikas Yatra, carried out in 22 states, 300 districts, and 500+ schools and colleges, has generated humongous awareness about the need for skilling and career prospects among youth. Building on this surge, the 6th edition of Kaushal Charcha has been successfully conducted, enhancing national-level discourse on employability, entrepreneurship, and the future of work.

==== Financial inclusion ====
Focused on expanding financial inclusion, AISECT operates a network aimed at delivering banking services to rural and semi-urban populations. The initiative has established over 7,000 banking kiosks connected to more than 2,800 bank branches, facilitating the opening of over 10.7 million bank accounts.

==== Employments and livelihoods ====
AISECT has become a forerunner employment-generation platform with its flagship program Rojgar Mantra. Today, the network has 20 lakh+ professionals, 1,500+ registered employers and organizations, and 200+ permanent staffing clients. The program has shortlisted 2 lakh+ candidates, organized 700+ Rojgar Melas, and covered 85+ districts in 18 Indian states in all these years, thus providing meaningful livelihood opportunities to young people throughout the nation.

=== Impact ===
AISECT has established an extensive network of centres in rural India. The organisation is recognised for contributing to digital literacy and livelihood creation in underserved areas.

== Career ==
Choubey founded All India Society for Electronics and Computer Technology (AISECT) in 1985. The organisation became a registered society in 1997.

== Select awards ==
- Vishwa Hindi Shikhar Samman 2024
- Maghnad Saha Award 1987
- Dushyant Kumar Award 1986
- Shankar Dayal Sharma Srijan Award 2005
- Rajbhasha Prachar Samiti Award 2009
- Finalist in Social Entrepreneur Of The Year 2010
- Ashoka Senior Fellowship Award 2011
- Life Time Achievement Award 2013
- SKOCH Renaissance Awards 2013
- Valley of Words (VOW) Award 2017
- Lifetime Achievement Award 2018
- Vaatayan International Shikhar Samman 2023
