= Hazaribagh =

City in Jharkhand, India

- City
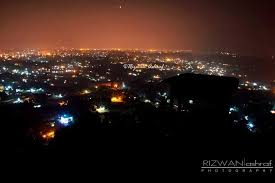
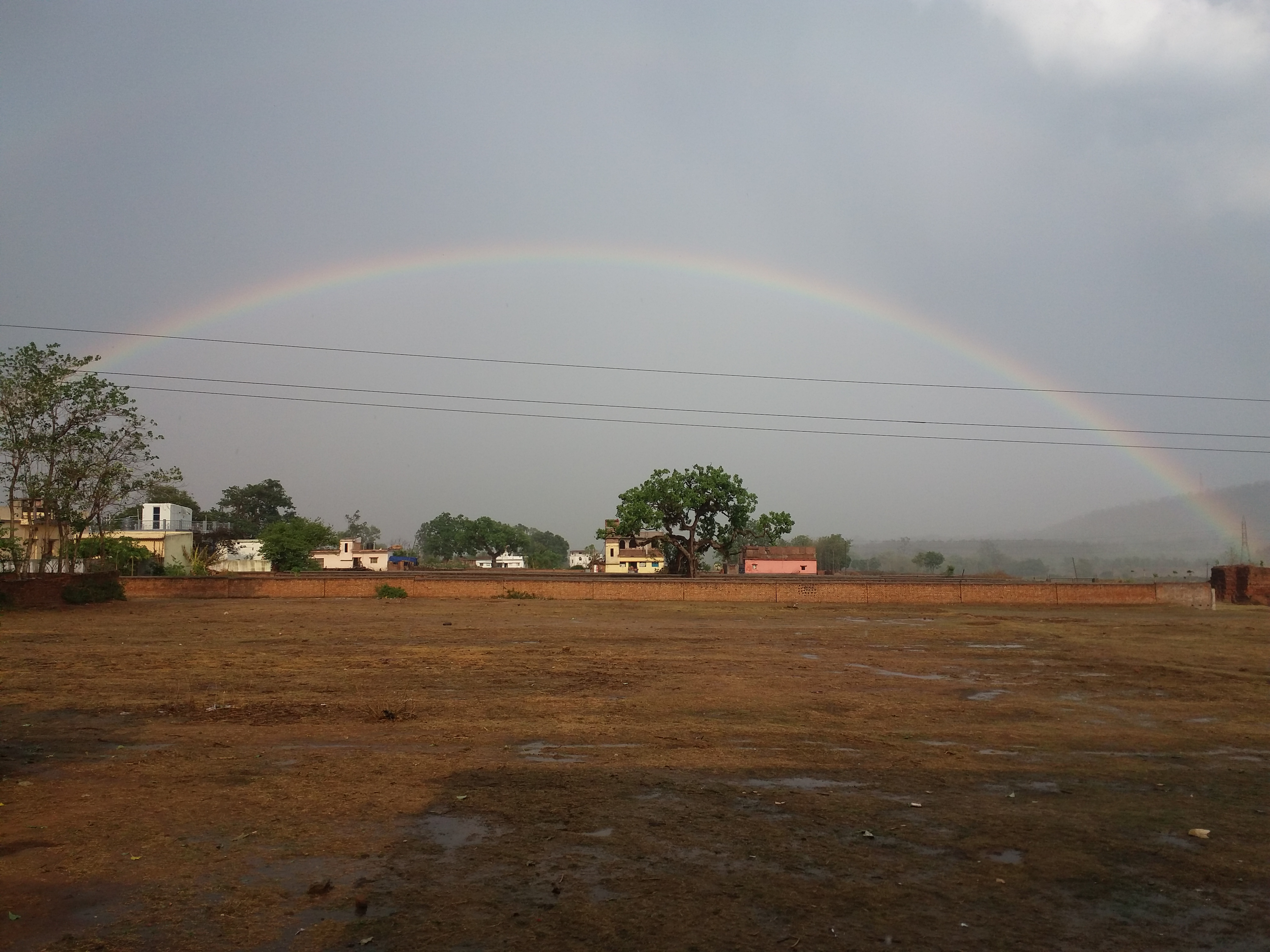
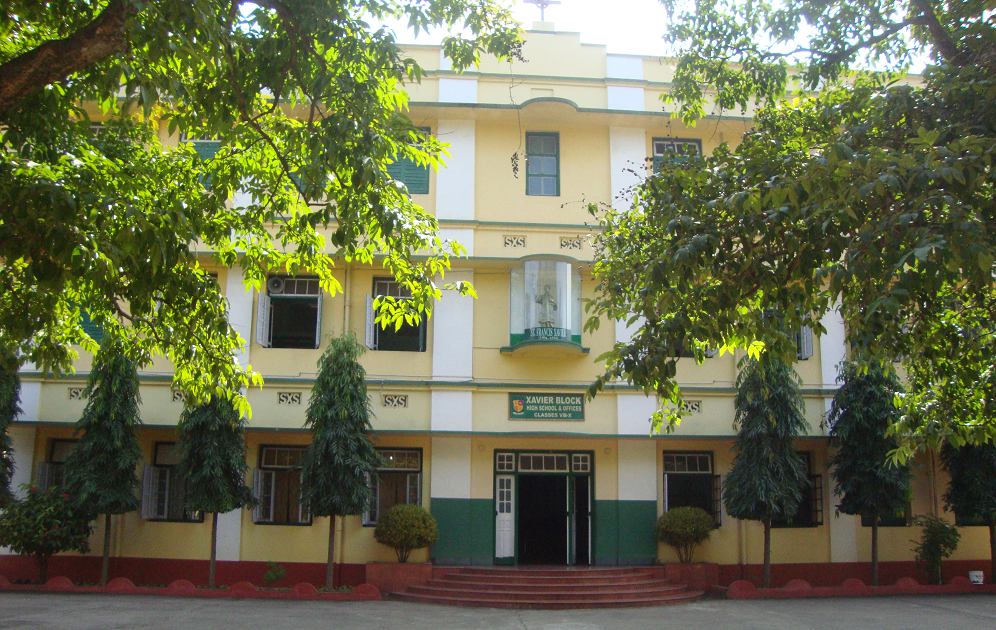
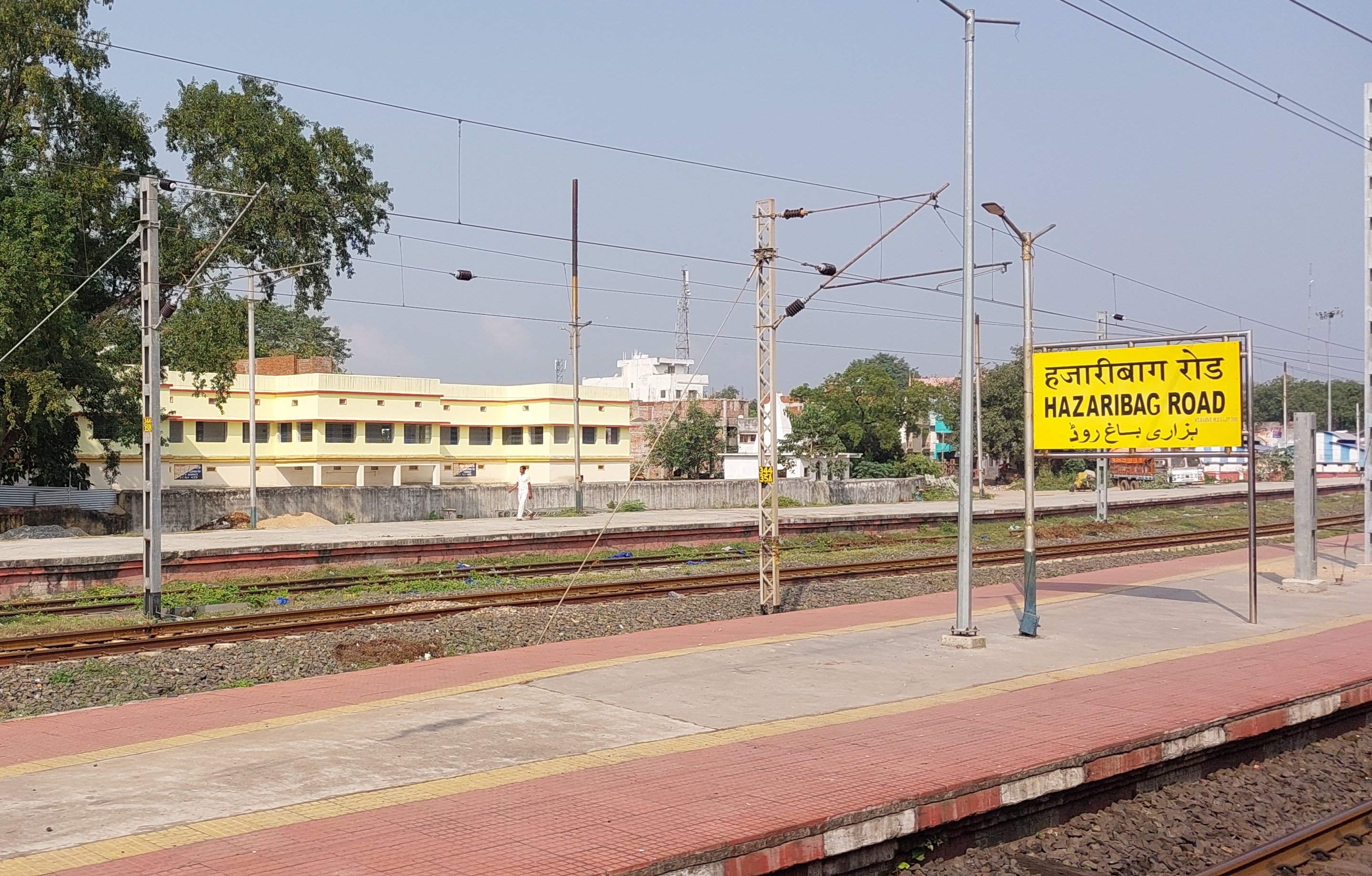
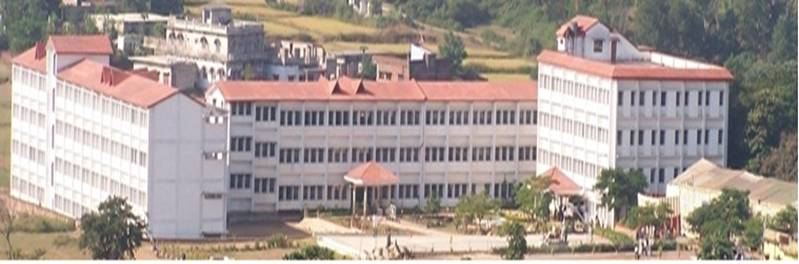
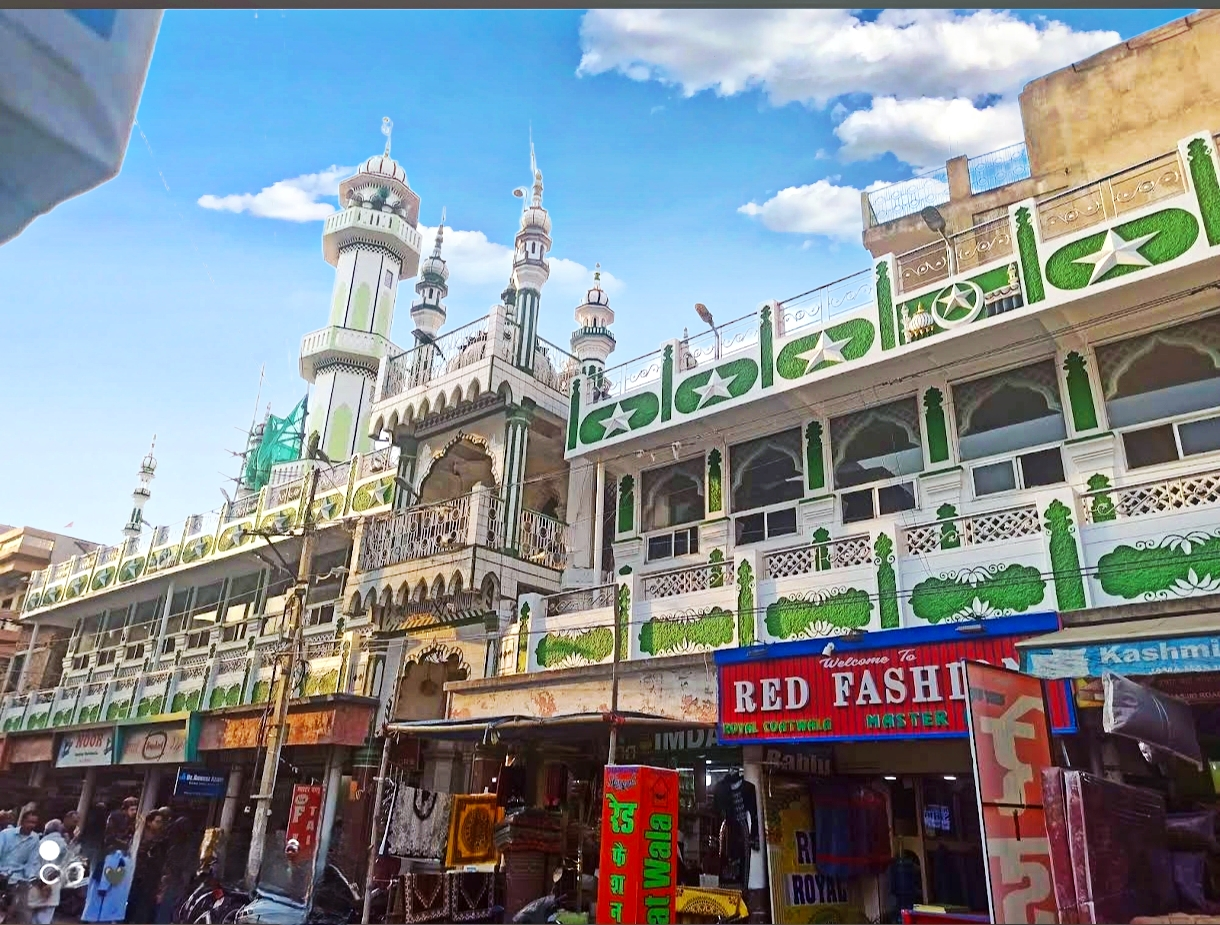
- Clockwise from top: Hazaribagh at night, St. Xavier's School, D.A.V Public School, Jama Masjid Hazaribagh, Hazaribagh Road railway station, Hazaribagh town area

- Location in Jharkhand, India Hazaribagh (India)
- Coordinates: 23.98°N 85.35°E
- Country: India
- State: Jharkhand
- District: Hazaribagh
- Established: 1790

Government
  - Type: Municipal governance in India(municipal corporation)
  - Body: Hazaribagh Municipal Corporation
  - District Magistrate: Smt. Nancy Sahay, IAS

Area
  - Total: 190.93 km^{2} (73.72 sq mi)
  - Rank: 4th
- Elevation: 610 m (2,000 ft)

Population (2011)
  - Total: 142,489
  - Rank: 5th
  - Density: 746.29/km^{2} (1,932.9/sq mi)

Languages
  - Official: Hindi, Urdu
- Time zone: UTC+5:30 (IST)
- PIN: 825301
- Vehicle registration: JH-02
- Website: hazaribag.nic.in

Hazaribagh (Hindustani pronunciation: [ɦəzɐ̞ɾɨ.baːɣ]) is a city and a municipal corporation in Hazaribagh district, Jharkhand, India. It is the administrative headquarters of Hazaribagh district and divisional headquarters of North Chotanagpur division. The city is known as a health resort and for the Hazaribagh Wildlife Sanctuary.

== Etymology ==
The name of the town 'Hazaribagh' (हज़ारीबाग़) is derived from two Persian words: Hazar (هزار) meaning 'one thousand' and bagh (باغ) meaning 'garden', hence the meaning of Hazaribagh is 'city of a thousand gardens'. According to Sir John Houlton, however, the town takes its name from the small villages of Okni and Hazari – shown on old maps as Ocunhazry.

The last syllable in its name may have originated from a mango grove which formed a camping ground for troops and travellers marching along a military road from Kolkata to Varanasi, constructed in 1783 and the following years. The Grand Trunk Road subsequently replaced this military road in the mid-19th century, but the layout differed at places, particularly around Hazaribagh. A dilapidated watch tower meant to guard the military road is still visible on Tower Hill, near Silwar.

== History ==
In ancient times, the district was covered with forests inhabited by tribes who remained independent. Throughout the Turko-Afghan period, the area remained virtually free from external influence. It was only with the accession of Akbar to the throne of Delhi in 1557 that Muslim influence penetrated Jharkhand, then known to the Mughals as Kokrah. In 1585, Akbar sent a force under the command of Shahbaj Khan to reduce the Raja of Chotanagpur to the position of a tributary.

After the death of Akbar in 1605, the area regained its independence. This necessitated an expedition in 1616 by Ibrahim Khan Fateh Jang, the governor of Bihar and brother of Queen Noorjehan. Ibrahim Khan defeated and captured Durjan Sal, the 46th Raja of Chotanagpur. He was imprisoned for 12 years but was later released and reinstated on the throne after he had shown his ability in distinguishing a real diamond from a fake one.

In 1632, Chotanagpur was given as a jagir (land grant) to the Governor at Patna for an annual payment of Rs.136,000. This was raised to Rs.161,000 in 1636. During the reign of Muhammad Shah (1719–1748), Sarballand Khan, the governor of then Bihar, marched against the Raja of Chotanagpur and obtained his submission. Another expedition was led by Fakhruddoula, the governor of Bihar in 1731. He came to terms with the Raja of Chotanagpur. In 1735 Alivardi Khan had difficulty in enforcing the payment of the annual tribute of Rs.12,000 from the Raja of Ramgarh, as agreed to by the latter according to the terms settled with Fakhruddoula.

This situation continued until the occupation of the country by the British. During the Muslim period, the main estates in the district were Ramgarh, Kunda, Chai, and Kharagdiha. Following the Kol uprising in 1831 – which however did not seriously affect Hazaribagh – the administrative structure of the territory was changed. The parganas of Ramgarh, Kharagdiha, Kendi, and Kunda became parts of the South-West Frontier Agency and were formed into a division named Hazaribagh as the administrative headquarters. In 1854 the designation of South-West Frontier Agency was changed to Chota Nagpur Division, composed of five districts: Hazaribagh, Ranchi, Palamau, Manbhum, and Singhbhum. The division was administered as a non-regulation province under a commissioner reporting to the Lieutenant Governor of Bengal. In 1855–56 the Santhals rose up against the British, but were brutally suppressed.

During this era of British rule, Hazaribagh was accessed first by train to Giridih and then by 'push-push', a vehicle that was pushed and pulled by human force over hilly tracts, across rivers, and through dense forests containing bandits and wild animals. Rabindranath Tagore travelled in a push-push along the route in 1885. He recorded the experience in an essay, "Chotanagpur families". When the Grand Chord railway line was opened in 1906, Hazaribagh Road railway station became the link to the town. For many years, Lal Motor Company operated the rail-cum-bus service between Hazaribagh town and Hazaribagh Road railway station.

In 1912, the new province of Bihar and Orissa split from Bengal Province. In 1936, the province was split into separate provinces of Bihar and Orissa, with the Chota Nagpur Division being a part of Bihar. Bihar's boundaries remained mostly unchanged after Indian Independence in 1947. Giridih district was created in 1972 by carving some parts of Hazaribagh district. After the 1991 census, the district of Hazaribagh was divided into three separate districts: Hazaribagh, Chatra, and Koderma. The two sub-divisions Chatra and Koderma were upgraded to the status of independent districts. In 2000, Jharkhand was separated from Bihar to become India's 28th state. In 2007, Ramgarh was separated and made into the 24th district of Jharkhand.

=== Hazaribagh Town ===
The town became a cantonment in 1790, the Ramgarh battalion having been raised ten years earlier. It was then part of Ramgarh district. It became a district headquarters in 1834. Hazaribagh was constituted as a municipality in 1869. The military cantonment, south-east of the town, flourished until 1874, when, after an outbreak of enteric fever in that year, the troops were mostly withdrawn, except for a small detachment to mind the penitentiary. This resulted in a planned city. This part of the town is known as Boddam Bazar, after the officer who laid it out.

Many Englishmen settled in Hazaribagh during the British period. They built large bungalow-type houses, often with sloping roofs. They were great hunters and hunting stories abounded in the town by word of mouth. Most of them left after India became independent. Tutu Imam topped the list of hunting legends in the town along with Rajendra Pandey.

The town had a population of 15,799 in the 1901 census. It was described in as "little more than a cluster of hamlets, with intervening cultivation, which sprang up around the former military bazar." At the time, it was common for tigers and leopards to prey upon livestock in the outskirts of the town.

Hazaribagh Central Jail housed many leaders of the Indian freedom movement, including Dr. Rajendra Prasad, who was later the first President of India. After Jayaprakash Narayan was put under arrest in this jail during the Quit India Movement of 1942, he escaped with the help of 53 dhotis (sheets) to cross the wall of the jail. The support he received from the local people is one of the legends of the Indian Independence movement.

During the early years of World War II, an internment camp ("parole camp") for German civilians was established in the town. In June 1942 it housed 36 women, 5 men, and 16 children, of whom 21 females with 13 children were transferred on 25 February 1942 from Diyatalawa. In autumn they were transferred to the family camps at Purandhar or Satara.

=== Early settlers ===
A small but effective Bengali community – including Mukherjee, Ghosh, Mallick, and Aikats – settled at Hazaribagh in the 19th century when the area was in Bengal Presidency and the British administration was looking for people with English education. These families significantly contributed to the upkeep of the local education system. Amongst the most talked-about early Bengali settlers was Rai Bahadur Jadunath Mukherjee, who was appointed as the first Government Pleader of Hazaribagh in 1864. He established the Hazaribagh Brahmo Samaj in 1867 by donating his own land. He also established the Jadunath Girls School in 1873 donating his own land (around 1920, a new school building was built with the initiative of Bengali families such as Braja Kumar Niyogi and Chanchala Niyogi with funds from various sources, such as the estate of Raja of Ramgarh; later upgraded as Jadunath Girls High School in 1956).Rai Bhadur Jadunath Mukherjee was foremost in establishing the town's Keshav Hall and Library and was its first president. He was prominent amongst those who established the Hazaribagh Bongiya Durga Bari in 1889 in his compound. He provided a food-for-work programme during the 1873–1874 Bihar Famine. His house hosted numerous great Indians such as Ramananda Chattopadhaya, writer Sanjib Chandra Chattopadhay (of Palamau fame), Rabindranath Tagore, and Indira Debi.

Later, scholars such as Mahesh Chandra Ghosh and Dhirendranath Choudhury made the town their home. The poet Kamini Roy lived in the town for some years. Manmathanath Dasgupta, a Brahmo missionary spent many years in Hazaribagh working amongst the downtrodden.Surat Kumar Gupta contributed towards the development of the town in many ways. Doctors such as Mandindra Bhushan Banerjee (Panna Babu), Bikash Kumar Sen, Sambhu Nath Roy, and Benoy Chandra Chatterjee were prominent personalities. The noted Bengali author and writer for many Hindi films like Sujata, Subodh Ghosh, was born and brought up in Hazaribagh. Many of his stories are set in the region. The great Brahmo leader Keshub Chunder Sen, accompanied by Trailokyanath Sanyal, visited Hazaribagh in 1874 to recoup his health. He wrote many pieces during his short stay and participated in Bhadrotsav celebrations. After his death in 1884, a public hall on the Main Road was named Kesab Hall in his memory. Amongst the Brahmo missionaries who visited Hazaribagh regularly was Pramathalal Sen.

== Geography ==
Hazaribagh City
CT: census town, R: rural/ urban centre, T: tourist centre, C: educational centre, F: facility
Owing to space constraints in the small map, the actual locations in a larger map may vary slightly

== Demographics ==
Historical population
Year	Pop.	±%
1872	11,050	—
1881		—
1891		—
1901	15,799	—
1911	17,009	+7.7%
1921	17,060	+0.3%
1931	20,947	+22.8%
1941	24,918	+19.0%
1951	33,812	+35.7%
1961	40,958	+21.1%
1971	54,818	+33.8%
1981	80,155	+46.2%
1991	97,824	+22.0%
2001	127,269	+30.1%
2011	142,489	+12.0%
2021	185,000	+29.8%
2022	190,000	+2.7%
Source: Census of India

As per the 2011 Census of India, Hazaribagh Urban Agglomeration had a total population of 153,599, of which males were 80,095 and females 73,504. Hazaribagh Urban Agglomeration is composed of Hazaribagh (Nagar Nigam) and Okni (Census Town). As per the 2011 Census of India, Hazaribagh Nagar Parishad had a total population of 142,489, of which 74,132 were males and 68,357 females. Scheduled Castes numbered 7,987 and Scheduled Tribes numbered 2,708. As of 2001 India census, Hazaribagh had a population of 127,243. Males constituted 53% of the population and females 47%. Hazaribagh has an average literacy rate of 76%, higher than the national average of 64.83%: male literacy is 81%, and female literacy is 70%. In Hazaribagh, 13% of the population is under 6 years of age.

The population of the town and the area is overwhelmingly Khortha-speaking. Due to migration of people from other states, Hindi is also spoken, but mainly in town areas. Due to the early settlers, the headquarters of Hazaribagh also has a significant Bengali-speaking population. There is also a sprinkling of Santhali speakers, mainly in the rural areas. Hindus form the majority of the population, with a sizable Muslim population. Punjabis form small minorities. A few Bengalis are followers of Brahmo Samaj, established up by Keshub Chandra Sen.

Hazaribagh was upgraded to a municipal corporation in June 2015 by adding the area and population of 19 adjoining villages. As per the 2011 census, the total number of literates in Hazaribagh Urban Agglomeration was 122,881 (90.14% of the total population) out of whom 66,602 were males and 56,279 were females, while the total number of literates in Hazaribagh Nagar Parishad was 112,533 out of whom 60,840 were males and 51,693 were females.

== Infrastructure ==
According to the District Census Handbook 2011, Hazaribagh, Hazaribagh (Nagar Parishad) covered an area of 26.35 km^{2}. Among the civic amenities, it had 269 km of roads with both open and closed drains, and a protected water supply involving tap water from treated sources, uncovered wells, and overhead tanks. It had 23,825 domestic electric connections, and 1,405 road lighting points. Among educational facilities it had 28 primary schools, 22 middle schools, 15 secondary schools, 4 senior secondary schools, 5 general degree colleges, 1 medical college, 1 engineering college, 1 management institute/college, 1 polytechnic, 2 recognised shorthand, typewriting, and vocational training institutions, and 1 non-formal education centre (Sarva Siksha Abhiyan). Among social, recreational, and cultural facilities it had 1 special school for the disabled, 1 orphanage home, 3 working women's hostels, 1 old age home, 2 stadiums, 5 cinema theatres, 3 auditorium/community halls, and 3 public libraries and reading rooms. Important manufactured commodities include were sattu, agarbatti, rice mill products, and furniture. It had branches of 14 nationalised banks, 8 private commercial banks, 1 co-operative bank, 1 agricultural credit society, and 19 non-agricultural credit societies.

== Climate ==
Climate data for Hazaribagh (1981–2010, extremes 1901–2012)
Month	Jan	Feb	Mar	Apr	May	Jun	Jul	Aug	Sep	Oct	Nov	Dec	Year
Record high °C (°F)	30.6 (87.1)	33.6 (92.5)	39.1 (102.4)	41.7 (107.1)	43.9 (111.0)	46.6 (115.9)	39.6 (103.3)	39.1 (102.4)	33.3 (91.9)	34.0 (93.2)	31.7 (89.1)	29.4 (84.9)	46.6 (115.9)
Mean daily maximum °C (°F)	21.8 (71.2)	24.7 (76.5)	29.6 (85.3)	34.9 (94.8)	36.6 (97.9)	34.0 (93.2)	29.3 (84.7)	28.7 (83.7)	28.9 (84.0)	27.7 (81.9)	25.0 (77.0)	22.2 (72.0)	28.6 (83.5)
Mean daily minimum °C (°F)	8.3 (46.9)	11.8 (53.2)	16.4 (61.5)	21.2 (70.2)	23.6 (74.5)	23.9 (75.0)	22.9 (73.2)	22.7 (72.9)	22.0 (71.6)	18.2 (64.8)	13.2 (55.8)	9.1 (48.4)	17.8 (64.0)
Record low °C (°F)	0.9 (33.6)	1.7 (35.1)	2.9 (37.2)	10.6 (51.1)	15.6 (60.1)	18.3 (64.9)	18.9 (66.0)	20.0 (68.0)	16.5 (61.7)	9.7 (49.5)	4.4 (39.9)	0.5 (32.9)	0.5 (32.9)
Average rainfall mm (inches)	19.1 (0.75)	22.2 (0.87)	15.8 (0.62)	18.8 (0.74)	44.8 (1.76)	237.6 (9.35)	387.7 (15.26)	341.3 (13.44)	256.1 (10.08)	57.9 (2.28)	9.3 (0.37)	9.7 (0.38)	1,400.3 (55.13)
Average rainy days	1.5	2.0	1.9	1.4	3.3	10.7	17.0	15.7	11.9	4.2	0.5	0.9	71.1
Average relative humidity (%) (at 17:30 IST)	58	54	43	35	38	58	77	78	75	66	58	60	59
Source: India Meteorological Department

The Konar River, a tributary of the Damodar River, flows past the town. Historically the Hazaribagh area was a thick forest, and today is still surrounded by forests.

== Economy ==
=== Industry ===
Hazaribagh has the second-highest coal reserve in Jharkhand behind Dhanbad. The reserve is still largely intact. Recently there has been a spurt in the coal mining activities in the region by Central Coalfields Ltd., a subsidiary of Coal India Limited. Work is currently going on for the development of NTPC's 3000 megawatt (MW) power plant. Reliance Power's 3600 MW Super Thermal Power Projects was also proposed, but was later pulled out due to the failure of the negotiations between government and company on land distributions. Demotand and Chaano are industrial areas.

== Education ==
Hazaribagh has the Vinoba Bhave University within the city limits, named after Saint Vinoba Bhave. It is the second-largest university of Jharkhand. It also hosts the private AISECT University. St. Columba's College, Annada College, Medical College of Dhanbad and many engineering and local colleges are affiliated to this university.

After independence, Roman Catholics established a girls' school, Mount Carmel School Hazaribagh, in 1949. Parallel to this, Reverend Father John Moore, an Australian Jesuit missionary, set up St. Xavier's School in 1952. The National Public School, Hazaribagh, which started in 1977, is now affiliated to CBSE, and it is managed by the L.K.C. Memorial Education Society.

Hazaribagh has the police training centre for the whole of Jharkhand. The Border Security Force (BSF) also has a large presence. East India's largest training centre is here in the forest with hilly terrain. The Central Reserved Police Force is also present in the town near the lake.

=== Universities ===
- AISECT University, Jharkhand
- Vinoba Bhave University

=== Colleges ===
- Markham College of Commerce
- Sheikh Bhikhari Medical College

=== Schools ===
- Jawahar Navodaya Vidyalaya, Bonga, Hazaribagh
- St. Xavier's School, Hazaribagh

== Politics ==
Krishna Ballabh Sahay (born in Sheikhpura but had land in Khadhaiya, a village in Tandwa Block), the renowned freedom fighter and subsequently chief minister of Bihar, belonged to Hazaribagh. As revenue minister, he was instrumental in the abolition of zemindaries in Bihar. In 1952 that was the first such legislation in the country. The political rivalry between Sahay and the Kamakhya Narain Singh, the Raja of Ramgarh, was the talk of the town in the 1950s.

In the elections for the first Lok Sabha held in 1951, Nageshwar Prasad Sinha of Congress won the Hazaribagh East seat, and the Independent candidate Baboo Ram Narayan Singh won the Hazaribagh West seat. In 1957, Lalita Rajya Lakshmi, of the Ramgarh Raj family, won the seat. Basant Narayan Singh, the younger brother of Kamakhya Narayan Singh, won the seat four times, in 1962, 1967, 1977, and 1980. Damodar Pandey of Congress won it in 1984. Yadunath Pandey of BJP won it in 1989. Bhubneshwar Prasad Mehta of CPI won the seat in 1991 and in 2004. Mahabir Lal Viswakarma of BJP won the seat in 1996.

Yashwant Sinha of BJP won the seat in 1998 and went on to become Finance Minister and later Foreign Minister in the NDA government. He also won the seat in the 2009 Lok Sabha Elections. Bhubneshwar Prasad Mehta of the Communist Party of India won the seat in 2004 with the help of seat-sharing of the UPA.

Jayant Sinha, a senior leader of the Bharatiya Janata Party and the son of former Foreign Minister Yashwant Sinha, won the Lok Sabha elections in 2014, defeating the closest rival Saurabh Narayan Singh of the Indian National Congress by a huge margin of 1,59,128 votes.

Rajkumar Udaybhan Narain Singh, a scion of the erstwhile kingdom of Ramgarh Raj, he has a stronghold over this area. He is the independent director of JIADA (Jharkhand Industrial Area Development Authority) and is a senior member of Bhartiya Janta Party.

== Transportation ==
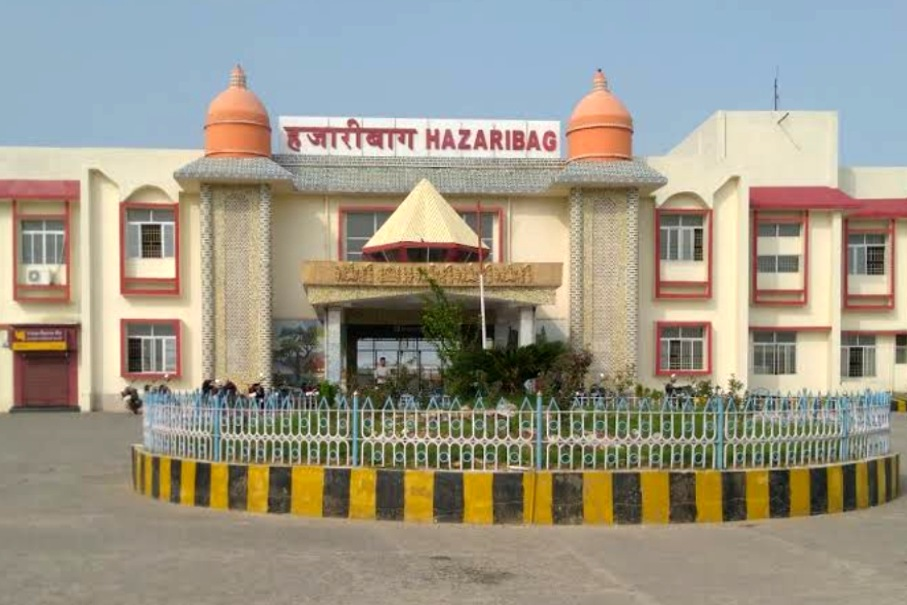
Hazaribagh Town railway station

The nearest airport is Birsa Munda Airport in Ranchi, the capital of Jharkhand, at a distance of 102 km (63 mi). Ranchi is connected with Bengaluru, New Delhi, Hyderabad, Mumbai, Kolkata, and Patna by regular flights.

A new 80 km (50 mi)-long railway line was constructed from Koderma–Hazaribagh–Barkakana, and became operational in February 2015. Two trains run between Koderma and Hazaribagh Town railway station (not to be confused with Hazaribagh Road railway station). Regular bus services along NH 20 also connect Hazaribagh to other cities in the region.

== Notable people ==
- A. E. J. Collins – held the record for the highest score in cricket for 116 years
- Subodh Ghosh – journalist and writer
- Raj Kumar Gupta – film director
- Bulu Imam – environmental activist and 2011 Gandhi International Peace Award Recipient
- Syed Zafar Islam – Member of Parliament and spokesperson of the Bharatiya Janata Party
- Subhash Mukhopadhyay – Creator of India's first child using in-vitro fertilization from a Bengali Family in Hazaribagh
- Tapen Sen – judge in the Calcutta High Court
- Rajkumar Udaybhan Narain Singh – Independent Director of JIADA and the grandson of Kamakhya Narain Singh and Basant Narain Singh
- Yashwant Sinha – Indian Minister of Finance (1990–1991, 1998–2002) and Minister of External Affairs (2002–2004)
- Mihir Vatsa – Award-winning author of Tales of Hazaribagh: An Intimate Exploration of Chhotanagpur Plateau

== Nearby places ==
- Konar Dam, 51 km (32 mi) from Hazaribagh
- Koderma, 60 km (37 mi) from Hazaribagh
- Surajkund hot spring, 72 km (45 mi) from Hazaribagh
- Tilaiya Dam
- Ranchi, 98 km (61 mi) from Hazaribagh

== See also ==
- Hazaribag travel guide from Wikivoyage
- Hazaribagh (community development block)
- Hazaribagh District
- List of cities in Jharkhand by population
- List of cities in Jharkhand by area
