= Bhubneshwar Prasad Mehta =

Indian politician (born 1940)

MP
- Constituency: Hazaribagh

Personal details
- Born: 2 August 1940 (age 85) Hazaribagh, Jharkhand
- Party: Communist Party of India
- Spouse: Shakuntala Devi
- Children: 1 son and 4 daughters
- As of 25 September, 2006

Bhubneshwar Prasad Mehta (born 2 August 1940) is an Indian politician, affiliated with the Communist Party of India. He represented the Hazaribagh constituency of Jharkhand in the 14th Lok Sabha.

== Biography ==
Mehta was born on 2 August 1940 in a poor farmer family belonging to Koeri community. He worked as a coal union leader in his early days. He is known as Stalin of Jharkhand. He won the 2004 Lok Sabha elections on a CPI ticket, defeating BJP's Yashwant Sinha, who served as the finance minister in the Vajpayee government. However, Mehta lost the next election to Yashwant Sinha.

== See also ==
- Dev Dyal Kushwaha
