= All India Society for Electronics and Computer Technology =

Social enterprise providing computer education

- Education, Empowerment, Enterprise
- Abbreviation: AISECT
- Formation: 1985
- Type: Organization
- Location: Bhopal, Madhya Pradesh, India
- Region served: India
- Services: Skill Development & Training, Higher Education, K12 Education, ICT based intervention, E-Governance, Financial Inclusion and Last Mile Service Delivery
- Key people: Santosh Choubey (Founder & Chairman), Siddhartha Chaturvedi (EVP), Abhishek Pandit (EVP), Pallavi Rao (EVP)
- Employees: 3300+ (2019)
- Website: aisect.org

All India Society for Electronics and Computer Technology (AISECT) is a social enterprise established in 1985 to take computer education to the rural and semi-urban masses. It was established by Santosh Choubey. The organisation now operates in 28 states and four union territories of India, serving millions of people mostly in rural and semi-urban areas through its 23,000+ end-mile service delivery centres.

== History ==
The society was established by Santosh Choubey and a few other youths in 1985 when computers were new to India. Computers became more useful and popular over the years but the rural and semi-urban masses of India were being left out from India's economic and digital growth story. AISECT realising the need to bridge the ICT gap and started developing computer education content in regional languages, starting with Hindi. It started opening computer training centres in rural districts and blocks of Madhya Pradesh in the early nineties after going through various reorganisations over the years, AISECT was officially registered as a cooperative society in the year 1997.
