= Defying the Odds: The Rise of Dalit Entrepreneurs =

2014 non-fiction book of Dalit entrepreneurs

- Author: Devesh Kapur, D. Shyam Babu, and Chandra Bhan Prasad
- Language: English
- Subject: Dalit entrepreneurs, Caste system in India
- Publisher: Random House India
- Publication date: July 2014
- Publication place: India
- Pages: 336 pp
- ISBN: 978-8-184-00570-7

Defying the Odds: The Rise of Dalit Entrepreneurs is a 2014 non-fiction book authored by Devesh Kapur, D. Shyam Babu, and Chandra Bhan Prasad, and published by Penguin Random House, India. The book documents the stories of Dalit entrepreneurs in India who have achieved significant success in business despite facing social and economic discrimination associated with the caste system in India.

== Background ==
The book contains short biographical profiles of 21 entrepreneurs who come from the Dalit community, a marginalised community in India, that faces significant social, political, and economic barriers. The book was a part of larger research project by Kapur to identify Dalit entrepreneurs, for which they surveyed 20,000 Dalit households in Uttar Pradesh. The project was funded by a multi-year grant awarded to Center for the Advanced Study of India, University of Pennsylvania from the John Templeton Foundation.

The book is derived from interviews with the subjects and their relatives – most of whom are first generation and faced extreme poverty and various forms of caste discrimination. The featured profiles are from across India and in diverse fields such as manufacturing, construction, health care, and education.

The list of people featured in the book include:

- Thomas Barnabas
- Nand Kishor Chandan
- Umesh Chaudhary
- Sanjiv Dangi
- Rajendra Gaikwad
- Bhagwan Gawai
- Malkit Chand
- Milind Kamble
- Ashok Khade
- Ratibhai Makwana
- Mannem Madhusudana Rao
- Murali Mohan
- Ravi Kumar Narra
- Raja Nayak
- Hari Kishan Pippal
- Sukesh Rajan
- Manju Rani
- Vijay Anand Rao Shelke
- Kishan Lal Singla
- Sitaram
- Sadhu Thorat

== Reception ==
Defying the Odds received positive attention for presenting a new perspective on Dalit identity.

Amy Kazmin for Financial Times wrote "Defying the Odds offers a highly readable and unusual perspective on the churning taking place at the Indian economy's grassroots." Forbes India noted that the book "breaks the stereotype of Dalits being a repressed and defeated community and speaks of their rise as entrepreneurs."

Preeti Mehra from The Hindu Businessline praised the book for its detailing of "inspirational tales of economic mobility," but highlighted the lack of representation of women entrepreneurs.

== See also ==
- Dalit Indian Chamber of Commerce and Industry
