= Central Institute of Plastics Engineering & Technology =

Central Institute of Plastics Engineering & Technology may refer to the following institutions in India:

- Central Institute of Plastics Engineering & Technology, Bhubaneswar
- Central Institute of Plastics Engineering & Technology, Hajipur
- Central Institute of Plastics Engineering & Technology, Khunti
- Central Institute of Plastics Engineering & Technology, Murthal
- Central Institute of Plastics Engineering & Technology, Raipur
