= Birsa Institute of Technology, Sindri =

Public Engineering Institution in Jharkhand, India

BIT Sindri
- Motto: Niyataṃ kuru karmatvam (Sanskrit)
- Motto in English: Perform your duties daily, for action is superior to inaction.
- Type: Public Technical institute
- Established: 1949; 75 years ago
- Accreditation: AICTE
- Affiliations: Jharkhand University of Technology
- Director: Pankaj Rai
- Location: Sindri, Jharkhand, India; 23.6547°N 86.4737°E
- Campus: Suburban, Area = (450 Acres)
- Nickname: BITians
- Website: www.bitsindri.ac.in

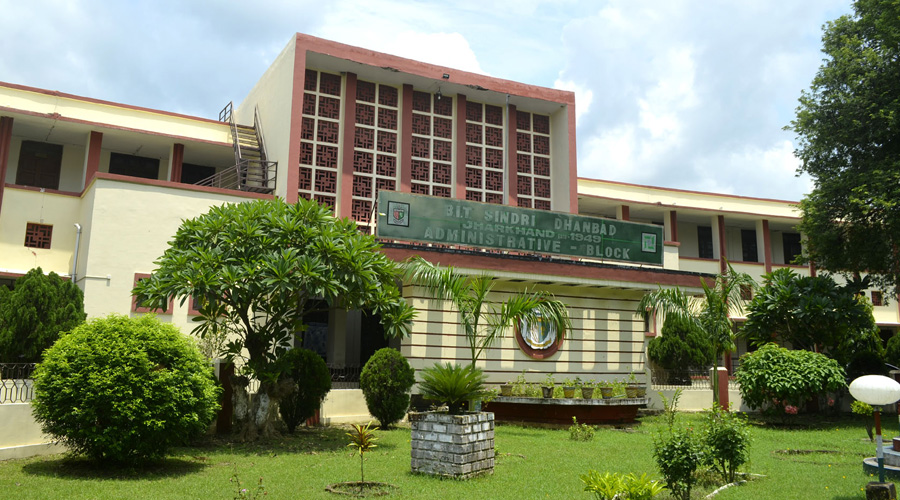
BIT Sindri main building

BIT Sindri is an affiliated engineering college in Sindri, Jharkhand, India. Established in 1949, BIT Sindri is one of the oldest engineering and technological institute in India. BIT Sindri emerged as rank 1 in the East Zone and 9th in engineering colleges of the country in the Internshala Annual College Ranking 2023.

== History ==
BIT Sindri was established in 1949 as College of Mechanical and Electrical Engineering, Sindri with temporary campus at Patna and affiliated to Patna University. It was shifted to its permanent campus at Sindri in Dhanbad District a year later, where it was renamed as Bihar Institute of Technology, Sindri. After reorganisation of Patna University and establishment of Ranchi University in 1960, it was affiliated to Ranchi University. BIT Sindri was later affiliated to Vinoba Bhave University after establishment of Vinoba Bhave University at Hazaribagh in September 1992. Currently, it is affiliated to Jharkhand University of Technology.

== Administration ==
BIT Sindri owned and administered by the Government of Jharkhand and run by the Department of Higher and Technical Education through Directorate of Technical Education.

At the institutional level, BIT Sindri is administrated by the Director of the institute, who is the chief academic and executive officer of the BIT Sindri. The Director is appointed by the Department of Higher and Technical Education Government of Jharkhand. The Director of the institute is the executive head of the Institution.

The Director is responsible for overall administration of the institute and executing the institute's activities and is supported by the Six Deans as well as the heads of departments & centers and several Prof.In-Charge of their respective sections and cells.

== Academics ==
The institute continued to be affiliated with Vinoba Bhave University until 2017. From 2018 onwards, the institute has been affiliated with the Jharkhand University of Technology (JUT), Ranchi, the foundations of which were laid down by the former Hon'ble president of India, Shri Pranab Mukherjee. All courses are approved by the All India Council of Technical Education. The institute currently conducts graduate and postgraduate courses in ten disciplines of engineering which are supported by three departments of natural sciences, one department each of earth sciences and humanities.

- Engineering Disciplines:
  - Mechanical Engineering
  - Electrical Engineering
  - Production Engineering
  - Civil Engineering
  - Metallurgical Engineering
  - Computer Science and Engineering
  - Computer Science and Engineering (Cyber Security)
  - Electronics and Communication Engineering
  - Information Technology
  - Chemical Engineering
  - Mining Engineering
- Natural Sciences:
  - Physics
  - Chemistry
  - Mathematics
- Earth Sciences
  - Geology and Geoscience
- Humanities

Currently, postgraduate students are admitted to the Department of Mechanical Engineering and Department of Electrical Engineering only. Admission to undergraduate courses were earlier based on ranks in Jharkhand Engineering Entrance Competitive Exam(JEECE), conducted by Jharkhand Combined Entrance Competitive Examination(JCECE) Board. The JCECEB announced in April 2019 that admissions to the institute shall be based on scores in JEE-Main, a national level engineering entrance examination conducted by the National Testing Agency or NTA.

BIT Sindri is known for its strong core engineering departments, particularly Mechanical and Electrical Engineering. A notable number of its graduates regularly clear the competitive Indian Engineering Services exam conducted by the Union Public Service Commission.

== Campus ==
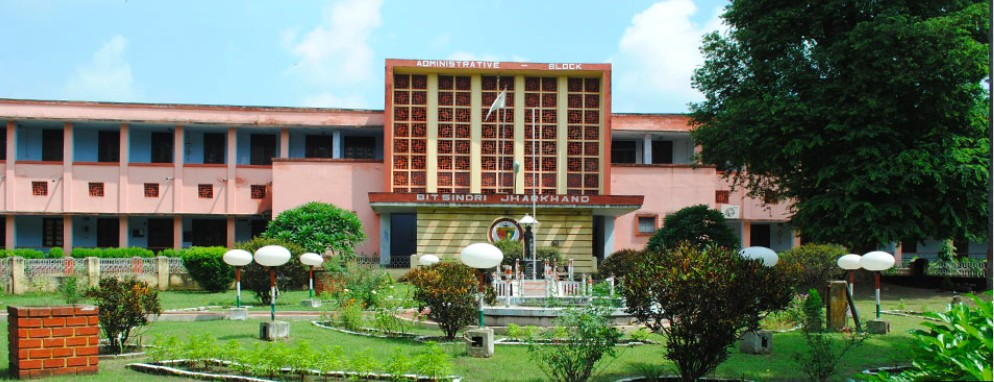
BITS Administrative Building

The Institute campus spreads over an area of 450 acres of land, located near the eastern bank of Damodar River.

== Rankings ==
University rankings

Engineering – India
- NIRF (2024): 201-300

The National Institutional Ranking Framework (NIRF) ranked the college between 201-300 in the engineering rankings in 2024.

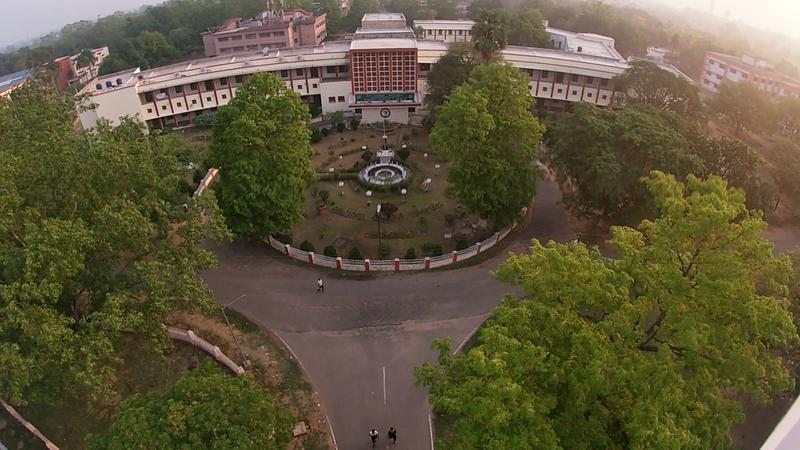
BITS Aerial View

== Alumni ==
Notable alumni include:

- Subodh Das - Material scientist, CEO of Phinix LLC, USA
- Bidhu Jha - Member of the Legislative Assembly of Manitoba for Radisson
- Subodha Kumar - Paul R. Anderson Distinguished Chair Professor, Fox School of Business, Temple University, USA
- Inder Singh Namdhari - 1st Speaker of the Jharkhand Assembly and also a M.P from Chatra, Jharkhand
- B. S. Sahay - Director of the Indian Institute of Management Jammu and former Director of the Indian Institute of Management Raipur

== See also ==
- Department of Higher and Technical Education (Jharkhand)
- List of institutions of higher education in Jharkhand
- Government Engineering College, Palamu
