= Hari Kishan Pippal =

Leather exporter

- Born: 1951 (age 74–75); Agra, Uttar Pradesh, India
- Known for: Dalit businesses

Hari Kishan Pippal is an Indian entrepreneur from Agra, India. He is the managing director of People's Group, a company that owns a hospital, a shoe export factory, an auto dealership, and a publication house. He is noted for creating successful businesses as a member of the Dalit community, a marginalised community in India, after starting out in extreme poverty, including working as a rickshaw puller in Agra. He also serves as the president of DICCI.

== Biography ==
Hari Kishan Pippal was born in Jatav (Dalit) community, to Ramsingh Pippal in Agra, India. His father used to run a shoe repair shop where he started working at a young age. When he was in tenth grade, his father died due to a stroke. He was married shortly thereafter, at the age of 12, and worked as a rickshaw puller and later as a daily wage labourer in Agra.

Pippal got a loan of ₹15,000 (US$180) from Punjab National Bank in 1975 to expand his family's shoe shop. He received his first large order from "State Trading Corporation," for ten thousand pairs of shoes. Eventually he launched his own shoe brand known as 'Harrykson.'

=== Business ===
H. K. Pippal is managing director of People's Exports (P) Limited and People's Heritage Hospital Ltd., one of the largest private medical facilities in Braj. His leather products consists of Hush Puppies shoes for Bata and are traded to Bulgaria, England and other countries.

He also owns a Honda dealership, a banquet hall and a publication house in Agra region. He has a turnover of more than ₹100 crore (US$12 million). He is also the president of DICCI.

He even contested in 2012 Uttar Pradesh Legislative Assembly elections from Agra Cantonment on a Congress ticket.

== Recognition ==
Pippal was featured in the books, 'Defying the Odds: The Rise of Dalit Entrepreneurs' written by Devesh Kapur, D Shyam Babu and Chandra Bhan Prasad, Dalit Millionaires' by Milind Khandekar.
