= Malkit Chand =

Indian Dalit entrepreneur from Ludhiana

Malkit Chand Janagal (born c. 1962) is an Indian entrepreneur and founder of Janagal Exports, a Ludhiana-based T-shirt manufacturing company. He is noted for his success as a Dalit entrepreneur, having built a successful business after starting his career as a tailor.

== Biography ==
Malkit was born in 1962 in Ludhiana where he was eldest of the six siblings. His father, Mansa was a farm worker in Bore, a village 20 kilometres (12 mi) outside Ludhiana, but moved to the city to start a tailoring business.

Chand studied in Ludhiana where he finished his twelfth grade schooling in 1979. He saw no room for growth in family business and sought other enterprises, eventually accepting a job at a T-shirt manufacturing company. His family disapproved of his choice.

Chand was later promoted to the position of a master cutter in a hosiery factory in Ludhiana, Punjab. He later founded his own garment manufacturing business, Janagal Exports. The company manufactures T-shirts that are exported to countries in Europe and Africa. As of 2014, his business had a reported turnover of Rs 80 crore.

== Recognition ==
Chand's entrepreneurial journey is featured in several books. He was one of the featured profiles in the 2014 book Defying the Odds: The Rise of Dalit Entrepreneurs, co-authored by Devesh Kapur, D. Shyam Babu, and Chandra Bhan Prasad, and 2013 book Dalit Millionaires: 15 Inspiring Stories by Milind Khandekar.

== See also ==
- Dalit Indian Chamber of Commerce and Industry
