= B. S. Sahay =

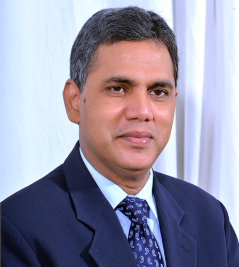
Prof. B. S. Sahay Director, IIM Jammu

Prof. B. S. Sahay is the Founder Director, Indian Institute of Management Jammu. He was the Founder Director of Indian Institute of Management (IIM) Raipur, Management Development Institute (MDI), Gurgaon and Institute of Management Technology (IMT), Ghaziabad. Sahay completed his BTech from BIT Sindri and received his MTech and PhD from Indian Institute of Technology Delhi.

== Career ==
He is currently serving as director of Indian Institute of Management (IIM) Jammu . He was the director of Indian Institute of Management (IIM) Raipur, Management Development Institute (MDI), Gurgaon and Institute of Management Technology (IMT), Ghaziabad. He was the advisor to the chancellor, NMIMS University, Mumbai and mentor to five campuses of NMIMS. He served as the founder director of the Indian Institute of Management, Raipur (IIM, Raipur, India). He was an adjunct professor at the School of International Business, Queensland University of Technology. Prof. Sahay was principal coordinator for the Quality Improvement Programme in Management, sponsored by the All India Council for Technical Education.

Before moving to IMT, Prof. Sahay served at various positions at MDI including Dean (Research), Chairman (Doctoral Programmes), Chairman (PGP) and Professor of Operation Management. He was also an adjunct professor at School of International Business, Queensland University of Technology of Australia and Founder Chairman of Centre for Supply Chain Management. He was the Principle Coordinator for Quality Improvement Program in Management, sponsored by All India Council for Technical Education (AICTE). Under his able leadership, AICTE Launched the Doctoral Programme in Management under QIP Scheme. Earlier Prof. Sahay was instrumental in changing the face of MDI into the faculty-driven top-class research-based institute. He brought in radical changes at MDI and introduce and new HR Policy & Service Rules, Research Policy, New Incentives Schemes for Research and Publication, Faculty Development Programme etc.

Prof. Sahay is on the board of South Eastern Coalfields Limited; All India Institute of Medical Science, Raipur under Ministry of Health & Family Welfare.; BIT Sindri: Chips (Chhattisgarh Infotech and Biotech Promotion Society), Government of Chhattisgarh and Guru Ghashidas Central University Bhilaspur. He has also served on the Board of IIM Raipur, MDI Gurgaon, Indian Institute of Corporate Affairs Under Ministry of Corporate Affairs, National Board of Accreditation; All India Management Association, Association of Management Schools, IMT Ghaziabad, South Asian Quality Systems And Decision Science Institute. He is on the expert committee of Ministry of Human Resource Development, All Indian Council of Technical Education, National Board of Accreditation, and National Task Force of CII on Skill Development.

Prof. Sahay is on the board of the Decision Sciences Institute, Production and Operation Management Society (POMS), USA; INFORMS, USA and the All India Management Association, and Indian Institute of Corporate Affairs, He is on the advisory board of several universities and organisations and a Fellow of the Indian Institution of Industrial Engineering.

Prof. Sahay organized an International Conference on Humanitarian Logistics, ICHL2013. The Conference was recognized and awarded organizations for their significant contribution in disaster preparedness, management and recovery. He has organised Global Summit on Corporate Social Responsibility, GSCSR2015 jointly with IICA New Delhi and NLSIU Bangalore. Prof. Sahay is also working in the area of school education leadership and quality management. He worked towards health care and upliftment of schedule caste and scheduled tribes in the state of Chhattisgarh.

== Awards ==
B. S. Sahay received Alumni Association Award for Outstanding Contribution to National Development for the year 2010–2011. He received the Distinguished Alumnus Award 2010 from the Birsa Institute of Technology Sindri at the Diamond Jubilee Celebrations held on 20 November 2010. Prof. Sahay has been honored by IIT Delhi Alumni Association and has been given "IIT Delhi Alumni Association Award for Outstanding Contribution to National Development" (2011). Prof. Sahay received Honorary Fellow of Indian Institute of Material Management (2014) and Indian Institute of Industrial Engineering (IIIE), CSR Award for Excellence (2015) and Amity Academic Excellence Award (2016). Recently he was awarded Lifetime Achievement Award, 2017 by India CSR.

== Research ==
Prof. Sahay has published and presented over 200 research papers in International/national journals and conferences. He has authored/edited 22 books in the area of Supply Chain Management, Humanitarian and Logistics, World-class Manufacturing, Total Quality Management and Productivity Management. Prof. Sahay is a member of the editorial boards of the International Journal of Logistics Management, Supply Chain Management, Journal of Enterprise Information Management, Business Process Management Journal, International Journal of Services and Standards, International Journal of Mobile Learning and Organisation, and Journal of Indian Business Research.

He was the Founder Editor of International Journal of Value Chain, Editorial Advisory Board Member of International Journal of International Physical Distribution and Logistics Management Journal of Enterprise Information Management, International Journal of Services and Standards, International Journal of Mobile Learning and Guest Editor of International Journal of Physical Distribution and Logistics Management, International Journal of Service Technology and Management.
