= Sindri (Dhanbad) =

- Town
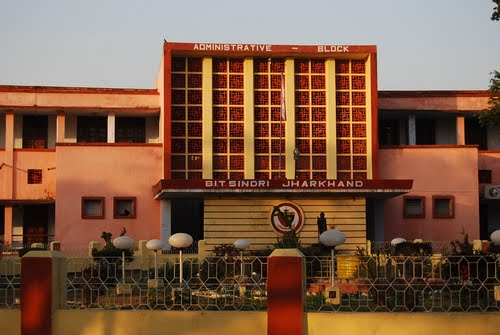
- BIT Sindri

- Location in Jharkhand, India Sindri (India)
- Coordinates: 23.6805°N 86.4874°E
- Country: India
- State: Jharkhand
- District: Dhanbad

Government
  - Type: Representative Democracy

Area
  - Total: 24 km^{2} (9.3 sq mi)
- Elevation: 178 m (584 ft)

Population (2001)
  - Total: 80,000
  - Density: 3,300/km^{2} (8,600/sq mi)

Languages
  - Official: Hindi, Urdu and Kudmali
- Time zone: UTC+5:30 (IST)
- PIN: 828204
- Telephone code: 91 (0)326
- Vehicle registration: JH-10
- Website: dhanbad.nic.in

Sindri is a Town in Dhanbad in Dhanbad Sadar subdivision of Dhanbad district in Jharkhand state, India.

== Overview ==
Sindri is an industrial semi urban township within the Dhanbad municipal limits of the Dhanbad District of Jharkhand state/. Sindri was well known because of a large Fertilizer factory (Fertilizer Corporation of India Limited - FCI, closed in 2002) conceived here in the early industrialized India. It was also known for few other companies situated here such as ACC Limited (formerly Associated Cement Company Limited), Coal Mines of The Indian Iron and Steel Company Limited (IISCo), which has been taken over by Steel Authority of India Limited (SAIL) and Projects and Development India Limited (PDIL), formerly Planning & Development Division of FCI and Coal Mines of the Bharat Coking Coal Limited, a subsidiary company of Coal India Limited. Another subject of topographical importance is the Damodar river which acted both as source of water and electricity for the township. A hydro-power project called Damodar Valley Corporation (DVC) is located at Maithon and Panchet near Sindri. DVC supplies eco-friendly electricity to some its neighbouring states like West Bengal, Bihar and Orissa. Sindri is also well known for the BIT Sindri which was earlier known as Bihar Institute of Technology later on its abbreviation changed to Birsa Institute of Technology when state is transformed from Bihar to Jharkhand.

== Origin of its name ==
As per the records of the now-closed fertilizer plant (FCIL), the name Sindri was a form of the word Sindoori (Vermilion). Also the meaning of sindri in Hindi is sundari. The name is said to be given by the local tribals because of the vermilion colored soil found here. Technically the type of soil available in the area is Laterite which has got a vermilion coloured or reddish hue.

The word Sindri is also said to be a part of the Mundari lexicon. Mundari is a language spoken by the indigenous people who have lived in and around this place for a long time. It roughly translates into "Ridge" or "Frontier." There are some evidences available that centuries ago the Santhals, Mundas and Kudmis inhabited the banks of the Sindhu River.

== History ==
Sindri was a place with rich reserves of flora and fauna. The place was initially occupied by the local tribals which later on attracted people from neighbouring states. The chapter of its industrialization started when it was selected as best option for a fertilizer factory due to its apt geographical conditions in the year 1944 by the Viceroy's Executive Council following recommendations submitted in November 1944 by a three members technical mission consisting of G S Gowing and J Rigg, both of Imperial Chemical Industries and T H Riley of the Association of British Chemical Plants Manufacturers, Britain for setting up a single large fertilizer factory to produce 3,50,000 tons Ammonium Sulphate per annum with Gypsum as raw material.

A separate project organisation was set by the Government of India in 1945 under the Chief Technical Advisor, Brig. M H Cox. To end the system of diarchy and to replace the same with one of autonomy, a company named Sindri Fertilizers and Chemicals Limited was formed under the Companies Act, which came into being in December 1951 as the first Public Sector Company, wholly owned and governed by the Government of India.

The production of Ammonium Sulphate in the factory was started on 31 October 1951 and the factory inaugurated in March 1952. In his inauguration speech, the then Prime Minister of India, Jawahar Lal Nehru said that he was not just inaugurating a fertilizer factory but he was inaugurating a temple of modern India. The Company Sindri Fertilizers and Chemicals Limited was merged in January 1961 with another fertilizer manufacturing company Hindustan Chemical and Fertilizers Limited floated by the Government of India in July 1959 to form a bigger Company the Fertilizer Corporation of India Limited.

The factory was first in India to produce Ammonium Sulphate (1951), Urea (1959), Ammonium Nitrate-Sulphate, commonly called the Double salt (1959) and was the first fertilizer factory to have its own captive power plant in 1951 and to introduce planning, research and development facilities in 1951. The raw materials used initially for its final products were gypsum, coal and naptha.

A number of new plants were added to the factory as need arose time to time. A rationalization scheme was completed in 1976 and a modernization project was commissioned in 1979 with product-mix of ammonia, urea, nitric acid, ammonium nitrate and ammonium bicarbonate with low-sulphur heavy stock/furnace oil and coal as basic raw materials.

In 1978, the Government of India decided to reorganise the Fertilizer Corporation of India Limited and the National Fertilizer Corporation Limited, which was incorporated for fertilizer projects at Panipat and Bhatinda into five new companies. The Sindri fertilizer factory continued with the Fertilizer Corporation of India Limited along with aged-old Gorakhpur (Uttar Pradesh) Plant and three coal based fertilizer projects at Talcher (Orissa), Ramagundam (Andhra Pradesh) and Korba (Chhattisgarh) and newer plants and its Planning & Development Division were included in new companies, namely, Rashtriya Chemicals & Fertilizer Limited (RCF), National Fertilizers Limited (NFL), Hindustan Fertilizer Corporation Limited (HFC) and Fertilizer (Planning & Development) India Limited (FPDIL), latter renamed as Projects and Development India Limited (PDIL).

The Sindri fertilizer plant operated consistently in profit till 1967-68 and again in 1969-70. But in spite of modernisation, the factory could not maintain profit thereafter even after exceeding rated (attainable) capacity mainly because of unscientific division of the company, higher production cost and comparatively lower sale price of fertilizers, mounting wage bills, higher maintenance expenditure due to ageing of plants, availability of raw materials of low specifications/quality large infrastructure cost, and eventually the Government of India decided to close of the factory operation in September 2002.

Though the fertilizer plant was, of late, not an eventual commercial success but it certainly provided a wonderful social environment for many generations of people during its existence. The Bihar Institute of Technology now renamed as Birsa Institute of Technology was also established to meet the growing demand of technology experts in this new industrialized area. The institute still remains as one of the premier institutions for technical education in the state of Bihar and Jharkhand.

== Geography ==
Cities, towns and locations in the southern portion of Dhanbad Sadar subdivision in Dhanbad district
MC: Municipal Corporation, CT: Census Town, N: Neighbourhood, R: Rural/ Urban centre
Owing to space constraints in the small map, the actual locations in a larger map may vary slightly

=== Location ===
Sindri is located at 22.8°N 85.98°E. It has an average elevation of 178 metres (583) feet

Note: The map alongside presents some of the notable locations in the area. All places marked in the map are linked in the larger full screen map.

The earlier notified area was combined with other urban units to form Dhanbad Municipal Corporation in 2006.

Sindri is spread over parts of Ward No. 52, 53 and 54 of Dhanbad Municipal Corporation.

=== The region ===
The region shown in the map is a part of the undulating uplands bustling with coalmines. The Damodar River, the most important river of the Chota Nagpur Plateau, flows along the southern border. A major part of the area shown in the map is part of Dhanbad Municipal Corporation, an urban area. The places in the DMC area are marked as neighbourhoods. The western part of the region shown in the map is covered by Dhanbad (community development block). 57% of the population of Dhanbad CD block reside in rural areas and 43% reside in urban areas, The east-central part of the region shown in the map is covered by Baliapur (community development block). 86% of the population of Baliapur CD block reside in rural areas and 14% reside in urban areas. The places in the CD block areas are marked mostly as census towns. Three operational areas of BCCL operate fully within the region – Pootkee Balihari Area, Lodna Area and Eastern Jharia Area. The Moonidih sector of Western Jharia Area also operates in the region.

=== Police station ===
There is a police station at Sindri.

== Connectivity ==
Sindri is well connected by road and rail to the district headquarters of Dhanbad and is very close to the Bokaro Steel City just 60 km (37 mi). The road between Sindri and Dhanbad has usually been in a state of disarray due to the regular movements of lorries loaded with fertilizer, cement, coal and sand. There is a local train available between the place and the district headquarters many times a day. There are three small railway stations/halts in the 27 kilometre long broad gauge line between Sindri Town and Dhanbad Junction namely - Sindri Marshalling Yard, Sindri (Block Hut), Rakhitpur, Pradhan Khanta and Dokra Block Halt. Visitors wanting to reach the township should not confuse between Sindri (Block Hut) and Sindri Town railway station. The rail line connects Sindri (via Dhanbad) to the all-important cities of India which includes Kolkata, New Delhi, Mumbai, Chennai, Jabalpur, Patna, Ranchi, Bokaro, Gwalior, Nagpur, Pune Jammu, Ahmedabad and regional industrial city of Jamshedpur with the most important train through Sindri being the Subarnarekha Express.

Kolkata (260 km (160 mi)), Ranchi (180 km (110 mi)) and Patna (290 km (180 mi)) provide air connectivity to Sindri which connects it to Delhi, Mumbai, Chennai, Nagpur, Kolhapur, Pune, Nagpur, Pune, Indore and Hyderabad.

== Technical institute ==
Founded in 1949, BIT Sindri is a technical institution offering undergraduate and postgraduate courses in ten branches of engineering and technology, approved by All India Council of Technical Education, New Delhi. The Institute has campus spread in nearly 450 Acres, spared by the FCIL Sindri, and operates under the aegis of Department of Science & Technology, Govt. of Jharkhand, Ranchi. BIT Sindri and was formerly known as Bihar Institute of Technology, Sindri which was renamed as Birsa Institute of Technology (BIT), Sindri after the creation of Jharkhand state in November 2000. The Institute had been affiliated with Vinoba Bhave University, Hazaribagh till 2018. From 2018 batch, it got affiliated with Jharkhand University of Technology, Ranchi. It is the only one government aided institute in Jharkhand.

== Localities ==
The township of Sindri can be divided into three different areas. The first part was the residential area for the employees of FCIL and PDIL, the second part was occupied by the employees of ACC. The third part was occupied by the students and staff of Bihar Institute of Technology, in short BIT Sindri. The division of the town in terms of localities can be done as - Domgarh, Rohrabandh, Saharpura, Manohartand, Gaushala and Rangamati.

Domgarh was the older tribal village of Sindri, or better associated as the residence of Doms. Other localities like Rohrabandh, Domgarh, Shaharpura and Rangamati were all housing colonies for the employees of FCIL and PDIL. Gausala was the area just outside the campus of BIT Sindri.

The Sindri township was well-planned township with many amenities and spacious Quarters with lawns in front and space for kitchen garden in the backyard. Trees like gulmohar, Kadam, Nim, Chhatim flanked the streets. The town in the seventies had 4- Dispensaries and a main Hospital with 206 beds, Kalyan Kendra - The Sports club, Officer's club - A club for FCI executives, Rabindra Bhawan - a place for cultural conglomeration. Power supply was made available to the township locally produced in FCI Power Plants. Damodar river was the source of water for the entire township. A water purification system was designed to supply water in the township.

There was a park called 7 Lakes. As the name suggests, the park had seven lakes neatly bordered with lush green bushes and trees. It was a huge park with children play area and few small animals in enclosure such as deer, rabbits, parrots, peacocks. On the new year day, every year the residents would occupy different parts of the park to have a picnic with friends and family. The reminiscence of the park can still be found but it is not as maintained as it used to be in the past. After closure of the FCIL factory, the electricity and water supply from its Water purification plant has been limited.

== Social life ==
The fertilizer plant brought together people from many different locations of India to work in various roles. Sindri was truly the mixing pot for various cultures and regions in India. It was not unusual to find a Bengali, a Bihari, a Sikh, a Tamil, a Kannada and a Jain family living in the same block of the town. The communal harmony and social acceptance which was instilled in youngsters growing up in the town made it much easier for them to adapt to a diverse culture. The greatest contribution of Sindri Fertilizer Plant may be in creating a generation of Indians born with multi-cultural values. Such multi-cultured adaptive people are now spread all over the world.

Shaharpura hosted the downtown shopping area where established dry goods merchants, tailors and butchers shared their space with farmers and other small-time merchants. Every Monday, Wednesday and Saturday a lively open air market was held featuring fresh locally raised produce, poultry and locally crafted artefacts. Wandering minstrels and traditional medicine men from as far away as Afghanistan brought with them unexpected services and concoctions like low cost street side tooth extraction and "lizard oil" for arthritis sufferers that was brewed in-situ at low heat in wide mouthed vats of oil in which a few exotic looking lizards lounged around (unharmed) for the afternoon. Marathon bicyclists occasionally came to town to ride around in circles for days on end without setting their foot down. This form of theatre elevated everyday activities like shaving, showering and eating to heroic levels and got the salaried men of Sindri to spare some change for their more venturesome if less fortunate compatriots. The open air market was Sindri's window to the rest of India and brought a splash of colour to an otherwise pastel town.

Sindri was also known for its active socially conscious Ladies Club and Vanita Samaj, two prominent organizations for the wives of the officers in Sindri.

Literature in different languages thrived in Sindri with organizations like Hindi Sahitya Parishad, Vidyapati Parishad, Urdu-Hindi Sangam and Anjuman-i-Urdu. Various Mushaira's (Urdu Poetry) and Kavi samelans were held in between 1965 and 1995. From a literature perspective, this was the glorious era of Sindri due to people who worked actively for conducting literary activities in the town, specially in the field of Hindi literature.

Theatre, Drama and Music had a significant role in the social lives and the Bengali community played a significant part in this. This part of Sindri life was heavily influenced by Calcutta (now Kolkata, just 250 km away). Ajanta Kala Mandir was a significant part of the children growing up in Sindri. Children learnt Kathak dance and Hindustani Classical music. In its days of glory, this institution had won many awards for Sindri.

The Kalyan Kendra (Welfare Centre) located between Rohrabandh and Shaharpura had a sprawling ground adjacent to it. The complex boasted of a traditional gym and a modern one too. Later a swimming pool was built as part of this complex. It was the venue for Independence Day and Republic Day parades and location of choice for staging plays and poetry readings by groups that believed that watching movies (along with chewing tobacco, imbibing tea, gambling and playing chess or cards,) was a bad habit. The one western influence that seeped into Kalyan Kendra was table tennis and of course carrom board. The Bengali literati staged night long yatras and durga pujas, the Bihari Literati (and those from Eastern UP) staged Kavi Samelans and observed Chaat, the Tamil literati arranged for Kacheris and staged Ayyappan Puja.

== Educational institutes ==
In order to provide educational services to children of its employees and wards of other residents of Sindri and nearby localities, the FCIL Management started the first school in Sindri in 1948. The management of the fertilizer factory ran seven Rajendra schools, - three high Schools affiliated to the Jharkhand Academic Council, four middle schools following curricula under the Jharkhand State Education Policy in Shaharpura and Domgarh areas of the Township, all named after Dr. Rajendra Prasad, the first President of the independent India and one English medium integrated senior secondary school, Model English High School, affiliated to the Central Board of Secondary Education, New Delhi in Rohrabandh area of the Township. Rajendra High School for girls in Saharpura area were imparting education exclusively to girl students.

In addition to the FCIL managed schools, the FCIL Management established various private schools viz.

- De Nobili School (CISCE affiliated Council for the Indian School Certificate Examinations chain of schools run by Society of Jesuits ),
- Lions Public School (affiliated to the CBSE Central Board of Secondary Education),
- DAV Public School (managed by the Dayanand Anglo-Vedic College Trust and Management Society, New Delhi)

which also provide excellent education to residents. There are numerous preparatory schools as well, leading among which was Ravindra Parishad.

To provide for higher education to its workers and their wards FCIl Sindri Unit established a co-educational degree college named Sindri College with science, humanities and commerce streams. Sindri College is presently a constituent unit of the State run Vinoba Bhave University, Hazaribagh.

== Current status ==
Sindri fertilizer along with Gorakhpur, Ramagundam, Talchar and Korba of the FCI were referred to Board for Industrial and Financial Reconstruction (BIFR) after being declared sick in 1992. However, when the Government of India failed in submitting any revival proposal for the closed fertilizer units, the BIFR recommended for their closure. The Government of India on 5 September 2002 decided to close down all loss-making fertilizer units of FCI and Hindustan Fertilizer Corporation and lay off all the employees. The employees of Sindri fertilizer factory units were made to retire under Voluntary Separation Scheme (VSS) and the plants were closed in December 2002. The BIFR then referred the case of closed fertilizer units to Delhi High Court for appointing liquidators for selling the assets of the closed units and clearing the dues of different debtors.

Meanwhile, the GAIL planned to lay Natural Gas pipeline from Jagdishpur in Uttar Pradesh to Haldia in West Bengal which would be laid at around 20-25 kilometres from the factory area. Coal Bed Methane (CBM) exploration in the vicinity and factory location amidst coal mines has further added the interest for revival activity of the Sindri fertilizer factory.

In 2004, the Government of India appealed the Delhi High Court to stop the process of liquidation as it intended to revive the closed fertilizer units of the FCI. Later, the Delhi High Court referred back the matter of closed units of FCI to the BIFR for considering revival of the Sindri fertilizer factory along with other closed down units of FCI at Ramagundam, Talcher, Gorakhpur and Korba.

The Government of India in April 2007 decided in principle to revive the closed Sindri fertilizer factory subject to availability of Natural Gas as input.

In 2010, the Government of India has decided to revive the Sindri fertilizer complex with SAIL as strategic partner and setting up a 5.6 MT Steel Plant, 1.15 MT Urea Plant and a 1000 MW Power Plant was contemplated. The SAIL launched special purpose vehicle for the purpose and got the name of the new project registered as SAIL Sindri Projects Limited (SSPL).

The BIFR on 27 June 2013 approved revival of the Sindri Fertilizer Plant along with other closed down units of the Fertilizer Corporation of India Limited (FCI). The BIFR clearance has paved the way for setting up of the industrial complex at a Sindri.

Approved DRS envisaged revival of Sindri unit by SAIL at estimated project cost of Rs. 35,000 Crores. However, not much progress was made due to non-availability of around 3000 Acres of contiguous piece of land for the Steel Plant due to encroachments. In the meantime, the due change in its modernization and expansion plan SAIL has taken a view not to pursue the Sindri Revival project further.

The Government of India has approved in May 2015 to revive the closed Sindri Fertilizer Plant through 'bidding route' with investment of Rs. 6,000 Crores. Accordingly, Bids have been invited from the interested investors, which is due to open in December 2015.

The process of reopening the plant is expected to finish in 2024, with anticipated inauguration by PM Narendra Modi of India.

== Demographics ==
As of 2001 India census, Sindri had a population of 76,827. Males constitute 54% of the population and females 46%. Sindri has an average literacy rate of 68%, higher than the national average of 59.5%: male literacy rate is 77%, and female literacy rate is 57%. In Sindri, 12% of the population is under 6 years of age.
