= Bararee Colliery =

Bararee Colliery is one of the underground mines of Lodna area of Bharat Coking Coal Limited subsidiary of Coal India Limited. The present day Bararee Colliery is formed by amalgamation of the erstwhile two independent units of East India Coal Company, then called Bhulan Section & Bararee Section. Coal mining in these units was started back in 1905 by East India Coal Company. Since then, a number of seams from top most XVI A to VII B seams have been worked through number of outlets. Presently there is only one pit i.e. 6 pit is in operation. It covers a surface area of about 2.64 km^{2}. The average production is about 360 tonnes per day.

Name of Unit	Geological Reserve			Mineable Reserve		
Name of Unit	Coking	Non Coking	Total	Coking	Non Coking	Total
Bararee	34.297	24.647	58.944	7.047	24.647	31.694

== Location ==
Bararee Colliery which includes Bararee and Bhulan section is located in south-eastern part of the Jharia Coalfields. It lies between latitude 94600 N – 97200 N and departure 92600 E – 95800 E. North Latitude 23° 41′ 23″ and 23° 43′ 06″ and East Longitude 86° 26′ 17″ and 86° 24′ 56″. Bararee Colliery has the following boundaries:
North – Jealgora Colliery and Bagdigi Colliery
South – Patherdih Metamorphosis
East – Jeenagora and Joyrampur Colliery
West – Dhanbad – Sindri Road and Tisco Colliery
