= Mannem (surname) =

Mannem (Telugu: మన్నెం) is a Telugu surname. Notable people with the surname include

- Mannem Madhusudana Rao, Indian businessman
- Mannem Nageswara Rao (born 1960), Indian former-interim Director officer of the Central Bureau of Investigation
