= Kalpana Saroj =

Indian Entrepreneur

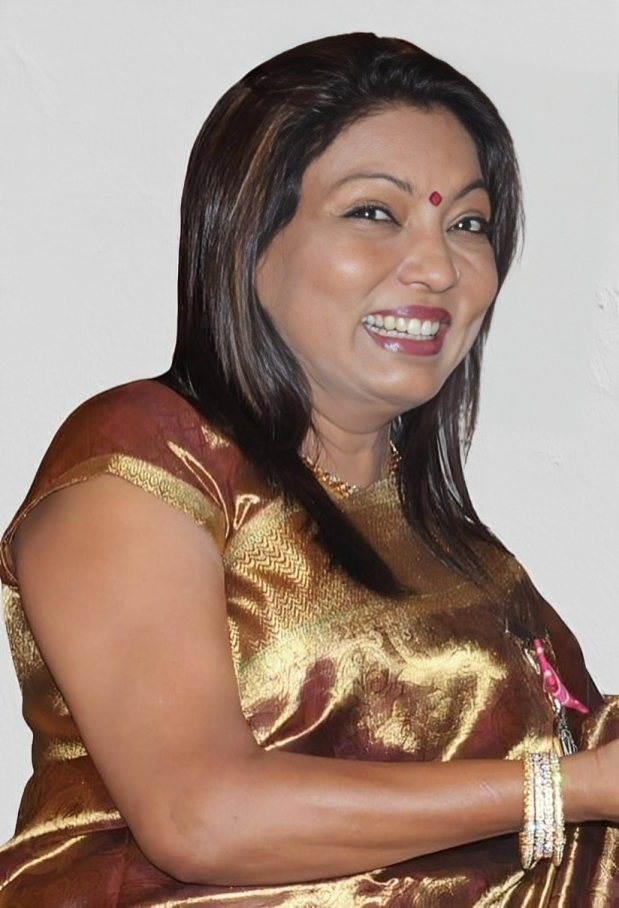
- Kalpana Saroj receiving Padma Shri Award in 2013
- Born: 1961 (age 64–65); Roperkheda, Akola, Maharashtra, India
- Occupations: Business woman & Entrepreneur
- Employer: Kamani Tubes
- Spouse(s): Samir Saroj (m. 1980; died 1989) Shubhkaran
- Children: Timon Saroj, Amar Saroj
- Awards: Padma Shri (2013)

Kalpana Saroj (born 1961) is an Indian businesswoman, entrepreneur, and a TEDx speaker. She serves as the chairperson of Kamani Tubes in Mumbai, India, a manufacturer of copper and copper alloy products. Born into poverty as a member of the Dalit community, she is noted for becoming a successful entrepreneur who bought the distressed assets of Kamani Tubes Company and steered it to profitability. She was awarded the Padma Shri, India's fourth highest civilian honor, in 2013 in the field of trade and industry.

== Early life ==
Saroj was born in 1961 in Roperkheda village in, Akola, Maharashtra, India, to a Marathi Buddhist family, the eldest of three daughters and two sons. Saroj's father served as a police constable at Repatkhed village in Akola. Kalpana Saroj was married at the age of 12 and lived in a slum in Mumbai with her husband's family. After suffering physical abuse at the hands of her husband's family members, she was rescued by her father, left her husband and returned to her village to live with her parents. She attempted suicide after being ostracized by the villagers. At the age of 16, she moved back to Mumbai to live with her uncle. She started working in a garment factory to support her family, reportedly earning less than a dollar a month. Using government loans for scheduled caste people, she successfully started a tailoring business and then a furniture store.

== Entrepreneurial ventures ==
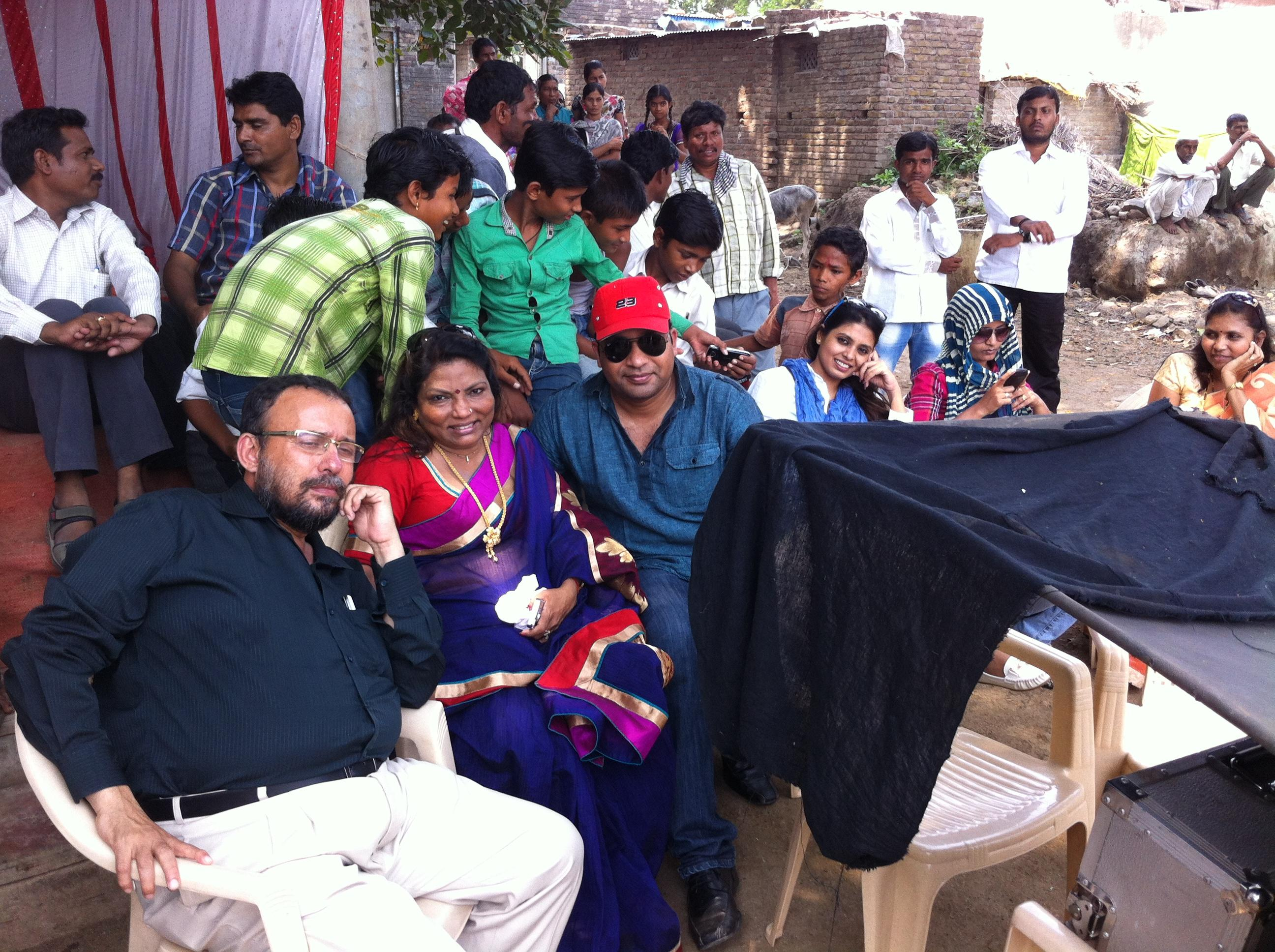
Kalpana, Deelip and Mannan Gore at Khairlanji movie shoot in Akola

She built up a successful real estate business and came to be known for her contacts and entrepreneurial skills. She was on the board of Kamani Tubes when it went into liquidation in 2001, and after taking over the company, she restructured it and brought it back to profit.

Saroj also started KS Film Production and produced her first movie Khairlanjichya Mathyavar (Marathi) which was dubbed in English, Telugu and Hindi. It was produced by Deelip Mhaske, Jyoti Reddy and Mannan Gore under Kalpana Saroj's banner.

According to her own estimates, she has personal assets worth $112 million.

== Personal life ==
Saroj is a Buddhist. She is inspired by and follows teachings of Dr. Ambedkar. In 1980, she remarried Samir Saroj at the age of 22, with whom she has a son, Amar Saroj, and a daughter, Seema Saroj. In 1989, her husband died, and Saroj inherited his steel cupboard manufacturing business.

== Awards and recognition ==
Kalpana Saroj was awarded the Padma Shri for Trade and Industry in 2013.

She was appointed to the board of directors of Bhartiya Mahila Bank, a bank primarily for women, by the Government of India. She also serves on the board of governors of Indian Institute of Management Bangalore.

She was one of the featured profiles in Milind Khandekar's book "Dalit Millionaires: 15 Inspiring Stories," and has been a guest speaker at TEDx events.

== See also ==
- Savitaben Parmar
- Ashok Khade
- Dalit Indian Chamber of Commerce and Industry

== Books ==
- Khandekar, M. (2013). Dalit Millionaires: 15 Inspiring Stories. Penguin Books Limited (published 15 December 2013). ISBN 978-93-5118-583-3.
