= Ratibhai Makwana =

Indian dalit industrialist from Gujarat

- Occupations: Industrialist, Entrepreneur
- Known for: Founder of Gujarat Pickers Industries
- Awards: Business Excellence National Award (2015)

Ratibhai Makwana, also known as Ratilal Makwana, is an Indian industrialist and entrepreneur from Gujarat. He is the founder and chairman of Gujarat Pickers, a company involved in the trade of polymers and petrochemicals. As a member of the Dalit community, he is noted for building a successful enterprise despite facing significant caste-based discrimination. His story was featured in the 2013 book Dalit Millionaires: 15 Inspiring Stories by Milind Khandekar and the 2014 book Defying the Odds: The Rise of Dalit Entrepreneurs.

== Career ==
Makwana's family was involved in business before him. His father, Gala Bhai, operated a tannery on land gifted by a local ruler in Bhavnagar. The family business later shifted to producing pickers, a component used in textile power looms, which were traditionally made from animal hides, a trade often associated with Dalit communities. Makwana joined his father in this business, overseeing production while his father handled sales across the country.

He later founded Gujarat Pickers Industries in 1962 as a partnership firm manufacturing pickers and other textile accessories. The business eventually diversified into distributing plastics, polymers, and petrochemicals. Banks were unwilling to provide him with loans, and he experienced social ostracism, including being served tea from a distance and being expelled from a temple. According to one account, when he was offered an agency for the Indian Petrochemicals Corporation Limited, the local plastics industry boycotted the inauguration ceremony.

Gujarat Pickers eventually grew into a major enterprise, with reported annual turnovers ranging from ₹200 crore (US$21 million) crore to ₹750 crore (US$78 million) crore at different times.

== Recognition ==
His story is one of several included in the book Defying the Odds: The Rise of Dalit Entrepreneurs co-authored by Devesh Kapur. He was also featured in the 2013 book Dalit Millionaires: 15 Inspiring Stories by Milind Khandekar. The chapter focusing on him is titled "Beating the Boycott," detailing his struggle against caste-based opposition in the business world.
