= Central Institute of Plastics Engineering & Technology, Khunti =

Autonomous plastics engineering institute in Ranchi

Central Institute of Plastics Engineering & Technology
- केंद्रीय प्लास्टिक अभियांत्रिकी एवं प्रौद्योगिकी संस्थान
- Type: Public
- Established: 2017; 9 years ago
- Affiliations: All India Council for Technical Education
- Director-General: Shishir Sinha
- Students: 800
- Location: Ranchi, India; 23.3809201°N 85.285165°E
- Campus: Urban
- Website: www.cipet.gov.in

The Central Institute of Plastics Engineering & Technology, Khunti (CIPET Khunti) is an autonomous public learning and research institution located at Hehal, Ranchi the capital city of Jharkhand, India. It functions under department of chemicals and petrochemicals, Ministry of Chemicals and Fertilizers, Government of India which was established in the year of 2017 and is one of 15 Institute under Central Institute of Plastics Engineering and Technology (India). The Institute offers Doctoral Programme in Polymer Science, Material Science and Plastics Engineering, Masters, Under Graduate Programs in affiliation with Ranchi University, Ranchi accredited by All India Council of Technical Education.

== History ==
CIPET was established at Ranchi in June 2017 with UNDP assistance. It receives funding support from the administration ministry, OPEC, UNIDO and the World Bank. It was with the initiative of the Government of India plans to establish 11 CIPET centers across the nation. It aims to develop skills of the youths and generate employment. CIPET Khunti was approved by Scientific and Industrial Investigation Department. This was an achievement for the youth of Jharkhand who work in the field of plastic engineering. With the effort of Ministry of Chemicals and Fertilizers a centres of the Central Institute of Plastics Engineering and Technology (CIPET) was set up in Jharkhand.

== Campus ==
The temporary campus of CIPET Ranchi is located at Hehal on itki Road. It lies near to educational institute of Women ITI and DAV Public School. The permanent campus is being built over 15 acres of land at knowledge city in khunti near Ranchi.

== Academic programs ==
Diploma programs

- Diploma in plastic mould technology (DPMT)
- Diploma in plastic technology (DPT)

Postgraduate programs

- Post-graduate diploma in plastic processing and testing (PGT in PPT)

== See also ==
- Central Institute of Plastics Engineering & Technology, Hajipur
- Central Institute of Plastics Engineering & Technology, Murthal
- Central Institute of Plastics Engineering & Technology, Bhubaneswar
