= Tisra =

- Neighbourhood in Dhanbad
- Location in Jharkhand, India Tisra (India)
- Coordinates: 23.72°N 86.44°E
- Country: India
- State: Jharkhand
- District: Dhanbad

Population (2001)
  - Total: 53,547

Languages
  - Official: Hindi, Urdu
- Time zone: UTC+5:30 (IST)
- Vehicle registration: JH
- Website: dhanbad.nic.in

Tisra is a neighbourhood in Dhanbad in Dhanbad Sadar subdivision of Dhanbad district in Jharkhand state, India.

== Geography ==
Cities, towns and locations in the southern portion of Dhanbad Sadar subdivision in Dhanbad district
MC: Municipal Corporation, CT: Census Town, N: Neighbourhood, R: Rural/ Urban centre
Owing to space constraints in the small map, the actual locations in a larger map may vary slightly

=== Location ===
Tisra is located at 23.72°N 86.44°E.

Note: The map alongside presents some of the notable locations in the area. All places marked in the map are linked in the larger full screen map.

The earlier census town was combined with other urban units to form Dhanbad Municipal Corporation in 2006.

Tisra is part of Ward No. 46 of Dhanbad Municipal Corporation.

=== Overview ===
The region shown in the map is a part of the undulating uplands bustling with coalmines. The Damodar River, the most important river of the Chota Nagpur Plateau, flows along the southern border. A major part of the area shown in the map is part of Dhanbad Municipal Corporation, an urban area. The places in the DMC area are marked as neighbourhoods. The western part of the region shown in the map is covered by Dhanbad (community development block). 57% of the population of Dhanbad CD block reside in rural areas and 43% reside in urban areas, The east-central part of the region shown in the map is covered by Baliapur (community development block). 86% of the population of Baliapur CD block reside in rural areas and 14% reside in urban areas. The places in the CD block areas are marked mostly as census towns. Three operational areas of BCCL operate fully within the region – Pootkee Balihari Area, Lodna Area and Eastern Jharia Area. The Moonidih sector of Western Jharia Area also operates in the region.

=== Police station ===
There is a police station at TisraR.

== Demographics ==
As of 2001 India census, Tisra had a population of 53,547. Males constitute 56% of the population and females 44%. Tisra has an average literacy rate of 58%, lower than the national average of 59.5%. The male literacy rate is 68%, and the female literacy rate is 44%. In Tisra, 15% of the population is under 6 years of age.

== Economy ==
Lodna Area of BCCL comprises 5 underground mines, 2 departmentally operated open cast mines and 1 outsourced OC mine. The underground mines are: Lodna, Bagdigi, Joyrampur, North Tisra and Bararee. The Jealgora underground mine has been closed down and dewatered from the surface. The open cast mines are: NT-ST, Jeenagora (departmental) and Jeenagora Patch I (outsourced). Lodna Area has mineable reserves of 46.368 million tonnes of coking coal and 618.6 million tonnes of non-coking coal.

== Healthcare ==
Bastacola Area has a 50-bedded Regional Hospital at Tisra.Lodna Area Regional Hospital of BCCL is located at Jealgora.
