= Savitaben Parmar =

Indian entrepreneur

- Other names: Savitaben Kolsawallah
- Occupation: Entrepreneur

Savitaben Parmar is an Indian social entrepreneur from Ahmedabad, India. She is known for starting a successful business despite her background of poverty and caste discrimination as a member of the Dalit community. Her biography was profiled as one of the fifteen stories in the book Dalit Millionaires: 15 Inspiring Stories by Milind Khandekar.

== Biography ==
Parmar lives in Ahmedabad, Gujarat. She belongs to a Dalit community. Her husband worked as a bus conductor.

Parmar began her business career to support her family due to financial constraints. She initially gathered and sold half-burnt coals (cinders) discarded by textile mills in Ahmedabad, a trade which earned her the name "Savitaben Kolsawala" (Savitaben the coal-seller). She eventually expanded her operations from trading coal to manufacturing. She established a business producing ceramic tiles in 1991, which grew into a profitable enterprise. As of 2015, her tile manufacturing business had an annual turnover of ₹50 crore and employed over 200 people.

== See also ==
- Ashok Khade
- Kalpana Saroj
