= Devesh =

Indian masculine name

Devesh (Sanskrit: देवेश, romanized: Deveśa, lit. 'God of devas') is an Indian masculine name. It literally translates to "god of the devas". It is an epithet of Krishna, Indra, and Shiva.

== Etymology ==
Deva (देव in Devanagari script, pronounced [ˈd̪eːʋə]) is the Sanskrit word for god or deity, and īśa (ईश in Devanagari script) is also a Sanskrit word for king or lord.

== Literature ==
In the Bhagavad Gita chapter 11, verse number 25, Arjuna addresses Krishna by this name:

danṣhṭrā-karālāni cha te mukhāni
dṛiṣhṭvaiva kālānala-sannibhāni
diśho na jāne na labhe cha śharma
prasīda deveśha jagan-nivāsa

— Bhagavad Gita, Chapter 11, Verse 25

== In different scripts ==
Name in script	Language	Script type
देवेश	Hindi and Nepali	Devanagari
தேவேஷ்	Tamil	
ದೆವೆಶ್	Kannada	Kannada
Devesh	English	Latin

== Notable people ==
- Devesh Chandra Thakur (born 1953), Indian politician
- Devesh Chauhan (born 1981), Indian field hockey player
- Devesh Kapur, South Asian Studies professor
