= Fertiliser Corporation of India =

Indian government-owned corporation

Fertiliser Corporation of India Limited
- Type: Central Public Sector Undertaking
- Founded: 1961
- Headquarters: Noida, India
- Products: Fertilisers
- Owner: Ministry of Chemicals and Fertilizers, Government of India
- Subsidiaries: Hindustan Fertiliser Corporation

Fertiliser Corporation of India Limited (FCIL) is a public sector undertaking in India under the ownership of the Ministry of Chemicals and Fertilizers, Government of India.

== Formation of FCIL ==
The first state-owned fertiliser unit was set up in 1951 at Sindri followed by units in Nangal and Trombay. FCIL was then incorporated in 1961 by the Government of India consolidating several public sector fertiliser units into a single undertaking.

== Reorganization ==
In 1978, FCIL was reorganized and following new entities were formed – Hindustan Fertilizer Corporation (HFCL), Rashtriya Chemicals and Fertilisers (RCF) and Projects and Development India Limited (PDIL).

As part of reorganization, Nangal plant was transferred to NFL, Trombay plant was transferred to RCF while Namrup, Haldia, Barauni and Durgapur plants was transferred to HFCL. Namrup plant was later transferred to Brahmaputra Valley Fertiliser Corporation Limited (BVFCL). Production units in Gorakhpur, Sindri, Talcher and Ramagundam along with the proposed unit at Korba were retained with FCIL.

== Closure of Production Units ==
In November 1992, FCIL along with HFCL was referred to BIFR and was declared sick under The Sick Industrial Companies (Special Provisions) Act, 1985. The production units of FCIL were completely shutdown in between 1990 and 2002 by the Government of India as they were incurring heavy losses. Jodhpur Mining Organization which was also a part of FCIL was hived-off into FAGMIL. The main reasons for the loss incurred by FCIL were higher incidence of interest, higher input costs especially the power tariffs by the respective state electricity boards and the associated raw materials, and higher consumption which was not reimbursed by the FCIL. The main products of FCIL were ammonia, urea, nitric acid, ammonium bicarbonate, gypsum, and ammonium nitrate in varied forms such as prill, flake, and melt.

== Revival of Production Units ==
In the year 2007, due to shortage of domestic production of Urea leading to higher imports and import costs from other countries, the Government of India decided to revive all the production units of FCIL and HCF to meet the overall domestic demand of Urea. The closed units had huge infrastructure facilities like sizable land bank, residential quarters, office buildings, railway siding, tied up sources of electricity and water which also led to the decision of revival. Cabinet Committee on Economic Affairs (CCEA) gave in principle approval to examine the feasibility of reviving units of FCIL and HFCL subject to confirmed availability of gas.

In October 2008, CCEA accorded approval to revive FCIL and HFCL units subject to non-recourse to government funding and to consider write-off of government loan & interest to the extent required subject to submission of fully tied up proposal for final decision on waiver.

In November 2008, Empowered Committee of Secretaries (ECOS) was constituted to evaluate all options of revival of closed units and to decide upon the action to be pursued for seeking investments towards revival of each of the unit & recommend to the Government for approval. The ECOS after detailed deliberations recommended that the revival of these closed units would be through ‘nomination route’ by Public Sector Undertakings (PSUs) and through ‘bidding route’ by private sector.

In August 2011, Government of India decided inter alia awarding individual units to selected parties on a concession basis based on the revival model recommended by ECOS. Talcher and Ramagundam unites were to be revived by PSUs through ‘nomination route' while Sindri, Gorakhpur and Korba Units through ‘bidding route’.

In May 2013, CCEA approved the proposal regarding revival of five closed units of FCIL which included approval of Rs.10,644 crore loan and interest wavier and inter corporate loan of Rs.171 crore.

In June 2013, the Company was deregistered from BIFR, after its net worth became positive in the financial year 2012-13.

Following companies have been registered during the revival of the closed fertiliser units of both FCIL and HFCL in which FCIL is a stakeholder in lieu of land and infrastructure usage:

1. Talcher Fertilisers Limited (TFL) - Joint venture promoted by GAIL (31.85%), CIL (31.85%), RCF (31.85%) and FCIL (4.45%) was formed to revive FCIL’s Talcher fertiliser unit in the Angul district of Odisha. The company plans to produce approximately 1.26 Million Metric Tonnes per Annum of urea using coal as feedstock. In January 2023, Mansukh Mandaviya, Minister of Chemicals and Fertilisers, said that the plant would be operational By October 2024.
2. Ramagundam Fertilisers and Chemicals Limited (RFCL) - Joint venture of NFL (26%), EIL (26%), GAIL (14.3%), HTAS Consortium (11.7%), Government of Telangana (11%) and FCIL (11%) was incorporated in February 2015 to set up natural gas-based ammonia urea complex in Ramagundam, Telangana. The unit began commercial operations in March 2021 while the inauguration ceremony was held in November 2022.
3. Hindustan Urvarak and Rasayan Limited (HURL) - Joint venture of CIL (29.67%), NTPC (29.67%), IOCL (29.67%), HFCL and FCIL (11%) was incorporated in June 2016 for setting up gas based Ammonia urea plant of 12.7 Lakh Metric Tonne Per Annum capacity each at Gorakhpur, Sindri and Barauni. Gorakhpur plant was commissioned in December 2021, Barauni plant started urea production in October 2022 while Sindri plant in November 2022.

The revival of setting up of the fertiliser unit at Durgapur, Haldia and Korba is yet to be decided by Government of India.
