= Hindustan Fertiliser Corporation =

Indian government-owned fertilizer company

Hindustan Fertiliser Corporation Limited
- Company type: Public Sector Undertaking
- Founded: 1978
- Headquarters: New Delhi, India
- Products: Fertilisers
- Owner: Ministry of Chemicals and Fertilizers, Government of India

Hindustan Fertiliser Corporation Limited is a government-owned fertiliser manufacturing company headquartered in New Delhi. It is under the ownership of the Ministry of Chemicals and Fertilizers, Government of India. It mainly manufactures urea which is promoted and distributed by the company under the Moti Urea brand name. It has three manufacturing plants. The Namrup-II unit was closed up by the company in 1994 due to scant supply of natural gas. The corporation was part of the Fertilizer Corporation of India. It was spun off into a separate entity after re-organization of Fertiliser Corporation of India in early 1978 as per Government Of India's decision. It has manufacturing units at Durgapur and Haldia.

Under the Sick Industrial Companies (Special Provisions) Act 1985, the Board for Industrial and Financial Reconstruction (BIFR) declared the Hindustan Fertiliser Corporation Limited sick in 1992. Within the next decade, the Indian government concluded that all of its fertiliser production units were incurring heavy losses, and decided to close the corporation in September 2002.

== Revival ==
Because of the shortage of domestic production of urea in meeting the overall domestic demand of urea, the cabinet decided in April 2007 to consider the feasibility of reviving the Fertiliser Corporation of India. In 2008, the government approved revival of all the closed units of the Hindustan Fertiliser Corporation.
