= Milind Kamble =

Indian entrepreneur

Dr. Milind Pralhad Kamble
- Born: February 17, 1967 (age 59); Chobli, Latur district, Maharashtra, India
- Citizenship: India
- Education: Diploma in Civil Engineering, Nanded Government Polytechnic (1987)
- Occupations: Civil engineer, Entrepreneur
- Known for: Founder of Dalit Indian Chamber of Commerce and Industry (DICCI); Chairperson of the Board of Governors, Indian Institute of Management Jammu
- Awards: Padma Shri (2013); Bhim Ratna Award (2010)

Milind Pralhad Kamble (born 17 February 1967) is an Indian civil engineer, entrepreneur and policy contributor best known for founding the Dalit Indian Chamber of Commerce and Industry (DICCI) in 2005. He serves as chairperson of the board of governors at the Indian Institute of Management Jammu, becoming the first person from a Scheduled Caste community to hold the position. Kamble has been associated with initiatives relating to entrepreneurship, affirmative action, and representation of Scheduled Caste and Scheduled Tribe entrepreneurs in national economic frameworks.

His contributions to trade and industry were recognised with the Padma Shri in 2013.

== Early life and education ==
Kamble was born on 17 February 1967 in Chobli, Latur district, Maharashtra. He completed his schooling in Maharashtra and earned a diploma in civil engineering from the Nanded Government Polytechnic in 1987. He subsequently worked in private construction firms for five years before establishing his own civil engineering business.

In 1992, he founded Milind Kamble Civil Engineers and Contractors, which executed civil projects including segments of the Konkan Railway, the Mumbai–Pune Expressway, the Baramati Water Supply Scheme and the Pune–Lavasa Road. The firm was later renamed Fortune Construction and expanded into an ISO-certified enterprise.

== Career ==
=== Public service and policy roles ===
In May 2019, Kamble was appointed chairperson of the board of governors of the Indian Institute of Management Jammu. He previously served as a board member at IIM Kashipur. During his tenure at IIM Jammu, the institute upgraded infrastructure and recorded student placement milestones, eventually achieving two international accreditations and securing a ranking in the National Institutional Ranking Framework (NIRF).

Kamble was a member of the National Curriculum Framework Steering Committee (2021) constituted by the Ministry of Education under the National Education Policy 2020.

He also co-chairs the Confederation of Indian Industry (CII) National Task Force on Affirmative Action, contributing to industry-led initiatives for SC/ST entrepreneurship, education and employment.

Since 2016, Kamble has chaired the advisory committee of the Ministry of MSME’s National SC/ST Hub. The scheme has supported over 145,000 SC/ST entrepreneurs and facilitated business execution valued at over ₹3,564 crore.

During India’s G20 Presidency (2023), Kamble served on the B20 India Steering Committee and the International Advocacy Caucus, contributing to discussions on inclusive growth and supplier diversity.

=== Entrepreneurial career ===
Kamble is Chairman of Superb MAA Housing & Infrastructure LLP and Superb MAA Developers LLP. The group has undertaken mass housing projects consisting of more than 6,800 residential units, with nearly 6 million sq. ft of built-up area and an additional 1 million sq. ft of commercial development, collectively valued at approximately USD 1.5 billion. Two large housing projects are under construction in Panvel, Mumbai. He also serves as an Independent Director at Belrise Industries Ltd.

=== DICCI and related initiatives ===
Kamble founded DICCI in 2005 to promote entrepreneurship among Scheduled Caste communities. Under his leadership, the organisation expanded to more than 1,000 members across sectors including manufacturing, services and offshore engineering. It currently has 29 state chapters and seven international chapters.

DICCI has implemented trade fairs, capacity-building programmes and a venture capital initiative. In 2012, SEBI approved the DICCI SME Fund, designed to provide equity support and managerial inputs to emerging Dalit entrepreneurs.

== Socio-economic initiatives ==
Kamble has advocated entrepreneurship as a means for social and economic mobility for historically marginalised communities. Through DICCI, he promoted frameworks encouraging SC/ST entrepreneurs to become employers and contributors to economic development.

He has collaborated with the CII–DICCI Model Career Centres, which aim to provide employability training and placement support to SC/ST youth.

== Awards and recognitions ==
Year	Award / Honour	Details
2010	Bhim Ratna Award	Awarded by the Government of Maharashtra
2011	Marathwada Udyog Bhushan Award; Maharashtra Times Nayak Award	Recognised for contributions in entrepreneurship
2013	Padma Shri (Trade & Industry)	Awarded by the President of India
2015	Samaj Bhushan	Awarded by the Government of Maharashtra

== Personal life ==
Kamble resides in Pune. In 2001, he created one of the earliest comprehensive websites on Dr. B. R. Ambedkar, containing archival materials including texts and photographs. He is married and has children. Kamble frequently speaks at educational institutions on entrepreneurship and economic participation.
