= Rajesh Saraiya =

Indian businessman

Rajesh Saraiya (born 1969) is an Indian industrialist and member of the Dalit Indian Chamber of Commerce and Industry (DICCI). He is considered as the first Dalit billionaire of India.

== Biography ==
Rajesh Saraiya was born in Saraiya Sani Village in Sitapur, Uttar Pradesh. He grew up in Dehradun and studied Aeronautical science from the Kyiv Institute of Civil Aviation in Ukraine.

Saraiya was awarded the Pravasi Bharatiya Award in 2012 and the Padma Shri in 2014.

Saraiya is the CEO of Steel Mont Trading Ltd., headquartered in Düsseldorf, Germany. It deals with steel trading, production, commodities and shipping. The company has offices in London, Kyiv, Istanbul, Dubai, Mumbai and Tianjin.
