= Lodna =

- Neighbourhood in Dhanbad
- Location within Jharkhand Location within India
- Coordinates: 23.72101°N 86.44338°E
- Country: India
- State: Jharkhand
- District: Dhanbad

Population (2001)
  - Total: 35,000
- Time zone: UTC+05:30 (IST)
- Pincode: 828131

Lodna is a neighbourhood in Dhanbad in Dhanbad Sadar subdivision of Dhanbad district in Jharkhand state, India.

== Geography ==
Cities, towns and locations in the southern portion of Dhanbad Sadar subdivision in Dhanbad district
MC: Municipal Corporation, CT: Census Town, N: Neighbourhood, R: Rural/ Urban centre
Owing to space constraints in the small map, the actual locations in a larger map may vary slightly

=== Location ===
Lodna is located at 23.72101°N 86.44338°E.

Note: The map alongside presents some of the notable locations in the area. All places marked in the map are linked in the larger full screen map.

The earlier census town was combined with other urban units to form Dhanbad Municipal Corporation in 2006.

Lodna is part of Ward No. 46 of Dhanbad Municipal Corporation.

It is located 1.4 km distance from tehsil headquarters Jharia and is 9.1 km far from its district headquarters, Dhanbad. Among other nearby towns and villages, Tisra is located at distance of 0.5 km., Jayrampur at 1.9 km., Jeenagora at distance of 2.1 km., Bagdigi at distance of 1.2 km., Jamadoba at distance of 1.5 km.

=== Overview ===
The region shown in the map is a part of the undulating uplands bustling with coalmines. The Damodar River, the most important river of the Chota Nagpur Plateau, flows along the southern border. A major part of the area shown in the map is part of Dhanbad Municipal Corporation, an urban area. The places in the DMC area are marked as neighbourhoods. The western part of the region shown in the map is covered by Dhanbad (community development block). 57% of the population of Dhanbad CD block reside in rural areas and 43% reside in urban areas, The east-central part of the region shown in the map is covered by Baliapur (community development block). 86% of the population of Baliapur CD block reside in rural areas and 14% reside in urban areas. The places in the CD block areas are marked mostly as census towns. Three operational areas of BCCL operate fully within the region – Pootkee Balihari Area, Lodna Area and Eastern Jharia Area. The Moonidih sector of Western Jharia Area also operates in the region.

== Economy ==
=== Coal ===
Lodna and surrounding areas have been an important coal mining center since more than hundred years and coal mines are now managed by Bharat Coking Coal Limited.

The Lodna Area of BCCL comprises 5 underground mines, 2 departmentally operated open cast mines and 1 outsourced OC mine. The underground mines are: Lodna, Bagdigi, Joyrampur, North Tisra and Bararee. The Jealgora underground mine has been closed down and dewatered from the surface. The open cast mines are: NT-ST, Jeenagora (departmental) and Jeenagora Patch I (outsourced). Lodna Area has mineable reserves of 46.368 million tonnes of coking coal and 618.6 million tonnes of non-coking coal.

=== Agriculture ===
It also consists of agricultural land which is well watered with the river that flows in the town the river is a tributary of Damodar River.

== Transport ==
There is a railway station at Lodna, which is mainly used for coal loading and transportation purpose. Now Lodna Station is not working due to underground fire.

Major source of transport is autorickshaw.

== Education ==
There are some schools in Lodna, like, Lodna High School, Coalfield English School, Navyug.

== Healthcare ==
Apart from Lodna Regional Hospital at Jealgora, BCCL has dispensaries in all units of Lodna Area and one at Sindri. Each dispensary is having medical officer, para medical staff and sweepers. An ambulance is readily available in the regional hospital.
