= Ravi Kumar Narra =

Indian businessman and social worker

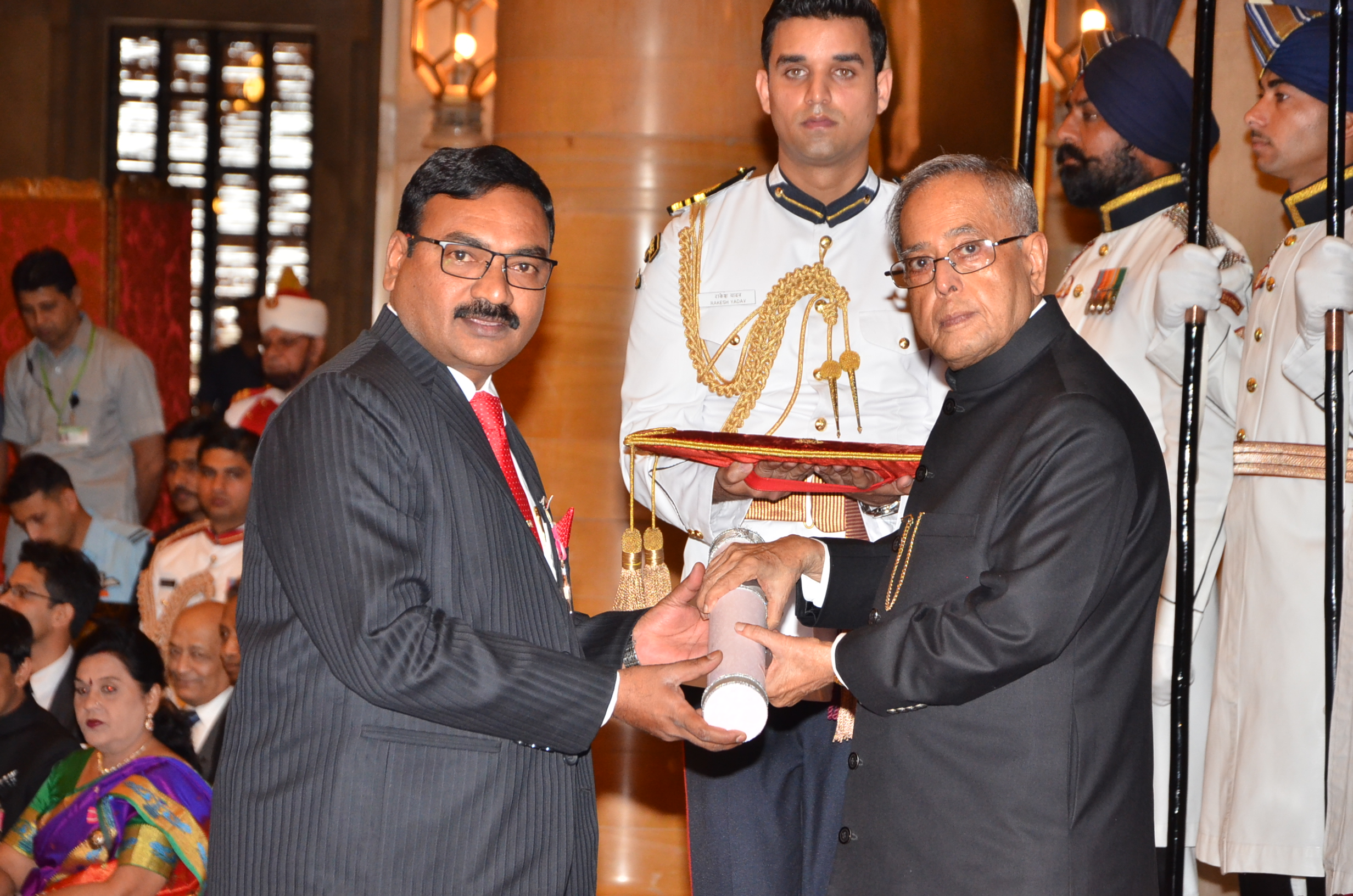
- Born: 1 September 1963 (age 63); Secunderabad, India
- Occupations: Businessman and social activist
- Spouse: N. Vanajakshi
- Children: 2
- Awards: Padma Shri
- Website: Official web site

Ravi Kumar Narra is an Indian businessman and social worker from Secunderabad, known for his efforts for the upliftment of the Dalit community. He was awarded Padma Shri, the fourth highest civilian award, for his services to society by the Government of India in 2014.

== Biography ==
The main hurdle faced by Dalit entrepreneurs is from the banking sector. Banks are not extending capital to new entrepreneurs without collateral security in spite of Centre's stipulation that up to ₹ One crore should be given by not insisting on it. Ravi Kumar Narra says about the attitude of the banks towards dalit entrepreneurs

Ravi Kumar Narra was born on 1 September 1963 to Shankaraiah Narra, who was a daily wage mason, in a family with meagre financial resources, in a slum in Secunderabad, commonly known as the twin city of Hyderabad, in the south Indian State of Telangana. He graduated with a bachelor's degree in science (B.Sc), and continued his education in law to earn a bachelor's degree (LLB) and master's degree (LLM). He also secured a diploma in journalism and a diploma in public relations.

== Dalit enterprise ==
Narra is the coordinator for the Dalit Indian Chamber of Commerce and Industry (DICCI) in South India, covering five states. He has also been President of DICCI, Andhra Pradesh Chapter since 2011. As a member of the National Governing Board of DICCI, he helped to modify the Government Industrial Policy 2010-2015 such that it aided Dalits.

He has been a member of the National Task Force (NTF) of the Government of India, for Affirmative Action and Supplier Diversity.

Narra organise IGNITE, a 21-day residential programme for 220 Dalit entrepreneurs including 40 women from all over Andhra Pradesh at the NIMSME, Hyderabad. It is an entrepreneurship development programme involving the Government, CII, banks, training institutions and similar.

== Shanti Chakra Foundation ==
Narra founded Shanti Chakra Foundation, a service organisation to develop networking amongst Dalits. It promotes the philosophy of B. R. Ambedkar and educates against superstitions. The Foundation undertakes weekly classes for Dalits - particularly youths - on a range of subjects.

== Awards and recognition ==
Ravi Kumar Narra was honoured by the Government of India with the Padma Shri in 2014, in recognition of his services to society.
