= Hindustan Organic Chemicals Limited =

Indian public center based in Mumbai

Hindustan Organic Chemicals Ltd
- Type: Public
- Traded as: BSE: 500449; NSE: HOCL
- Industry: Chemicals, organic chemicals
- Founded: 1960
- Headquarters: Mumbai, Maharashtra, India
- Key people: Sajeev B. (chairman & MD)
- Products: Phenol, acetone, hydrogen peroxide
- Owner: Government of India
- Number of employees: 197
- Website: Official website

Hindustan Organic Chemicals Limited (HOCL) is an Indian central public sector undertaking based in Mumbai. It was established in 1960 to indigenize the manufacture of basic chemicals and to reduce country’s dependence on import of vital organic chemicals.

Its products are phenol, acetone, nitrobenzene, aniline, nitrotoluenes, chlorobenzenes and nitro chlorobenzenes. Basic organic chemicals include pesticides, drugs & pharmaceuticals, dyes & dyestuffs, plastics, resins & laminates, rubber chemicals, paints, textile auxiliaries and explosives.

The company is under the ownership of the Government of India and the administrative control of Ministry of Chemicals and Fertilizers.

Hindustan Organic Chemicals has two units in Rasayani and in Kochi.
