= Hindustan Insecticides =

Indian chemical company

Hindustan Insecticides Limited
- Type: Central Public Sector Undertaking
- Industry: Chemicals
- Founded: 1954
- Headquarters: New Delhi, India
- Products: DDT
- Owner: Ministry of Chemicals and Fertilizers, Government of India

Hindustan Insecticides Limited (HIL) is an Indian central public sector undertaking under the ownership of Ministry of Chemicals and Fertilizers, Government of India. It was incorporated in March 1954 in order to start production of DDT for the National Malaria Eradication Programme. Since then its product range has expanded to include Insecticides, Herbicides, Weedecides, and Fungicides.

HIL is the world's largest producer of DDT. The company has three manufacturing units, located at Udyogamandal near Kochi (Southern India), Rasayani near Mumbai (Western India) and Bathinda in Punjab (Northern India). It provides employment to nearly 1300 people.

HIL plans to continue expanding its seed and fertilizers operations.
