= Projects and Development India =

Indian central public sector undertaking

Projects and Development India Limited
- Type: Central Public Sector Undertaking
- Industry: Chemicals, fertilizer, oil and gas, pipelines and refinery
- Founded: 1978
- Headquarters: Noida, India
- Key people: Partha Sarthi Sen Sharma, Chairman and MD
- Owner: Ministry of Chemicals and Fertilizers, Government of India
- Website: pdilin.com

Projects and Development India Limited (PDIL) is an Indian central public sector undertaking under the ownership of the Ministry of Chemicals and Fertilizers, Government of India.

== History ==
Projects and Development India Limited (PDIL) originated in 1951 as the technology wing of the Fertilizer Corporation of India (FCI), established to support technological self-reliance in the fertilizer sector and was renamed PDIL in 1981 with a head office in Sindri, Jharkhand. It is a project management and engineering consultancy providing services from concept to commissioning for fertilizer and allied chemical, oil and gas industries.
