= Ministry of Chemicals and Fertilizers =

Government ministry of India

- Branch of Government of India

- Ministry of Chemicals and Fertilizers

Agency overview
- Formed: 25 December 1975; 50 years ago
- Jurisdiction: Government of India
- Annual budget: ₹178,482 crore (US$19 billion) (2023-24 est.)
- Agency executives: Jagat Prakash Nadda, Cabinet Minister; Anupriya Patel, Minister of State; Manoj Joshi, Secretary, Dept. of Pharmaceuticals; Tejveer Singh, Secretary, Dept. of Chemical and Petrochemicals; Rajat Kumar Mishra, Secretary, Dept, of Fertilisers
- Website: chemicals.gov.in; fert.gov.in/en; pharma-dept.gov.in

The Ministry of Chemicals and Fertilizers in India is the federal ministry with administrative purview over three departments namely:

- Department of Chemicals and Petrochemicals
- Department of Fertilizers
- Department of Pharmaceuticals

The ministry is headed by the Minister of Chemicals and fertilizers. Jagat Prakash Nadda is the current minister.

== Department of Chemicals and Petrochemicals ==
The Department of Chemicals and Petrochemicals was under the Ministry of Industry until December 1989, when it was brought under the Ministry of Petroleum and Chemicals. On June 5, 1991, the Department of Chemicals and Petrochemicals was transferred to the Ministry of Chemicals and Fertilisers.

The department is entrusted with the responsibility of planning, development and regulations of the chemicals, petrochemicals and pharmaceutical industry sector, inducting:

- Drugs and pharmaceuticals, excluding those specifically allotted to other departments
- Insecticides, excluding the administration of the Insecticides Act, 1968 (46 of 1968).
- Molasses
- Alcohol – Industrial and Potable from the molasses route.
- Dyestuffs and dye intermediates
- All organic and inorganic chemicals not specifically allotted to any other ministry or department.
- Bhopal disaster – special laws
- Petrochemicals
- Industries relating to production of non-cellulosic synthetic fibres such as nylon, polyester, and acrylic
- Synthetic rubber
- Plastics including fabrications of plastic and moulded goods
- Planning, development and control of, and assistance to, all industries dealt with by the Department

The department has various divisions under it. The important being:

- Chemical Division
- Petrochemicals Division
- Monitoring and Evaluation Division (M&E Division)

== Department of Pharmaceuticals ==
=== Pradhan Mantri Bharatiya Janaushadhi Pariyojana ===
Pradhan Mantri Bharatiya Janaushadhi Pariyojana (PMBJP) is a campaign launched by the Department of Pharmaceuticals, Government of India, to provide quality medicines at affordable prices to the masses through special kendras known as Pradhan Mantri Bharatiya Janaushadhi Pariyojana Kendra. Pradhan Mantri Bharatiya Janaushadhi Pariyojana Kendra (PMBJPK) have been set up to provide generic drugs, which are available at lesser prices but are equivalent in quality and efficacy as expensive branded drugs. BPPI (Bureau of Pharma Public Sector Undertakings of India) has been established under the Department of Pharmaceuticals, Govt. of India, with the support of all the CPSUs for co-ordinating procurement, supply and marketing of generic drugs through Pradhan Mantri Bharatiya Janaushadhi Pariyojana Kendra.

== Attached offices ==
- National Pharmaceutical Pricing Authority (NPPA)
- Pharmaceuticals and Medical Devices Bureau of India (PMBI)

== Autonomous bodies ==
- National Institute of Pharmaceutical Education and Research located at seven places.
- Central Institute of Plastics Engineering and Technology (CIPET)

Central Institute of Plastics Engineering & Technology (CIPET) is a premier National Institution devoted to Academic, Technology Support & Research (ATR) for the Plastics & allied industries, in India. First CIPET campus was established by Government of India in 1968 at Chennai and subsequently 14 CIPET Campuses have been established by Government of India in the country.

Today CIPET has many campuses.

- Central Institute of Plastics Engineering & Technology, Ahmedabad
- Central Institute of Plastics Engineering & Technology, Amritsar
- Central Institute of Plastics Engineering & Technology, Aurangabad
- Central Institute of Plastics Engineering & Technology, Bhopal
- Central Institute of Plastics Engineering & Technology, Bhubaneswar
- Central Institute of Plastics Engineering & Technology, Chennai
- Central Institute of Plastics Engineering & Technology, Guwahati
- Central Institute of Plastics Engineering & Technology, Hyderabad
- Central Institute of Plastics Engineering & Technology, Hajipur
- Central Institute of Plastics Engineering & Technology, Haldia
- Central Institute of Plastics Engineering & Technology, Jaipur
- Central Institute of Plastics Engineering & Technology, Imphal
- Central Institute of Plastics Engineering & Technology, Lucknow
- Central Institute of Plastics Engineering & Technology, Mysore
- Central Institute of Plastics Engineering & Technology, Khunti
- Central Institute of Plastics Engineering & Technology, Panipat
- Central Institute of Plastics Engineering & Technology, Madurai
- Central Institute of Plastics Engineering & Technology, Raipur
- Central Institute of Petrochemicals Engineering & Technology, Chandrapur

These are contributing through ATR services to the industries in India and Abroad, having uniform infrastructural facilities in the areas of Design, CAD/CAM/CAE, Tooling & Mould Manufacturing, Plastics processing, Testing and Quality control.

CIPET chennai also started a department called ARSTPS (Advance Research School for Technology and Product Simulation) which provides facilities in areas of Design, CAD/CAM/CAE. It also provide a ME degree program for CAD/CAM.A

== Central public sector undertakings ==
- Bengal Chemicals and Pharmaceuticals Limited (BCPL)
- Bramhaputra Valley Fertilizer Corporation Limited (BVFCL)
- FCI Aravali Gypsum and Minerals India Limited (FAGMIL)
- Fertilizers and Chemicals Travancore Limited (FACT)
- Fertilizer Association of India (FAI)
- Fertilizer Corporation of India (FCIL)
- Hindustan Antibiotics Limited (HAL)
- Hindustan Insecticides Limited (HIL)
- Hindustan Organic Chemicals Limited (HOCL)
- Madras Fertilizers Limited (MFL)
- National Fertilizers Limited (NFL)
- Projects and Development India Limited (PDIL)
- Rashtriya Chemicals and Fertilizers Limited (RCF)
- Ramagundam Fertilizers and Chemicals Ltd., a Joint Venture of NFL, Engineers India Ltd. and FCIL
- Bramhaputra Cracker and Polymer Limited (BCPL)
- Karnataka Antibiotics & Pharmaceuticals Ltd

== Cabinet Ministers ==
No.	Portrait	Minister (Birth-Death) Constituency	Term of office			Political party	Ministry	Prime Minister
No.	Portrait	Minister (Birth-Death) Constituency	From	To	Period	Political party	Ministry	Prime Minister
Minister of Chemicals and Fertilizers
1		Prakash Chandra Sethi (1919–1996); Rajya Sabha MP for Madhya Pradesh	25 December 1975	23 December 1976	364 days	Indian National Congress (R)	Indira III	Indira Gandhi
2		Keshav Dev Malviya (1904–1981); MP for Domariyaganj	23 December 1976	24 March 1977	91 days	Indian National Congress (R)	Indira III	Indira Gandhi
3		Hemwati Nandan Bahuguna (1919–1989); MP for Lucknow	28 March 1977	29 March 1977	1 day	Janata Party	Desai	Morarji Desai
Minister of Petroleum, Chemicals and Fertilizers
(3)		Hemwati Nandan Bahuguna (1919–1989); MP for Lucknow	29 March 1977	15 July 1977	108 days	Janata Party	Desai	Morarji Desai
–		Morarji Desai (1896–1995); MP for Surat (Prime Minister)	16 July 1979	28 July 1979	12 days	Janata Party	Desai	Morarji Desai
4		T. A. Pai (1922–1981); MP for Udipi	28 July 1979	19 August 1979	22 days	Indian National Congress (U)	Charan	Charan Singh
5		Aravinda Bala Pajanor (1935–2013); MP for Pondicherry	19 August 1979	26 December 1979	129 days	All India Anna Dravida Munnetra Kazhagam	Charan	Charan Singh
6		Shyam Nath Kacker (born unknown); Unelected	26 December 1979	14 January 1980	19 days	Janata Party (Secular)	Charan	Charan Singh
Minister of Petroleum and Chemicals
(1)		Prakash Chandra Sethi (1919–1996); MP for Indore	16 January 1980	7 March 1980	51 days	Indian National Congress (R)	Indira IV	Indira Gandhi
7		Veerendra Patil (1924–1997); MP for Bagalkot	7 March 1980	19 October 1980	226 days	Indian National Congress (R)	Indira IV	Indira Gandhi
Minister of Petroleum, Chemicals and Fertilizers
(1)		Prakash Chandra Sethi (1919–1996); MP for Indore	19 October 1980	15 January 1982	1 year, 88 days	Indian National Congress (R)	Indira IV	Indira Gandhi
8		P. Shiv Shankar (1929–2017); MP for Secunderabad	15 January 1982	2 September 1982	230 days	Indian National Congress (R)	Indira IV	Indira Gandhi
Minister of Chemicals and Fertilizers
9		Vasant Sathe (1925–2011); MP for Wardha	2 September 1982	31 October 1984	2 years, 120 days	Indian National Congress (R)	Indira IV	Indira Gandhi
9		Vasant Sathe (1925–2011); MP for Wardha	31 October 1984	31 December 1984	2 years, 120 days	Indian National Congress (R)	Rajiv I	Rajiv Gandhi
(7)		Veerendra Patil (1924–1997); MP for Bagalkot	31 December 1984	25 September 1985	268 days	Indian National Congress (R)	Rajiv II	Rajiv Gandhi
Ministry disestablished during this interval. (Note: The Ministry of Chemicals and Fertilizers was bifurcated into the Department of Fertilizers under the Ministry of Agriculture and the Department of Chemicals and Petrochemicals under the Ministry of Industry.)
Minister of Petroleum and Chemicals
10		M. S. Gurupadaswamy (1924–2011); Rajya Sabha MP for Uttar Pradesh	6 December 1989	10 November 1990	339 days	Janata Dal	Vishwanath	Vishwanath Pratap Singh
11		Satya Prakash Malaviya (1934–2018); Rajya Sabha MP for Uttar Pradesh	21 November 1990	21 June 1991	223 days	Samajwadi Janata Party (Rashtriya)	Chandra Shekhar	Chandra Shekhar
Minister of Chemicals and Fertilizers
–		P. V. Narasimha Rao (1921–2004); MP for Nandyal (Prime Minister)	21 June 1991	17 February 1994	2 years, 241 days	Indian National Congress (I)	Rao	P. V. Narasimha Rao
12		Ram Lakhan Singh Yadav (1920–2006); MP for Arrah	17 February 1994	16 May 1996	2 years, 89 days	Indian National Congress (I)	Rao	P. V. Narasimha Rao
–		Atal Bihari Vajpayee (1924–2018); MP for Lucknow (Prime Minister)	16 May 1996	1 June 1996	16 days	Bharatiya Janata Party	Vajpayee I	Atal Bihari Vajpayee
–		H. D. Deve Gowda (born 1933); Unelected (Prime Minister)	1 June 1996	29 June 1996	28 days	Janata Dal	Deve Gowda	H. D. Deve Gowda
13		Sis Ram Ola (1927–2013); MP for Jhunjhunu (MoS, I/C)	29 June 1996	21 April 1997	345 days	All India Indira Congress (Tiwari)	Deve Gowda	H. D. Deve Gowda
13		Sis Ram Ola (1927–2013); MP for Jhunjhunu (MoS, I/C)	21 April 1997	9 June 1997	345 days	All India Indira Congress (Tiwari)	Gujral	Inder Kumar Gujral
14		M. Arunachalam (1944–2004); MP for Tenkasi	9 June 1997	19 March 1998	283 days	Tamil Maanila Congress (Moopanar)	Gujral	Inder Kumar Gujral
15		Surjit Singh Barnala (1925–2017); MP for Sangrur	19 March 1998	13 October 1999	1 year, 208 days	Shiromani Akali Dal	Vajpayee II	Atal Bihari Vajpayee
16		Suresh Prabhu (born 1953); MP for Rajapur	13 October 1999	30 September 2000	353 days	Shiv Sena	Vajpayee III	Atal Bihari Vajpayee
17		Sundar Lal Patwa (1924–2016); MP for Narmadapuram	30 September 2000	7 November 2000	38 days	Bharatiya Janata Party	Vajpayee III	Atal Bihari Vajpayee
18		Sukhdev Singh Dhindsa (1936–2025); Rajya Sabha MP for Punjab	7 November 2000	22 May 2004	3 years, 197 days	Shiromani Akali Dal	Vajpayee III	Atal Bihari Vajpayee
19		Ram Vilas Paswan (1946–2020); MP for Hajipur	23 May 2004	22 May 2009	4 years, 364 days	Lok Janshakti Party	Manmohan I	Manmohan Singh
20		M. K. Alagiri (born 1951); MP for Madurai	28 May 2009	20 March 2013	3 years, 296 days	Dravida Munnetra Kazhagam	Manmohan II	Manmohan Singh
21		Srikant Kumar Jena (born 1950); MP for Balasore (MoS, I/C)	20 March 2013	26 May 2014	1 year, 67 days	Indian National Congress	Manmohan II	Manmohan Singh
22		Ananth Kumar (1959–2018); MP for Bangalore South	27 May 2014	12 November 2018 (died in office)	4 years, 169 days	Bharatiya Janata Party	Modi I	Narendra Modi
23		D. V. Sadananda Gowda (born 1953); MP for Bangalore North	13 November 2018	30 May 2019	2 years, 236 days	Bharatiya Janata Party	Modi I	Narendra Modi
23		D. V. Sadananda Gowda (born 1953); MP for Bangalore North	31 May 2019	7 July 2021	2 years, 236 days	Bharatiya Janata Party	Modi II	Narendra Modi
24		Mansukh Mandaviya (born 1972); Rajya Sabha MP for Gujarat	7 July 2021	9 June 2024	2 years, 338 days	Bharatiya Janata Party	Modi II	Narendra Modi
25		Jagat Prakash Nadda (born 1960); Rajya Sabha MP for Gujarat	10 June 2024	Incumbent	2 years, 139 days	Bharatiya Janata Party	Modi III	Narendra Modi

== Ministers of State ==
No.	Portrait	Minister (Birth-Death) Constituency	Term of office			Political party	Ministry	Prime Minister
No.	Portrait	Minister (Birth-Death) Constituency	From	To	Period	Political party	Ministry	Prime Minister
Minister of State for Chemicals and Fertilizers
1		Ramchandra Rath (born 1945); MP for Aska	11 September 1982	31 October 1984	2 years, 50 days	Indian National Congress (I)	Indira IV	Indira Gandhi
Minister of State for Chemicals and Fertilizers
2		Chinta Mohan (born 1954); MP for Tirupati	26 June 1991	17 January 1993	1 year, 205 days	Indian National Congress (I)	Rao	P. V. Narasimha Rao
3		Eduardo Faleiro (born 1940); MP for Mormugao	18 January 1993	16 May 1996	3 years, 119 days	Indian National Congress (I)	Rao	P. V. Narasimha Rao
4		A. K. Patel (born 1931); MP for Mehsana	19 March 1998	13 October 1999	1 year, 208 days	Bharatiya Janata Party	Vajpayee II	Atal Bihari Vajpayee
5		Ramesh Bais (born 1947); MP for Raipur	13 October 1999	30 September 2000	353 days	Bharatiya Janata Party	Vajpayee III	Atal Bihari Vajpayee
6		Satyabrata Mookherjee (1932–2023); MP for Krishnanagar	30 September 2000	1 July 2002	1 year, 274 days	Bharatiya Janata Party	Vajpayee III	Atal Bihari Vajpayee
7		Tapan Sikdar (1944–2014); MP for Dum Dum	1 July 2002	29 January 2003	212 days	Bharatiya Janata Party	Vajpayee III	Atal Bihari Vajpayee
8		Chhatrapal Singh Lodha (born 1946); MP for Bulandshahr	29 January 2003	16 March 2004	1 year, 47 days	Bharatiya Janata Party	Vajpayee III	Atal Bihari Vajpayee
9		K. Rahman Khan (born 1939); Rajya Sabha MP for Karnataka	23 May 2004	20 July 2004	58 days	Indian National Congress	Manmohan I	Manmohan Singh
10		Bijoy Krishna Handique (1934–2015); MP for Jorhat	29 January 2006	22 May 2009	3 years, 113 days	Indian National Congress	Manmohan I	Manmohan Singh
11		Srikant Kumar Jena (born 1950); MP for Balasore	28 May 2009	20 March 2013	3 years, 296 days	Indian National Congress	Manmohan II	Manmohan Singh
12		Nihalchand (born 1971); MP for Ganganagar	27 May 2014	9 November 2014	166 days	Bharatiya Janata Party	Modi I	Narendra Modi
13		Hansraj Gangaram Ahir (born 1954); MP for Chandrapur	9 November 2014	5 July 2016	1 year, 239 days	Bharatiya Janata Party	Modi I	Narendra Modi
14		Mansukh Mandaviya (born 1972); Rajya Sabha MP for Gujarat	5 July 2016	30 May 2019	2 years, 329 days	Bharatiya Janata Party	Modi I	Narendra Modi
15		Rao Inderjit Singh (born 1951); MP for Gurgaon	3 September 2017	30 May 2019	1 year, 269 days	Bharatiya Janata Party	Modi I	Narendra Modi
16		Mansukh Mandaviya (born 1972); Rajya Sabha MP for Gujarat	31 May 2019	7 July 2021	2 years, 37 days	Bharatiya Janata Party	Modi II	Narendra Modi
17		Bhagwanth Khuba (born 1967); MP for Bidar	7 July 2021	9 June 2024	2 years, 338 days	Bharatiya Janata Party	Modi II	Narendra Modi
18		Anupriya Patel (born 1981); MP for Mirzapur	10 June 2024	Incumbent	2 years, 139 days	Apna Dal (Sonelal)	Modi III	Narendra Modi
