= Indian Institute of Management Jammu =

Business school

- Motto: It is knowledge that liberates
- Type: Public Business School
- Established: 2016; 10 years ago
- Chairperson: Milind Pralhad Kamble
- Director: B. S. Sahay
- Faculty: 21
- Students: 159
- Postgraduates: 159
- Location: Jammu, Jammu and Kashmir, India; 32.820246°N 74.897986°E
- Campus: Urban
- Website: www.iimj.ac.in

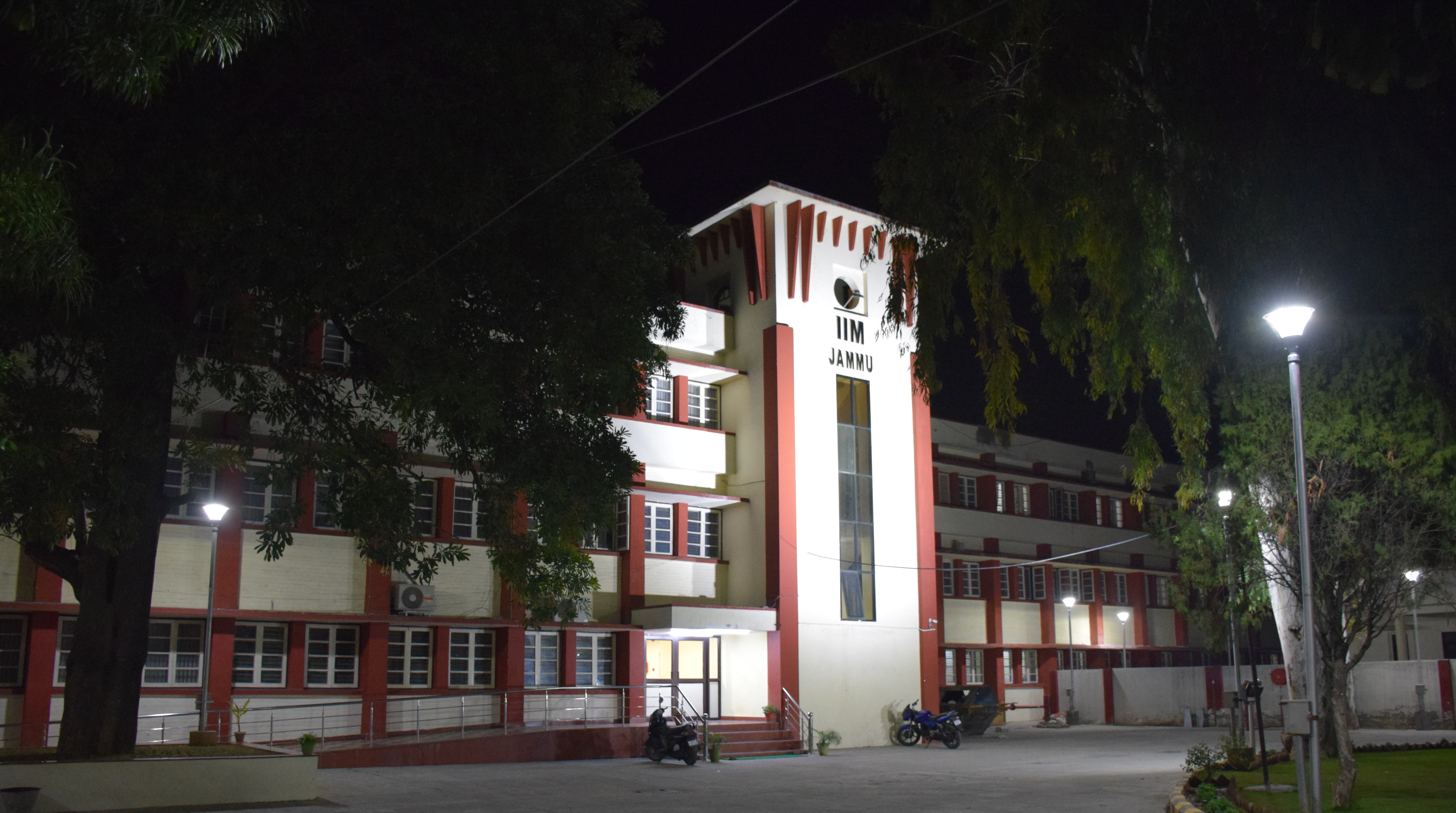
IIM Jammu

The Indian Institute of Management Jammu (IIM- Jammu or IIM-J) is a public, autonomous business school located in Jammu, Jammu and Kashmir, India. Established in 2016, it is the youngest Indian Institute of Management. IIM Jammu is currently (DBA) in Management as per Indian Institutes of Management Act 2017. The student intake is 240 for the Masters of Business Administration (MBA) programme for the year 2019.

== Background ==
IIM Jammu is established by the Ministry of Human Resource Development. It was established with the approval of the Union Cabinet, chaired by the Prime Minister Narendra Modi on 13 October 2016.

== Board of Governors ==
The Board of Governors (BoG) govern the administration and working of IIM Jammu. The chairperson of BoG is Mr. Milind Prahlad Kamble, Padma Shree awardee, Chairman and Managing Director of MPK Group of Companies and Founder of Dalit Indian Chamber of Commerce & Industry (DICCI). IIM Jammu is governed by a Board of Governors composed of eleven educationists and administrators namely:

- Mr. Sanjay Kumar Sinha (Joint Secretary Management, Ministry of Human Resource Development, Government of India),
- Ms. Anita Bhogle (Prosearch Consultants, Mumbai),
- Mr. Talat Parvez Rohella (Commissioner Secretary, Higher Education Department, Government of Jammu & Kashmir),
- Mr. Anand Kripalu (Managing Director, Chief Executive Officer and Member Diageo Global Executive Committee, Mumbai),
- Mr. Mukund Walvekar (Ex. Managing Director & Chief Executive Officer, Acer Ltd., Bengaluru),
- Mr. Ranjit Singh (Executive Managing Director, Kalpataru Power Transmission Ltd., Noida),
- Dr. Shalini Lal (Founder Infinity OD, New Delhi),
- Mr. Lalit Kumar Shantaram Naik (Director, Noveltech Feeds Private Ltd., Mumbai),
- Mr. Vijay Gambhire (Managing Director & Chief Executive Officer, CEAT Specialty Tyres Ltd.) and
- Prof. B. S. Sahay (Director, IIM Jammu)

== Campus ==
IIM Jammu constructed its permanent campus in 200 acres of land in Jagti situated 18 kilometres away from Jammu Airport. The permanent campus will offer technologically advanced classrooms, hostels, faculty residence and state of the art infrastructure. Further, IIM Jammu is setting up an Off-Campus Centre at Srinagar.

== Academics ==
IIM Jammu is currently offering Masters in Business Administration (MBA), Doctor of Business Administration (DBA) in Management, Executive Education programme and Faculty Development Programme. The MBA programme spans over six trimesters spread over the two years. The fundamental courses that lay the premises for various management roles are covered in the first year. Between the first and second year, students undertake an eight-week summer internship. In the second year, students pursue elective courses from Marketing, Business Policy and Strategy, Finance, Operations Management, Human Resource Management and Organization Behaviour area. The student intake for 2019–2020 year is 140 which will progressively go up to a cumulative student strength of 200 in the 4th year. In 2021, IIM Jammu inaugurated its first IPM batch for students after class 12th.

== Campus life ==
There are many student-run clubs and committee at IIM Jammu. The student-run clubs and committees are governed by Student Affairs Council. The student-run clubs and committee organizes events throughout the year.
