= Mannem Madhusudana Rao =

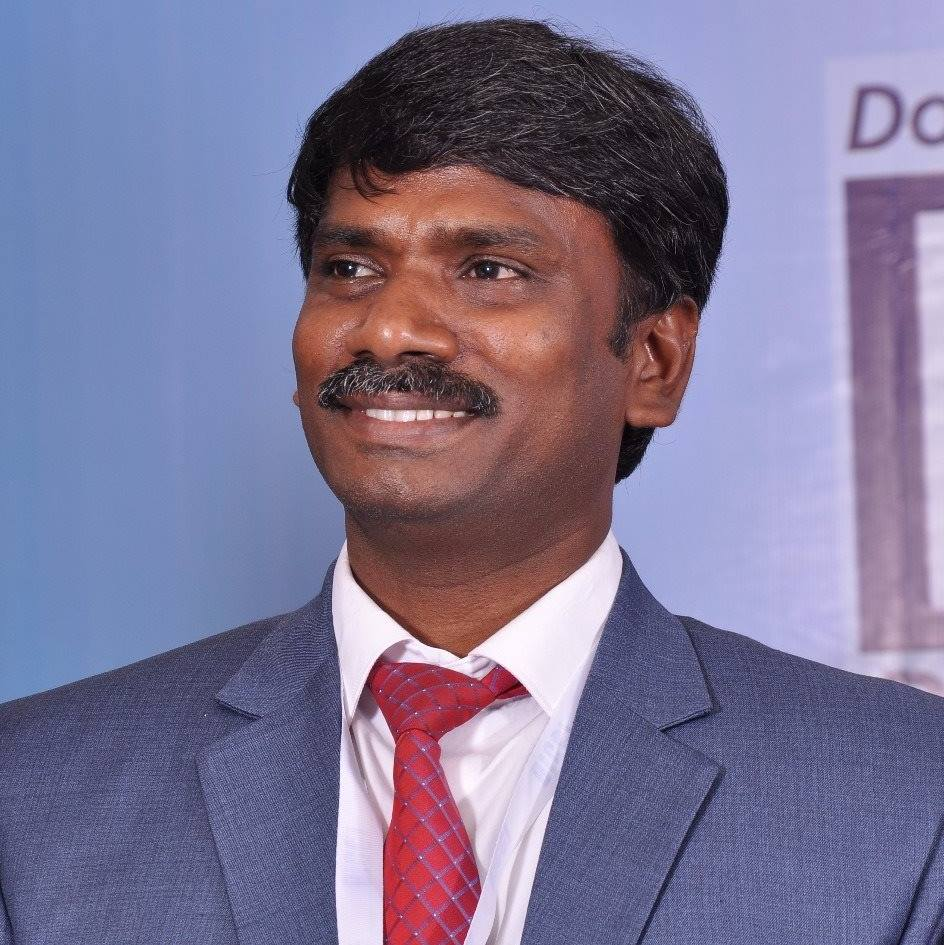
- MMR in 2017
- Born: Mannem Madhusudana Rao; Palukuru, Kandukuru, Prakasam, Andhra Pradesh, India
- Other names: MMR
- Occupation: Managing Director at MMR Group of Companies

Mannem Madhusudana Rao, well known as MMR is an Industrialist and managing director of MMR Group of Companies.
