= Central Institute of Petrochemicals Engineering & Technology =

Engineering institute in Haryana, India

- Other names: Central Institute of Plastics Engineering and Technology, Murthal
- Motto: Probe Perform Practice Plastics
- Type: Public
- Established: 2006
- Affiliations: All India Council for Technical Education
- Dean: P B Patro
- Director: Dr. S N Yadav
- Location: Murthal Sonipat, India; 29°2′N 77°5′E
- Campus: Urban
- Website: www.cipet.gov.in

Central Institute of Plastic Engineering and Technology, Murthal, formerly Central Institute of Plastics Engineering & Technology, is a public engineering institution located in Murthal in Sonipat district of Haryana in India. Established in 2017, inaugurated by Chief Minister Manohar Lal Khattar It spread over 10 acre land in the campus of Deenbandhu Chhotu Ram University of Science and Technology Murthal.
