= Indian Institute of Management Raipur =

Business school in Raipur, India

- Other name: IIM Raipur
- Type: Public business school
- Established: October 11, 2010; 15 years ago
- Chairperson: Puneeth Dalmia
- Director: Dr. Sanjeev Prashar (I/C)
- Academic staff: 100+
- Postgraduates: PGP: 210 ePGP: 200
- Location: Raipur, Chhattisgarh, India; 21.1211°N 81.8246°E
- Campus: Urban
- Website: http://www.iimraipur.ac.in/

The Indian Institute of Management Raipur (IIM Raipur, IIM-RR) is a business school and an institution of national importance located in Raipur, Chhattisgarh, India. It is the tenth Indian Institute of Management (IIM) established by the Government of India. It was inaugurated by Raman Singh, Chief Minister of Chhattisgarh on 11 October 2010.

== Campus ==
The IIM Raipur campus is situated across 203 acres in Atal Nagar, Naya Raipur, the new capital city of the state.

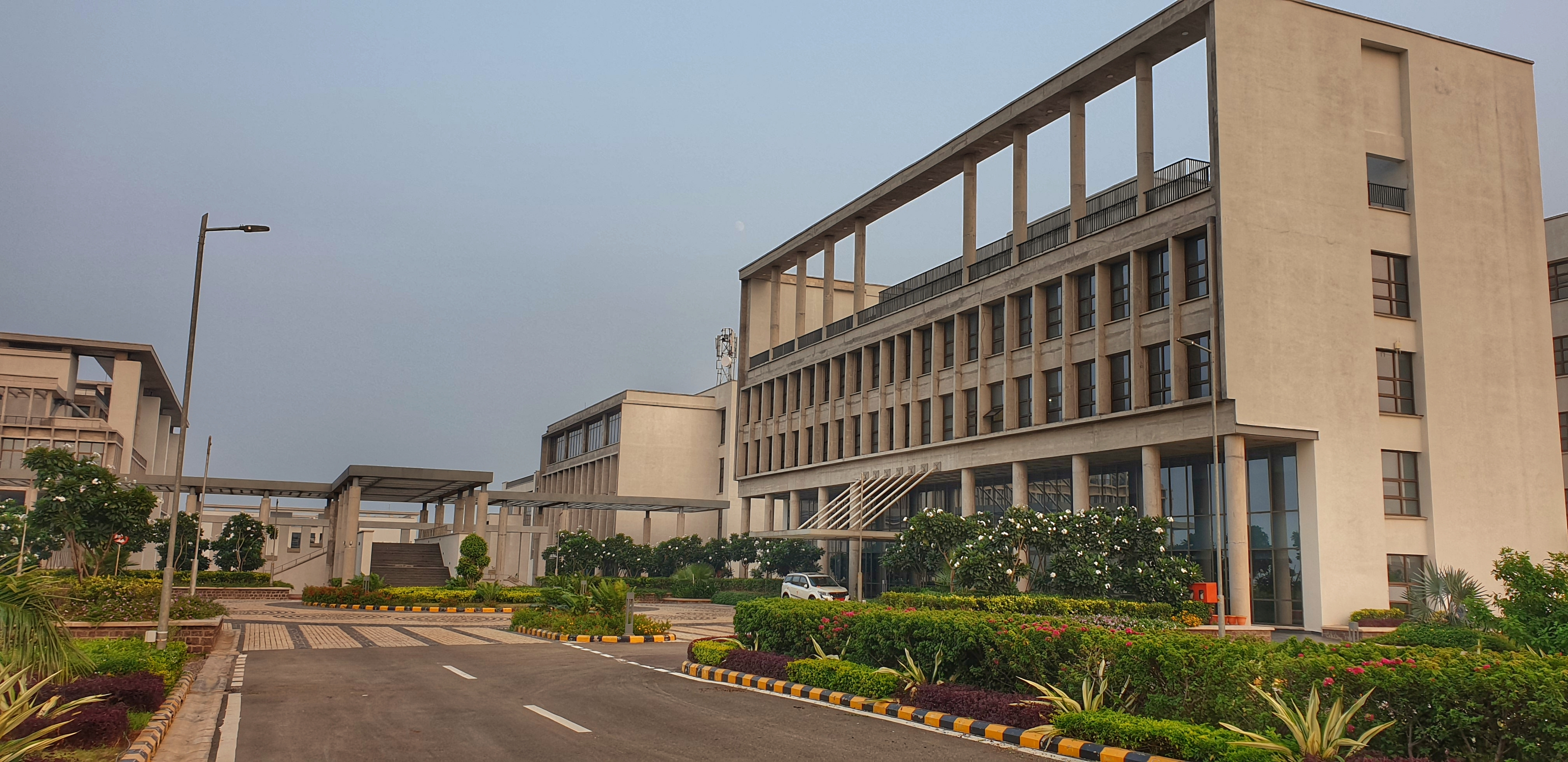
Admin Block

IIM Raipur subscribes to online resources such as ABI/ Inform Complete, Capitaline, EBSCO Business Source Complete, Prowess, Sciencedirect, Indiastat etc. The institute is a member of the Developing Library Network (DELNET) and the Indian National Digital Library in Engineering Sciences & Technology (INDEST).

The campus also has a sports complex with swimming pool, squash court, GYM, shuttle badminton court, table tennis rooms and more sports facilities. The institute also has outdoor sports facilities like Lawn tennis court, basketball court and a volleyball court just outside the sports complex.

The hostel in the campus are single occupancies with attached bathroom with high end amenities. Also the maintenance of each individual hostel rooms have been outsourced to a contractor whose employees are available in the campus till 4PM along with carpenters and plumbers, scheduled doctor visits.

== Academics ==
Similar to the other IIMs, IIM Raipur currently offers the MBA degree. It offers the following full-time and part-time academic programmes.

=== Post Graduate Program in Management (PGP) / MBA ===
The Post-Graduate Programme in Management extends over a period of two years, involving six trimesters with a summer internship at an organization. The first year is dedicated to the foundations for the functional areas of management, such as Marketing, Finance, Operations, Human Resource etc. In the second year the student choose a major and a minor specialization for elective courses.

=== Executive Post Graduate Program in Management (ePGP) / MBA ===
The Executive Post-Graduate Programme in Management spread over a period of two years, involving six terms and a mini-term which includes Mini Dissertation and Integrated simulation project. The course will be conducted in blended mode that includes live online classes and mandatory in campus modules. The first year is dedicated to advanced core courses in the functional areas of management. The second year include courses from all major functional areas to meet specific career goals of the students depending upon their career/academic interests.

=== Fellow Programme in Management (FPM) ===
IIM Raipur has started the Fellow Programme in Management (FPM) from academic year 2012–13. FPM is a full-time Doctoral programme that offers research scholars opportunities for advanced studies and research in different area of 'management'.

=== Post Graduate Programme in Management for Working Executive (PGPMWE) ===
The Post Graduate Programme in Management for Working Executive (PGPMWE) is an intensive one and a half-year post graduate program in management, especially designed for mid/senior level professionals. The classes are held on weekends only with the duration of 12 hours a week.

=== Executive Fellow Programme in Management (EFPM) ===
Executive Fellow Program in Management (EFPM) is a doctoral programme in management specifically designed for working professionals with more than 10 years of work experience in industry.

=== Executive Education Program (EEP) ===
The Executive Education Programmes of IIM, Raipur consist of:

==== Advanced Management Programmes ====
Advanced Management Programmes.

==== Management Development Programs ====
Management Development Programs (Open Programmes) are tied on faculty research, expertise knowledge diagonally to various disciplines of management and draw partakers from different organizations. These Programs are offered for Senior and Middle Level Managers of different Functional and interdisciplinary areas.

==== Customized (In-Company) Programmes ====
Customized (In-Company) Programmes are offered by the Institute and are designed, customized to meet the specific, precise needs of organizations

=== Teaching ===
The teaching at IIM Raipur presents a mix of lectures, case studies, business games, simulation exercises, role plays, group discussions, field visits, and industry based projects. The students receive guest lectures from personalities of the corporate world, e.g. Governor of the Reserve Bank of India, Duvvuri Subbarao.

=== Admission ===
Admission to the postgraduate course of IIM Raipur is through the Common Admission Test conducted in November each year. In an effort to diversify the gender of students, a bonus 30 marks to the overall score are granted to each female candidate who is not an engineer.

=== Rankings ===
Institute rankings

Business/Management – India
- NIRF (2022): 14

IIM Raipur was ranked 2nd in CSR-GHRDC Rankings 2020. Ranked 9 by Outlook- ICARE India MBA Rankings 2020. It was ranked 9th in India by Outlook Magazine in 2020. Ranked 14 by the National Institutional Ranking Framework (NIRF) management ranking in 2022.

== Research ==
A research subject IIM Raipur plans to focus on is Chhattisgarh's natural resources and energy management. To this end the institute plans to hire a dozen or so researchers.

== Student life ==
=== Equinox ===
Equinox is the Annual National Level Business and Cultural Fest of IIM Raipur. The inaugural edition of Equinox was held on 12 March 2011. The 3rd Edition of Equinox was held from 17 to 19 February 2013 and in 2019 it was renamed "Karmaanta" which means Business in Sanskrit.

IIM Raipur concluded with its sixth installment of Equinox (Equinox 6.0) on 2 February 2016 amid growing fanfare. The flagship events of Equinox 6.0 like X-Quiz_IT, Udyam, Mudit Vriddhi, Ops-Cogitate, Socialis Procurator saw increased participation from B-School campuses across India.

== See also ==
- Indian Institute of Management
