= Jeenagora =

- Neighbourhood in Dhanbad
- Location within Jharkhand Location within India
- Coordinates: 23.71088°N 86.44398°E
- Country: India
- State: Jharkhand
- District: Dhanbad
- Subdistrict: Jharia
- Time zone: UTC+05:30 (IST)
- Pincode: 828115

Jeenagora is a neighbourhood in Dhanbad in Dhanbad Sadar subdivision of Dhanbad district of Jharkhand.

== Geography ==
Cities, towns and locations in the southern portion of Dhanbad Sadar subdivision in Dhanbad district
MC: Municipal Corporation, CT: Census Town, N: Neighbourhood, R: Rural/ Urban centre
Owing to space constraints in the small map, the actual locations in a larger map may vary slightly

=== Location ===
Jeenagora is located at 23.71088°N 86.44398°E.

Note: The map alongside presents some of the notable locations in the area. All places marked in the map are linked in the larger full screen map.

Jeenagora is part of Ward No. 41 of Dhanbad Municipal Corporation.

It is located at a distance of 3.4 km from tehsil headquarters Jharia and is 9.6 km far from its district headquarters, Dhanbad. Among other nearby towns and villages, Tisra is located at distance of 3.0 km., Joyrampur at 0.7 km. and Lodna, the nearest railway station at distance of 2.1 km.

=== Overview ===
The region shown in the map is a part of the undulating uplands bustling with coalmines. The Damodar River, the most important river of the Chota Nagpur Plateau, flows along the southern border. A major part of the area shown in the map is part of Dhanbad Municipal Corporation, an urban area. The places in the DMC area are marked as neighbourhoods. The western part of the region shown in the map is covered by Dhanbad (community development block). 57% of the population of Dhanbad CD block reside in rural areas and 43% reside in urban areas, The east-central part of the region shown in the map is covered by Baliapur (community development block). 86% of the population of Baliapur CD block reside in rural areas and 14% reside in urban areas. The places in the CD block areas are marked mostly as census towns. Three operational areas of BCCL operate fully within the region – Pootkee Balihari Area, Lodna Area and Eastern Jharia Area. The Moonidih sector of Western Jharia Area also operates in the region.

== Economy ==
Jeenagora and surrounding areas have been coal mining center since more than hundred years and coal mines are now managed by Bharat Coking Coal Limited.

Collieries functioning in the Lodna Area are: Tisra, South Tisra, Jeenagora, Joyrampur, Lodna, Bagdigi, Jealgora and Bararee.
