= Central Institute of Petrochemicals Engineering and Technology =

Higher education institute in Tamil Nadu, India

- Type: Public
- Established: 1968; 58 years ago
- Affiliations: AICTE
- Academic affiliations: Anna University
- Director-General: Shishir Sinha
- Location: Chennai, India
- Campus: Urban
- Website: cipet.gov.in

The Central Institute of Petrochemicals Engineering and Technology formerly Central Institute of Plastics Engineering and Technology (or CIPET) is an autonomous institution under the Ministry of Chemicals and Fertilizes, Government of India.

== Overview ==
CIPET was established in 1968 at Chennai with a tie-up with United Nations Development Program (UNDP) and International Labor Organization (ILO). It has various campuses across the county. CIPET is having 43 operational centres, and nine more centres are in the process of establishment across the country catering to the needs of polymer and allied industries. The main objective of setting up of this specialized institute was to develop manpower in different disciplines of Plastics Engineering & Technology as no similar institute was in existence in the country. CIPET is a premier Academic institution for higher & technical education under the Ministry of Chemicals & Fertilizers, Govt. of India fully devoted in all the domains of plastics.

To offer blend of specialized Academic and Skill Development Training Programs in the field of Polymer Science & Technology in order to provide qualified Human Resources with entrepreneurship qualities for Polymer & Allied Industries;

To provide Technology Support in the form of Consultancy Services in the fields of design, tooling, plastics processing, testing & quality assurance and Inspection Services to the plastics industries through a Quality Management System;

Dedicated R & D wings on Plastic and polymeric Materials & Product development will develop New Polymeric Materials and its Applications from Technology Transfer, Intellectual Property (IP) and Knowledge Base.

Admission to these centers are through the joint entrance examination conducted every year by CIPET.
