= Chandra Bhan Prasad =

Indian writer

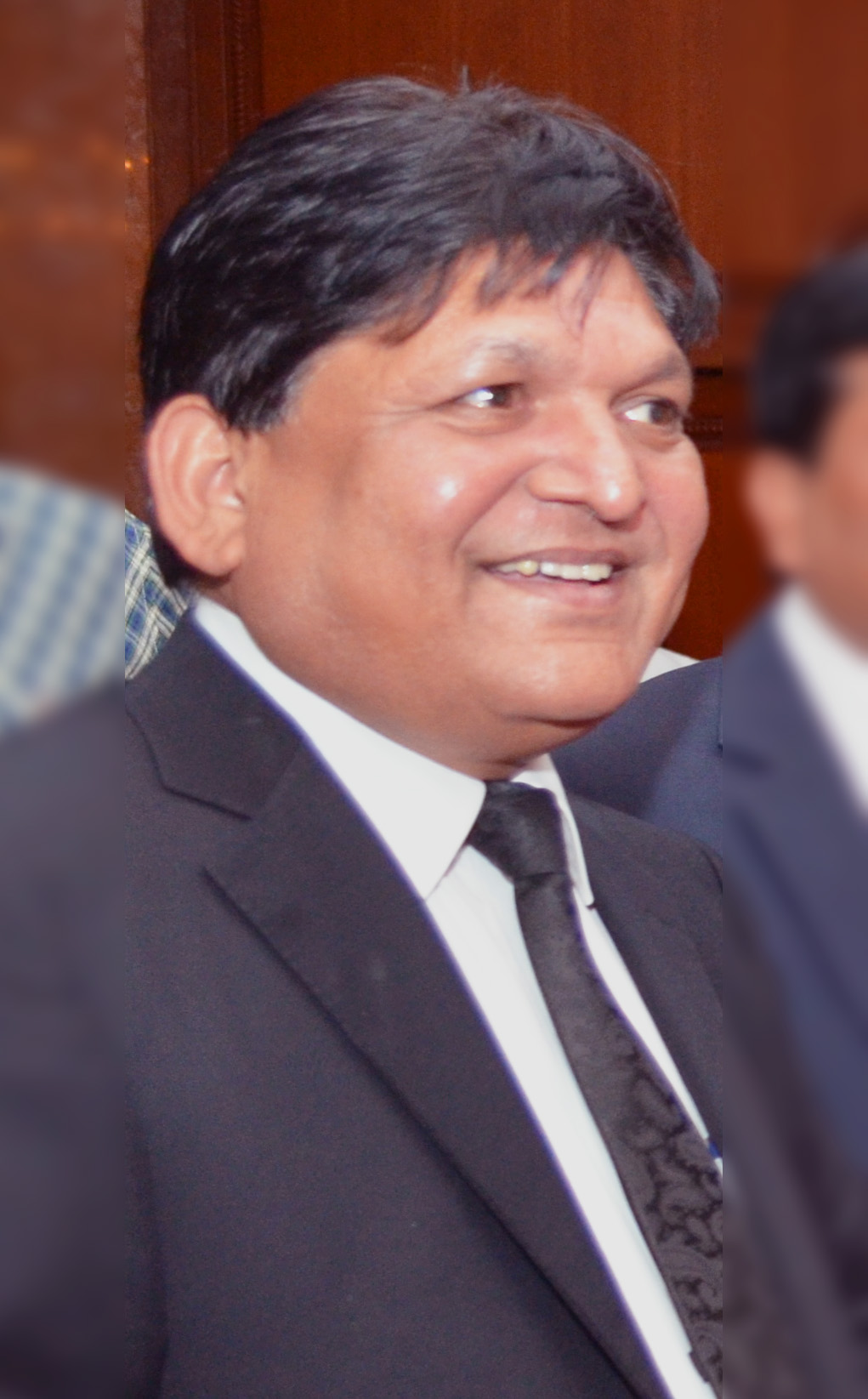
- Born: 1958 (age 67–68)
- Occupations: Journalist, writer, activist and political commentator

Chandra Bhan Prasad (born September 1958) is an Indian journalist, writer, activist and political commentator. He belongs to the Pasi (Dalit) community.

== Career ==
In 2007-08 Prasad was a visiting scholar at the Centre for the Advanced Study of India (CASI) at the University of Pennsylvania. He has been profiled by The New York Times and The Washington Post.
