= Ashok Khade =

Indian entrepreneur

- Born: c. 1955; Ped, Sangli district, Maharashtra, India
- Education: Diploma in Mechanical Engineering
- Occupation: Entrepreneur
- Known for: Co-founder and Managing Director of DAS Offshore
- Awards: Padma Shri (2026)

Ashok Khade (born c. 1955) is an Indian entrepreneur and the managing director of DAS Offshore Engineering Private Limited, a company that provides services to the offshore oil and gas industry. He is noted for rising from a background of poverty as a member of a Dalit family to establish a major engineering firm. He was featured in Milind Khandekar's book "Dalit Millionaires: 15 Inspiring Stories."

== Early life and education ==
Ashok Khade was born into a Chamar (Dalit) family in Ped, a village in the Sangli district of Maharashtra. He was one of the six children of the family. His father worked as a cobbler in Mumbai. Khade studied at a school run by a charity in the nearby town. After finishing his local schooling, Khade moved to Mumbai, where he started working as an apprentice draftsman at the Mazagon Dock. He has a diploma in Mechanical Engineering.

== Career ==
Khade began his career in 1975 at Mazagon Dock Shipbuilders, where he worked for over 15 years, eventually rising to an executive position in the quality control department. In the 1980s, he was part of a team sent on a multi-year work assignment to West Germany for a submarine project. This experience with international management and technology influenced his decision to become an entrepreneur.

In 1993, Khade co-founded DAS Offshore Engineering with his brothers, Datta and Suresh. The company provides fabrication services for the offshore oil and gas industry. It secured contracts with major clients, including the Oil and Natural Gas Corporation (ONGC) and Larsen & Toubro, for projects such as constructing offshore platforms, jackets, and subsea pipelines. By 2011, the company's annual turnover was reported to be over US$32,000,000 and employed over 4,500 people.
