= Dalit Indian Chamber of Commerce and Industry =

Indian business association

DICCI
- Founded: 2005; 21 years ago
- Founder: Milind Kamble
- Type: Chamber of commerce
- Members: 10000+
- Website: www.dicci.in

The Dalit Indian Chamber of Commerce and Industry (DICCI) is an Indian association that promotes business enterprises for Dalits. It was founded in 2005 by Milind Kamble. Some of the key members of DICCI are Kalpana Saroj, Chandra Bhan Prasad and Rajesh Saraiya.

== Organization ==
DICCI has 29 state chapters and 7 international chapters. Members of DICCI come from diverse range of manufacturing, services and construction sectors. It organizes trade fairs and training camps among other things, and carries out promotional activities for the Dalit MSMEs. The organization is headquartered in Pune.

== Activities ==
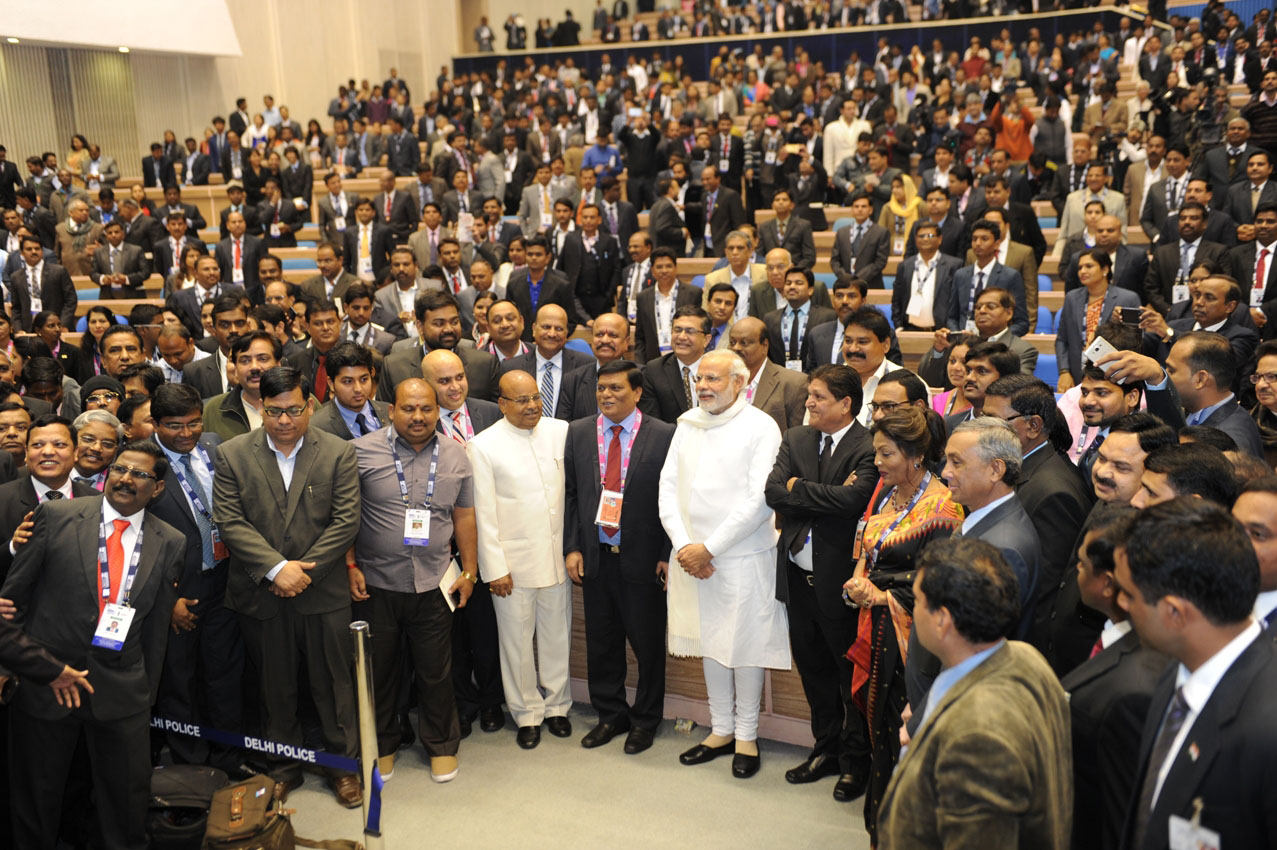
The National Conference of Dalit Entrepreneurs, organised by the DICCI

- DICCI organized its inaugural national trade fair in 2011 - attending were prominent figures such as Ratan Tata and Adi Godrej, chairman of the Godrej Group.
- In 2013, DICCI announced to float ₹500 crore venture capital fund to promote SC/ST entrepreneurs. SIDBI became first investor in the fund by announcing Rs 10 crore.
- On February 13–15, 2015, the fifth edition of the Dalit Indian Chambers of Commerce and Industry (DICCI) Industrial and Trade Expo was held, at the Hitex Exhibition Grounds in Madhapur. The expo featured the participation of 350 entrepreneurs from Scheduled Caste and Scheduled Tribe communities, showcasing a wide range of products from micro components to heavy machinery. Telangana CM Kalvakuntla Chandrashekar Rao announced one acre of land in Hyderabad and ₹5 crore financial assistance for setting up of a Dalit entrepreneur incubation centre.
- In December 2015, Narendra Modi inaugurated the National Conference of Dalit Entrepreneurs organised by DICCI
- In 2016, they organised the Entrepreneurship Development Programme, IGNITE 2016
- The DICCI had signed an agreement with the Delhi Jal Board (DJB) in 2019 to implement a technology-based solution for sewer cleaning and eliminate manual scavenging in Delhi. As part of the agreement, approximately 189 contractors from marginalized communities were employed to clean sewer lines. However, DICCI recently raised a complaint about non-payment of bills amounting to Rs.16 Crore by the government, resulting in unpaid salaries for sanitation workers and hindering the contractors' ability to cover essential expenses.
- In 2019, The Dr. Ambedkar International Centre (DAIC), Ministry of Social Justice and Empowerment and the Dalit Indian Chamber of Commerce and Industry (DICCI) signed a MoU to empower the Scheduled Caste (SC) and Scheduled Tribe (ST) communities through research on Dalit entrepreneurship, skill development, and capacity building. The partnership will include joint research, knowledge exchange, training programs, creation of a common platform for academic and policy research, and development of innovative learning platforms for workers and adult learners.
- In 2021, DICCI and TRIFED(Tribal Co-Operative Marketing Development Federation of India), has signed an MoU to promote entrepreneurship among Scheduled Tribes (ST) communities in India. The partnership involves joint policy research, capacity building programs, workshops, and exhibitions to create a sustainable marketplace for tribal products.
- In 2022, DICCI organised the SC/ST Mega Business Conclave and Expo in Bhopal, Madhya Pradesh. In attendance were then CM Shivraj Singh Chouhan and Union MoS for steel and rural development, Faggan Singh Kulaste
- In May 2023, DICCI signed a Memorandum of Understanding (MoU) with the Youth20 (Y20), the official engagement group of G20, during the National Conference of DICCI held at Ashoka Hotel on March 31, 2023. This collaboration aims to establish DICCI as the industry partner of Y20 in India.
