= Devesh Kapur =

Johns Hopkins University professor

Devesh Kapur is the Starr Foundation Professor of South Asian Studies at the Johns Hopkins University School of Advanced International Studies (SAIS). Formerly, he was the Director at the Center for the Advanced Study of India (CASI), Madan Lal Sobti Associate Professor for the Study of Contemporary India, and Professor of Political Science at the University of Pennsylvania. He is also a non-resident fellow at the Center for Global Development. He is also a monthly contributor to Business Standard, an Indian business news daily, and an occasional contributor to Project Syndicate.

Kapur's articles have also been published in The Guardian, Financial Times, Foreign Policy, and The Hindustan Times.

== Academic life ==
Kapur has a BTech and MTech in chemical engineering (from Banaras Hindu University and the University of Minnesota respectively) and a PhD in public policy from Princeton University. He taught at Harvard College, where he received the Joseph R. Levenson Teaching Prize awarded to the best junior faculty in 2005. In 2006, he joined the University of Pennsylvania and was appointed director of the Center for the Advanced Study of India there. In 2018, Kapur was appointed as Director of Asia Programs and Starr Foundation Professor of South Asian Studies at the Johns Hopkins University School of Advanced International Studies (SAIS).

== Books ==
Kapur is the author of Diaspora, Development, and Democracy: The Domestic Impact of International Migration from India, published by Princeton University Press. He has also co-authored the books The World Bank: Its First Half Century (Vol I and II) (an official history of the World Bank, with John Lewis and Richard Webb) and Give Us Your Best and Brightest: The Global Hunt for Talent and Its Impact on the Developing World (with John McHale). In 2014, he co-authored Defying the Odds: the Rise of Dalit Entrepreneurs, book containing biographical stories of twenty one Dalit entrepreneurs. His latest co-authored book, A Sixth of Humanity, was released in 2025 by HarperCollins. Co-authored with Arvind Subramanian, the book charts the development history of independent India.

== Other academic work ==
An article Kapur wrote titled "Remittances: The New Development Mantra?" was widely cited as a critique of the growing attention being paid to remittances in the development economics community, including The New York Times in an article about remittances.
