= R.N. Kao: Gentleman Spymaster =

Book about R.N. Kao and R&AW

- Author: Nitin A. Gokhale (Foreword by Ajit Doval)
- Language: English
- Genre: Intelligence Biography
- Published: 18 November 2019
- Publication place: India
- ISBN: 9789389449280

R.N. Kao: Gentleman Spymaster is a biography of Rameshwar Nath Kao, the founding chief of India's external intelligence agency, the Research and Analysis Wing (R&AW). Written by Nitin A. Gokhale, the book was published by Bloomsbury India in November 2019. The book is being adapted into a movie by Karan Johar.

== Background ==
Nitin A. Gokhale was informally approached to write a book on Kao. Through interviews with people (Note: Both Vikram Sood and Vappala Balachandran, who came to the book launch, had been recruited and worked with Kao.) who worked with Kao or were trained by him, Kao's declassified recordings and other official documents, meetings with his family, Gokhale managed to complete the book in 65 days.

The National Security Advisor of India, Ajit Doval, has written the foreword of the book. The book is only one of two (Note: The other is "Kaoboys of R&AW" written by B Raman.) books and the first-full-fledged book to be written about RN Kao. (Note: R&AW does not declassify its records.) Through the life of RN Kao, the book is a view into how the people and organisations that protect India's national interests were built.

== Contents ==
Gokhale writes about Kao's early years including the early death of his father, his university years all the way to his entrance into the police world in 1940 to 1947 when he joined the Intelligence Bureau, where his responsibilities included the security of the Prime Minister and foreign leaders visiting India. His major assignments such as the crash of Kashmir Princess are brought alive in the book, where Kao's interactions with the first Chinese premier Zhou Enlai are insightful. Gokhale goes on to describe successful Indian – US cooperation in intelligence, where Kao was in charge of setting up the Aviation Research Centre with US assistance.

Gokhale goes on to write about the causes that led up to the formation of R&AW and the circumstances under which Kao was made the first chief. It was here that Kao's abilities were fully visible, overseeing the merger of Sikkim and the partition of Pakistan, something which both the people of Sikkim and Bangladesh wanted respectively. (Note: Only when his (RN Kao's) record of the events is opened in 2025, as per his instructions, will the full extent of his role become public.) Gokhale also talks about how Kao had forewarned both Sheikh Mujib-ur-Rehman and Indira Gandhi before their assassinations.

== Publication ==
The book was published by Bloomsbury India in November 2019.

The book was launched by Indian Army Chief Bipin Rawat and former R&AW Chief Vikram Sood on 13 December 2019. A book discussion and launch also took place on 21 December 2019 in College of Engineering, Pune which was attended by Lt. Gen. Manoj Mukund Naravane (the then Chief of Army-designate), Vappala Balachandran (former Special Secretary, R&AW who worked with Kao) and Jayant Umranikar (former DGP Maharashtra and R&AW officer). Apart from directly talking about the book, Lt. Gen. Manoj Mukund Naravane said at the event that "military operations and intelligence go hand in hand" while Balachandran said the Official Secrets Act should be scrapped.

== Reception ==
Lt. Gen. Manoj Mukund Naravane said "its style of writing has captured the persona of the individual (Kao)" and "If given a chance, it (can be) made into a potboiler but that was not the intent. The character of the man (Kao) and the style in which the book is written actually complement each other."

The book is being adapted into a movie by Karan Johar.

== See also ==
- The Spy Chronicles
- The Unending Game
- Open Secrets
