= The Unending Game =

Book by Vikram Sood

The Unending Game: A Former R&AW Chief's Insights into Espionage
- First edition
- Author: Vikram Sood
- Publisher: Penguin Random House
- Publication date: 2018
- Publication place: India
- ISBN: 978-0-670-09150-8

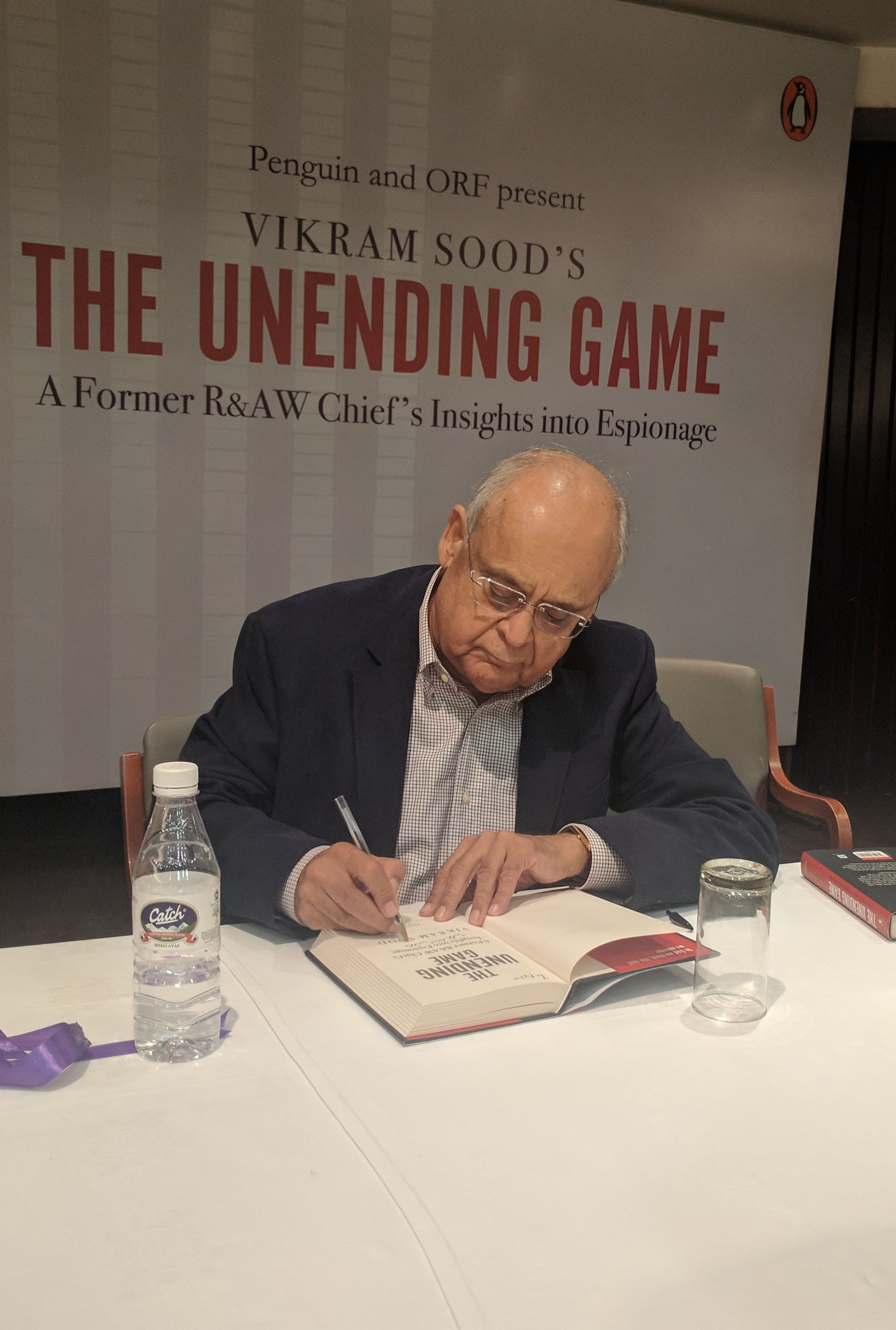
Author Vikram Sood during a book launch in New Delhi, 2018

The Unending Game: A Former R&AW Chief's Insights into Espionage is a 2018 book by Vikram Sood, former head of India's foreign intelligence agency, the Research and Analysis Wing (R&AW). According to Sood his book is not a memoir but a beginner's guide in intelligence and espionage. Sood tries to clarify that the real world of espionage is not like James Bond movies and much more than just "cloak and dagger" operations; with John le Carre's novels about George Smiley being a better comparison to the reality. The book further gives insights into the methods of intelligence collection and espionage and the relevance in the scope of a country's national interests.

== Description ==
The book covers the history and problems associated with espionage, its analysis and actions that are taken based on the information. It covers the workings of international intelligence agencies including the meddling of the KGB and the Central Intelligence Agency (CIA) in Indian politics. Events that led to the Kargil war in 1999 with Pakistan and Sood's tenure as secretary, R&AW from 2000 till 2003 when he retired is also discussed in the book. It also includes the trends in the field of espionage and analysis of major intelligence failures in the world such as the 9/11 attacks and the 26/11 attacks.

The book is divided into three parts. The book is divided into three concept related sections that are titled as "Tradecraft", "Inside Intelligence" and "What Lies Ahead." The prologue section of the book covers how R&AW found about the progress of the "clandestine nuclear weapons programme" of Pakistan.

Part 1, titled "Tradecraft", covers basics such as the definition and value of intelligence, the working of spies work and the traits of a perfect spy. Chapter 3 covers battles between America's CIA and Russia's KGB. Chapter 4 covers the intelligence world in Asia and the role of Inter-Services Intelligence (ISI). This chapter includes how in four years during the 1970s, the KGB planted nearly 17,000 stories in the Indian media, citing Mitrokhin's archive for the same. The book covers the top Indian officials and politicians that were on the payrolls of foreign intelligence agencies. The extent of psychological warfare in India, in the decades of 1970s and 1980s is also discussed. Mention of how Rabinder Singh, a R&AW official, was successfully infiltrated by America is also made. The book discusses Pakistan's preference of a low-cost warfare over conventional battle.

Part 2, titled "Inside Intelligence", talks about topics and organisation such as the Five Eyes, Snowden, Pinay Cercle, the Safari Club among others. The Cambridge Five are also discussed. Part 3, titled, "What Lies Ahead", discusses aspects such as the technological future of the intelligence world. Chapter 10 is titled, "Known by their failures", which discusses Kargil War and the assassination of a former Prime Minister of India, Rajiv Gandhi, in Sriperumbudur in 1991.

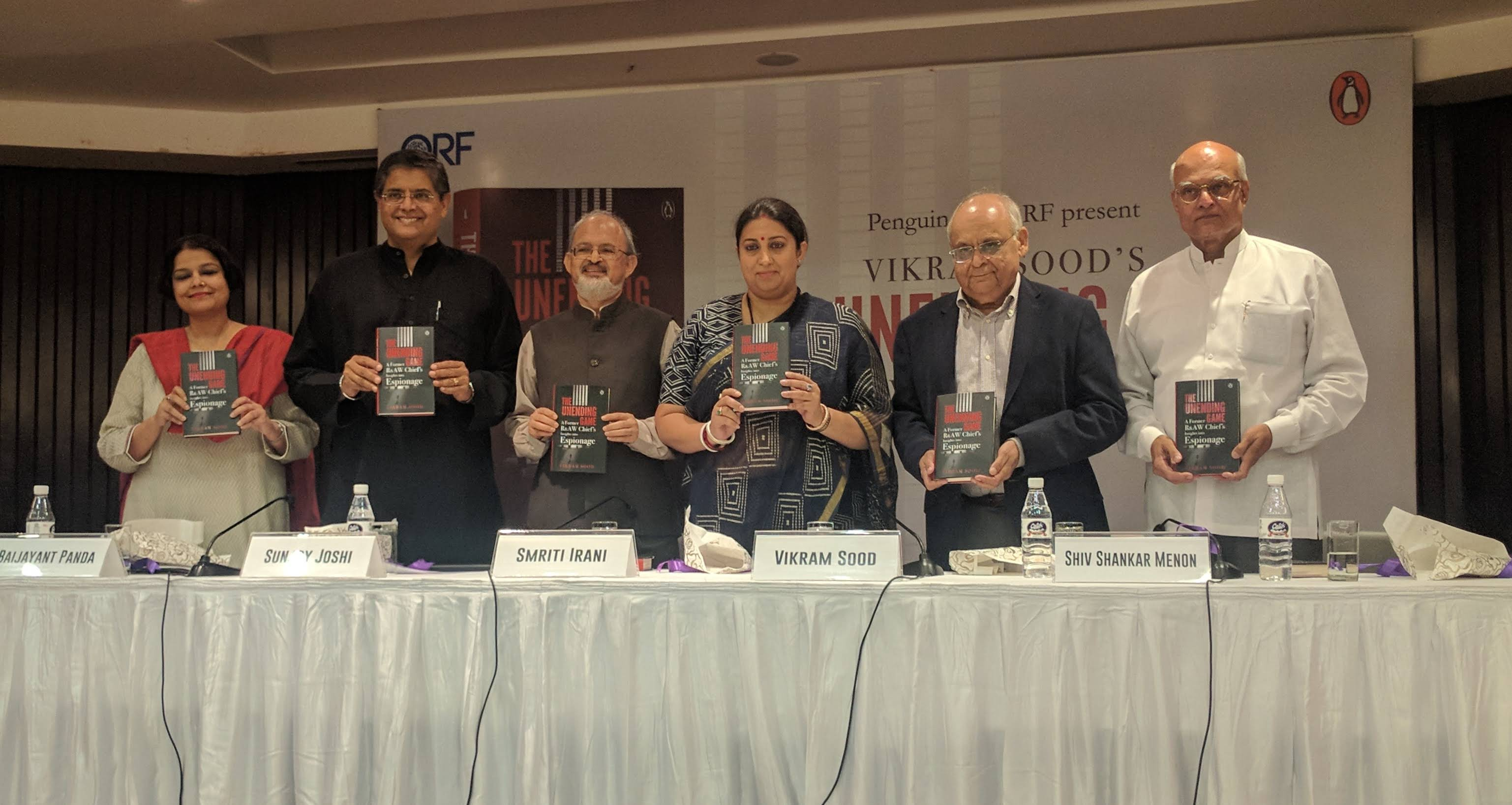
The book launch of "The Unending Game", at India International Center on 13 August 2018. Apart from Vikram Sood, also seen in the picture are Smriti Irani, Baijayant Panda and Shivshankar Menon.

Vikram Sood also briefly differentiates between India's R&AW and Pakistan's ISI, saying that the main difference is in the latter's ability to form policy, including foreign policy, whereas R&AW is just a "service provider" to the policymakers. In Chapter 11, the book discusses reforms and ways that R&AW could follow for appointing personnel on the key posts. According to Sood the intelligence agencies are the "sword arm of the nation (not the government)". During an interview with The Quint in 2018, Sood said that the rivalry between R&AW and ISI is exaggerated.

== Book launch ==
The book launch took place on 13 August 2018 at Delhi, followed by a panel discussion with the Union minister Smriti Irani, former national security advisor Shivshankar Menon, and former foreign secretary Kanwal Sibal. Several former chiefs and officials of the R&AW attended the book launch. At the book launch, Sood said that the Pakistan Army is the "largest corporate entity in Pakistan", and that peace talks with Pakistan are "futile". He stated that Kashmir is being used by the Pakistan army, as an excuse to be in power and have control over Pakistan. In 2016, following an attack in Baramulla on 3 October in which a Border Security Force soldier died, Sood had stated similar thoughts, that "unless Pakistan mends its ways, India should not hold talks."

== Response ==
India Today in its review stated that the book was "low-profile but solid contribution to the study of intelligence as a tool for formulating security policy in India and elsewhere".

== See also ==
- The Spy Chronicles: RAW, ISI and the Illusion of Peace
- R.N. Kao Gentleman Spymaster
- Open Secrets: India's Intelligence Unveiled
