= The Spy Chronicles =

2018 non-fiction book by Indian and Pakistani authors

The Spy Chronicles: RAW, ISI and the Illusion of Peace
- Cover of the first edition
- Author: AS Dulat, Asad Durrani and Aditya Sinha
- Publisher: HarperCollins
- Publication date: 2018
- Publication place: India
- ISBN: 978-9-352-77925-3
- Followed by: Honour Among Spies

The Spy Chronicles: RAW, ISI and the Illusion of Peace is a 2018 book in the format of a dialogue between two intelligence chiefs of India and Pakistan, AS Dulat and Asad Durrani, and moderated by Aditya Sinha. The conversations between the two intelligence chiefs took place during 2016 and 2017 in Istanbul, Kathmandu and Bangkok. AS Dulat is a former head of India's external intelligence agency, the Research and Analysis Wing (R&AW), Lt. Gen. Asad Durrani is a former head of Pakistan's external agency, Inter-Services Intelligence (ISI), and Aditya Sinha is an Indian journalist.

In 2020, Asad Durrani published a follow-up fictional book 'Honour Among Spies' about a Pakistani Lt General who faces repercussions for having co-authored a book with a former Indian intelligence chief.

== Authors ==
=== A. S. Dulat ===
A. S. Dulat is a former special director of India's Intelligence Bureau and former chief of the Research and Analysis Wing (R&AW) from 1999 to 2000. After retirement he was appointed as advisor on Kashmir in the Prime Minister's Office and served there from January 2000 to May 2004.

=== Asad Durrani ===
Lieutenant General Mohammad Asad Durrani is a retired 3-star rank general in the Pakistan Army and presently a commentator and speaker. Durrani previously served as the director-general of the Inter-Services Intelligence 1990-1991 and former director-general of the Pakistan Army's Military Intelligence 1988–1989.

=== Aditya Sinha ===
Aditya Sinha is an Indian author and journalist. He has been a journalist since 1987, occupying positions such as Editor-in-Chief of The New Indian Express and Daily News and Analysis (DNA). He has reported on terrorism in Punjab, Kashmir and Assam and has also done reporting from Peshawar, Pakistan. He started his journalistic career as a crime reporter in Delhi.

== Description ==
The book covers various topics such as Kashmir, Afghanistan, Ajit Doval, trade wars, the deep state, the 26/11 Mumbai attacks, Donald Trump, Vladimir Putin, Osama bin Laden, Hafiz Saeed, Balochistan, the 2016 surgical strikes and Kulbhushan Jadhav among other things. In the book Dulat says that ISI is a more influential intelligence agency; however, Durrani observes that "R&AW is at least as good as we are” but discusses that R&AW may have the upper hand because it has "career intelligence officers" whereas ISI consists of army men. In the book Durrani claims that Pakistan may have directed the American SEALs to Osama bin Laden in May 2011 as well as may have collected a payment for the cooperation and pretended to be surprised afterwards. Durrani also says that ISI's involvement in Kashmir has turned out to be less than successful.

A.S. Dulat and Asad Durrani have previously collaborated, writing a paper together titled "Kashmir: Confrontation to Cooperation" in 2013 published by the University of Ottawa. In the book Durrani notes this in the opening chapter, which also mentions another collaboration between the two after the 59th Pugwash Conference on Science and World Affairs in 2011, when they co-authored an article on intelligence cooperation which was published in The Hindu and Dawn.

Aditya Sinha says that the book has "no great revelations" but is "more about perspective" and "a metaphor for the actual relationship between the two countries."

== Aftermath ==
The book was released jointly by former Prime Minister of India Manmohan Singh and former Vice President of India Hamid Ansari as well as other dignitaries on 24 May 2018. The Indian government denied a visa to Asad Durrani to attend the book launch.

The publication of the book resulted in accusations of betrayal against Asad Durrani. On 28 May 2018, Pakistan placed Durrani on the "Exit Control List", barring him from leaving the country. An investigation headed by a three-star general was formed to ascertain whether Durrani violated Pakistan's military regulations. Former Prime Minister of Pakistan Nawaz Sharif demanded that the National Security Committee (NSC) should discuss the book. While addressing the Pakistan Senate in relation to the book, Raza Rabbani had said that if "a politician done the same thing he would have been labelled a traitor." However, in October 2018, Asad Durrani's lawyer said they had not received any notice of an inquiry and sought the removal of Asad Durrani's name from the Exit Control List.

Shazar Shafat, a security analyst, suggests two reasons in South Asian Voices (hosted by The Stimson Center) as to why Asad Durrani may be facing the backlash. The first is related to Durrani's comments on Akhand Bharat in the book such as "Akhand Bharat isn't a fantasy that nowadays some are thinking" (though Dulat calls the idea of Akhand Bharat in the book a "crazy, impractical idea") and the second is in relation to comments on Kulbhushan Jadhav. However, a report by CNN found that the book (as well as a pirated PDF version) was freely available in Pakistan and that the Pakistani government's "overreaction", according to Hassan Askari Rizvi and other defence analysts, may be because Durrani did not get prior permissions for such a book.

On 22 February 2019, Asad Durrani was found guilty of violating Pakistan's Military Code of Conduct for co-writing the book. Asad Durrani's pension and other allowances have been withdrawn, and it is yet to be decided if he should be taken off the Exit Control List.

=== Honour Among Spies ===
In 2020, Asad Durrani published a new book called Honour Among Spies. In spite of the disclaimer, "though inspired by some real events, this is a work of fiction" and "any resemblance to actual persons, living or dead, being entirely coincidental", commentators have noted that the hero, Pakistani Lt General Osama Barakzai, is Asad Durani. In the book General Barakzai faces repercussions for co-authoring a book with Indian ex-spy chief Randhir Singh.

== See also ==
- The Unending Game: A Former R&AW Chief's Insights into Espionage
- R.N. Kao Gentleman Spymaster
- Open Secrets: India's Intelligence Unveiled
