= Bahukutumbi =

Bahukutumbi or Bahukudumbi is a Tamil surname. It is associated with Srivaishnava Brahmins. Another related surname is Pillaippakkam Bahukutumbi or Pillaipakkam Bahukudumbi

== Notable people ==
- Bahukutumbi Raman, former chief of RAW and noted defence analyst
- Sujatha, noted Tamil writer, scientist and inventor of the Electronic Voting Machine
