= Vikram Sood =

Indian intelligence officer

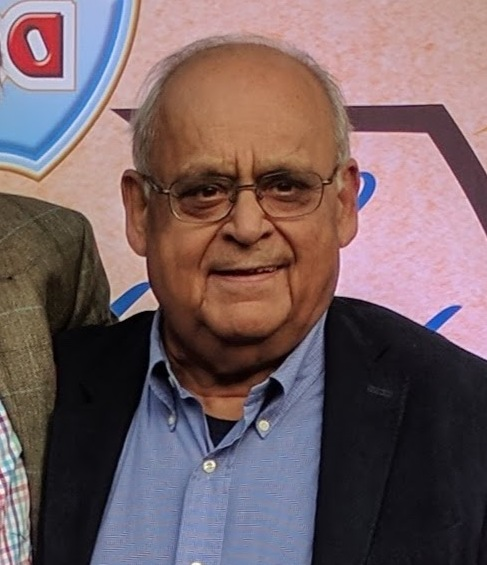

Secretary of the Research and Analysis Wing
- In office 2000–2003
- Preceded by: A. S. Dulat
- Succeeded by: C. D. Sahay

Personal details
- Born: New Delhi, India
- Education: St. Stephen's College, Delhi (M.A.)
- Profession: Spymaster

Vikram Sood is an Indian bureaucrat, former spymaster and the former head of India's foreign intelligence agency, the Research and Analysis Wing (R&AW), and an advisor to the Observer Research Foundation, an independent public policy think tank in New Delhi. Mr Vikram Sood is the First Secretary (R) to be from the RAS (RAW Allied Services) cadre in its more than four-decade history. Mr. Sood was an officer of the Indian Postal Service (IPoS) before he joined the intelligence organisation R&AW and later served as its secretary from 2000 to 2003. He retired as a career intelligence officer with 31 years of service on 31 March 2003.

He was trained under the mentorship of B. Raman and interviewed by R&AW's founding secretary R.N. Kao during induction. He is the author of the book The Unending Game: A Former R&AW Chief's Insights into Espionage published in 2018, which according to Sood is not a memoir but a beginner's guide to intelligence and espionage.

== Education ==
Sood studied at St. Columba's School, Delhi. He then completed his B.A. (Hons.) and an M.A. in Economics from St. Stephen's College, Delhi.

== Career ==
Sood was an officer of the Indian Postal Service (IPoS), a part of India's civil services, and was moved into the Research and Analysis Service (RAS) cadre in 1966. In a personal tribute in Rediff, Sood says his mentor was B. Raman, one of the founders of R&AW. He became familiar with Raman in 1972, when he was assigned to understudy his role and later to take over from him until 1974. Sood was asked to take over charge from Raman once again in 1983, and on a final occasion on Raman's retirement in 1994.

Sood's appointment was different from others, as he became a R&AW chief without having served as a police officer. Sood had replaced S Sunderrajan who was an Indian Police Service (IPS) officer of the Delhi cadre. Sood served as the head of R&AW after taking over from A.S. Dulat from 2000 to 2003 during the period when Atal Bihari Vajpayee was the Prime Minister of India. He retired as a career intelligence officer with 31 years of service on 31 March 2003. As the chief of R&AW he was the designated Secretary (R) and also the director general of security.

As of 2019, Sood has been acting as an advisor to the Observer Research Foundation, an independent public policy think tank in New Delhi. He writes regularly on national security, foreign relations and strategic issues.

== Views ==
=== Pakistan ===
At the event for his book launch, The Unending Game, Sood said that the Pakistan Army is the "largest corporate entity in Pakistan" and that Kashmir is being used by the Pakistan Army merely as a justification to maintain power in Pakistan. Sood takes a hardline stance, saying that Pakistan would need to "shut the machinery of terrorism" and provide proof that changes are happening for dialogue to happen. In 2016 he had voiced similar opinions, stating that dialogue with Pakistan is pointless and that unless Pakistan changes its approach, dialogue between the two countries should not happen.

In relation to Kulbhushan Jadhav, an Indian national who is in Pakistan's custody since March 2016 and is being tried by a military court on alleged charges of being a R&AW agent, Sood says that Pakistan has no "leverage" over India because of this matter. In an interview in 2019 he stated, "No spy worth his salt will be caught with his passport. The charges against him are laughable."

=== China ===
When it comes to China-Pakistan links, Sood is of the opinion that China takes actions such as supporting Pakistan in the UNSC in relation to Masood Azhar because of fear of retaliation from Islamic groups in Xinjiang (an autonomous region in China which partly borders Pakistan) other than of course protecting their interests in Gilgit-Baltistan and Balochistan in relation to CPEC. When it comes to just China, Sood says that the capabilities of China are much more than Pakistan and that India should take note. This statement was made during a seminar on 17 February 2019, three days after the Pulwama attack, where he had also said, "China in control of Pakistan is even worse."

== Publications ==
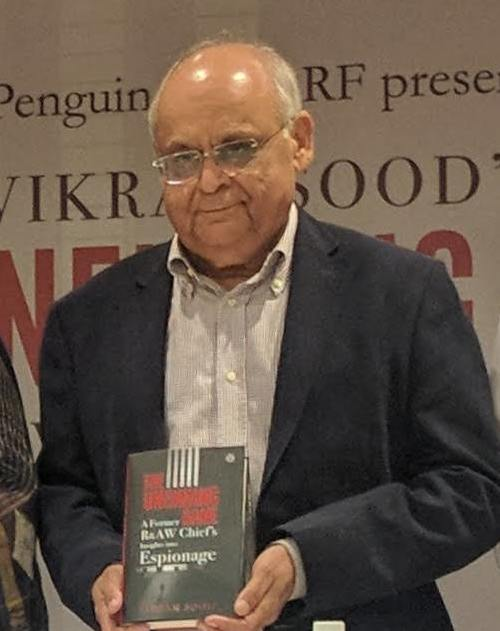
Sood at the book launch

In 2018 Sood wrote, The Unending Game: A Former R&AW Chief's Insights into Espionage, published by Penguin Viking. According to Sood, his book is not a memoir but a beginner's guide to espionage, a reference manual on intelligence. The book, which is divided into three concept related sections that are titled as "Tradecraft", "Inside Intelligence" and "What Lies Ahead", covers espionage during the two world wars, secret societies, psychological warfare in India, KGB and CIA interference in Indian politics, Pakistan and ISI, as well as intelligence failures in the world such as the 9/11 attacks and the 26/11 attacks among other things. Vappala Balachandran reviewed the book, writing that it is "a low-profile but solid contribution".

Year	Title	Co-author(s)	Publisher	Notes
2018	The Unending Game: A Former R&AW Chief's Insights into Espionage	—	Penguin Viking	a beginner's guide to espionage
2020	The Ultimate Goal: A Former R&AW Chief Deconstructs How Nations Construct Narratives	—	Harper India	explains 'the narrative' and how a country's ability to construct, sustain and control narratives, at home and abroad, enhances its strength and position.
2025	Great Power Games: From Western Decline to Eastern Ascent	—	Juggernaut	In this gripping narrative, Vikram Sood, former chief of the R&AW, reveals how nations pursue power. Behind the handshakes and communiqués lie covert operations, espionage, proxy wars, disinformation campaigns and economic coercion.

Preceded by A. S. Dulat	Secretary, R&AW; 2000–2003	Succeeded by C. D. Sahay
