= A. S. Dulat =

Indian intelligence official (born 1940)

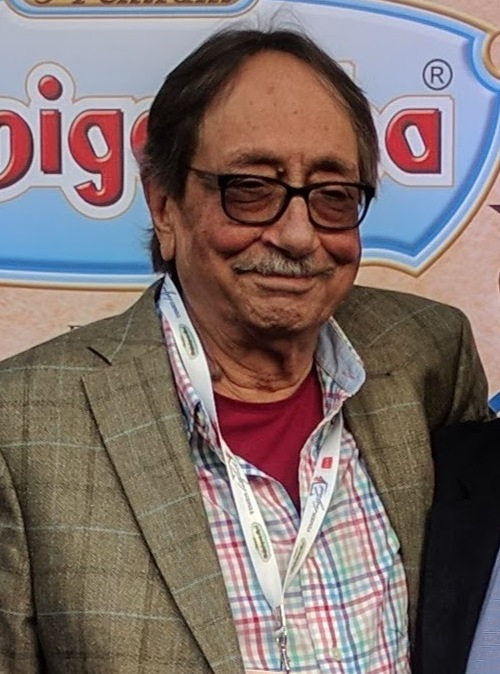

Secretary of the Research and Analysis Wing
- In office 1999–2000
- Preceded by: Arvind Dave
- Succeeded by: Vikram Sood

Personal details
- Born: Amarjit Singh Dulat; 1940 (age 85–86)
- Education: Bishop Cotton School, Shimla; Panjab University
- Profession: Spymaster

Amarjit Singh Dulat (born 1940) is an Indian bureaucrat former spymaster and a former special director of the Intelligence Bureau he also served as Secretary of the Research and Analysis Wing from 1999 to 2000. After retirement, he was appointed as an advisor on Jammu and Kashmir in the Prime Minister's Office and served there from January 2000 to May 2004.

== Career ==
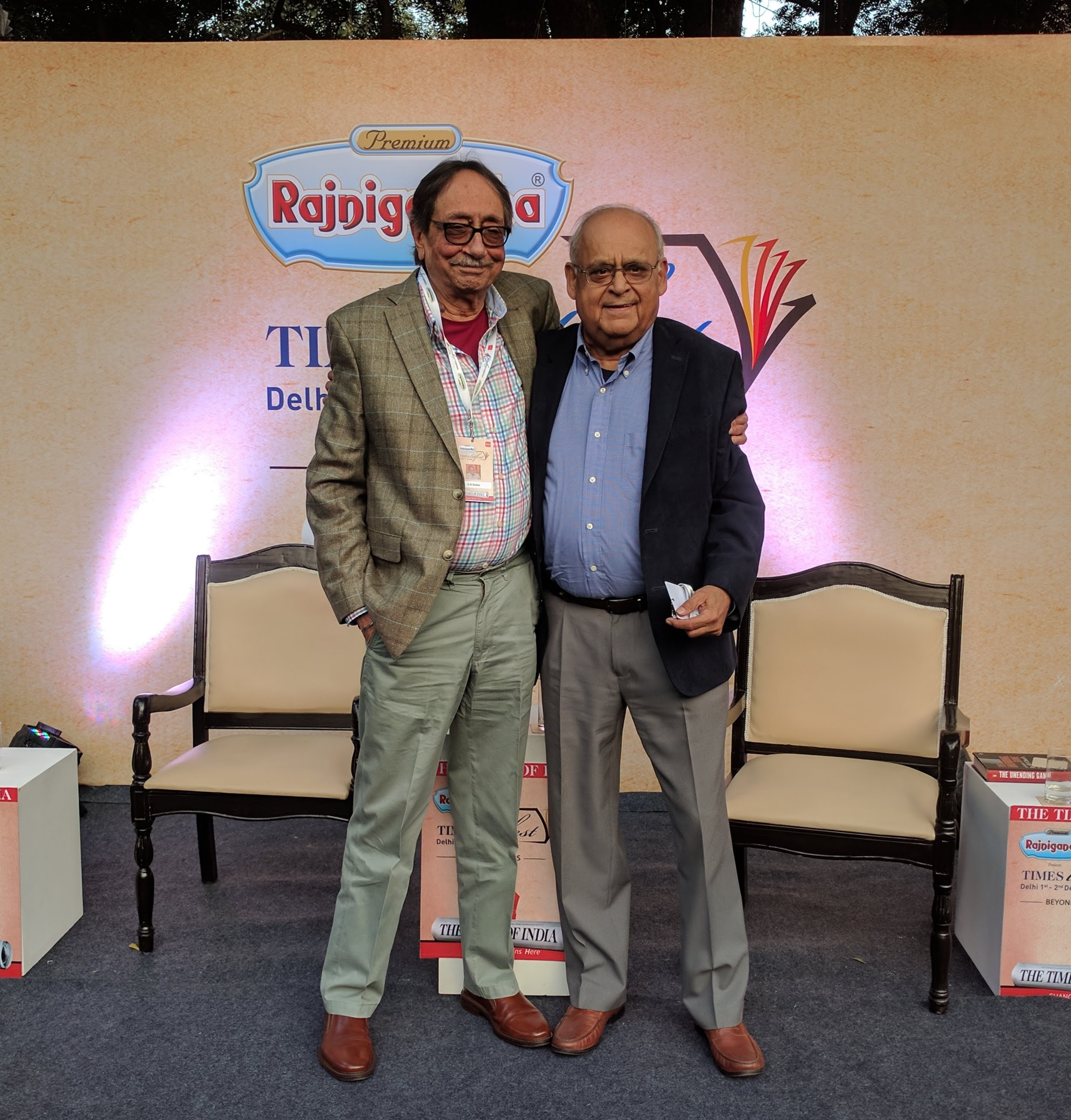
Dulat (left) with his successor, former chief of R&AW, Vikram Sood.

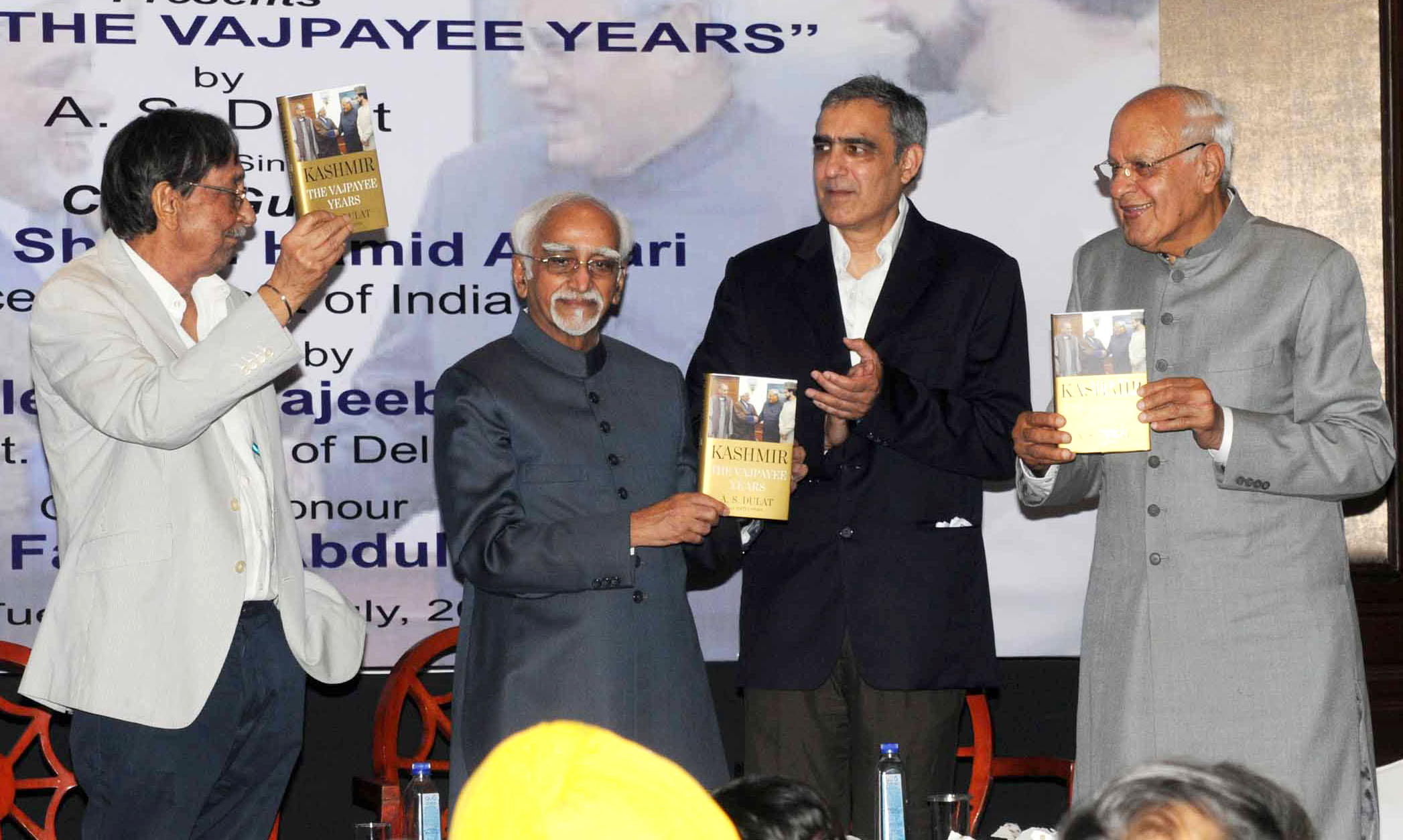
The Vice President of India, Hamid Ansari releasing the book Kashmir: The Vajpayee Years authored by Dulat in New Delhi on 21 July 2015. Also visible are Farooq Abdullah and Najeeb Jung.

Born in a Sikh Dulat family, Dulat joined the Indian Police Service from Rajasthan Cadre in 1965, and in March 1969, joined the Intelligence Bureau. He was educated at Bishop Cotton School, Shimla and graduated from Panjab University, Chandigarh.

He served in Kashmir as Joint Director in the Intelligence Bureau from 1988 to 1990 which was arguably the most troublesome time in the valley. His entered Kashmiri politics in 1990 through Shabir Shah, whom he called "big daddy of militants." He then moved to Intelligence Bureau where he was promoted to the rank of Special Director. In 1999, he became chief of Research and Analysis Wing until his December 2000 retirement.

== Post retirement ==
His 2015 book Kashmir: The Vajpayee Years, earned media attention. In 2018, he co-authored The Spy Chronicles: RAW, ISI and the Illusion of Peace with Asad Durrani, former head of the Inter-Services Intelligence.

Dulat has criticised Ajit Doval, the National Security Advisor, by calling Doval "hawkish" for his hardline position on handling border disputes with China. In Dulat's book, A Life In The Shadows: A Memoir, published in 2022, a full chapter was focused on Doval strategy of "muscular power" in Kashmir. In 2023, he also criticised Doval's doctrine for handling the Kashmir conflict with Pakistan.

== In popular culture ==
Dulat has been portrayed in certain recent Indian cinema and web series in rather compromising light. They include Aditya Dhar’s Dhurandhar (2025/2026) and Anubhav Sinha’s IC 814: The Kandahar Hijack (2024). These portrayals frame him as an intelligence official with "dovish" or "soft approach" to national security, particularly in Kashmir, undermining India's interests.

== Bibliography ==
- Kashmir: The Vajpayee Years (with Aditya Sinha) (HarperCollins, 2015) ISBN 978-9351770664
- The Spy Chronicles: RAW, ISI and the Illusion of Peace (with Asad Durrani and Aditya Sinha) (HarperCollins, 2018) ISBN 978-9352779253
- A Life In The Shadows: A Memoir (HarperCollins, 2022) ISBN 978-9356295964

Preceded by Arvind Dave	Secretary, R&AW; 1999 - 2000	Succeeded by Vikram Sood
