= Aditya Sinha =

Indian author and journalist

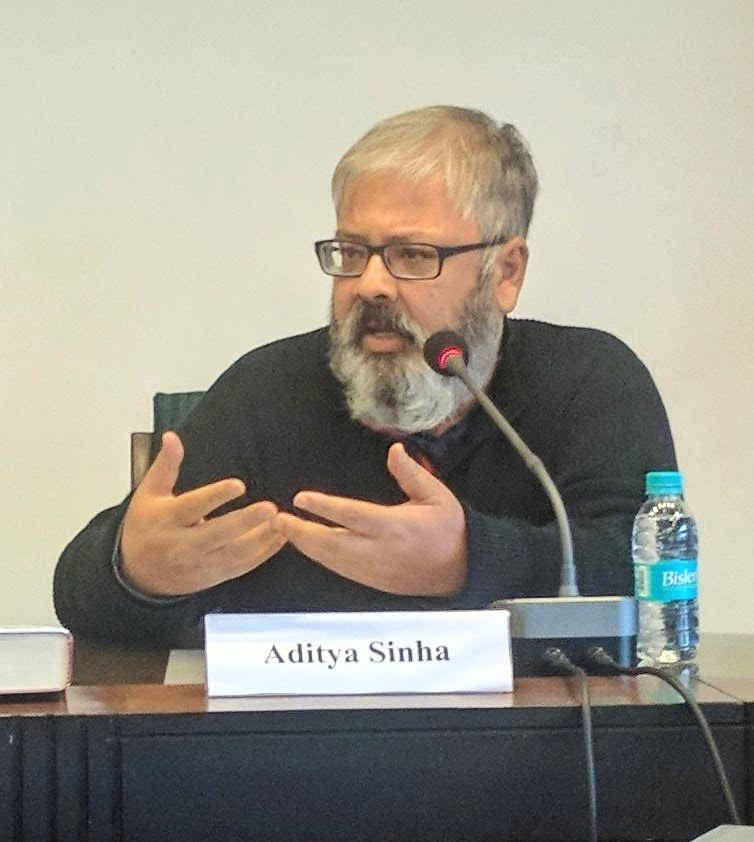
- Occupations: Journalist, Author

Aditya Sinha is an Indian author and journalist. His last assignment was as the Editor-in-Chief of the Deccan Chronicle, based in Hyderabad, which also publishes the Asian Age in Delhi. He has been a journalist since 1987, occupying positions such as Editor-in-Chief of The New Indian Express and DNA. He has reported on terrorism in Punjab, Kashmir and Assam and has also done reporting from Peshawar, Pakistan. He started out as a crime reporter in Delhi.

Aditya Sinha has authored three books and co-authored three books. Among the books he has co-authored, includes "The Spy Chronicles: RAW, ISI and the Illusion of Peace", co-authored with a former R&AW chief, AS Dulat, and ISI chief, Asad Durrani. His first work of fiction was "The CEO Who Lost His Head" published in 2017.

== Personal life ==
Aditya Sinha was born in Muzaffarpur, Bihar. He grew up in New York City, attending Stuyvesant High School. He has a bachelor's degree from Johns Hopkins University (1985), an MA from the School of Oriental Studies (SOAS) (1986) and an MA from Delhi University (2000). He lives in Hyderabad.

== Books ==
=== Author ===
- The CEO Who Lost His Head. Pan Macmillan, 2017. ISBN 9781509859368
- Death of Dreams: A Terrorist's Tale (2000). ISBN 9788172233907
- Farooq Abdullah: Kashmir's Prodigal Son - A Biography. UBS Publishers' Distributors, 1996. ISBN 9788174760722

=== Co-Author ===
- India Unmade: How The Modi Government Broke The Economy. Co-authored with Yashwant Sinha. Juggernaut, 2018. ISBN 9789386228864
- The Spy Chronicles: RAW, ISI and the Illusion of Peace. Co-authored with A. S. Dulat and Asad Durrani. HarperCollins, India, 2018. ISBN 9789352779253
- Kashmir: The Vajpayee Years. Co-authored with A. S. Dulat. HarperCollins, India, 2016 ISBN 9789352640812
