= India Unmade =

2018 non-fiction book

India Unmade: How the Modi Government Broke the Economy
- Authors: Yashwant Sinha, Aditya Sinha
- Publisher: Juggernaut Books
- Publication date: 2018
- Pages: 264
- ISBN: 9789386228864
- Website: Juggernaut Books

India Unmade: How the Modi Government Broke the Economy is a book coauthored by Yashwant Sinha and Aditya Sinha published in 2018. The book criticizes the economic performance of the National Democratic Alliance government near the end of its tenure prior to the 2019 Indian general election.

== Authors ==
The book is coauthored by Yashwant Sinha, who served as the Minister of Finance and Minister of External Affairs during the Vajpayee Government, and Aditya Sinha.

== Description ==
The book criticizes the economic performance of the National Democratic Alliance (NDA) government led by Narendra Modi as the Prime Minister between the period 2014-2019. The topics covered in the book include the alleged manipulation of the gross domestic product of India, the alleged irregularities in the 2016 Indian banknote demonetisation and the alleged interference with the independence of Reserve Bank of India. The authors of the book criticise the Make in India programme and consider the implementation of the Goods and Services Tax to be shoddy. The authors of the book say that Narendra Modi missed a golden opportunity to transform the Indian economy, pointing out the large electoral mandate he received. The authors also argue that the previous NDA government led by AB Vajpayee was politically and ideologically different than the present one.

While criticizing Modi, Yashwant Sinha says that he has no conflict of interest in writing this book since he has no plans to run for a political office.

== Reception ==
The Hindu describes the book to be "neither an economic treatise, nor a political pamphlet". It states that the book reveals the lack of democracy within the Bharatiya Janata Party, as exemplified by the hurried compilation of the book. The Financial Express considers the book to be one-sided despite constituting an "interesting reading".
