= Maloy Krishna Dhar =

Indian intelligence officer

Maloy Krishna Dhar IPS
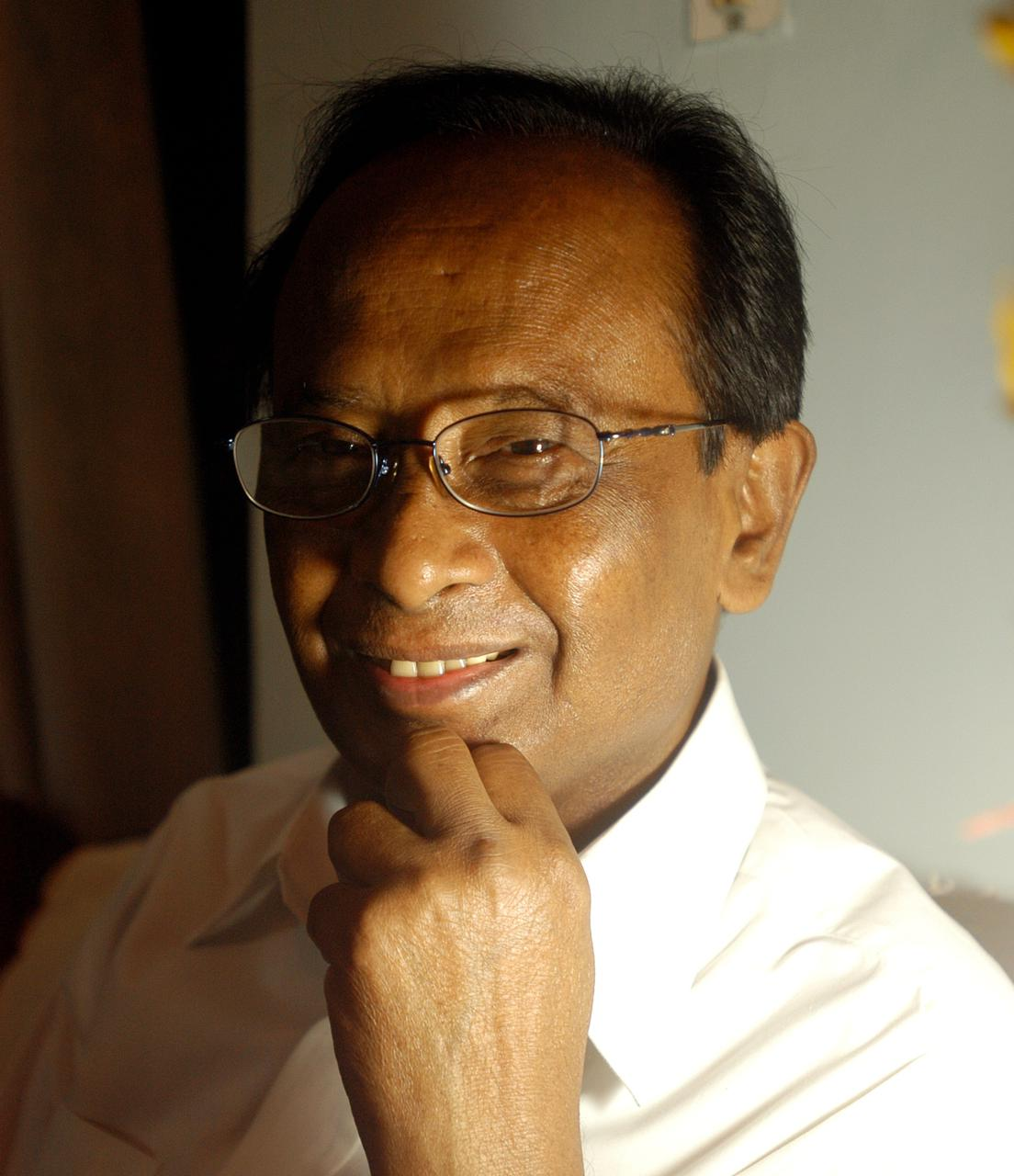
- Dhar in 2011

Joint Director of the Intelligence Bureau of India
- In office 1968–1997
- Directors: V. G. Vaidya; D. C. Pathak; Abhijit Mitra; Arun Bhagat
- Prime Ministers: P. V. Narasimha Rao; Atal Bihari Vajpayee; H. D. Deve Gowda; I. K. Gujral

Personal details
- Born: 13 July 1939 Bhairab-Mymensingh, East Bengal, British India (present day Bangladesh)
- Died: 19 May 2012 (aged 72) Delhi, India
- Spouse: Sunanda Dhar
- Children: 2
- Education: University of Calcutta
- Profession: Indian Police Service (IPS), Spymaster
- Known for: Counter-intelligence operations; author of Open Secrets: India's Intelligence Unveiled

Maloy Krishna Dhar (13 July 1939 – 19 May 2012) was an Indian intelligence officer, spymaster and an author who served in the Intelligence Bureau (IB), India's domestic intelligence agency.

== Early life and education ==
Dhar was born in Kamalpur, Bhairab-Mymensingh in East Bengal, and relocated to West Bengal with his family during the Partition of India. Following his completion of a master's degree in Bengali literature and language and comparative literature from the University of Calcutta.

== Career ==
He served from 1964 to 1968 in the West Bengal cadre of the Indian Police Service (IPS) and, in 1968, was deputed to the Intelligence Bureau, where he spent the rest of his career.

Throughout his extensive career, he held significant positions during important periods, such as the insurgency period in Manipur and Nagaland in the early 1970s. He also played a role in Sikkim between 1975 and 1979, during its formal merging as a state. Additionally, he was involved in handling sensitive operations related to counterintelligence and counterterrorism. From 1983 to 1987, he was stationed in Canada, a time marked by the increasing rise of the Khalistan movement and the Kanishka bombing.

After reaching retirement age, he pursued a career as an independent writer and journalist, contributing articles to all the prominent English newspapers, specifically focusing on India's intelligence system.

== Death ==
Dhar died on May 19, 2012, following a month-long struggle with deteriorating health. It began with a stroke and was further complicated by renal and multi-organ failure.

== Publications ==
- Bitter Harvest : A Saga of The Punjab (1996)
- Open Secrets: India's Intelligence Unveiled (2005)
- Fulcrum of Evil: ISI-CIA-Al Qaeda Nexus (2006)
- Black Thunder: Dark Nights of Terrorism in Punjab (2009)
- Train to India: Memories of Another Bengal (2009)
- We the People of India: A Story of Gangland Democracy (2010)
- Shakti: Real-life Stories Celebrating Women Power (2012)
- The Ghost Wars of Tepantar (2012)
