= P. N. Banerjee =

Indian Police Service officer

Phanindra Nath Banerjee
- P. N. Banerjee (extreme left), with Sheikh Mujibur Rahman and his family. Banerjee's son Saumitra is at extreme right.
- Born: 2 June 1912; India
- Died: 24 July 1974 (aged 62); Dhaka
- Other name: Nath Babu
- Education: University Law College, Calcutta; Presidency College, Calcutta
- Known for: Intelligence activities before and during Bangladesh War; Intelligence activities leading to merger of Sikkim into India
- Children: Saumitra "Bobby" Banerjee (journalist)
- Espionage activity
- Allegiance: India
- Agency: Intelligence Bureau and Research and Analysis Wing
- Service years: 1943–1959 (state service); 1959–1974 (central service)

Phanindra Nath Banerjee (2 June 1912 – 24 July 1974) was an Indian Police Service officer serving as Commissioner (Eastern Zone) of the Special Bureau (field formation of the Research and Analysis Wing) in Calcutta (now Kolkata) in the period 1968-1974.

He had co-ordinated the Indian intelligence efforts before and during the Bangladesh War, including training of the Mukti Bahini, securing intelligence for the future Army operations etc. and was R&AW's primary link with the East Pakistan leaders. He had also co-ordinated the merger of Sikkim into India, along with the then R&AW chief R. N. Kao and R&AW's successive station chiefs in Gangtok, Ajit Singh Syali and Gur Bakhshish Singh Sidhu.

== Early life ==
Banerjee received his M.A. and B.L. degrees from the Presidency College and University Law College, Calcutta, respectively. He got appointed into the IPS through the Emergency Recruitment Scheme on 15 August 1949, with retrospective year of allotment as 1943 1/2. Thereafter he served as S.P. of Bankura and in Tripura. He joined central deputation on 4 February 1959 in the Intelligence Bureau.

== Sheikh Mujib's London meetings ==
As mentioned by Sukharanjan Dasgupta, a journalist who covered the Bangladesh War on behalf of Anandabazar Patrika, Indira Gandhi, then a minister in the Lal Bahadur Shastri government, had gone to London to represent India in the January 1966 Commonwealth Prime Ministers' Conference, where Banerjee arranged a meeting between her and Sheikh Mujibur Rahman, in the Southampton Road residence of Tarapada Basu. In that meeting, it was decided that East Pakistan will get separated from Pakistan if the six points are not met, similar to how Pakistan got separated from India when Jinnah's fourteen points were not met. In October 1969, following the 1969 East Pakistan mass uprising, Mujib again went to London, on the pretext of appendicitis surgery. The real purpose was a meeting with P.N. Banerjee, secret envoy of Mrs. Gandhi, as mentioned by Shahriar Kabir. Armed liberation war with Indian help was planned in that meeting, as per Tofael Ahmed.

== Role in Bangladesh War ==
On creation of R&AW in 1968, Banerjee, then Joint Director (East) in the IB, followed Kao into the new organisation, and became posted as Commissioner (equivalent to Joint Secretary) in Calcutta. He became one of Kao's core team. Operations in East Pakistan came under his purview. Banerjee based his operations in Dhaka and went under the alias "Nath Babu"; leaders including Sheikh Mujibur Rahman addressed him as such. In one of his deception schemes, he fed misinformation to the Americans, by using Khondaker Mostaq Ahmad, that India was in no position to undertake a military operation in East Pakistan due to insurgency in Northeast India and the Naxalite uprising in West Bengal; and all the while, Indian army got ready to enter East Pakistan, under the guise of tracking the Naxalites. Banerjee was the overall in-charge, from the Indian side, of the provisional Bangladesh government-in-exile, established in Calcutta on 14 April 1971, and coordination of all overt and covert guerrilla operations inside East Pakistan.

== Role in merger of Sikkim ==
Later, in December 1972, when the Chogyal (king) of Sikkim was pressuring India to revise the Indo-Sikkim Treaty, the Prime Minister of India, Indira Gandhi, called Kao and asked him to do something about Sikkim. Banerjee, under whose purview the Sikkim operations came, prepared a strategy within a fortnight, which was instantly cleared by Mrs. Gandhi and ultimately culminated into merger of Sikkim into India. Banerjee and Ajit Singh Syali (then OSD in Gangtok and later, chief of R&AW) launched an operation codenamed Janamat and Twilight, by which they undermined the monarchy by strengthening the agitations of the Sikkim National Congress, led by Kazi Lhendup Dorjee. By 8 April 1973, the Chogyal was forced to sign a draft treaty with India, which stated that the administration would be taken over by India.

== Death ==
Banerjee's death has been a subject of significant speculation and controversy. His death was officially attributed to a heart attack. However, some reports suggest he may have been poisoned after a meal in Dhaka. At the time, Banerjee was serving as the direct liaison between Indian Prime Minister Indira Gandhi and Bangladesh's founding leader, Sheikh Mujibur Rahman. It is speculated that he may have been targeted because he had discovered a conspiracy against Rahman, who was assassinated the following year.
