= Rabinder Singh (intelligence officer) =

Indian intelligence officer; defected to the U.S.

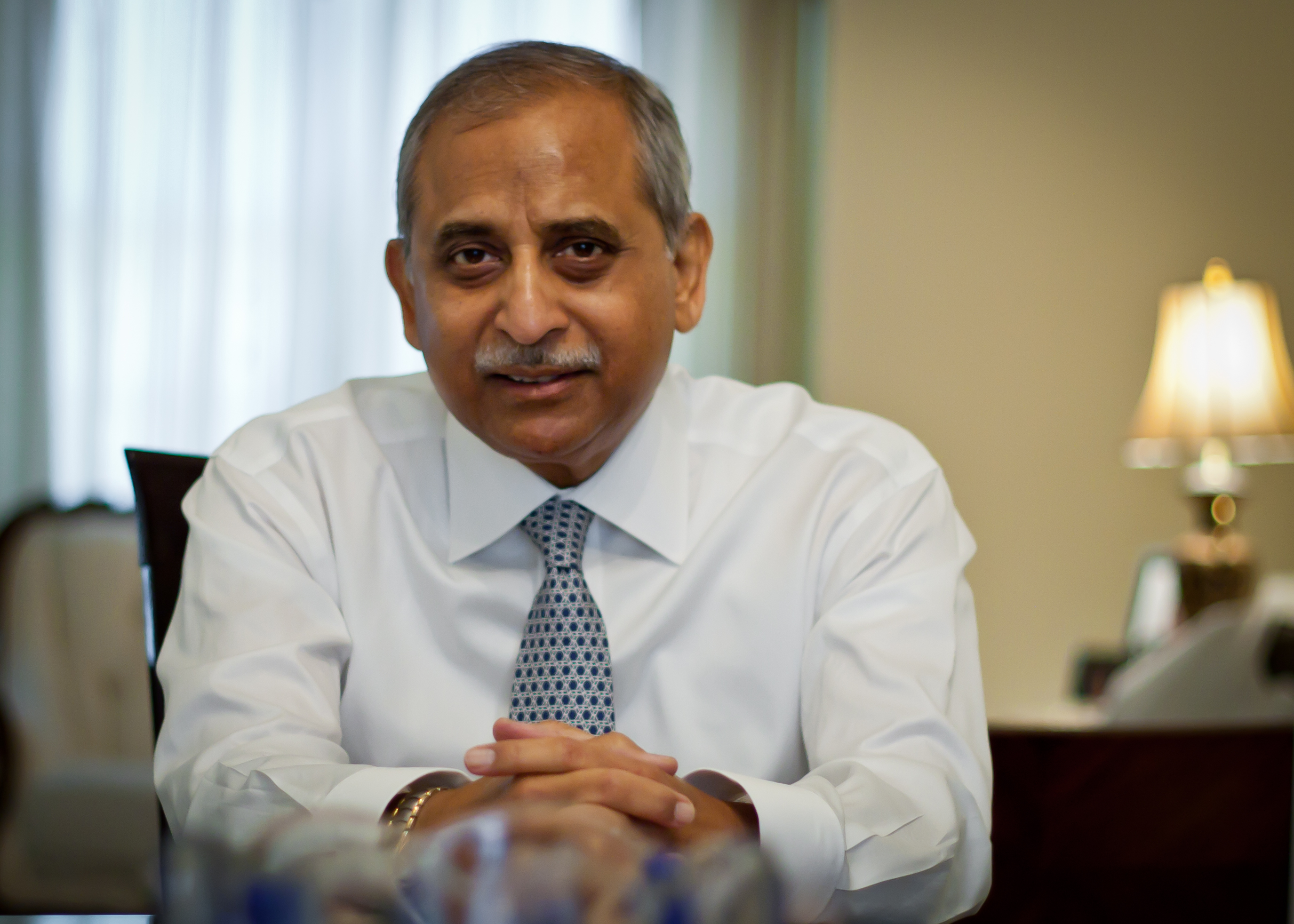

Rabinder Singh was an Indian Army officer and Research & Analysis Wing (RAW) officer. He is known for spying for the Central Intelligence Agency (CIA) and defecting to the United States in 2004. He was killed in a car crash in Maryland in 2016.

He was charged under Official Secrets Act and Indian Penal Code. In 2007, Central Bureau of Investigation requested Interpol to issue red corner notice, which was refused.

== Early life and education ==
Rabinder was born to an affluent family in Amritsar, the son of a retired lieutenant in the Indian Army.

== Career ==
Singh initially served in the Indian Army and joined the Gorkha regiments, reaching the rank of Major and later took a volunteer retirement. He later volunteered to join Research & Analysis Wing. He served as First Secretary in the Indian Embassy at Damascus, Syria.

During his tenure in RAW, Singh worked as head of its office in Amritsar and then as a field operative in West Asia and West Europe. He later served as Joint Secretary to the Government of India at R&AW headquarters in New Delhi and focused on its South-East Asia operations.

In 2004, Rabinder was dismissed by the Government of India after getting the President of India nod for the move (Article 311 of the Constitution (withdrawal of Presidential pleasure).

== Defection claims ==
It has been alleged that he fell for a CIA honey-trap, likely either at the R&AW station in Damascus or Hague during the early 1990s by a female case officer of the CIA. According to reports, he attracted attention from counter-intelligence officials when he was found photocopying documents not related to his work. After coming under suspicion, he was placed under surveillance and his phone conversations were tapped, but in May 2004, he disappeared. He is suspected of having escaped to the U.S. via Nepal.

In Mission R&AW, a book written by a former R&AW officer, it is claimed that Singh flew to America from Kathmandu along with his wife on 7 May 2004 using a fake identity in the names of Mr and Mrs Rajpal Prasad Sharma. Prabhu Chawla, writing in the New Indian Express stated that R&AW had managed to get copies of their visas and embarkation cards prior to take off. These documents reveal that the CIA, on 7 April 2004, issued US passport number 017384251 to Singh. His wife Parminder Kaur was also given a US passport on the same day in the name of Deepa Kumar Sharma. Both boarded Austrian Air flight number 5032 on 7 May 2004, from Kathmandu. He was assisted by CIA operative David M Vacala.

== Tracking in the USA by R&AW ==
In 2007, in an affidavit submitted to the court, R&AW deposed that Singh has been traced to New Jersey. It is believed that, meanwhile, Singh has filed for asylum in US, under the name of Surenderjeet Singh, which was rejected by the trial court of India but remanded back for reconsideration by the court of appeals. There has been no official proof however that Surenderjeet Singh is an alias of Rabinder Singh.

"Singh, a native of India, was raised as a Sikh and practices the Sikh religion. According to his testimony, he was recruited by an organ of the government of India known as the Research and Analysis Wing (RAW), situated in the office of the Prime Minister. Its functions, he testified, were like those of the CIA. As an agent of the RAW, he made reports on individuals believed to be Sikhs working to establish the separate Sikh state of Khalistan. He investigated about three persons a year over a period of thirteen years. He submitted postal receipts that he said showed his mailings to the RAW. He quit when ordered to aid in the assassination of a very religious person he had investigated. After hiding with friends for a year, he used his own passport to come to the United States. He testified that he would be killed if returned to India." Excerpt from the United States Court of Appeals.

Reports suggest Singh left his role under ambiguous circumstances in 2004, amidst allegations of intelligence ties with the CIA. Subsequent narratives, including claims from a former R&AW officer's book, provided varying accounts of Singh's journey post-2004.

== Death controversy ==
According to Indian government sources, he was killed in Maryland in the USA in a road accident in late 2016. He was living there as a refugee, having been cash-strapped after the CIA had stopped paying him money. US intelligence had blocked his application for asylum and his attempts to obtain a job with a think tank run by a former CIA senior officer were blocked too.

== Personal life ==
Rabinder was married to Parminder Kaur who worked at United States Agency for International Development. They lived in Defence Colony, while living in New Delhi.

== Popular culture and depictions ==
In spy thriller film Khufiya released in year 2023, actor Ali Fazal plays the role of Rabinder Singh, who served as Joint Secretary in RAW and a double agent.

== External sources ==
- Detailed news report on Rabinder Singh
