= Vappala Balachandran =

Indian national security intelligence specialist (born 1937)

RAS Vappala Balachandran IPS (Retired)

Special Secretary of the Cabinet Secretariat
- In office 1992–1995
- President: Shankar Dayal Sharma
- Prime Minister: P. V. Narasimha Rao
- Preceded by: Classified

Personal details
- Born: 15 June 1937 (age 89) Burma
- Relatives: V.P. Menon
- Education: (B.A.) & (M.A.) Loyola College, Madras
- Awards: Indian Police Medal; President's Police Medal
- Police career
- Allegiance: India
- Branch: Maharashtra Police
- Service years: 1959 — 1976
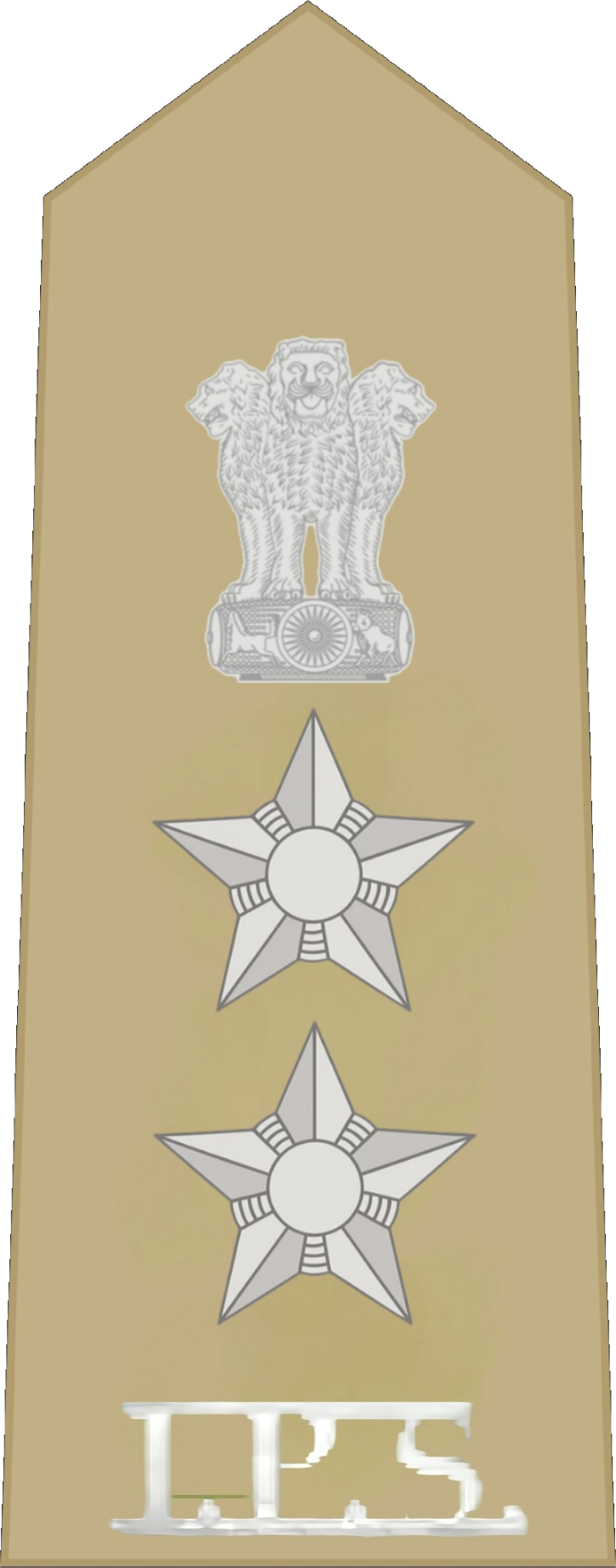
- Rank: Deputy Commissioner of Police (DCP)

Vappala Balachandran is an Indian intelligence officer. He worked as a police officer in Maharashtra in the 1960s and early 70s, and subsequently for the Cabinet Secretariat of the Government of India, where he was appointed as the Special Secretary in the Research & Analysis Wing (R&AW).

He is the author of three books, two on national security and one on the life of A.C.N. Nambiar. Balachandran has also written newspaper columns on security and strategic subjects in Indian and foreign publications.

== Early life & education ==
Balachandran was born in Burma on 15 June 1937, where his father was employed in the Telegraph Department. Originally hailing from the state of Kerala in Southern India, his family relocated back to India in 1940. His father, K. P. Kutti Krishna Menon, served as an officer in the Myanmar government and resided in Yangon until 1940; during World War II, he remained in Myanmar in service of the government. Balachandran is the grand nephew of V.P. Menon from Ottapalam, Kerala.

== Career ==
From 1961 to 1965, Balachandran was an Assistant Superintendent of Police in Nashik in northern Maharashtra. Between 1965 and 1972 he was Superintendent of Police, first in Sangli district and then in Yavatmal district. He was appointed Deputy Commissioner of Police (DCP) in Bombay (present-day Mumbai) in 1972.

In 1976 he started working for the Cabinet Secretariat in New Delhi as an Analysist. He retired in 1995 after serving in the R&AW as a Special Secretary.

Between 2007 and 2009 he wrote several papers for the Henry L. Stimson Center, Washington, D.C. for their "Regional Voices" project. His paper "Insurgency, terrorism, and transnational trends" was included as Chapter 6 in their publication Transnational Trends.

Balachandran along with R. D. Pradhan was a member of the two-man "High Level Committee" appointed by the Government of Maharashtra to inquire into the police response during the Mumbai 26 November 2008 terror attacks. This committee gave scathing remarks about systemic degeneration of security establishments such as A.T.S. Maharashtra.

In November 2009 he was invited by the Governor of Hawaii to be the keynote speaker at the 2009 Asia Pacific Homeland Security Summit at Honolulu and address senior police officials in Singapore on urban security and terrorism. Balachandran spoke at the Pluscarden Programme conference on "The Future of International Cooperation in Countering Violent Extremism" at St Antony's College, Oxford University in October 2010 and in 2013 on "India's Politics of Free Expression-A Law & Order perspective" under the "Marchioness of Winchester Lectures 2013". The interview was aired by the BBC radio along with three other participants.

Vappala Balachandran is also an active columnist who writes for The Sunday Guardian and The Asian Age newspapers.

=== Awards ===
In 1975, Balachandran was awarded the Indian Police Medal for meritorious service and in 1986, The President's Police medal for meritorious service.

== Books ==
- National Security and Intelligence Management-A New Paradigm (2014)
- A life in Shadow (2017)
- Keeping India Safe: The Dilemma of Internal Security (2017)
