= Open Secrets: India's Intelligence Unveiled =

2005 memoir by Maloy Krishna Dhar

Open Secrets: India’s Intelligence Unveiled
- Author: Maloy Krishna Dhar
- Language: English
- Publisher: Manas Publications
- Publication date: 2005
- Publication place: India
- Pages: 552
- ISBN: 978-81-7049-216-0
- OCLC: 1117498341

Open Secrets: India's Intelligence Unveiled is a 2005 personal memoir by Indian intelligence operative Maloy Krishna Dhar. (Note: He gained notoriety in the case of the ‘spy case’ of the ISRO scientist Nambi Narayanan. Maloy Krishna Dhar was born on 13 July 1939 in Mymensingh, East Bengal. His family migrated to West Bengal during Partition. He joined the Indian Police Service in 1964 and spent nearly three decades in the Intelligence Bureau.) The central theme throughout the book is that of the need for legislative oversight and checks for intelligence agencies in India. Dhar, a former Intelligence Bureau of India joint director, provides a top down view of the intelligence establishment in India and the types of pressures that it has to face in carrying out its duties including those of how the agencies are used for 'personal-political agendas'. As a historical memoir, it was as of 2015, the only information available of the Intelligence Bureau that was in the public domain. Dhar wrote this in a time when writing about the intelligence community was frowned upon to the extent of being an act of betrayal. The book remained a number one non-fiction best seller for months after its publication and stirred many a national debate.

== Description ==
In the prologue of the book Dhar writes that he is going to narrate a few instances of illegal activities he had taken part in, under orders, as part of his role. He says that any involved intelligence officer is like a "prostitute", operating in the "breeding ground of Goerings and Himmlers in the backyard of constitutional democracy". Dhar writes how IB and R&AW are used by the political class; and alternatively, a weak Prime Minister and Home Minister end up being used by the agencies. He gives an example of how assets of RA&W such as ARC aircraft are used by politicians and their families for private use. Dhar explains how numerous intelligence agencies in India carry out the dirty work, including the victimization of innocent people. He says this is not unique to India, but goes to the central theme of his book, that in "free democracies" there are legislative checks. Dhar emphasizes the lack of accountability in general for the entire system - politicians, bureaucrats and the intelligence. Dhar talks about a "turf war" between the CBI and IB to the extent that "the Director IB was not on talking terms with the director CBI and he even avoided meeting the special secretary and secretary of the home ministry. I was forced to keep the frayed dialogue line open."

The book talks about the Atal Bihari Vajpayee - L K Advani tussle and the division of labour in the demolition of the Babri Masjid in 1992 as well as the Ambani-Nusli Wadia controversy. Dhar writes about how he was assigned to provide "technical coverage" of a meeting of the Sangh Parivar that would be attended by BJP leaders LK Advani, Murli Manohar Joshi and Vijaya Raje Scindia; Rashtriya Swayamsevak Sangh leaders Rajendra Singh, KS Sudarshan and VHP leaders Vinay Katiyar, Uma Bharti among others. Dhar later found out that the recordings all pointed to the "choreographed" Hindutva attack and pralaya nritya (dance of destruction) of the Babri Masjid. He writes about how the Sangh Parivar was "sufficiently infiltrated by the IB".

Dhar goes on to write about how IB helped Indira Gandhi win elections, "I must admit that the entire field machinery of the IB was mobilised to help Indira Congress win the minor but crucial municipal election" He criticises the bureaucracy for the same type of subservience. The ISRO espionage case which started in 1994 was also elaborated on. Dhar also writes about various others instances he considers a "national shame" such as that of how IB, RA&W and JCB were not able to even decode low grade ciphers used by Pakistani rangers and police.

In the book Dhar relates his hatred of Islam and Muslims his enmity being entirely personal, "I would never forgive them for raping Manorama, my childhood companion back in East Pakistan, and uprooting us from our real motherland." But he goes on to write about the training and guidance of IB through which he evolves more nuanced and complicated worldviews of Islam, to the extent that the Babri Masjid incident was written as "A Chapter of National Shame".

== Publication and launch ==
Open Secrets was published in 2005 by Manas Publications. During the book launch Dhar questioned the lack of accountability of the IB and compared it to CIA, MI5 and MI6. Dhar stated that if there was no legislated accountability then India could turn into a state worse than Idi Amin's Uganda, where the intelligence agencies were used with no checks. In the book he notes this, saying that there is no lack of evidence to prove the same. The book was released by former Jammu and Kashmir Chief Minister Farooq Abdullah.

== Reception ==
The book received immense media coverage and resulted in debate for claims such as the IB telephone tapping of the Prime Minister's office, the toppling of three state governments, bribing MLAs; of corruption in high places, arrests on false grounds, black sheep in the media and rigged referendums and elections.

Indian historian and legal scholar A. G. Noorani writes that the hypocrisy of Dhar in the book is "revolting" but that "the book deserves to be read for its disclosures of skulduggery". Noorani writes that "a good many exposes of the CIA, the FBI and the MI5 and MI6 have been published. None of them, however, was written in the manner Dhar writes. None of the intelligence operators was as vainglorious as he is."

The CIA Intelligence Officer's Bookshelf compiled and reviewed by curator Hayden B. Peake lists Open Secrets as one of "a series of memoirs by retired senior Indian intelligence officers (which have) provided top-down views of intelligence careers in India". Studies in Intelligence writes in their review that the book provides a unique look into India's intelligence services and is "a valuable contribution and background for the intelligence officer".

K.P.S. Gill, twice head of police in Punjab, writes that Maloy's Open Secrets "the book would make an interesting read even for other 'insiders' to intelligence, politics and governance in India, and would probably be entirely fascinating to the lay reader." K.P.S. Gill writes that an editor should have gone through the book before publication.

== Bibliography ==
- Dhar, Maloy Krishna (2005). Open Secrets: India's Intelligence Unveiled. Manas Publications. ISBN 978-81-7049-216-0.
