= B. Raman =

Indian academic and spymaster

Bahukutumbi Raman
- Born: 14 August 1936
- Died: 16 June 2013 (aged 76)
- Education: Loyola College, Chennai
- Espionage activity
- Allegiance: India
- Service branch: R&AW
- Service years: 1968-1994

Bahukutumbi Raman (14 August 1936 – 16 June 2013), also referred to as B. Raman, was an Additional Secretary of the Cabinet Secretariat of the Government of India and head of the counter-terrorism division of the Research and Analysis Wing. Until his death in 2013, he was the director of the Institute for Topical Studies, Chennai. B. Raman was also a contributor to the South Asia Analysis Group (SAAG). As a former intelligence official, B. Raman regularly wrote about security, counter-terrorism and military issues regarding India and South Asia. He was considered one of India's foremost security experts.

== Career ==
B.Raman was born in Tamil Nadu and studied at the prestigious Loyola college in Chennai. He followed it up with a course in Journalism. Later he worked as a Journalist with the Indian Express in Chennai for 4 years. Later he cleared the civil services exam and was inducted as an IPS officer. Raman was an IPS officer of the 1961 batch who served for a time in the Madhya Pradesh cadre before deputation to the Intelligence Bureau in New Delhi. There, he was soon noticed by India's spymaster, R.N. Kao, who took him to the Research and Analysis Wing (R&AW) when it was formed in 1968. From very early on in his career, Raman displayed an unwavering commitment to his work. This, along with his vast knowledge and the ability to recall details of events even after the passage of decades made him a near ideal intelligence officer. These rare qualities prompted Kao and many of his successors to entrust Raman with some of the very sensitive tasks that the R&AW undertook.

It is said that on the suggestion of R.N. Kao, Raman was posted by R&AW in Paris under the guise of an Indian correspondent working for The Hindu. There he is credited for having established a back channel with Ayotollah Ali Khamenei and the leadership of the Islamic revolution that overthrew the Shah in 1978. He did so, using the assistance of an Iranian student in Paris whose life he had once saved. Having been one of the few surviving officers who were a witness to the creation of R&AW during 1968 by R.N. Kao, his analysis on Pakistan, Bangladesh, Burma and China have been an asset to the intelligence community. Raman was the author of a memoir he wrote of his days in the R&AW titled Kaoboys of R&AW - Down Memory Lane.

== Life and death ==
Raman was a bachelor. He lived alone since 1963 with a domestic assistant, except for a few years spent taking care of his aged mother, Alamelu Ammal.

Raman died in Chennai on 16 June 2013 after a prolonged battle with cancer. He was 77. He is survived by his elder brother, Bahukutumbi Srinivasa Raghavan and two elder sisters, B. Shakuntala and Prof. B. Rajalakshmi, as well as Shakuntala's daughters, Prof. Rama G. and Dr. Mira G.

== Publications ==
- Raman, B. (2002). Intelligence: Past, Present & Future. Lancer Publishers. ISBN 9788170622222
- Raman, B (2002). A Terrorist State as a Frontline Ally. Lancer Publishers & Distributors. ISBN 9788170622239
- Raman, B (2007). The Kaoboys of R&AW: Down Memory Lane. Casemate Pub & Book Dist Llc. ISBN 9780979617430
