= Research & Analysis Wing =

Indian external intelligence agency

Research & Analysis Wing (R&AW)
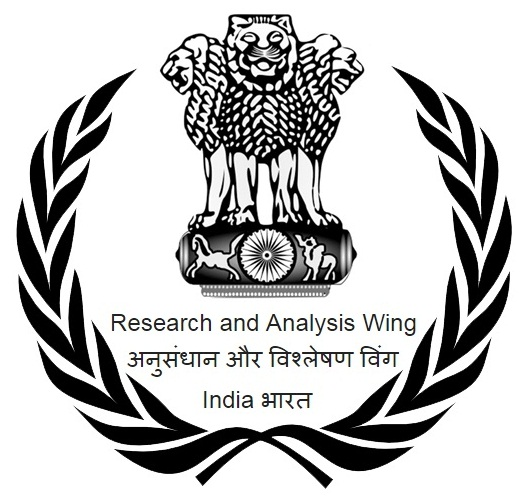
- emblem of agency

- Emblem of the Government of India

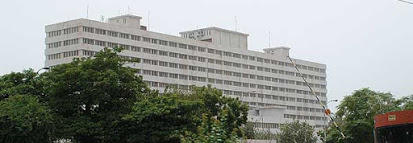
- R&AW's headquarters at Lodhi Road, New Delhi.

Intelligence agency overview
- Formed: 21 September 1968; 58 years ago
- Preceding Intelligence agency: Intelligence Bureau
- Type: Foreign intelligence service
- Jurisdiction: Government of India
- Headquarters: New Delhi, India
- Motto: (Sanskrit: धर्मो रक्षति रक्षितः) (Note: Widely cited as its motto, although no reliable official source has been identified confirming its formal adoption); Dharmō Rakṣati Rakṣitaḥ transl. "The Dharma protects its protector"
- Employees: Classified
- Annual budget: Classified
- Minister responsible: Narendra Modi, Prime Minister of India
- Intelligence agency executive: Parag Jain, IPS, Secretary (Research)
- Parent department: Cabinet Secretariat
- Child Intelligence agency: Electronics and Technical Services (ETS) Aviation Research Centre (ARC) Radio Research Centre (RRC) Special Group (SG) Special Frontier Force (SFF)

The Research & Analysis Wing (R&AW) is the foreign intelligence agency of the Government of India. It is responsible for the collection, processing and assessment of intelligence outside India's borders deemed vital for the advancement of the country's national security interests. A key member of the Indian Intelligence Community, R&AW's mandate includes surveillance of foreign politico-military developments that directly affect India's foreign policy, counterproliferation and counterterrorism.

Administratively, R&AW is not an agency in essence, but rather functions as a wing of the Cabinet Secretariat, albeit with autonomy from bureaucratic control. Its chief officer – designated as Secretary (Research), works under the Cabinet Secretary and cooperates with the National Security Advisor to report to the Prime Minister on all intelligence-related concerns.

Functionally, R&AW manages its own specialized service cadre – the Research and Analysis Service (RAS), although its core leadership is generally drawn from the Indian Police Service (IPS). Unlike other international contemporaries, R&AW is a creation of executive order, which has allowed it to operate without answerability to Parliament. Despite lacking a codified charter, R&AW's norms of conduct are drawn from the Intelligence Organisations (Restriction of Rights) Act, 1985.

Historically, little verifiable information exists about R&AW's functioning; nevertheless, some of its known operations include espionage during the Indo-Pakistani conflict of 1971, assisting in the annexation of Sikkim in 1975, and reconnaissance of Pakistan's nuclear programme in the 1980s.

Presently, R&AW's current Secretary (Research) is Parag Jain, who took office on 1 July 2025.

== Objectives ==
Formally, R&AW does not have a written charter or legally-established statute that defines its responsibilies, but as the agency principally responsible for external intelligence collection, its mandate is understood to have the following:

- Surveillance: To monitor the political and military developments in adjoining countries, which have direct bearing on India's national security and in the formulation of its foreign policy.
- Counterproliferation: To seek the control and limitation of the supply of military assets to India's regional adversary i.e., Pakistan, from suppliers including Europe, the United States, and China.
- Counterterrorism: To eliminate terrorist entities that pose a direct threat to sovereignty and security of India.
- Collection: To conduct intelligence collection about foreign threats deemed averse to India's long-term national security interests, and to suppress them through covert action.
- Cooperation: To cooperate with other nodes of the Indian intelligence apparatus, including the Intelligence Bureau (IB) and the National Technical Research Organisation (NTRO) to establish an integrated intelligence network and to advise the National Security Council about intelligence-related concerns.

== Organizational structure ==
=== Secretary (Research) ===
As R&AW functions as an arm of the Cabinet Secretariat, its chief officer – designated as Secretary (Research), works in the Cabinet Secretariat. By placement of position, the Secretary (Research) is understood to have the undermentioned details:

- Works under the Cabinet Secretary while cooperating with the National Security Advisor to report-cum-advise the Prime Minister on all intelligence-related concerns and affairs.
- Exercises sweeping powers over R&AW's functioning, except regarding administrative and financial matters – which is the remit of the Cabinet Secretary.
- Is a member of the Strategic Policy Group under the National Security Council Secretariat, tasked with advising policymakers on long-term strategic reviews and national security decision-making.

At the time of R&AW's inception in 1968, the Indira Gandhi-led government had designated the position of Secretary (Research) on par with other secretaries, such as the Home Secretary and the Foreign Secretary. However, that status was degraded and redesignated as Director, R&AW – by the Morarji Desai-led government in 1977; nevertheless, the pre-1977 designation was reinstated by the Rajiv Gandhi-led government in 1986.

The Secretary (Research) is appointed by the Prime Minister vis-à-vis the Appointments Committee of the Cabinet for an initial period of two years, with extensions permissible if the service of the officeholder is deemed fit for such extension. The longest serving chief was R. N. Kao, who held the office from R&AW's inception in 1968 up to his retirement in 1977.

Although R&AW has its own specialized service cadre – the Research and Analysis Service (RAS), most of the organization's chiefs have been drawn from the Indian Police Service (IPS) – a practice which has often been criticized. To date, N. F. Suntook and Vikram Sood are the only non-IPS officers to have ever led R&AW.

=== Aviation Research Centre ===
The Aviation Research Centre (ARC) was established in 1963 for aerial reconnaissance after R. N. Kao persuaded the Government of India to create a dedicated airborne intelligence capability. It was later made permanent in 1971. ARC superseded the Indian Air Force's earlier reconnaissance aircraft and by the mid-1970s was producing high-quality aerial imagery of installations along the Line of Actual Control and the India–Pakistan border.

=== Electronics and Technical Services ===
The Electronics and Technical Services (ETS) unit was added to R&AW as the agency expanded its technical intelligence (TECHINT) capabilities during the late twentieth century. ETS provides technical support including electronic surveillance (ELINT), communications monitoring (COMINT), and specialized equipment used in intelligence gathering operations.

=== Radio Research Center ===
The Radio Research Center (RRC) was established as part of the agency’s growing signals intelligence (SIGINT) and communications monitoring capability. It works alongside other technical units to intercept and analyze radio and communication signals relevant to national security operations.

=== Special Frontier Force ===
The Special Frontier Force (SFF) is an Indian special forces unit composed primarily of Tibetan refugees and Gurkhas in India. It was established after the Sino-Indian War of 1962 to primarily conduct covert operations behind the Line of Actual Control in case of another war with China. Based in Chakrata, Uttarakhand, the force was put under the direct supervision of the Intelligence Bureau (IB), and later the Research and Analysis Wing (R&AW), India's external intelligence agency, and is not part of the Indian Army but functions under their operational control with its own rank structure, charter and training infrastructure.

=== Special Group ===
The Special Group (SG) is a covert special clandestine operation unit operating under the Research and Analysis Wing (R&AW). It was formed in the early 1980s to conduct sensitive missions such as counter-terrorism, special reconnaissance, and covert operations. The unit is believed to be composed largely of personnel drawn from the Parachute Regiment of the Indian Army. Due to the classified nature of its activities, most details about its structure and operations remain undisclosed.

=== Directorate General of Security ===
The Directorate General of Security (DGS) is an organisation under the Research and Analysis Wing responsible for supervising several specialized security and covert units. It oversees agencies such as the Special Frontier Force and the Aviation Research Centre. The directorate coordinates sensitive operations and provides administrative control for these units. Due to the classified nature of its work, many operational details remain undisclosed.

=== Rank Structure of Officers & Employees ===
Given R&AW's secretive nature, there is little verifiable knowledge regarding the true orientation of its administrative structure. Unlike other intelligence agencies like the IB or NIA, R&AW was created not as an agency per se, but rather a wing, or arm of the Cabinet Secretariat – designed to mask any undue attention.

The R&AW is patterned on the lines of the Indian Foreign Service (IFS) in terms of rank structure, promotions, pay and allowances in India and abroad.

Ranks, designations, and positions held by Research & Analysis Service (RAS) officers in their career
Grade/Scale (Level on Pay Matrix)	Posting at Embassies / High Commissions / Permanent Missions / Consulates	Posting at Special Bureaus	Posting at the R&AW Headquarter	Pay Scale (Basic Pay)
Administrative Head (Pay level 17)	—	—	Secretary (Research)	₹225,000 (US$2,400)
Apex scale (Pay level 17)	— (Note: (often filled by the IFS officers))	—	Special Secretary	₹225,000 (US$2,400)
Higher Administrative Grade (Pay level 15)	—	Additional Secretary		₹182,200 (US$1,900)—₹224,100 (US$2,400)
Senior Administrative Grade (Pay level 14)	Ambassador/ High Commissioner/ Minister / DCM / Consul General	Commissioner	Joint Secretary	₹144,200 (US$1,500)—₹218,200 (US$2,300)
Selection Grade (Pay level 13)	Counsellor / Deputy Consul General	Additional Commissioner	Director	₹123,100 (US$1,300)—₹215,900 (US$2,300)
Junior Administrative Grade (Pay level 12)	First Secretary / Consul	Deputy Commissioner	Deputy Secretary	₹78,800 (US$840)—₹209,200 (US$2,200)
Senior Time Scale (Pay level 11)	Second Secretary / Consul	Assistant Commissioner	Under Secretary	₹67,700 (US$720)—₹208,700 (US$2,200)
Group A Junior Time Scale (Pay level 10)	Third Secretary / Vice Consul	Senior Field Officer	Assistant Secretary	₹56,100 (US$600)—₹177,500 (US$1,900)
Group B (Pay level 8)	Attache / Vice Consul	Field Officer	Section Officer	₹47,600 (US$510)—₹151,100 (US$1,600)
Group B (Pay level 7)	— (Note: (often filled by the MEA staffs))	Deputy Field Officer	Assistant Section Officer	₹44,900 (US$480)—₹142,400 (US$1,500)
Group C (Pay level 5)	—	Assistant Field Officer	Assistant	₹29,200 (US$310)—₹92,300 (US$990)
Group C (Pay level 4)	—	Senior Field Assistant	Upper division clerk	₹25,500 (US$270)—₹81,100 (US$870)
Group C (Pay level 3)	—	Field Assistant	UDC / LDC	₹21,700 (US$230)—₹69,100 (US$740)
Group C (Pay level 2)	—	Lower Division Clerk		₹19,900 (US$210)—₹63,200 (US$680)
Group C (Pay level 1)	—	Multi-Tasking Staff		₹18,000 (US$190)—₹56,900 (US$610)

Note: In addition to their basic pay, R&AW officers are entitled to a Special Security Allowance, amounting to approximately 20% of the basic pay and other allowances like DA, TA and HRA, while posted within India. When assigned to postings abroad, they receive a Foreign Allowance in addition to their basic pay.

=== Field formations ===
R&AW has 10 field formations all over India, known as Special Bureaus. These Bureaus have an area of responsibility targeted towards the countries that share land border with India. They are largely located in major cities near or along the borders:

Zonal Structure and Equivalent Ranks
Zone	Headquarters	Rank of Zonal Head	Equivalent Rank in R&AW
Northern Zone	Jammu	Additional Secretary	Additional Secretary
Eastern Zone	Kolkata	Commissioner	Joint Secretary
South-Western Zone	Mumbai	Commissioner	Joint Secretary
North-Eastern Zone	Shillong	Commissioner	Joint Secretary
Southern Zone	Chennai	Additional Commissioner	Director
Central Zone	Lucknow	Additional Commissioner	Director
Western Central Zone	Bhopal	Deputy Commissioner	Deputy Secretary
Western Zone	Jodhpur	Deputy Commissioner	Deputy Secretary

=== Stations abroad ===
R&AW has been active in obtaining information and operating through third countries. R&AW offices abroad have limited strength and are largely geared to the collection of military, economic, scientific, and political intelligence. R&AW monitors the activities of certain organisations abroad only insofar as they relate to their involvement with narco terrorist elements and smuggling arms, ammunition, explosives, etc. into India. It does not monitor the activities of criminal elements abroad, which are mainly confined to normal smuggling without any links to terrorist elements.

R&AW officers are posted to Indian diplomatic missions under official cover as diplomats, frequently in the consular wing. The relationship between R&AW and the MEA has historically been characterized by both cooperation & tension and there is a very thin line between the R&AW and the MEA as both organizations work on the matter of Indian Foreign Policy and National Security, according to The Times of India.

A task force report prepared by a New Delhi-based security think tank highlighted that R&AW operatives have inadequate number of non-official cover for overseas operations which 'limits access to spot real targets' and causes issues on handling 'high-value assets'.

== Recruitment ==
=== Historical Way of recruitment ===
Initially, R&AW relied primarily on trained intelligence officers who were recruited directly. These belonged to the external wing of the Intelligence Bureau. Candidates are mostly recruited from the IPS and few other civil services along with candidates from armed forces of India, the latter being in lesser number though. Later, it began directly recruiting graduates from universities. However owing to allegations of nepotism in appointments, in 1983 R&AW created its own service cadre, the Research and Analysis Service (RAS), to absorb talent from other Group A Civil Services, under the Central Staffing Scheme.

=== Current Scenario ===
There is no direct recruitment in the Research and Analysis Wing (R&AW). Individuals who wish to join R&AW must first qualify through one of the following competitive examinations to become academically eligible for Group A and Group B posts: UPSC CSE, UPSC ESE, GATE, exams conducted by the Regulators, UPSC IES, UPSC ISS, exams conducted by other intelligence agencies, SSB Interview, CAPF Examination and SSC CGL etc. After successfully clearing any of the aforementioned examinations, officers are required to join the corresponding All India Services or Central Civil Services or in any organisation or department or ministry. Following a period of approximately four to five years, their Annual Confidential Reports (ACRs), Annual Performance Reports, extensive background checks and characters are reviewed by the Research and Analysis Wing (R&AW). Based on this assessment, R&AW initiates the enrollment process for eligible officers into its specific organizational divisions. Then the candidates are required to undergo a separate selection process conducted by R&AW, which includes multiple specialized test, multiple rounds of physical fitness tests and multiple rounds of interview for checking emotional intelligence level. After selection, first they will get a temporary four year of deputation in the R&AW. Another extension of four more years will be considered by the Secretary (R). Then after serving of nearly 7 years in deputation, a committee (consisting of Cabinet Secretary, Secretary (R), Director (IB), Home Secretary, Secretary (Personnel)) will decide the permanent secondment of the concerned officer into the Research and Analysis Service (RAS) cadre, before one year of the expiry of tenure of deputation, after reviewing their performance and will of serving.

Delhi-based security think tank Institute for Defence Studies and Analyses noted in one of its reports that R&AW suffered from the 'tail-end syndrome' where the 'bottom of the entrance lists' of those qualifying the UPSC examinations were offered jobs. Additionally, recruitment is also by lateral deputation from the Officer corps of Armed Forces or Group A Civil Service Officers. The Civil and Defence Service Officers permanently resign their cadre and join the RAS. However, according to recent reports, officers can return to their parent cadre after serving a specific period in the agency if they wish to.

Most of the secretaries have been officers from the IPS, IRS and IFS officers. R&AW also employs a number of linguists and other experts in various fields. The service conditions of R&AW officers are governed by the Research and Analysis Wing (Recruitment, Cadre and Service) Rules, 1975.

=== Difference between Officer and Agent ===
A common misconception exists that an agent (Spy) and an officer (Spymaster) are the same. This is not the case. Officers of the Research and Analysis Wing (R&AW) are formally appointed members of the Government of India, whereas agents are not enlisted or employed directly by the government. Recruitment is conducted exclusively for officers; agents are never formally inducted into government service.

Furthermore, when an R&AW officer is posted to a foreign embassy or assignment, they are provided official cover and the protections of diplomatic immunity. Agents, however, do not receive such privileges. If an officer’s activities are discovered, they may be declared a persona non grata; in contrast, an agent apprehended while conducting espionage may face prosecution and, in extreme cases, capital punishment.

== Training ==
=== Basic Training ===
Basic training consists of motivational talks and an introduction to the 'real' world of intelligence and espionage, as opposed to fiction. Common usages, tradecraft techniques and classification of information are taught. Case studies of other intelligence agencies are presented for study. The inductee is also taught the role of the country's foreign policy in the field. The recruit is made to specialise in a foreign language. Basic classroom training is imparted at the residential Training and Language Institute in Gurgaon. A multi-disciplinary school of economic intelligence is also being set up in Mumbai to train intelligence officers in investigating economic crimes like money laundering for terror purposes. They are also sent to top-tier institutions such as Jawaharlal Nehru University.

=== Field Training ===
After completing basic training the recruit is given field training. They learn the art of reconnaissance, making contacts, and the numerous skills of operating an intelligence mission. During night exercises they are taught infiltration and exfiltration. They are instructed to avoid capture and if caught, how to face interrogation. At the end of the field training, the recruit is brought back to school. Before deployment in the field, they are given exhaustive training in self-defence and the use of technical espionage devices. Field and arms training is provided by the Indian Military Academy (IMA) and the Central Armed Police Forces (CAPF). Commando and explosives training are given to all recruits. They are also drilled in various administrative disciplines so that they could take their place in foreign missions without arousing suspicion.

Training lasts for four years. It aims to make the inductees ready to set up their own network of informers, moles or operatives, or operate under the cover of an Embassy to gather information, as the task may require. In the past, the training model has been criticised as being 'archaic and too police-centric and not incorporating 'modern technological advances in methods of communication'.

=== Advanced Training ===
Even after completing the field training, certain candidates who have performed exceptionally well during both Basic and Field training may be sent to friendly foreign countries for advanced espionage training and operational experience. For example, the former Chief of R&AW, C. D. Sahay, was sent to Israel for specialized training.

== In public view ==
=== Oversight ===
Formally, R&AW does not have a written statute, rather, it is a creation of executive order, which has allowed the agency to operate without answerability to Parliament. This nature is also shared by the Intelligence Bureau (IB), which also has its origin in executive order, and thus also lacks a written statute. Technically, it means both agencies exist and function without legal legitimacy or parliamentary authorization.

Calls for accountability for India's intelligence apparatus were made in the aftermath of The Emergency of 1975–77, when institutional abuses under the then-Indira Gandhi government were widespread. In 1978, then-prime minister Morarji Desai appointed a committee headed by former Home Secretary L. P. Singh to investigate the functioning and misuse of the Central Bureau of Investigation (CBI) and the IB for political ends; it subsequently recommended the creation of “a comprehensive central legislation to remove the deficiency of not having a central investigative agency with a self-sufficient statutory charter of duties and functions”. However, Gandhi's return to power in 1980 prevented the implementation of the recommendations. In 2010, then-vice president of India Hamid Ansari highlighted the need for R&AW to have accountability under parliamentary oversight to prevent any potential misuse of power. In 2011, 2019 and 2024 Congress MP Manish Tewari attempted to introduce private member's bill to initiate oversight, called The Intelligence Services (Powers And Regulation) Bill; however, none of his attempts succeeded. His 2011 attempt to pass the bill was criticized by former R&AW chiefs C. D. Sahay and Anand Verma as being too micromangerial towards R&AW operations; the bill was never passed.

Nevertheless, there have been some arguments in support of no oversight; it has been opined that a foreign intelligence agency does not operate within a permissible area – while they may be working in the interests of one's own country, they are certainly not operating in the interest of the host country, and are thus not liable to legal accountability. Another argument in favor is that in multi-party systems or coalition politics, the efficient functioning of the agency may be hindered due to political interference, thus necessitating a nature of functioning independent from oversight.

=== Scrutiny ===
Since its inception in 1968, R&AW has maintained a rigorously secretive existence, with little information available about it in the public domain about its operational activities.

Provisionally, the vast majority of India's intelligence apparatus – including R&AW, are listed in the Second Schedule of the Right to Information Act, 2005, which in conjunction of Section 24 of the Act, is exempted from the public disclosure of sensitive information, unless the information that is requested pertains to allegations of corruption and human rights violations. However, the information related to such allegations may also be withheld, if it is found to be in contravention to Section 8 of the Act, which specifies that "information, disclosure of which would prejudicially affect the sovereignty and integrity of India, the security, strategic, scientific or economic interests of the State".

== History ==
=== Background (1923–69) ===
Prior to the inception of the Research and Analysis Wing, overseas intelligence collection was primarily the responsibility of the Intelligence Bureau (IB), which was created by the Government of India during British Raj in 1887. In 1933, sensing the political turmoil in the world which eventually led to the Second World War, the Intelligence Bureau's responsibilities were increased to include the collection of intelligence along India's borders.

In 1947, after independence, Sanjeevi Pillai took over as the first Indian Director of the IB. B. N. Mullik took over in 1950 until 1965. Having been depleted of trained manpower by the exit of the British after Indian independence, Pillai tried to run the bureau on MI5 lines. In 1949, Pillai organised a small foreign intelligence set-up, but the Indian debacle in the Sino-Indian War of 1962 showed it to be ineffective. The Directorate General of Security was created as a result.After the Indo-Pakistani war of 1965, the Chief of Army Staff, General Joyanto Nath Chaudhuri, also called for more intelligence-gathering. The Mizo revolt in 1966 also acted as a reason for the changes in the external intelligence structure. Around the end of 1966 the concept of a separate foreign intelligence agency began to take concrete shape.

=== Formation of R&AW in 1968 to present ===
There is no official source in the public domain for the reasoning behind the creation of R&AW.

In 1968 the Indira Gandhi administration decided that a full-fledged second security service was needed. RN Kao, then a deputy director of the Intelligence Bureau, and head of IB's External Wing, submitted a blueprint for the new agency. Kao was appointed as the chief of India's first foreign intelligence agency, the Research and Analysis Wing. Frontmen included Sankaran Nair, MBK Nair, IS Hassanwalia and PN Banerjee. The R&AW was given the responsibility for strategic external intelligence, human as well as technical, plus concurrent responsibility with the Directorate-General of Military Intelligence for tactical trans-border military intelligence up to a certain depth across the Line of control (LOC) and the international border.

From its inception R&AW has been criticised for being an agency not answerable to the people of India (R&AW reports to Prime Minister only). Fears arose that it could turn into the KGB of India. Such fears were kept at bay by the R&AW's able leadership (although detractors of R&AW and especially the Janata Party have accused the agency of letting itself be used for terrorising and intimidating opposition during the 1975–1977 Emergency). The main controversy which has plagued R&AW in recent years is over bureaucratisation of the system with allegations about favouritism in promotions, corruption, ego clashes, no financial accountability, and inter-departmental rivalry. Noted security analyst and former Additional Secretary B. Raman has criticised the agency for its asymmetric growth;"while being strong in its capability for covert action it is weak in its capability for intelligence collection, analysis and assessment. Strong in low and medium-grade intelligence, weak in high-grade intelligence. Strong in technical intelligence, weak in human intelligence.Strong in collation, weak in analysis. Strong in investigation, weak in prevention. Strong in crisis management, weak in crisis prevention."

R&AW started as a wing of the Intelligence Bureau with 250 employees and an annual budget of ₹2 crore. In the early seventies, its annual budget had risen to ₹30 crore while its personnel numbered several thousand. By 2000, the think tank FAS estimated the budget was Rs.1500 crore ($145 million). Other 2002–03 estimates place the budget from as high as US$150 million to as low as US$31 million.

== International Operations ==
The known activities and international operations of R&AW, by country:

=== Africa ===
==== South Africa and Namibia ====
R&AW trained the intelligence officers of many independent African countries and assisted the anti-apartheid struggles in South Africa and Namibia. Retired R&AW officers were deputed to work in training institutes of intelligence agencies of some African states.

==== Senegal ====
R&AW was one of the primary agencies that provided the information about Ravi Pujari being located in Senegal. This information was provided to Senegalese authorities, who arrested Pujari and deported him to India. He was formally arrested at Kempegowda International Airport by Karnataka Police.

=== Asia ===
==== Afghanistan ====
During the Soviet War in Afghanistan, R&AW had recruited three powerful warlords, including Ahmad Shah Massoud.

In 1996, R&AW had built a 25-bed military hospital at the Farkhor Air Base. (Note: The Northern Alliance military commander, Ahmad Shah Massoud, who was assassinated in September 2001 by two Arab suicide bombers posing as journalists, died in the India-run hospital.) This airbase was used by the Aviation Research Centre, the reconnaissance arm of R&AW, to repair and operate the Northern Alliance's aerial support. This relationship was further cemented in the 2001 Afghan war.

After the September 11, 2001 attacks, R&AW provided the intelligence to western countries that there were over 120 training camps operating in Afghanistan and Pakistan, run by a variety of militant groups.

After the overthrow of Taliban in Afghanistan in 2001, R&AW was the first intelligence agency to determine the extent of the Kunduz airlift.

In 2017, R&AW undertook a counter-terrorism operation, described as "unprecedented in its scale and scope", foiling a major terrorist attack by an Islamic State – Khorasan suicide bomber in New Delhi. The CIA was also involved in this operation. The militant was later transferred to a US base in Afghanistan for further questioning. The operation spanned 3 countries and involved 80 Research officers.

In November–December 2019, a special exfiltration operation was undertaken by R&AW. At least four Indian nationals working in various parts of Afghanistan, that had been abducted by the Haqqani network, were successfully rescued.

In 2020, 10 MSS operatives from Xinjiang State Security Department (XSSD) were arrested in Kabul by the Afghan NDS. During questioning, one of the operatives told the interrogators that they were gathering information about al-Qaeda, Taliban and Turkistan Islamic Party in Kunar and Badakhshan provinces, and wanted to assassinate high-level members of TIP. This counter-intelligence operation was undertaken based on a tip from R&AW.

==== Bangladesh ====
In the early 1970s, the army of Pakistan launched military crackdown in response to the Bangladesh independence movement. Nearly 1 crore (10 million) refugees fled to India. R&AW was instrumental in the formation of the Bangladeshi guerrilla organisation Mukti Bahini and responsible for supplying information, providing training and heavy ammunition to this organisation. Special Frontier Force, then under R&AW, actively participated in military operations especially in the Chittagong Hill Tracts. After the war ended in the successful creation of Bangladesh, four years later Sheikh Mujibur Rahman was assassinated on 15 August 1975 at his residence. R&AW operatives claimed that they had advance information about Mujibur Rahman's assassination but Sheikh Mujib tragically ignored inputs. He was killed along with much of his family. Later, R&AW successfully thwarted plans of assassinating Sheikh Hasina Wazed, daughter of Mujibur Rahman, by Islamist extremists.

In 1990, R&AW helped engineer and support a democratic uprising against Mohammed Ershad, thus leading to his resignation. His pro-Pakistan and anti-Hindu policy decisions had been considered a threat by Indian government.

In 1991, after Khaleda Zia won an election, India was alarmed over increased harassment of pro-India politicians, large-scale radicalisation and meticulously planned infiltration of trained extremists into Indian territory by Jamaat-e-Islami. JeI had set-up several terror training camps located along the border. In order to stop this activity, R&AW spontaneously bombed several of its camps and a major ISI safe house, thus dismantling JeI's terror network.

In 1977–97, India took active part in Chittagong Hill Tracts conflict. R&AW trained and financed the rebels of Shanti Bahini, the militant wing of the PCJSS. In 2025, the chief of the PCJSS, Santu Larma, was accused of carrying out human rights violations, child soldier recruitment, arms and narcotics trafficking on behalf of the Government of Bangladesh.

==== China ====
After China tested its first nuclear weapons on 16 October 1964, at Lop Nur, Xinjiang, India and the USA shared a common fear about the nuclear capabilities of China. Owing to the extreme remoteness of Chinese testing grounds, strict secrecy surrounding the Chinese nuclear programme, and the extreme difficulty that an Indian or American would have passing themselves off as Chinese, it was almost impossible to carry out any HUMINT operation. So, the CIA in the late 1960s decided to launch an ELINT operation along with R&AW and ARC to track China's nuclear tests and monitor its missile launches. The operation, in the garb of a mountaineering expedition to Nanda Devi involved Indian climber M S Kohli who along with operatives of Special Frontier Force and the CIA – most notably Jim Rhyne, a veteran STOL pilot – was to place a permanent ELINT device, a transceiver powered by a plutonium battery, that could detect and report data on future nuclear tests carried out by China. The monitoring device was near successfully implanted on Nanda Devi, when an avalanche forced a hasty withdrawal. Later, a subsequent mountain operation to retrieve or replant the device was aborted when it was found that the device was lost. Recent reports indicate that radiation traces from this device have been discovered in sediment below the mountains.

In February 2020, Indian Customs officials detained a Chinese ship from Shanghai Port, at Kandla Port. The ship was bound for Port Qasim in Karachi. It was seized for wrongly declaring an autoclave, which can be used in the launch process of ballistic missiles, as an industrial dryer. This seizure was done on an intelligence tip-off by R&AW.

==== Fiji ====
In Fiji, where Fijians with Indian ancestry were being persecuted by Sitiveni Rabuka, R&AW launched an operation involving informants in Australia, New Zealand and UK to successfully oust him from power.

==== Iran ====
In August 1991, R&AW undertook a physical surveillance and tracking operation of Indian nationals from Jammu and Kashmir that were taking weapons training in Qom.

==== Malaysia ====
Since 2014, R&AW has undertaken numerous identification, physical surveillance and tracking operations in Malaysia targeted towards Khalistani organisations. It is only of because such operations that many high-ranking Khalistani militants like Harminder Singh Mintoo, Tara Singh, Kulbir Kaur, Ramandeep Singh etc. have been arrested and deported to India.

==== Maldives ====
In November 1988, the People's Liberation Organisation of Tamil Eelam (PLOTE), composed of about 200 Tamil secessionist rebels under Abdullah Luthufi, invaded Maldives. At the request of the president of Maldives, Maumoon Abdul Gayoom, the Indian Armed Forces, with assistance from R&AW, launched a military campaign to throw the mercenaries out of Maldives. On the night of 3 November 1988, the Indian Air Force airlifted the 6th parachute battalion of the Parachute Regiment from Agra and flew them over 2,000 km to Maldives. The Indian paratroopers landed at the airstrip of Hulhule island and restored the Government rule at Malé within a day. The operation, labelled Operation Cactus, also involved the Indian Navy. Swift operation by the military and precise intelligence by R&AW quelled the insurgency.

In 2018–19, R&AW undertook many operations that crippled ISI and MSS intelligence network in Maldives.

In December 2024 The Washington Post reported that R&AW tried (but later dropped the plan altogether as relations started to improve between India and Maldives) to oust Maldivian government because Government of India perceived the Maldivian government to be pro-China. After the publication of The Washington Post report the Maldivian Foreign Minister in an interview to WION said (regarding The Washington Post story) "very short answer for that. It is totally, something that is untrue, unfounded. There is no truth in that. So it is as simple as that."

==== Mauritius ====
In February 1983, Mauritian Prime Minister Anerood Jugnauth requested assistance from Indira Gandhi in the event of a coup by rival politician Paul Bérenger. In March 1983, Gandhi ordered the Indian Army and Navy to prepare for a military intervention against a possible coup against the Jugnauth government. But the military intervention was put off by Gandhi, after a squabble between the Indian Navy and Army, on who would lead the operation. Instead, she chose to task the Research and Analysis Wing's then chief, Nowsher F. Suntook, with supervising a largely intelligence-led operation to reunite the Indian community of Mauritius whose fracturing along ideological and communal lines had allowed Berenger to mount a political challenge.

==== Myanmar ====
During the 1990s, R&AW cultivated Burmese rebel groups and pro-democracy coalitions, especially the Kachin Independence Army (KIA). India allowed the KIA to carry a limited trade in jade and precious stones using Indian territory and even supplied them weapons. It is further alleged that KIA chief Maran Brang Seng met the Secretary(R) in Delhi twice. However, when the KIA became the main source of training and weapons for militant groups in Northeast India, R&AW initiated an operation, code named Operation Leech, to assassinate the leaders of the Burmese rebels as an example to other groups. In 1998, six top rebel leaders, including military wing chief of National Unity Party of Arakans (NUPA), Khaing Raza, were shot dead and 34 Arakanese guerrillas were arrested and charged with gunrunning.

In 1995, in Mizoram along the India–Myanmar border, the 57th Mountain Division of the Indian Army carried out the Operation Golden Bird. The operation was launched because R&AW had provided information that a huge consignment of arms had reached to Cox's Bazar (Bangladesh) and was to be sent to insurgents in Manipur. The arms, as per intelligence, were meant for groups in Nagaland and Isak-Muivah group in Manipur. Forces were deployed for counterinsurgency in the states of Manipur and Nagaland. Radio sets and other technological instruments were used to intercept insurgent messages. On 5 April 1995, Indian troops captured an insurgent named Hathi Bsrvah, trained by Pakistani ISI near Karachi. By 21 May 1995, the operation was finally called off.

In 2015, R&AW and Military Intelligence of Indian Army provided the intelligence support to 21 Para (SF), for their counter-insurgency operation in Myanmar.

==== Nepal ====
In 1998, Mirza Dilshad Beg, a Nepalese parliamentarian and an ISI informant was assassinated by R&AW.

Raju Pargai & Amit Arya were shot dead in 2011, who were running Mirza Dilshad Beg's entire network in Uttarakhand. Despite the accusation and arrest of Lucky Bisht, there was not enough evidence to convict him in the murder case, leading to his eventual acquittal.

During 1997–2013, R&AW along with IB carried out multiple operations, in which many militant leaders like Yasin Bhatkal of Indian Mujahideen; Bhupinder Singh Bhuda of Khalistan Commando Force; Tariq Mehmood, Asif Ali, Syed Abdul Karim Tunda, Abu Qasim of Lashkar-e-Taiba; Fayaz Ahmed Mir of Jaish-e-Mohammed were secretly brought to India.

In 2014, R&AW along with DGFI tracked down Indian Mujahideen's top commander, Zia Ur Rehman in Nepal. The operation was executed by DGFI after formal request from India's R&AW and Nepal's law enforcement agencies.

In 2017, it was reported that R&AW had kidnapped a mid-level ISI officer Lt. Col. Mohammed H Zahir from Lumbini. There were reports that Zahir was among the ISI team that had taken part in kidnapping and smuggling of former Indian Navy officer Kulbhushan Jadhav from Chabahar, Iran to Meshkal Pakistan.

In September 2022, Mohammad Lal, who was a huge supplier of counterfeit Indian currency was shot dead by two unidentified armed men in Kathmandu. The assailants immediately fled the scene after shooting Lal. R&AW had been looking for Lal for a long time for his alleged connections with ISI and D-Company.

==== Pakistan ====
During the late 1980s, R&AW had infiltrated the highest levels of Pakistani military and political leadership. It even had a mole inside General Yahya Khan's Office. This mole had also alerted the Indian armed forces, a week before about impending Pakistani air attacks. This alert was correct as Pakistan attacked India on December 3, thus starting the Indo-Pakistani War of 1971.

R&AW's most successful spy was Ravindra Kaushik, who conducted espionage operations in Pakistan in the 1970s. He was from Rajasthan's Sri Ganganagar. Kaushik was a student and an aspiring actor. He was acting in a patriotic play in a theatre in Lucknow, when an R&AW recruiter spotted him. He joined R&AW in 1975 at the age of 23. They trained him, created a disguise identity and sent him to Pakistan. He did an LLB at Karachi university and joined the Pakistani army, where he was eventually promoted to the rank of major. Between 1979–83, he passed valuable information to R&AW. Due to his feats, the then Indian prime minister Indira Gandhi gave him title of "The Black Tiger".

Kahuta is the site of the Khan Research Laboratories, Pakistan's main nuclear weapons laboratory as well as an emerging centre for long-range missile development. The primary Pakistani missile-material production facility is located at Kahuta, employing gas centrifuge enrichment technology to produce Highly Enriched Uranium (HEU). R&AW first confirmed Pakistan's nuclear programs by analysing the hair samples snatched from the floor of barber shops near KRL; which showed that Pakistan had developed the ability to enrich uranium to weapons-grade quality. R&AW operatives knew about Kahuta Research Laboratories from at least early 1978, when the then Indian Prime Minister, Morarji Desai, accidentally exposed R&AW's operations on Pakistan's covert nuclear weapons program. In an indiscreet moment in a telephone conversation one day, Morarji Desai informed the then Pakistan President, Zia-ul-Haq, that India was aware of Pakistan's nuclear weapons program. According to later reports, acting on this "tip-off", Pakistan's ISI and army eliminated most of R&AW's assets in and around Kahuta.

R&AW received information from one of its informants in a London-based company, which had supplied Arctic-weather gear to Indian troops in Ladakh, that some Pakistan paramilitary forces had bought similar Arctic-weather gear. This information was shared with the Indian Army which launched Operation Meghdoot to take control of the Siachen Glacier with around 300 acclimatised troops airlifted to Siachen before Pakistan could launch any operation, resulting in an Indian head start and the eventual Indian domination of all major peaks in Siachen.

In the mid-1980s, R&AW set up two special units, Counterintelligence Team-X(CIT-X) and Counterintelligence Team-J(CIT-J), the first directed at Pakistan and the second at Khalistani groups. Rabinder Singh, the R&AW officer who later defected to the United States in 2004, helped run CIT-J in its early years. Both these covert units used the services of cross-border traffickers to ferry weapons and funds across the border, much as their ISI counterparts were doing. According to former R&AW official and noted security analyst B. Raman, the Indian counter-campaign yielded results. "The role of our cover action capability in putting an end to the ISI's interference and support of khalistani militants in Punjab, thus completely stopping years of violence and insurgency", he wrote in 2002, "by making such interference prohibitively costly is little known and understood." These covert groups were disbanded during the tenure of IK Gujral and were never restarted. As per B Raman a former R&AW Additional Secretary, these covert groups were successful in keeping a check on ISI and were "responsible for ending the Khalistani insurgency".

During the mid-1990s, R&AW undertook an operation to infiltrate various ISI-backed militant groups in Jammu and Kashmir. R&AW operatives infiltrated the area, collected military intelligence, and provided evidence about ISI's involvement in training and funding separatist groups. R&AW was successful not only in unearthing the links, but also in infiltrating and neutralising the terrorism in the Kashmir valley. It is also credited for creating a split in the Hizb-ul-Mujahideen. Operation Chanakya also marked the creation of pro-Indian groups in Kashmir like the Ikhwan-ul-Muslimeen, Muslim Mujahideen etc. These counter-insurgencies consist of ex-militants and relatives of those slain in the conflict. Ikhwan-ul-Muslimeen leader Kokka Parrey was himself assassinated by separatists.

During the Kargil War, R&AW was also successful in intercepting a telephonic conversation between Pervez Musharraf, the then Pakistan Army Chief who was in Beijing and his chief of staff Lt. Gen. Mohammed Aziz in Islamabad. This tape was later published by India to prove Pakistani involvement in the Kargil incursion.

In 2004, it had come to light that a timely tip-off by R&AW helped foil a third assassination plot against Pakistan's former president, General Pervez Musharraf.

About 2–6 months before 26/11 Mumbai attacks, R&AW had intercepted several telephone calls through SIGINT which pointed at impending attacks on Mumbai Hotels by Pakistan-based terrorists, however there was a coordination failure and no follow up action was taken. Few hours before the attacks, a R&AW technician monitoring satellite transmissions picked up conversations between attackers and handlers, as the attackers were sailing toward Mumbai. The technician flagged the conversations as being suspicious and passed them on to his superiors. R&AW believed that they were worrying and immediately alerted the office of the National Security Advisor. However the intelligence was ignored. Later, just after the terrorists had attacked Mumbai, the technicians started monitoring the six phones used by the terrorists and recorded conversations between the terrorists and their handlers.

In March 2016, Kulbhushan Jadhav, an Indian naval officer who working as a R&AW agent, was arrested in Balochistan and charged with espionage and sabotage. He was accused of operating a covert terror network within Balochistan. In 2017, he was sentenced to death by a Field General Court Martial in Pakistan. While held by Pakistani authorities, Jadhav had confessed in a video recording that he was tasked by R&AW, “to plan and organise espionage and sabotage activities” in Balochistan and Karachi.

During the 2016 Line of Control strike, R&AW played an important role by providing real time and accurate intelligence to operational advisors and planners. It had deployed its human assets closest to the 8 demarcated launch-pads in Pakistan administered Kashmir. It also started Physical Surveillance of Chief of Pakistan army, 10 Corps commander and force commander of Northern Areas.

During 2019 Balakot airstrike, R&AW played an important role by identifying and providing intelligence on Markaz Syed Ahmad Shaheed training camp, to operational planners. It had HUMINT that a large number of terrorists had congregated in the camp.

On 1 March 2022, one of the hijackers of Flight IC 814 flight, Zahoor Mistry, was killed by two bike-borne assailants in Karachi. It was Mistry who had killed one of the passengers, 25-year-old Rupin Katyal, on the flight. It is widely believed he was assassinated by R&AW.

On 20 February 2023, Hizbul Commander Bashir Ahmad Peer alias Imtiyaz Alam who was India's most wanted designated terrorist under Unlawful Activities (Prevention) Act was shot dead outside a store by unknown assailants in Rawalpindi. It is widely believed that R&AW was behind this.

On May 6, 2023, Paramjit Singh Panjwar, the Chief of Khalistan Commando Force was gunned down by two unidentified bike-borne gunmen in Johar Town of Lahore while he was out for a morning walk near his residence. Most likely it is believed he was assassinated by R&AW operative.

On April 4, 2024, The Guardian reported that the Indian government had allegedly ordered the killings of individuals in Pakistan. Up to 20 assassinations had taken place since 2020, targeting individuals who were either linked to known terrorist organizations or were former members of these organizations.

On March 16, 2025, Multiple news outlets reported that a top LeT commander named Abu Qatal Sindhi was killed by ‘unknown gunmen’ in the Jhelum area of Pakistan. Sindhi was a key LeT operative responsible for coordinating several major attacks in the Rajouri-Poonch region along Line of Control.

In 2025 India–Pakistan conflict, R&AW supplied intelligence about terrorist hideouts in Pakistan to Indian Armed Forces for Operation Sindoor.

In August 2026, a video went viral featuring Lashkar-e-Taiba operative Rizwan Hanif, in which he admitted that more than 30 LeT terrorists have been killed by the Indian intelligence agencies over the past three to four years across several Pakistani cities, including Peshawar, Karachi, Rawalpindi, Muzaffarabad, and Rawalakot. These killings are part of what analysts describe as the "unknown gunman model," in which R&AW established a network inside Pakistan to eliminate terror leaders and commanders directly or indirectly involved in acts of terrorism against India.

==== Philippines ====
In March 2023, with the help of Indian intelligence inputs, officers from the Philippine Bureau of Immigration, the Cybercrime Investigation and Coordinating Center and the National Intelligence Coordinating Agency arrested three suspected members of the Khalistan Tiger Force (KTF) in the central Philippine city of Iloilo. The suspects were deported back to India in May 2023.

==== Saudi Arabia ====
Since the 1990s, given its position as the largest source of funds and promoter of Salafist ideology and being considered major security challenge for India. R&AW has greatly expanded its activities and operation in Saudi Arabia. Abdul Karim Tunda was captured in Saudi Arabia and was secretly brought to India.

Since 2012, R&AW has carried out numerous operations in Saudi Arabia. It is only because of such operations that dozens of high-ranking terrorists like Zabiuddin Ansari, Habibur Rahman, Sabeel Ahmed, Muhammed Gulnawaz etc. have been deported and arrested in India.

In April 2023 the Saudi cabinet gave approval for joint cooperation with Indian intelligence agencies. It also approved Riyadh's status as a dialogue partner for SCO as India prepares to host the SCO summit in July. India-Saudi defence and security partnership has been steadily growing. There were a number of high-level bilateral visits and meetings, beginning with the first-ever official visit to India by Lt Gen Fahd bin Abdullah Mohammed Al-Mutair, commander of Royal Saudi Land Forces.

==== Sri Lanka ====
In the early 1980s, R&AW allegedly started funding and training Tamil militants to keep a check on Sri Lanka, which had helped Pakistan in the Indo-Pak War by allowing Pakistani ships to refuel at Sri Lankan ports. R&AW split the Tamil militants into more than 20 groups, among which Liberation Tigers of Tamil Eelam (LTTE) was one. However, when LTTE disobeyed the directions offered by R&AW, the agency switched sides and started providing intelligence support to Sri Lanka. When Prime Minister of India Rajiv Gandhi was forced to send the Indian Peace Keeping Force (IPKF) under Operation Pawan in 1987 to restore normalcy in the region. The disastrous mission of the IPKF was blamed by many on the lack of coordination between the IPKF and R&AW. Its most disastrous manifestation was the Heliborne assault on LTTE HQ in the Jaffna University campus in the opening stages of Operation Pawan. The dropping paratroopers became easy targets for the LTTE. A number of soldiers were killed. The assassination of Rajiv Gandhi ended India's involvement in Sri Lankan Civil war.

In 2010, R&AW carried out a snatch operation in Sri Lanka, in which a top HuJI militant Sheikh Abdul Khawaja – handler of the 26/11 Mumbai terror attackers was captured and secretly taken away to India.

In 2015, it was allegedly reported by the Sri Lankan newspaper The Sunday Times, that R&AW had played a role in uniting the opposition, to bring about the defeat of Mahinda Rajapaksa. There had been growing concern in the Indian government, on the increasing influence of economic and military rival China in Sri Lankan affairs. Rajapaksa further upped the ante by allowing 2 Chinese submarines to dock in 2014, without informing India, in spite of a stand still agreement to this effect between India and Sri Lanka. The growing Chinese tilt of Rajapaksa was viewed by India with unease. Further, it was alleged, that R&AW's Chief of Station in Colombo, helped coordination of talks within the opposition, and convincing former PM Ranil Wickremasinghe not to stand against Rajapaksa, but to choose a common opposition candidate, who had better chances of winning. The station chief was also alleged to have been in touch with Chandrika Kumaratunga, who played a key role in convincing Maithripala Sirisena to be the common candidate. However these allegations were denied by the Indian Government and the Sri Lankan Foreign Minister Mangala Samaraweera.

Before the 2019 Easter bombings, R&AW had issued precision intelligence warnings to its Sri Lankan counterpart about an impending terrorist attack. All of these warnings were based on HUMINT gathered by it.

==== Tajikistan ====
In the mid-1990s, after the rise of Pakistan backed Taliban in Afghanistan, India started supporting the Northern Alliance. In order to provide support, India had acquired Farkhor Air Base. This airbase was used by R&AW, along with M.I., as a base of operations for all their activities directed to Afghanistan like covert paramilitary operations and HUMINT gathering. The airbase was also used by ARC and Directorate of Air Intelligence (DAI), to provide aerial reconnaissance to Northern Alliance.

==== Turkey ====
During the 2015 G20 Antalya summit, the R&AW station in Ankara increased its strength in order to provide additional security cover for visiting PM Modi, along with SPG. Officers from MI5 and Mossad were also deployed to provide Security as part of liaison agreement.

=== Australia ===
A detailed report from The Washington Post and The Sydney Morning Herald revealed R&AW's deep operations in the country. Australian authorities expelled two Indian intelligence operatives in 2020 for being members of an elaborate "nest of spies" that attempted to steal sensitive information about defence technology, major airport security and trade relationships.

ASIO Director-General Mike Burgess revealed in 2021 that ASIO had uncovered a "nest of spies" from R&AW, whose operations included grooming politicians and a foreign embassy as informants and R&AW had also recruited an Australian government official with security clearance.

=== Europe ===
==== Belgium ====
In 2021, R&AW is reported to have foiled an assassination plot hatched by Khalistan Commando Force militants from Belgium and United Kingdom, to target farmers' leader protesting at Delhi.

==== Germany ====
Since 2014, R&AW has undertaken numerous physical surveillance, identification and tracking operations in Germany, targeted towards Khalistani militants and Islamic fundamentalists. It has aggressively recruited agents inside pro-Khalistan circles all across Germany, in cities like Frankfurt and Berlin.

In 2019 a surveliiance operation was undertaken with the target being Gurmeet Singh Bagga, co-leader of the Khalistan Zindabad Force, and a fugitive wanted for the Punjab drone arms drop case.

==== Italy ====
After 26/11, it was uncovered that Pakistan's ISI had not only laundered a large amount of money for the attack but also arranged VOIP calls that allowed the handlers to talk to the militants through the Italian city of Brescia.

In order to counter these activities, R&AW established a new station in Rome. Since then, it has undertaken hundreds of operations, directed towards sleeper cells/operatives of Pakistan-based Islamic and Khalistani militant organisations. It has also aggressively recruited agents inside Pro-Khalistan circles all across Italy.

==== United Kingdom ====
During the 1980s, R&AW launched an extensive operation in London to neutralise UK-based Pakistani national Abdul Khan, who had played an instrumental role in sheltering extremists and planning attacks in India.

Since the suppression and defeat of Khalistani insurgency in the late 1990s, R&AW has greatly expanded its informant network inside Khalistani circles and associations in the UK. Wanted Khalistanis like Paramjeet Singh Pamma and Kuldeep Singh Chaheru have been living in UK since they fled in 1992, thus necessitating increased R&AW presence.

On 15 June 2023, Avtar Singh Khanda, the UK-based chief of the Khalistan Liberation Force (KLF) was suddenly admitted to the hospital with a case of blood cancer, and later died. His followers in the UK believe that Indian intelligence had him poisoned and are demanding the full medical report.

=== North America ===
==== Canada ====
Kanishka Bombing case: On 23 June 1985 Air India's Flight 182 was blown up near Ireland and 339 people died. On the same day, another explosion took place at Tokyo's Narita airport's transit baggage building where baggage was being transferred from Cathay Pacific Flight No CP 003 to Air India Flight 301 which was scheduled for Bangkok. Both aircraft were loaded with explosives from Canadian airports. Flight 301 got saved because of a delay in its departure. This was considered as a major setback to R&AW for failing to gather enough intelligence about the Khalistani organisation.

In April 2020, it was reported that R&AW and IB had launched an extensive operation in 2009–2015, to influence the Canadian government and politicians into supporting India's interests. Canada has long being accused by India for being a safe haven for Khalistani separatists.

In July 2020, Canada put two Sikh men on Passenger Protect, the Canadian no-fly list, after Canadian Security Intelligence Service had received information from R&AW that both intended to travel to Pakistan and carry out an ISI-backed terrorist attack inside India. One of the men was identified as the son of Lakhbir Singh Rode, a well-known Khalistani separatist.

On 19 June 2023, Hardeep Singh Nijjar, a prominent Khalistani leader and alleged chief of the Khalistan Tiger Force was shot to death outside the parking lot of Guru Nanak Sikh Gurdwara in Surrey, British Columbia. Nijjar was accused of training and funding members of the separatist group and had been declared a terrorist by India, who put a bounty of ₹10 lakh (equivalent to ₹13 lakh or US$14,000 in 2026) for information leading to his arrest. This was heavily seen as an R&AW assassination operation by not only followers of Nijjar, but also from Canadian officials. On 18 September 2023, Canadian Prime Minister Justin Trudeau formally accused the Indian government of the killing and acknowledged the expulsion of a prominent Indian diplomat responsible for R&AW activities in the country. India rejected Canada's allegations of involvement in Nijjar's murder, calling the Canadian government's allegations "absurd and motivated", and expelled numerous Canadian diplomats.

==== United States ====
On 23 November 2023, The Financial Times reported that the United States had foiled a plan to assassinate Gurpatwant Singh Pannun, a Sikh separatist, on American soil. Following this, the US requested India to hold accountable those responsible for the plot. The plot in the United States coincided with the June 18 shooting death of Hardeep Singh Nijjar in Surrey, B.C., near Vancouver — an operation also linked to R&AW. Experts and officials say that the foiled assassination is part of an escalating campaign of aggression by R&AW against alleged Sikh Separatists in Asia, Europe, USA and Canada.

On 10 December 2023, The Washington Post reported that an R&AW officer established a fake news site to spread disinformation against critics of the Modi government.

On 20 March 2024, Bloomberg reported that an Indian investigation had found "rogue operative" who were not authorized by the government to be involved in the plot. Additionally, at least one person who was directly involved in the alleged assassination attempt is no longer employed by R&AW. However, India has not initiated any criminal action against them. According to The Washington Post, it is the U.S. intelligence agencies assessment that the operation targeting Pannun was approved by Samant Goel, the R&AW chief at the time.

On 15 October 2024 Hindustan Times reported that India has conveyed to the United States that it (India) has arrested the "rogue operative". The "rogue operative" had made bail in April 2024 according to The Indian Express. The "rogue operative" was arrested in an extortion case.

On 18 November 2024 The New Indian Express reported that the "rogue operative" had sought exemption from physical appearance in the court citing threat to his life.

On 15 January 2025 The Indian Express reported that an inquiry committee which was formed by the Government of India after US allegation regarding Gurpatwant Singh Pannun came to light had recommended legal action against an unnamed individual and the committee also recommended "functional improvements in systems and procedures as well as initiation of steps that could strengthen India's response capability, ensure systematic controls and coordinated action in dealing with matters like this."

== Controversies ==
R&AW's controversies and failures at times can be attributed to weak political leadership which translated into operational hurdles manifesting in the form of political interference, budget constraints, Inter Services/Departmental/Cadre rivalry and corruption.

- In the early 1980s, K.V. Unnikrishnan, R&AW officer stationed in Colombo was honey-trapped by CIA. Between 1985 and 1987 he gave away information to his handler on training and arming Tamil groups including LTTE, the Indian government's negotiating positions on the peace accord with Sri Lanka and the encryption code used by the agency. He was caught by IB counterintelligence in 1987, spent a year in Tihar jail and was dismissed from IPS cadre.
- In 2004, there was a spy scandal involving the CIA. Rabinder Singh, Joint Secretary and the head of R&AW's South-East Asia department, defected to America on 5 June 2004. R&AW had already become suspicious about his movements, and he was under surveillance for a long time. Soon he was confronted by Counterintelligence officials on 19 April 2004. Rabinder Singh managed to defect with 'sensitive files' he had allegedly removed from R&AW's headquarters in south New Delhi. This embarrassing fiasco and national security failure were attributed to weak surveillance, shoddy investigation, and lack of coordination between the Counterintelligence and Security, Intelligence Bureau (IB) and R&AW. According to unconfirmed reports, Singh has surfaced in Virginia, USA. Recently in an affidavit submitted to the court, R&AW deposed that Singh has been traced in New Jersey. It has been speculated in the book Mission R&AW that although the CIA was found directly involved in compromising Singh and Unnikrishnan, at least eight other R&AW officers managed to clandestinely migrate and settle in foreign countries like the US and Canada with the help of their spy agencies.
- In September 2007, R&AW was involved in a controversy due to a high-profile CBI raid at the residence of Major General (retired) V K Singh, a retired Joint Secretary of R&AW who has recently written a book on R&AW where it was alleged that political interference and corruption in the intelligence agency has made it vulnerable to defections. One of the instances of corruption mentioned in the book was the preference given by R&AW departments towards purchasing intelligence from the Rohde and Schwarz company. A reason for such corruption as explained by the author is that "...R&AW was not answerable to any outside agency – the control of the Prime Minister's Office was perfunctory, at best – many officers thought that they were not only above the law but a law unto themselves." A case under the Official Secrets Act has also been filed against V K Singh.
- On 19 August 2008, the R&AW Director (Language) who was also head of the R&AW Training Institute in Gurgaon from 2005 tried to commit suicide in front of Prime Minister's Office, alleging inaction and wrong findings to a sexual harassment complaint filed against a Joint Secretary, who was on deputation to R&AW. She was discharged from duty on the ground that she was mentally unfit and that her identity was disclosed. She was later separately charged with criminal trespass, human trafficking and for her repeated attempts to commit suicide. The Central Administrative Tribunal (CAT) ordered R&AW to reinstate her however R&AW filed an appeal against the CAT order which is pending before Delhi High Court. On 20 January 2011 she was sent for psychological evaluation and medical detention by a Delhi High Court judge when she tried to strip herself in the court protesting over the slow pace of her trial. The psychological evaluation report stated that 'she may be suffering a mental problem due to loss of job and her continuous run-ins at the courts, but she was certainly not suffering from any permanent or grave mental disorder.' On 15 December 2014, the Supreme Court of India quashed the 2008 media release, which proclaimed Ms. Bhatia as mentally unstable, on the ground that it affected the "dignity, reputation and privacy of a citizen".
- On 4 February 2009, A senior technical officer worked in the division was arrested by CBI on graft charges, the officer was accused of demanding and accepting a bribe of ₹ 100,000 from a Chennai based manufacturer for obtaining an export license.
- In September 2009, seven Additional Secretaries from the RAS cadre had gone on protest leave after A. B. Mathur, an IPS officer, superseded them to the post of Special Secretary. Over the years the tussle between the RAS cadre and officers on deputation from IPS cadre has caused friction in the working of the agency.
- In 2007, there was a spy scandal involving Bangladesh. A Bangladeshi DGFI agent concealed his nationality before joining R&AW, and was known by the name of Diwan Chand Malik in the agency. He was known to have some important intel which was damaging for the national security. He joined the agency in 1999 and used to live in East Delhi. A case of cheating and forgery was filed against him at the Lodhi Colony police station on the basis of a complaint by a senior R&AW official.
- In the edition of 8 February 2010 Outlook Magazine reported on former R&AW Chief, Ashok Chaturvedi, used agency funds to take his wife along on international trips and after retirement, Chaturvedi had a diplomatic passport issued for himself and his wife.
- On 25 March 2016, Pakistan claimed that they arrested a R&AW operative by the name of Kulbhushan Jadhav who was operating in Balochistan province under the cover name Hussain Mubarak Patel and used to operate a jewelry shop in Chahbahar, Iran. However, Indian MEA said that though Jadhav was an Indian Navy officer who retired prematurely, he has no link with the government. The Indian High Commission has also sought consular access to Jadhav, but Pakistan has not agreed to it and Pakistan leaked some information without realising glaring loopholes in the same. The Iranian President Hassan Rouhani also dismissed Pakistan's claim and stated them as mere rumors. According to an Indian official, Jadhav owns a cargo business in Iran and had been working out of Bandar Abbas and Chabahar ports. "It appears that he strayed into Pakistani waters. But there is also a possibility that he was lured into Pakistan sometime back and fake documents were created on him.

== In popular culture ==
R&AW has been depicted widely in Bollywood and regional movies, television and web series and novels.

Films in the 1960s and 1970s, such as Aankhen (1968), starring Dharmendra and Mala Sinha, Prem Pujari starring Dev Anand in 1970, and Hindustan Ki Kasam (1973) starring Raaj Kumar and Priya Rajvansh referenced "agents" and "espionage". However, since the late 1990s and early 2000, Bollywood and other regional films have openly mentioned R&AW and its allied units, with the intelligence agencies at the center of the plot. In The Hero (2003) film Sunny Deol played a R&AW spy, who eliminates Pakistani terrorists who tried to gain bombs to use against India. In Romeo Akbar Walter (2019), John Abraham played the role of a spy recruited by the Research and Analysis Wing. Uri (2019) highlights the collaborative role of specialized agencies. It depicts the National Security Council and the agency (Yami Gautam's character Pallavi Sharma) working alongside ISRO for satellite imagery and DRDO for drone surveillance to plan the operation. In the film Mission Majnu (2023), Siddharth Malhotra played a secret r&aw field agent. In the 2023 film Khufiya directed by Vishal Bharadwaj, actress Tabu played a role of R&AW operative.

The agency also serves as the backdrop for the 2025 Hindi film Dhurandhar and its sequel Dhurandhar: The Revenge, which offers a raw, authentic and intense portrayal of Indian intelligence that stands in stark contrast to conventional Bollywood cinema. Former R&AW chief Vikram Sood has criticized Bollywood spy films like Pathaan, Ek Tha Tiger, and Raazi for being unrealistic, glamorous, and inaccurate depictions of intelligence work. He considers these movies, which often feature stylized action and R&AW-ISI romances, as mere entertainment rather than reality. Real agents, he notes, are discreet and professional, not superheroes.

During 2010 to 2020, many films on R&AW were produced. Among them, Madras Cafe, Baby, Phantom and D-Day most accurately depict the realistic work culture and life of officers and agents, following the Dhurandhar Film Series.

Vikram (1986), a Tamil movie and the first Indian film to use computer for recording the songs, features a R&AW agent and his mission to safeguard the Indian Missile Program. The Highway (1995), a popular Malayalam movie features Suresh Gopi in the role of a R&AW officer. In 2003 Tamil film, Ottran Arjun Sarja plays a R&AW agent who is on the trail of a terror plot to destabilise the country. The critically acclaimed Tamil movie Vishwaroopam (2013), Kamal Hassan plays the role of a veteran R&AW operative during the war in Afghanistan. In the 2019 Telugu movie Goodachari, Adivi Sesh plays a fresh recruit to the agency.

In television series, Epic TV in Adrishya, a documentary show dedicated to India's legendary spies broadcast the biography of Ravindra Kaushik, R&AW's most celebrated spy. In another episode India's current NSA, former R&AW agent Ajit Doval's story was featured. 2612, which used to air on Life OK, featured Cabir Maira as a R&AW agent Anand Swami who helps an STF officer Randeep Rathore to save the country from a terrorist attack. Time Bomb 9/11, a series aired on Zee TV, featured Rajeev Khandelwal in the role of a R&AW field officer. Zee Bangla featured a serial named Mohona where the chief protagonist is a R&AW officer. The Indian version of 24 has a host of characters affiliated with R&AW.

In web series, Special Ops released on Hotstar has Kay Kay Menon in the role of a seasoned R&AW officer and his task force chasing a terror mastermind. Set in the volatile 1970s, Saare Jahan Se Accha is a Netflix espionage thriller that follows a resilient Indian spy as he infiltrates Pakistan to sabotage its developing nuclear weapons program in a high-stakes battle of wits. Although not mentioned explicitly, R&AW serves as the backdrop for The Family Man, featuring Manoj Bajpayee as an intelligence officer striving to thwart terrorist threats while managing a high-pressure job and a volatile domestic life. The Sacred Games on Netflix has a R&AW agent played by Radhika Apte.

Some commentators have linked the surge of Indian films and TV series on espionage thriller genre, as a marker of Pax Indica, diverging from the older paradigms of pacifism associated with Gandhi and Nehru and on the motif of an increasingly assertive rising superpower.

== See also ==
- List of intelligence agencies
- Special Group (India) – Confidential special operations forces
- Intelligence Bureau (India)
- National Technical Research Organisation
- NIA Most Wanted
- Indian Intelligence Community
