= Hari Ram Sardar =

Indian politician

Hari Ram Sardar was an Indian politician from Jharkhand. He is a two time member of the Bihar Legislative Assembly representing the Jharkhand Mukti Morcha from the Potka constituency in Purbi Singhbhum district.

Sardar became an MLA for the first time winning the 1990 Bihar Legislative Assembly election and retained the Potka seat for the Jharkhand Mukti Morcha party in the 1995 Bihar Legislative Assembly election.

== See also ==
- Sanatan Sardar
- Amulya Sardar
- Maneka Sardar
