= Potka =

Village in Jharkhand

- Village
- Location in Jharkhand, India Potka (India)
- Coordinates: 22.6221°N 86.2133°E
- Country: India
- State: Jharkhand
- District: East Singhbhum

Government
  - Type: Federal democracy

Population (2011)
  - Total: 1,770

Languages *
  - Official: Hindi, Santali
- Time zone: UTC+5:30 (IST)
- PIN: 831002
- Telephone/ STD code: 0657
- Vehicle registration: JH 05
- Literacy: 80.18%
- Lok Sabha constituency: Jamshedpur
- Vidhan Sabha constituency: Potka
- Website: jamshedpur.nic.in

Potka is a village in the Potka CD block in the Dhalbhum subdivision of the East Singhum district in the Indian state of Jharkhand.

== Geography ==
Cities, towns and locations in East Singhbhum district in Kolhan Division (Locations around Jamshedpur are shown in the Jamshedpur Urban Agglomeration map - see Bagbera Colony page)
M: municipality, R: rural/ urban centre, CT: census town, T: tourist centre
Owing to space constraints in the small map, the actual locations in a larger map may vary slightly

=== Location ===
Potka is located at 22.6221°N 86.2133°E.

=== Area overview ===
The area shown in the map "forms a part of the Chota Nagpur Plateau and is a hilly upland tract". The main rivers draining the district are the Subarnarekha and the Kharkai. The area lying between Jamshedpur and Ghatshila is the main industrial mining zone. The rest of the district is primarily agricultural. In the district, as of 2011, 56.9% of the population lives in the rural areas and a high 43.1% lives in the urban areas.

Note: The map alongside presents some of the notable locations in the district. All places marked in the map are linked in the larger full screen map.

== Civic administration ==
There is a police station at Potka.

The headquarters of Potka CD block is located at Potka village.

== Demographics ==
According to the 2011 Census of India, Potka had a total population of 1,770, of which 935 (53%) were males and 835 (47%) were females. Population in the age range 0–6 years was 246. The total number of literate persons in Potka was 1,222 (80.18% of the population over 6 years).

(*For language details see Potka block#Language and religion)

== Transport ==
A short stretch of Hata-Musabani Road links Potka to Hata, where State Highway 6 meets National Highway 220.

Haludpukur Railway Station on the Tatanagar-Badampahar branch line is located 8 km away.

== Education ==
Kasturba Gandhi Balika Vidyalaya is a Hindi-medium girls only institution established in 2006. It has facilities for teaching from class VI to class XII. The school has a playground, a library with 603 books and has 5 computers for teaching and learning purposes.

Project Girl's High School is a Hindi-medium girls only institution established in 1984. It has facilities for teaching in classes IX and X. Now Intermediate has been started in all streams. The school has a playground and a library with 224 books.

Middle School Potka is a Hindi-medium coeducational institution established in 1953.
