= Sanatan Sardar =

Indian politician and tribal leader

Minister of Water Resources, Government of Bihar
- In office 1985–1987

Member of Legislative Assembly, Government of Bihar
- In office 1977-82 (Janata Dal), 1982-85 (Bhartiya Janata Party), 1985-90 (Congress)
- Constituency: Potka

Personal details
- Born: Roladih, Potka, Bihar, India
- Died: 10 October 2013 Roladih, Potka, Jharkhand, India
- Cause of death: TBA
- Occupation: Politician, Tribal Leader, Farmer

Sanatan Sardar was a veteran Indian politician and a tribal leader. Sardar was a minor irrigation minister from 1985 to 1987 in undivided Bihar, he thrice represented Potka as Janata Dal (1977–82), BJP (1982–85) and Congress (1985–90) MLA.

== Early life ==
Veteran leader Sanatan Sardar was born in Roladih village in Potka block of the district, in a Bhumij tribal family. Sardar left behind his wife, two sons, two daughters and four grandchildren.

He was teacher by profession and served Potka High School as headmaster before venturing into active politics.

== Political journey ==
Sanatan Sardar played an important role in Potka's progress. Sardar represented Potka as Janata Dal MLA (1977–82) and later as BJP MLA (1982–85) and in his last term he represented the constituency as Congress MLA (1985–90). He was also a minister for minor irrigation in erstwhile Bihar in 1985–87.

Despite holding a high position in the erstwhile Bihar government, he never travelled in a car or any luxury vehicle; he always preferred to walk. Even till the last breath, he lived in a small mud house.

== Death ==
Veteran tribal leader and three-term MLA from Potka reserve seat, Sanatan Sardar died on Thursday, 10 October 2013 after prolonged illness.

The 78-year-old Sardar died at his ancestral house in Roladih village in Potka block of the district. Sardar was suffering from heart disease and fluctuating blood sugar levels, and was admitted to RIMS for treatment. The politicians across party-line expressed condolence on the demise of the veteran leader.

"Sanatanji was a down to earth person. I pray to God to give strength to his family to overcome this grief," said district Congress president, Ravinder Jha following his return from the last rites of the departed leader.

Political fraternity of the city has expressed deep sorrow over his demise. When contacted senior Congress leader SRA Rizwi Chabban said, his death is a huge loss to people of the State.

His last journey was taken out from his residence in Potka in which several party leaders and well wishers participated.

== See also ==
- Potka
- Amulya Sardar
- Maneka Sardar
- Sanjib Sardar
