= Hata, Purvi Singhbhum =

Hata
- Village
- Location in Jharkhand, India Hata (India)
- Coordinates: 22.6221°N 86.1585°E
- Country: India
- State: Jharkhand
- District: East Singhbhum

Government
  - Type: Federal democracy
- Time zone: UTC+5:30 (IST)
- PIN: 831002
- Telephone/ STD code: 0657
- Vehicle registration: JH 05
- Lok Sabha constituency: Jamshedpur
- Vidhan Sabha constituency: Potka
- Website: jamshedpur.nic.in

Hata is a village in the Potka CD block in the Dhalbhum subdivision of the East Singhbhum district in the Indian state of Jharkhand.

== Geography ==
Cities, towns and locations in East Singhbhum district in Kolhan Division (Locations around Jamshedpur are shown in the Jamshedpur Urban Agglomeration map - see Bagbera Colony page)
M: municipality, R: rural/ urban centre, CT: census town, T: tourist centre
Owing to space constraints in the small map, the actual locations in a larger map may vary slightly

=== Location ===
Hata is located at 22.6221°N 86.1585°E.

Hata is indicated in the Pauri village in the map of Potka CD block in the District Census Handbook, Purbi Singhbhum, Series 21, Part XII A.

=== Area overview ===
The area shown in the map "forms a part of the Chota Nagpur Plateau and is a hilly upland tract". The main rivers draining the district are the Subarnarekha and the Kharkai. The area lying between Jamshedpur and Ghatshila is the main industrial mining zone. The rest of the district is primarily agricultural. In the district, as of 2011, 56.9% of the population lives in the rural areas and a high 43.1% lives in the urban areas.

Note: The map alongside presents some of the notable locations in the district. All places marked in the map are linked in the larger full screen map.

== Transport ==
Hata is one of the terminal points of State Highway 6 where it meets National Highway 220 and Hata-Musabani Road.

Haludpukur Railway Station on the Tatanagar-Badampahar branch line is located nearby.
