= Abhay Verma (politician) =

Indian politician (born 1973)

Chief Whip of the Delhi Legislative Assembly
- Incumbent
- Assumed office 23 February 2025
- Chief Minister: Rekha Gupta
- Preceded by: Manish Sisodia

Member of Delhi Legislative Assembly
- Incumbent
- Assumed office 12 February 2020
- Preceded by: Nitin Tyagi
- Constituency: Laxmi Nagar

Personal details
- Born: 5 January 1973 (age 53) Darbhanga, Bihar, India
- Party: Bharatiya Janata Party
- Spouse: Amrita Prakash
- Children: 2
- Education: University of Delhi
- Occupation: Politician; lawyer

Abhay Verma (born 5 January 1973) is an Indian lawyer and politician from Delhi. He is a member of the Delhi Legislative Assembly and vice president of the Delhi unit of the Bharatiya Janata Party.

== Early life and education ==
Verma was born on 5 January 1973 to Bankey Bihari Verma and Urmila Devi. He received his LLB from University of Delhi in 1996. He married Amrita Prakash on 30 November 2001.

== Career ==
Verma is the vice president of Delhi unit of BJP. He was elected to the Delhi Legislative Assembly from Laxmi Nagar on 11 February 2020.

=== Controversy ===
A video was released during 2020 North East Delhi riots where Verma led a march in Laxmi Nagar. The march participants were heard chanting "Police ke hatyaaron ko, goli maaro saalon ko" (Shoot the people, who murdered the policeman). The people were also seen chanting "Jo Hindu hit ki baat karega, wohi desh pe raj karega" (People who talk about the welfare of Hindus, only they will rule in the country). After that incident, Verma claimed that it was raised by common people, not by his supporters.

== Electoral performance ==
Delhi Assembly elections, 2020: Laxmi Nagar
| Party | Candidate | Votes | % | ±% |
|---|---|---|---|---|
| BJP | Abhay Verma | 65,735 | 48.04 | +9.04 |
| AAP | Nitin Tyagi | 64,855 | 47.40 | +4.86 |
| INC | Hari Dutt Sharma | 4,872 | 3.56 | −13.70 |
| NOTA | None of the above | 550 | 0.40 | +0.10 |
| BSP | Jai Ram Lal | 446 | 0.33 | −0.17 |
| RRP | Anima Ojha | 78 | 0.06 | N/A |
| Majority | | 880 | 0.64 | −2.90 |
| Turnout | | 1,36,944 | 61.74 | −5.49 |
| BJP gain from AAP | | Swing | +6.13 | |

State Legislative Assembly
| Preceded by ? | Member of the Delhi Legislative Assembly from Laxmi Nagar Assembly constituency 2020– | Incumbent |
