= Ghaspada =

Village in Jharkhand, India

Coordinates: 22.2673°N 86.8377°E

Ghaspada is a village in the Indian state of Jharkhand. It is located in the East Singhbhum district, which is in the south-east corner of Jharkhand. Ghaspada shares its eastern border with West Bengal; they are separated by a small canal. Nearby villages include Brahmankundi, Panchbaria, Belbariya, and Gahalamuda. It has a middle school and a temple to Krishna.

== Outline ==
Ghaspada covers an area of about 1 square kilometre (0.39 sq mi) and its population is approximately 1000. Out of this, 95% are literate.

Festivals in Ghaspada include Kali puja, Makar sankranti, Saraswati puja, and 16 prahar.

Kalipuja is one of the best known festivals of this village, which starts on diwali and continues for at least four days, attracts thousands of people.

There are Jatra patry come to the village from West Bengal as well as from Odisha which make Kalipuja more enjoying for people of the village as well as around villages, around people of 30 villages to Ghaspda for seeing Kalipuja.

The village has two schools, namely, Ghaspada Middle School and Kid Play School.
