= Amulya Sardar =

Indian politician

Member of Legislative Assembly, Government of Jharkhand
- In office 2005-2009
- Constituency: Potka

Personal details
- Born: 23 August 1968 Bunudih, Harina, Potka, Bihar, India
- Died: 1 March 2017 (aged 48) Bunudih, Harina, Potka, Jharkhand, India
- Party: Jharkhand Mukti Morcha
- Spouse: Kadmi Sardar
- Parent: Wakil Sardar (father)
- Education: Matric.
- Occupation: Social Service, Politician

Amulya Sardar (23 August 1968 – 1 March 2017) was an Indian politician who represented Potka Assembly constituency from 2005 to 2010 as a Member of the Jharkhand Legislative Assembly. Sardar was a member of the Jharkhand Mukti Morcha, a political party. Sardar was elected MLA for the second assembly of Jharkhand in 2005 on the ticket of Jharkhand Mukti Morcha for the first time.

== Early life and education ==
Sardar was born into a Bhumij tribal family on 23 August 1968 in Kundru Tola, Bunudih, Harina, Potka. His father Wakil Sardar was a farmer. In Potka and surrounding areas, he was very famous in the name of Jhadphunk Wale Baba. After winning the election, he stopped this work.

Sardar did his matriculation at B.P.M.S. High School, under B.S.E.B. Patna in the year 1988. He was married to Kadmi Sardar, and had five sons and two daughters in his family. He always liked to be among the public and was particularly influenced by the literature of Rabindranath Tagore. Sardar always lived a simple life.

== Political career ==
In 2005, Amulya contested the Jharkhand Legislative Assembly elections for the first time from Potka assembly seat. In Potka and surrounding areas, he was very famous in the name of Jhadphunk Wale Baba. After winning the election, he stopped this work. Amulya Sardar got the party ticket in 2005 due to the then JMM MP Sunil Mahato. On 23 January 2005, on the day of nomination, he was arrested from the old court premises due to warrants in two old cases. During his stay in jail, Sunil Mahato had campaigned for election in Potka. Later he was released on 28 February.

In 2005, Sardar, who contested for the first time from Potka assembly seat, snatched this seat by defeating BJP MLA Maneka Sardar. Amulya Sardar got 53760 votes, while Maneka Sardar had to be satisfied with only 40,001 votes. He was the second MLA in the Jharkhand Legislative Assembly after the then Speaker Inder Singh Namdhari, who always wore a turban. People used to call him in the organization by the name of the turbaned MLA.

In the 2009 elections, JMM once again gave ticket to Amulya Sardar as a sitting MLA. This time BJP candidate Maneka Sardar, taking fierce revenge for her defeat, pushed Amulya Sardar to number three. Maneka Sardar got 44,095 votes, while third-ranked Amulya had to be satisfied on 24789 votes. Congress candidate Subodh Sardar had secured the second position by getting 28305 votes.

In the 2014 elections, the central leadership of JMM did not give ticket to Amulya Sardar, due to which he left the party in dismay. Contesting as an independent (on diesel pump symbol) from Potka assembly constituency, he could not even save his deposit in this election. Amulya Sardar, who finished ninth, had to be satisfied with only 2116 votes.

== Death ==
Former JMM MLA Amulya Sardar died of cardiac arrest at his residence in Potka block of East Singhbhum district on 1 March 2017, at the age of 49. His last rites were performed in the day behind Harina, Bunudih ancestral residence. His son lit the fire. Many prominent people including former Jharkhand Chief Minister Raghuvar Das have expressed grief over his death. JMM Senior Vice-President Champai Soren, who visited Sardar's home to pay his homage, said he played a major role in the statehood movement of Jharkhand. Soren said Sardar's death was an irreparable loss to the party as he was instrumental in increasing JMM's base in rural pockets of East Singhbhum district.

== See also ==
- Potka (Vidhan Sabha constituency)
- Maneka Sardar
