= State Highway 6 (Jharkhand) =

State highway in Jharkhand, India

State Highway 6

Route information
- Length: 21 km (13 mi)

Major junctions
- From: Jugsalai
- To: Hata

Location
- Country: India
- State: Jharkhand
- Districts: East Singhbhum district

Highway system
- Roads in India; Expressways; National; State; Asian; State Highways in Jharkhand

State Highway 6 (SH 6) is a state highway in Jharkhand, India.

== Route ==
SH 6 originates from its junction with Kandra-Adityapur-Jugsalai road at Jugsalai and passes through Purihasa and terminates at its junction with National Highway 220 at Hata, near the Jharkhand-Odisha border.

The total length of SH 6 is 21 km.
