= Chakulia =

- Notified Area Council (NAC)
- Chakuliya
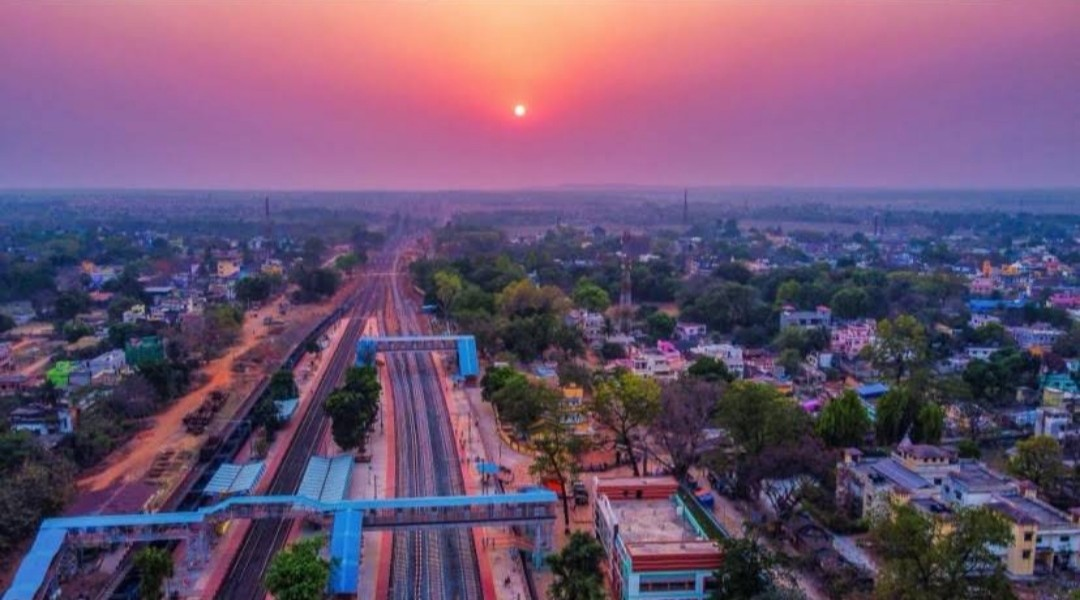
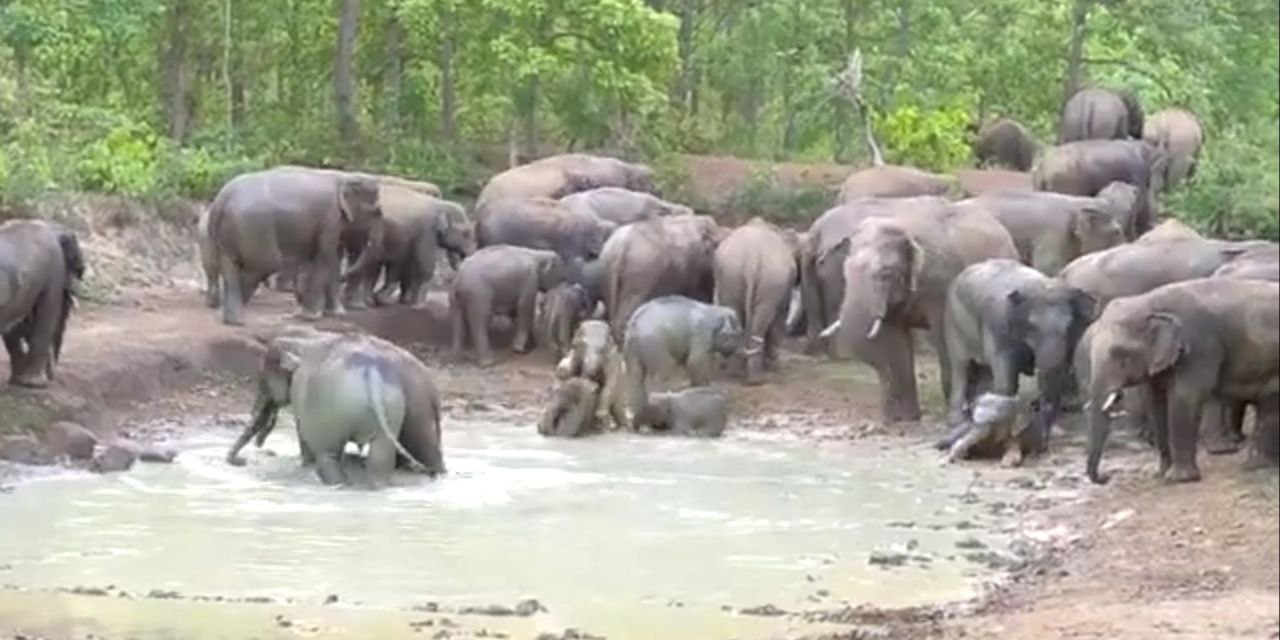
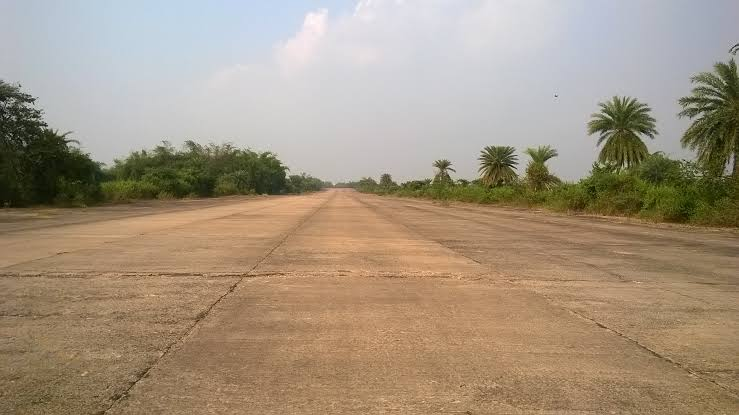
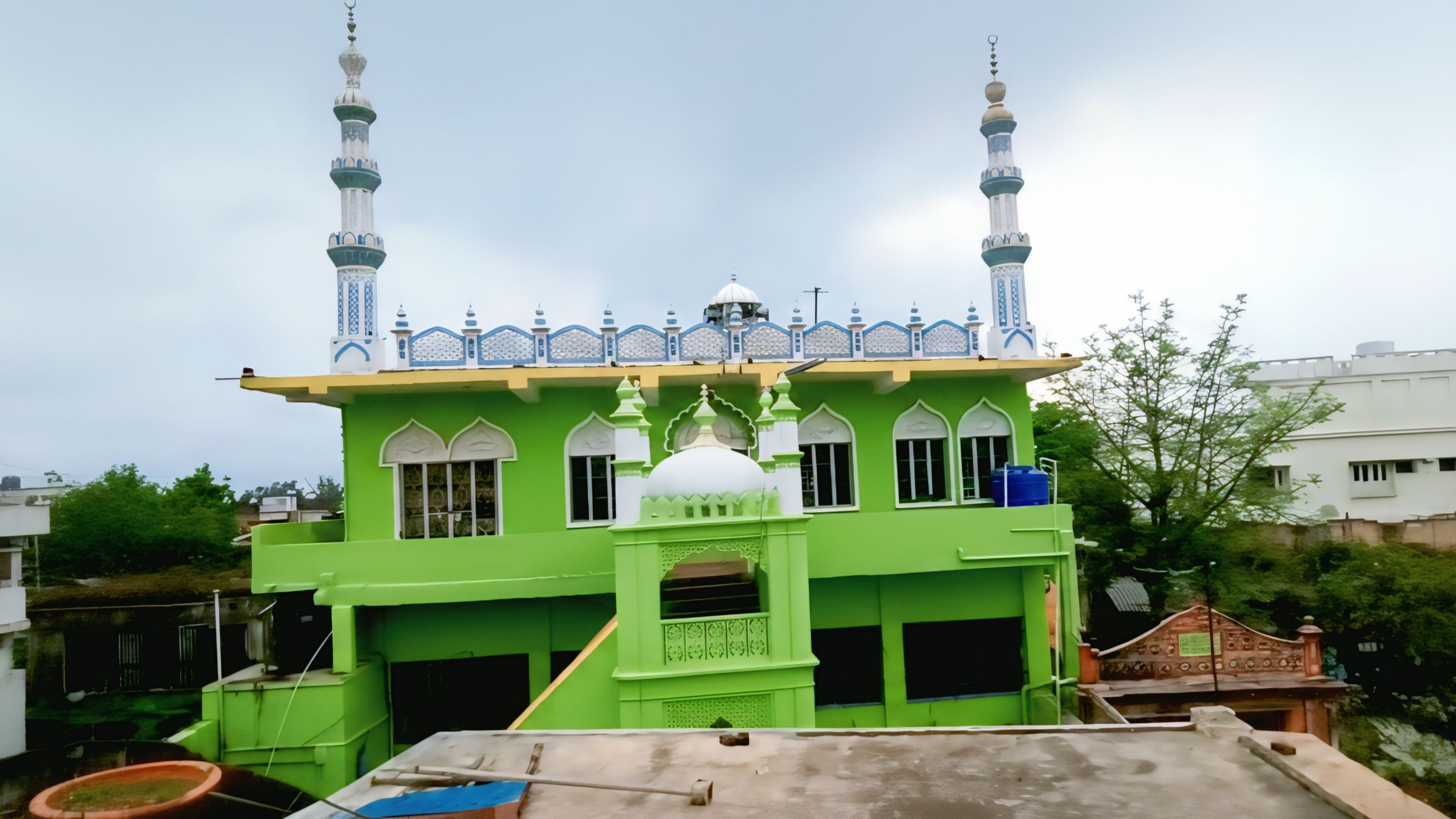
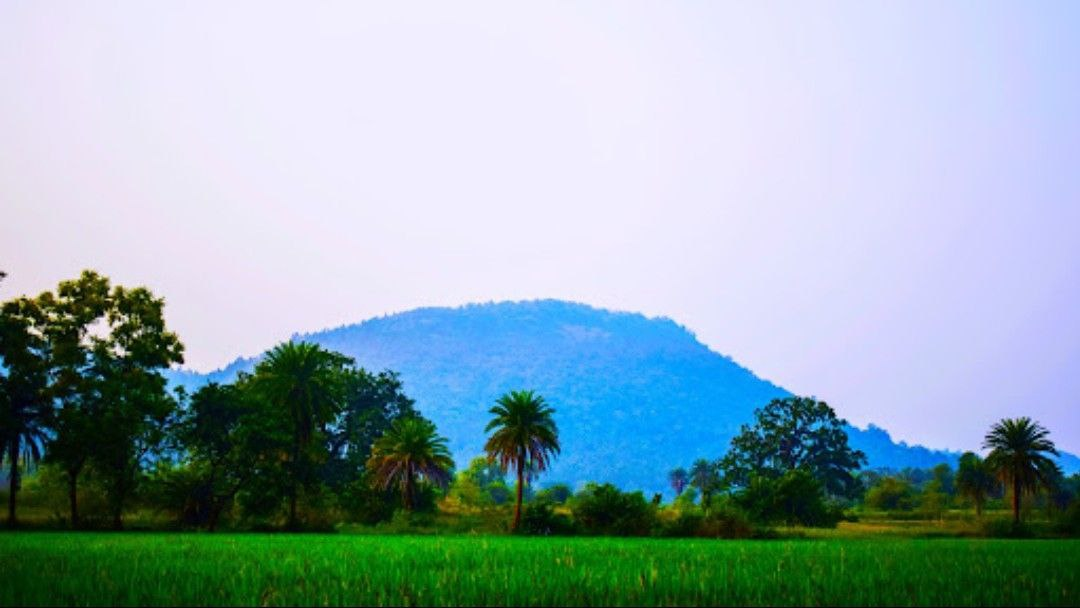
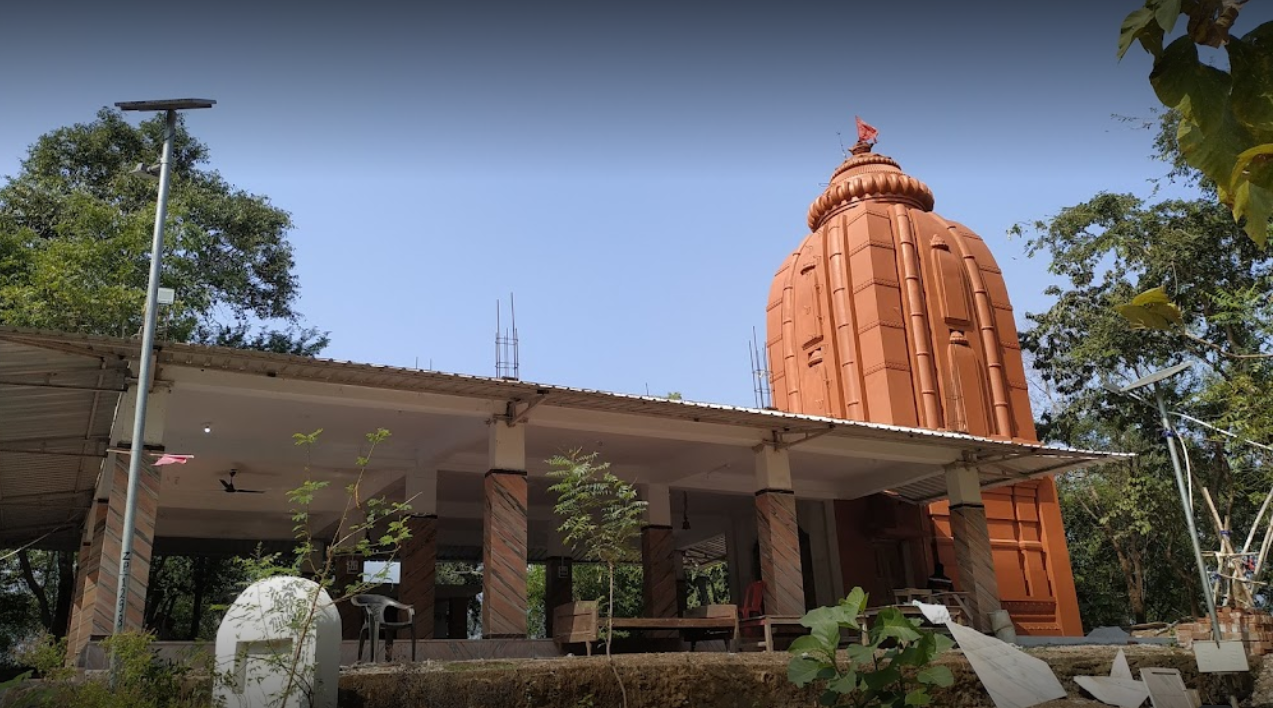
- From top to bottom: Chakulia Sunset, Elephants in Chakulia forest area (L), Chakulia Airport (R), Chakulia Muslim Basti Mosque, Kanhaiwar hill, Shiv Ram Ashram
- Nickname: CKU
- Location in Jharkhand, India Chakulia (India)
- Coordinates: 22.48°N 86.72°E
- Country: India
- State: Jharkhand
- District: East Singhbhum

Government
  - Type: Notified Area Council (NAC)
  - Body: Chakuliya Nagar Panchayat
  - Executive Officer: Motay Banra

Area
  - Urban: 15.12 km^{2} (5.84 sq mi)
  - Rural: 414.21 km^{2} (159.93 sq mi)
- Elevation: 115 m (377 ft)

Population (2011)
  - Notified Area Council (NAC): 16,306
  - Density: 1,078/km^{2} (2,790/sq mi)

Languages *
  - Official: Hindi, Santali
- Time zone: UTC+5:30 (IST)
- PIN: 832301
- Telephone code: 06594
- Vehicle registration: JH 05
- Website: udhd.jharkhand.gov.in/ulb/Chakuliya/Chakuliya.aspx

Chakulia or Chakuliya is a Notified Area Council (NAC) and 4th Municipal Corporation in the Ghatshila subdivision of the East Singhbhum district in the state of Jharkhand, India. It is 71 km from Jamshedpur City, the district headquarter.

Chakulia is known for its non-operational Chakulia Airport, Kanaishwar Hill, bamboo trees, detergent powder brand "Hindustan Soap Factory" and its beautiful nature. Chakulia is always in news headlines due to hundreds of Elephants roams in Chakulia forest area. Chakulia city gained recent recognition due to the Dhyan Foundation's goushala located at Chakulia Airport, providing shelter, treatment, and food to thousands of rescued cows from the cattle mafia at the Indo-Bangladesh border.

== History ==
An airfield was built by the British construction contractor Mr. Digar Pramotha Nath Mohanty by Das & Mohanty construction company in 1942 to conduct raids against the advancing Japanese in Burma and also for operations to transport aid to parts of China. Also, in 1971, during the war of independence of Bangladesh, a guerrilla training camp was set up and used for training volunteers. Currently, the airport has no scheduled commercial airline flights. In 2006, it was reported that the airport has been non-operational since it served during World War II.

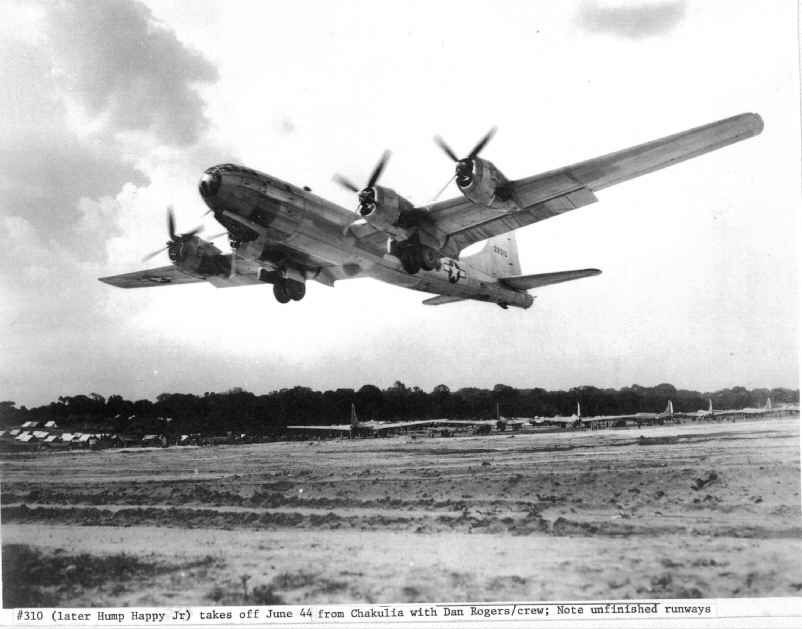
40th BG B-29 42-6310 taking off from Chakulia Airfield, India, June, 1944

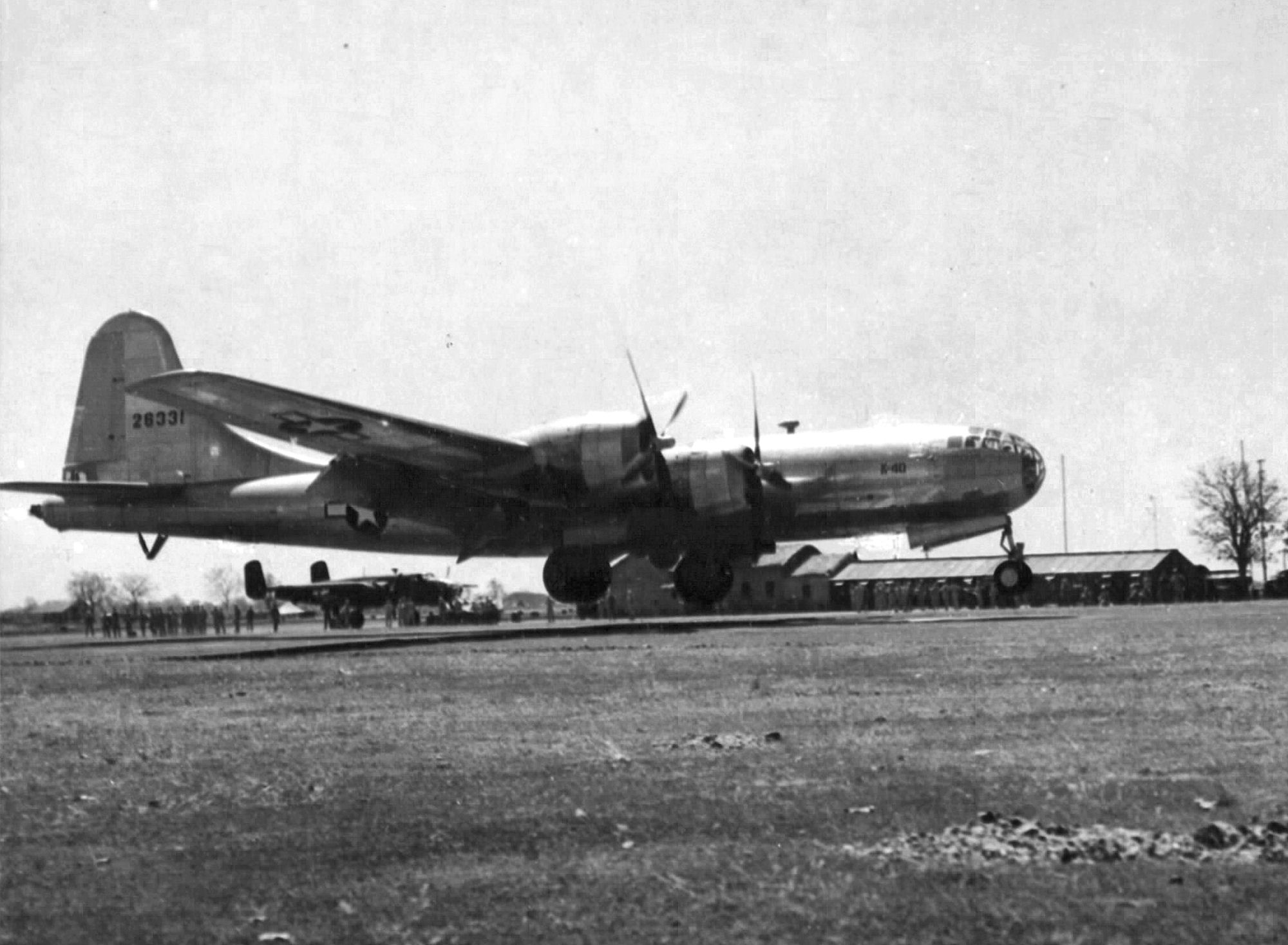
25th Bombardment Squadron - B-29 Superfortess

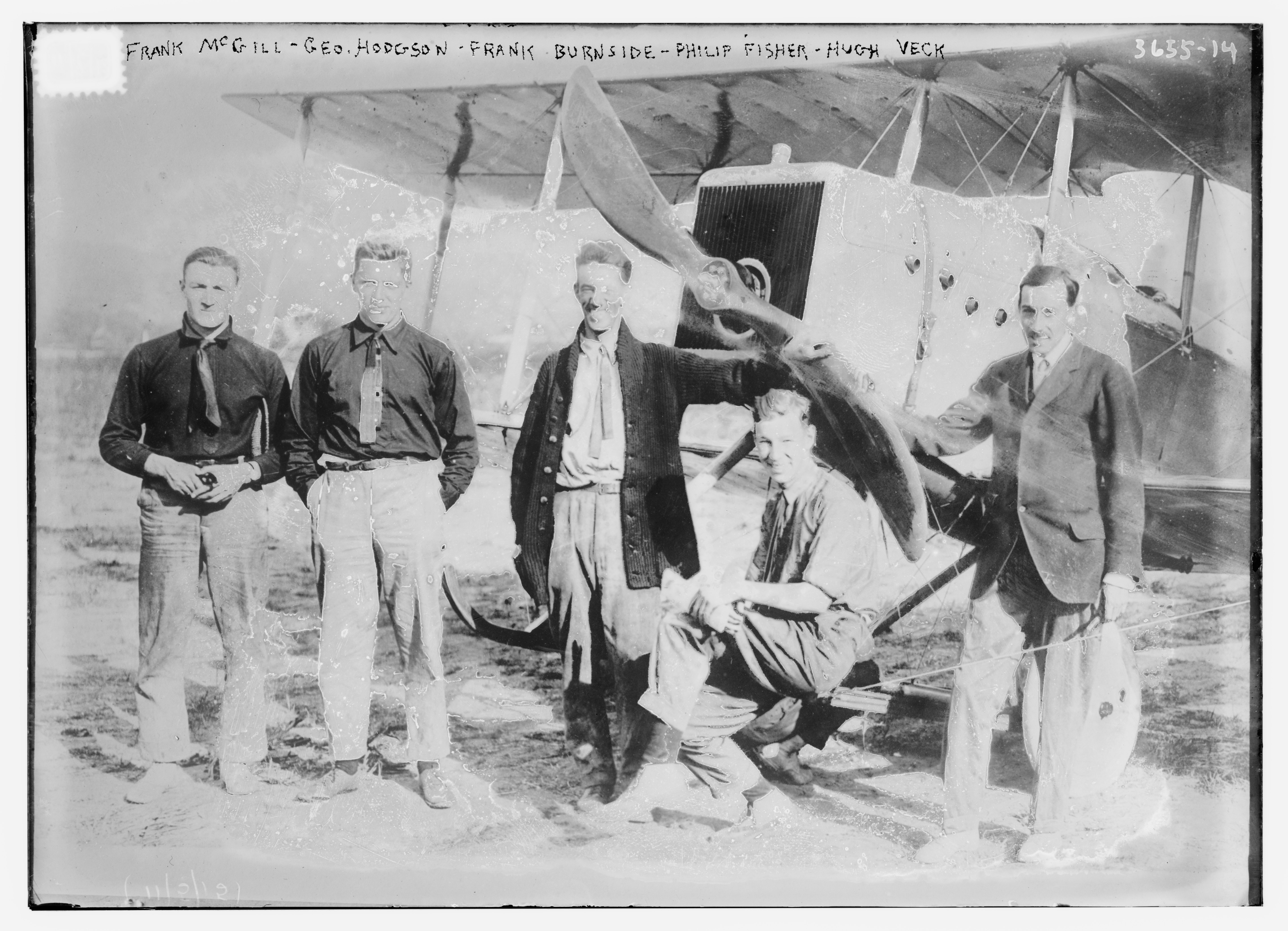
Before Flight

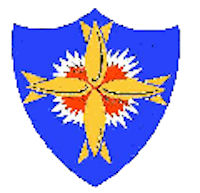
Emblem of the 40th Bombardment Group

== Geography ==
Cities, towns and locations in East Singhbhum district in Kolhan Division (Locations around Jamshedpur are shown in the Jamshedpur Urban Agglomeration map - see Bagbera Colony page)
M: municipality, R: rural/ urban centre, CT: census town, T: tourist centre
Owing to space constraints in the small map, the actual locations in a larger map may vary slightly

=== Location ===
Chakulia is located at 22.48°N 86.72°E. It has an average elevation of 115 metres (377 feet).

=== Area overview ===
The area shown in the map “forms a part of the Chota Nagpur Plateau and is a hilly upland tract”. The main rivers draining the district are the Subarnarekha and the Kharkai. The area lying between Jamshedpur and Ghatshila is the main industrial mining zone. The rest of the district is primarily agricultural. In the district, as of 2011, 56.9% of the population lives in the rural areas and a high 43.1% lives in the urban areas.

Note: The map alongside presents some of the notable locations in the district. All places marked in the map are linked in the larger full screen map.

== Civic administration ==
There is a police station at Chakulia. The headquarters of Chakulia CD block is located at Chakulia town.

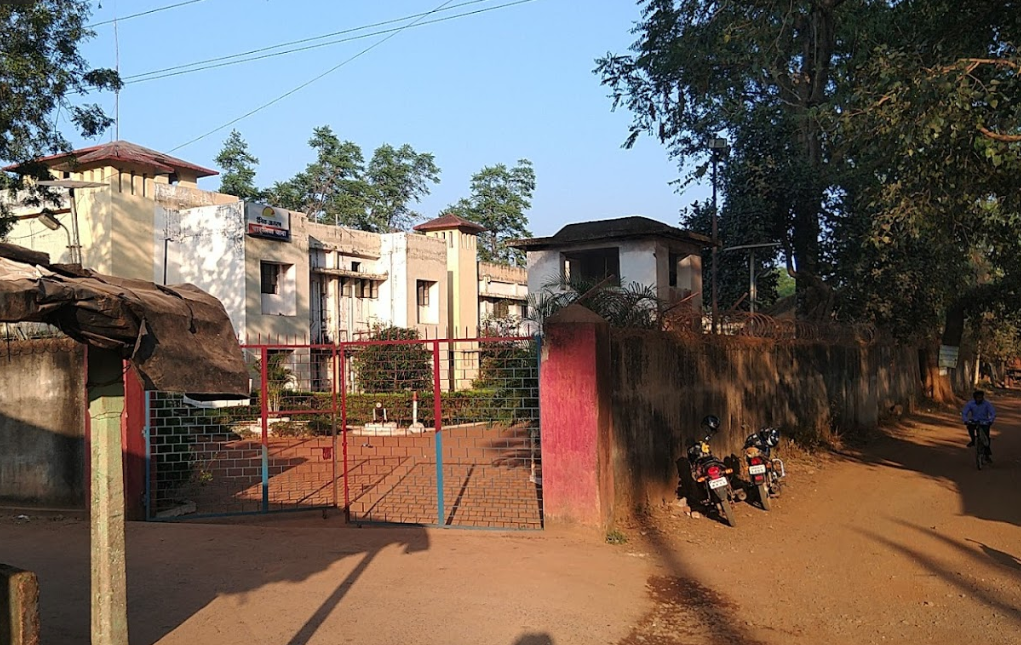
Chakulia Police Station

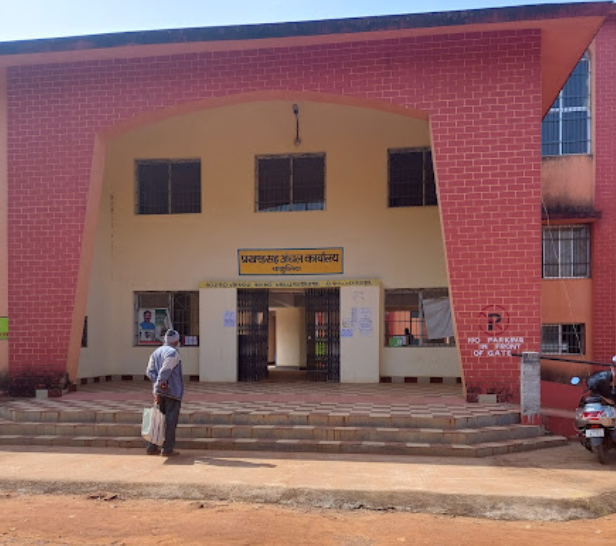
Chakulia Block

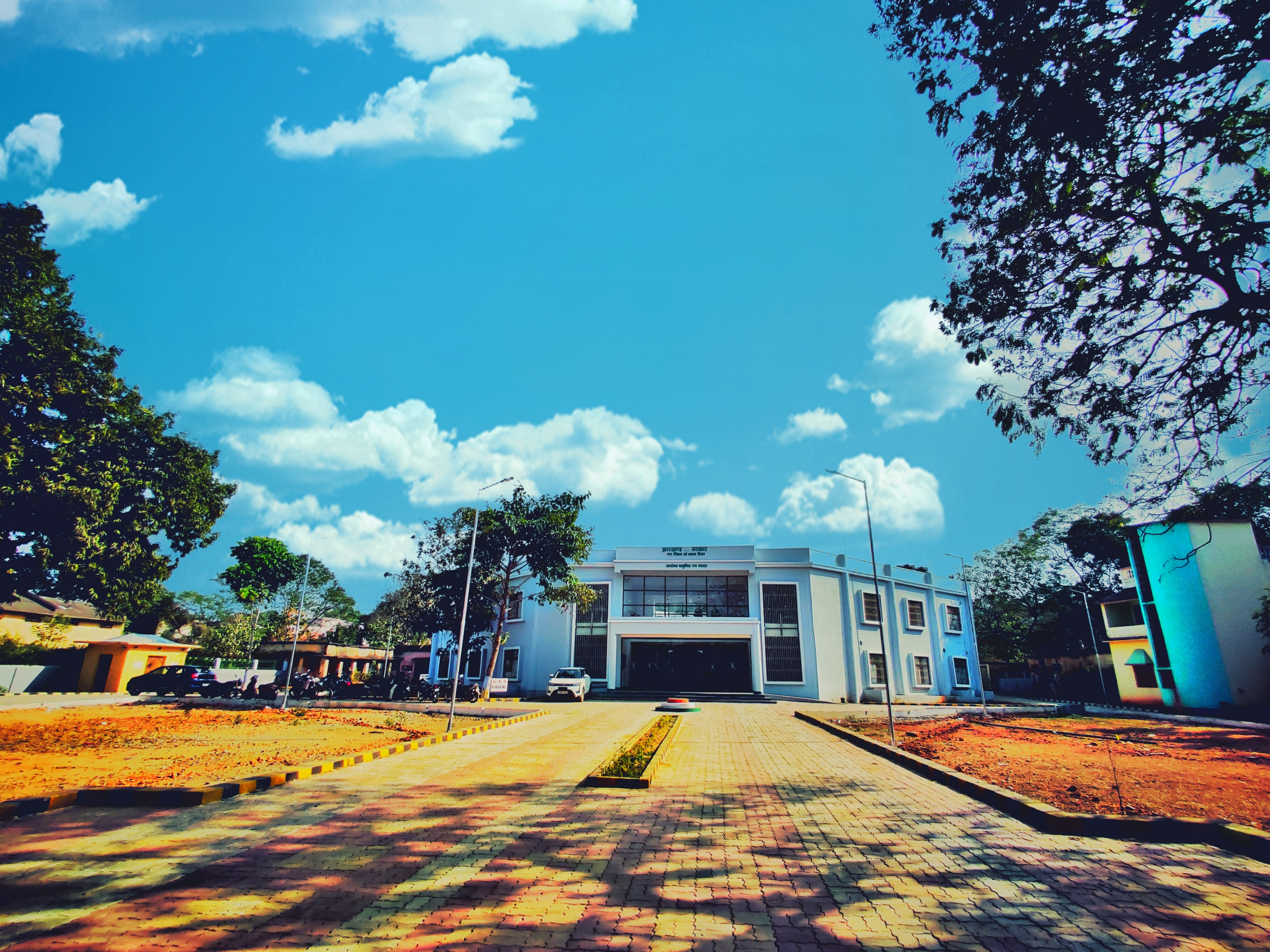
Chakulia Nagar Panchayat Bhawan

== Demographics ==
According to the 2011 Census of India, Chakulia had a total population of 16,306, of which 8,352 (51%) were males and 7,954 (49%) were females. Population in the age range 0–6 years was 2,140. The total number of literate persons in Chakulia was 11,174 (78.88% of the population over 6 years).

=== Languages ===
Languages spoken in Chakulia Town (2011)
1. Bengali (58.9%)
2. Urdu (12.6%)
3. Santali (8.37%)
4. Hindi (6.66%)
5. Marwari (4.21%)
6. Mundari (3.01%)
7. Others (6.19%)

(*For language details see Chakulia block#Language and religion)

As of 2001 India census, Chakulia had a population of 14,330. Males constitute 52% of the population and females 48%. Chakulia has an average literacy rate of 64%, higher than the national average of 59.5%; with male literacy of 73% and female literacy of 54%. 13% of the population is under 6 years of age.

== Economy ==
Chakulia is famous for its detergent soap and powder manufactured by South East Chemical/Hindustan Soap Factory, Rice Mills and also known for bamboo.

== Transportation ==
Chakulia is connected by railway and road, and lies in the Howrah-Mumbai rail route. It is also among the major economic hubs which lie between Jamshedpur and Kharagpur. Trains and transport vehicles are easily available from major nearby cities, such as Kharagpur (West Bengal), Tatanagar (Jharkhand), Baripada (Orissa). Chakulia also has an airfield which was used heavily during the World War II.

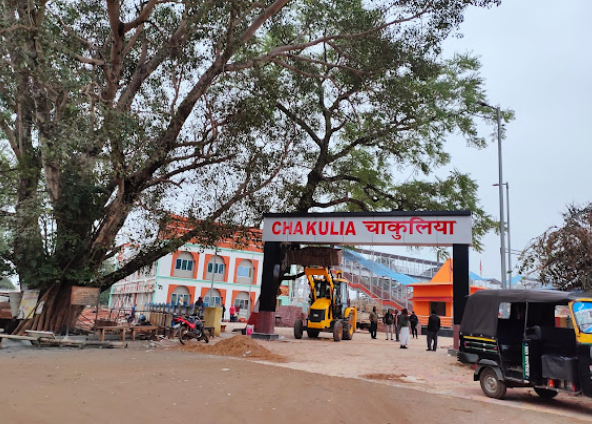
Chakulia Station Entrance

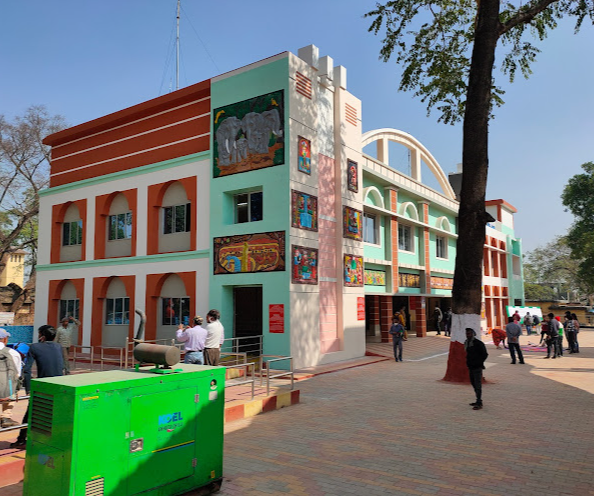
Chakulia Station Building

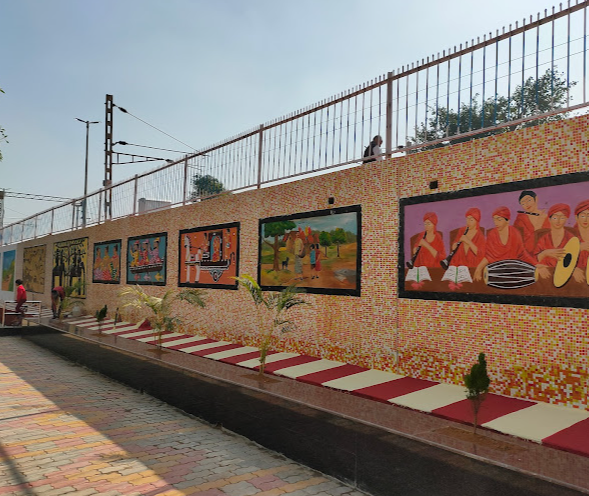
Chakulia Station Arts

== Education ==
Shibu Ranjan Khan Memorial Degree College was established at Chakuliya in 2010. There are lot of Schools in Chakulia area.

== Healthcare ==
- C.H.C, Chakulia.
- Anandlok Hospital, Chakulia.

== Tourist Places ==
- Chakulia Ecological & Biodiversity Park
