= Mohindra Kumar Ghosh =

Indian politician

Member of Parliament, Lok Sabha
- In office 1957–1962
- Succeeded by: Udaikar Mishra
- Constituency: Jamshedpur

Personal details
- Born: 1893 Dacca, Bengal Presidency, British India
- Died: 12 November 1982
- Party: Indian National Congress
- Spouse: Kamala

Mohindra Kumar Ghosh (1893-1982) was an Indian politician. He was a Member of Parliament, representing Jamshedpur in the Lok Sabha the lower house of India's Parliament as a member of the Indian National Congress.
