= Baharagora Assembly constituency =

Constituency of the Jharkhand legislative assembly in India

Coordinates: 22.28°N 86.72°E

Baharagora
- Constituency No. 44 for the Jharkhand Legislative Assembly

Constituency details
- Country: India
- Region: East India
- State: Jharkhand
- District: East Singhbhum
- Lok Sabha constituency: Jamshedpur
- Established: 2000
- Total electors: 2,25,068
- Reservation: None

Member of Legislative Assembly
- 6th Jharkhand Legislative Assembly
- Incumbent Samir Mohanty
- Party: JMM
- Alliance: MGB
- Elected year: 2024

Baharagora Assembly constituency is an assembly constituency in the Indian state of Jharkhand.

Most successful parties after separate Jharkhand state.
1. JMM (80.0%)
2. BJP (20.0%)

== Overview ==
According to the Delimitation of Parliamentary and Assembly Constituencies Order, 2008 of the Election Commission of India, Bahargora Assembly constituency covers Baharagora and Chakulia police stations. Baharagora (Vidhan Sabha constituency) is part of Jamshedpur (Lok Sabha constituency).

== Members of the Legislative Assembly ==
Election	Member	Party
Bihar Legislative Assembly
Before 1957: see Ghatsila cum Baharagora constituency
1957-62: Constituency did not exist
1962	Jhareswar Ghosh	Independent politician
1967	Shibu Ranjan Khan	Independent politician
1969	Shibu Ranjan Khan	Independent politician
1972	Shibu Ranjan Khan	Indian National Congress
1977	Bishna Pada Ghosh	Indian National Congress
1980	Devipada Upadhayay	Communist Party of India
1985	Devipada Upadhayay	Communist Party of India
1990	Devipada Upadhayay	Communist Party of India
1995	Devipada Upadhayay	Communist Party of India
2000	Dinesh Sarangi	Bharatiya Janata Party
Jharkhand Legislative Assembly
2005	Dinesh Sarangi	Bharatiya Janata Party
2009	Bidyut Baran Mahato	Jharkhand Mukti Morcha
2014	Kunal Sarangi	Jharkhand Mukti Morcha
2019	Samir Mohanty	Jharkhand Mukti Morcha
2024	Samir Mohanty	Jharkhand Mukti Morcha

== Election results ==
=== Assembly election 2024 ===
2024 Jharkhand Legislative Assembly election: Baharagora
Party	Candidate	Votes	%	±%
JMM	Samir Mohanty	96,870	50.65%	▼11.34
BJP	Dineshananda Goswami	78,745	41.17%	▲14.59
CPI(M)	Swapan Kumar Mahato	4,518	2.36%	▼2.41
Independent	Ram Murmu	2,644	1.38%	New
Independent	Phani Bhushan Mahato	1,625	0.85%	New
NOTA	None of the Above	2,495	1.30%	▲0.25
Margin of victory		18,125	9.48%	▼25.94
Turnout		1,91,264	79.73%	▲3.74
Registered electors		2,39,900		▲6.59
JMM hold		Swing	▼11.34	

=== Assembly election 2019 ===
2019 Jharkhand Legislative Assembly election: Baharagora
Party	Candidate	Votes	%	±%
JMM	Samir Mohanty	106,017	61.99%	▲26.22
BJP	Kunal Sarangi	45,452	26.58%	▲0.28
CPI(M)	Swapan Kumar Mahato	8,167	4.78%	▲1.89
CPI	Sanat Kumar Mahato	2,249	1.32%	▼1.77
Independent	Durgapada Ghosh	2,049	1.20%	New
NOTA	None of the Above	1,797	1.05%	▼0.55
Margin of victory		60,565	35.41%	▲25.94
Turnout		1,71,017	75.98%	▼0.02
Registered electors		2,25,068		▲5.53
JMM hold		Swing	▲26.22	

=== Assembly election 2014 ===
2014 Jharkhand Legislative Assembly election: Baharagora
Party	Candidate	Votes	%	±%
JMM	Kunal Sarangi	57,973	35.77%	▼7.32
BJP	Dineshananda Goswami	42,618	26.29%	▼4.31
JVM(P)	Samir Mohanty	42,130	25.99%	New
CPI	Sanat Kumar Mahato	5,007	3.09%	New
CPI(M)	Swapan Kumar Mahato	4,679	2.89%	▼1.55
INC	Debi Shankar Dutta	3,559	2.20%	▼4.48
SP	Dhirendra Nath Vera	1,265	0.78%	New
NOTA	None of the Above	2,591	1.60%	New
Margin of victory		15,355	9.47%	▼3.01
Turnout		1,62,080	76.00%	▼0.03
Registered electors		2,13,264		▲17.96
JMM hold		Swing	▼7.32	

=== Assembly election 2009 ===
2009 Jharkhand Legislative Assembly election: Baharagora
Party	Candidate	Votes	%	±%
JMM	Bidyut Baran Mahato	59,228	43.09%	▲7.49
BJP	Dinesh Sarangi	42,074	30.61%	▼7.43
AJSU	Samir Mohanty	11,465	8.34%	New
INC	Shyamal Kumar Khan	9,180	6.68%	New
CPI(M)	Swapan Kumar Mahato	6,098	4.44%	▼3.25
AITC	Saroj Kumar Mahapatra	2,739	1.99%	New
Independent	Dhirendra Nath Bera	2,676	1.95%	New
Margin of victory		17,154	12.48%	▲10.05
Turnout		1,37,462	76.03%	▲2.73
Registered electors		1,80,792		▼2.61
JMM gain from BJP		Swing	▲5.05	

=== Assembly election 2005 ===
2005 Jharkhand Legislative Assembly election: Baharagora
Party	Candidate	Votes	%	±%
BJP	Dinesh Sarangi	51,753	38.03%	▲10.80
JMM	Vidyut Varan Mahato	48,441	35.60%	▲9.54
CPI(M)	Swapan Kumar Mahato	10,459	7.69%	▲4.90
Independent	Samir Mohanty	9,411	6.92%	New
CPI	Rabindra Nath Das	9,043	6.65%	▼13.10
Independent	Sarala Mahato	2,515	1.85%	New
Independent	Murari Mohan Mahato	1,338	0.98%	New
Margin of victory		3,312	2.43%	▲1.26
Turnout		1,36,068	73.30%	▲4.69
Registered electors		1,85,629		▲14.92
BJP hold		Swing	▲10.80	

=== Assembly election 2000 ===
2000 Bihar Legislative Assembly election: Baharagora
Party	Candidate	Votes	%	±%
BJP	Dinesh Sarangi	30,186	27.24%	New
JMM	Bidyut Baran Mahato	28,885	26.06%	New
INC	Devipada Upadhyay	24,722	22.31%	New
CPI	Rabindra Nath Das	21,888	19.75%	New
CPI(M)	Dibakar Mardi	3,092	2.79%	New
Independent	Bhut Nath Patra	1,375	1.24%	New
Margin of victory		1,301	1.17%	
Turnout		1,10,828	69.30%	
Registered electors		1,61,523		
BJP win (new seat)				

== See also ==
- Vidhan Sabha
- List of states of India by type of legislature
