= Vinod Kumar Binny =

Indian politician

Member (MLA) of Delhi Legislative Assembly
- In office 2013–2015
- Preceded by: Ashok Kumar Walia
- Succeeded by: Nitin Tyagi
- Constituency: Laxmi Nagar

Personal details
- Born: 1973 (age 52–53)
- Party: Bharatiya Janata Party (2015-Present)
- Other political affiliations: Aam Aadmi Party (2013–2014)

Vinod Kumar Binny (born 1973) is an Indian politician and was an MLA from Laxmi Nagar in Delhi.

He was member of Aam Aadmi Party (AAP) from 2013 to 2014, and joined Bharatiya Janata Party (BJP) in 2015.

== Political career ==
Before joining AAP in 2013, Binny twice contested election as an independent candidate and won both times. During the 2013 Delhi Legislative Assembly elections, he was elected as an MLA from Laxmi Nagar constituency. He had defeated Ashok Kumar Walia of Indian National Congress by around 8,000 votes. In December 2013, he had walked out of a meeting in which the AAP decided its members for the cabinet, but was reportedly talked out of escalating the crisis. In January 2014, Binny accused the AAP of betraying people of Delhi and straying from principles. On 26 January 2014, he was expelled from AAP in a disciplinary action and his primary membership of the party was terminated. He moved to Delhi High Court seeking protection of his MLA rights and for continuing as an independent legislator.

Before 2015 Delhi Legislative Assembly election, he joined BJP on 18 January 2015 and contested from Patparganj. He lost against his former colleague from Aam Aadmi Party, Manish Sisodia by a margin of 28,761 votes.
