= Bidyut Baran Mahato =

Indian politician (born 1963)

- বিদ্যুৎ বরণ মাহাতো
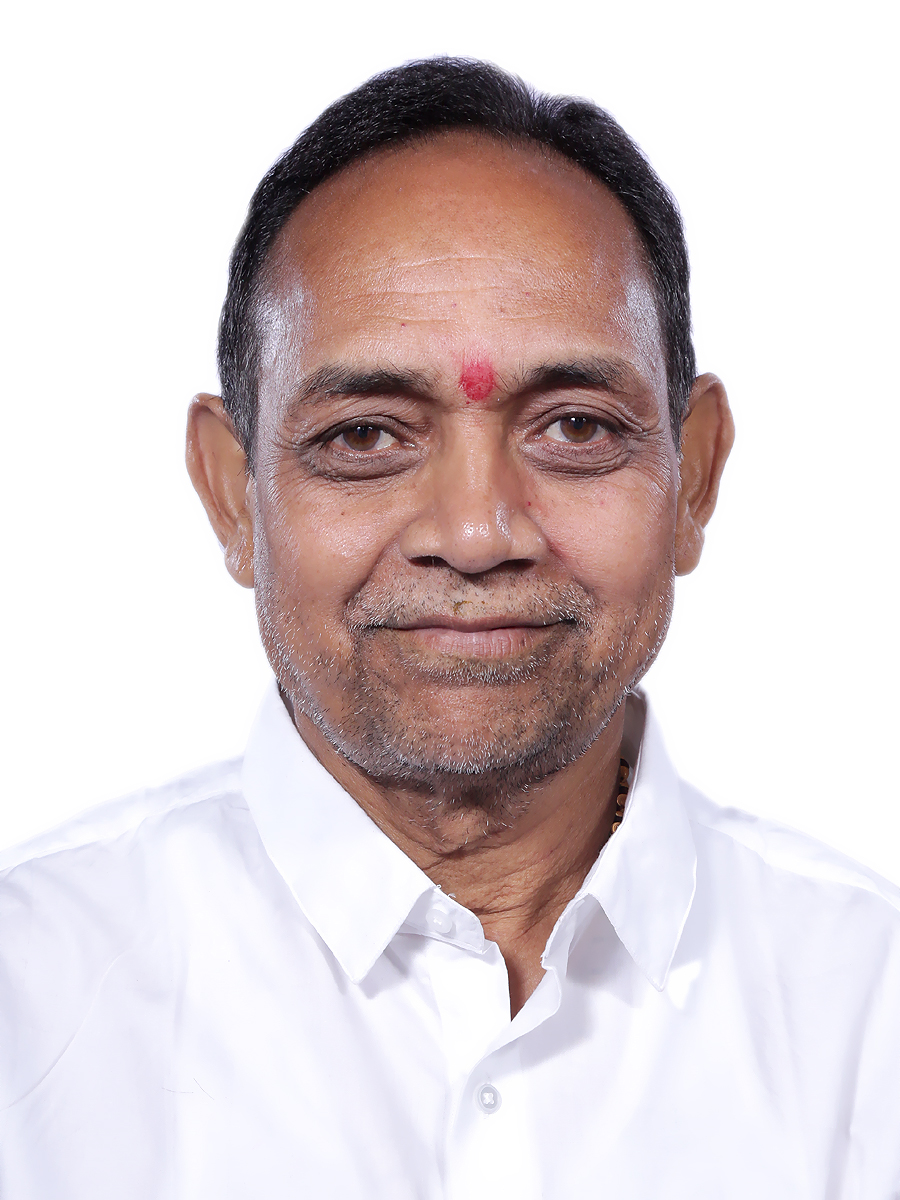
- Official Portrait of Bidyut Baran Mahato

Member of Parliament, Lok Sabha
- Incumbent
- Assumed office 16 May 2014
- Preceded by: Ajoy Kumar
- Constituency: Jamshedpur

Member of the Jharkhand Legislative Assembly
- In office 2009–2014
- Preceded by: Dinesh Sarangi
- Succeeded by: Kunal Sarangi
- Constituency: Baharagora

Personal details
- Born: 15 February 1963 (age 63) Krishnapur, Jharkhand, India
- Party: Bharatiya Janata Party (2014–present)
- Other political affiliations: Jharkhand Mukti Morcha (till 2014)
- Spouse: Smt. Usha Mahato (m.13 May 1992)
- Children: 2
- Parent(s): Surendra Mahato, Suhsila Mahato
- Occupation: Agriculturist
- Website: Official Website

Bidyut Baran Mahato (Hindi pronunciation: [bɪd̪jʊt̪ bəɾən̪ mɛɦt̪oː]) is an Indian politician and a member of parliament to the 16th Lok Sabha from Jamshedpur (Lok Sabha constituency), Jharkhand. He won the 2014 Indian general election being a Bharatiya Janata Party candidate. He also won the Lok Sabha Elections held in May 2019. He became the first candidate from Jamshedpur Lok Sabha Constituency to win the Lok Sabha Election held in May 2024 three times consecutively.

== Early life and education ==
Bidyut Baran Mahato was born in Krishnapur on 15 February 1963 in a Bengali Kudmi Mahato family. He completed is Education from Tata College, Chaibasa. He was farmer by occupation and one time MLA from Baharagora and three times MP from Jamshedpur.

== Positions held ==
Bidyut Baran Mahato has held various positions in the Indian government and legislative bodies. He was elected to the 18th Lok Sabha in June 2024. Since 26 September 2024, he has been a member of the Committee on Coal, Mines and Steel. Additionally, from 16 August 2024, he became a member of the Committee on Welfare of Other Backward Classes. He is also a member of the Consultative Committee for the Ministry of Steel.

Before his current tenure in the 18th Lok Sabha, Mahato was re-elected to the 17th Lok Sabha in May 2019, serving a second term. He was a member of the Standing Committee on Industry from 13 September 2019. Between 1 September 2014 and 25 May 2019, he served as a member of the Standing Committee on Industry, as well as a member of the Consultative Committee for the Ministry of Steel and Mines. He was first elected to the 16th Lok Sabha in May 2014.

Earlier in his career, Mahato was the Chairman of the Committee on Public Undertakings in the Jharkhand Legislative Assembly from 2012 to 2014. He had also served as a member of the Jharkhand Legislative Assembly from 2010 to 2014.

== See also ==
- Kudmi Mahato Community
