= Dinesh Sarangi =

Indian politician

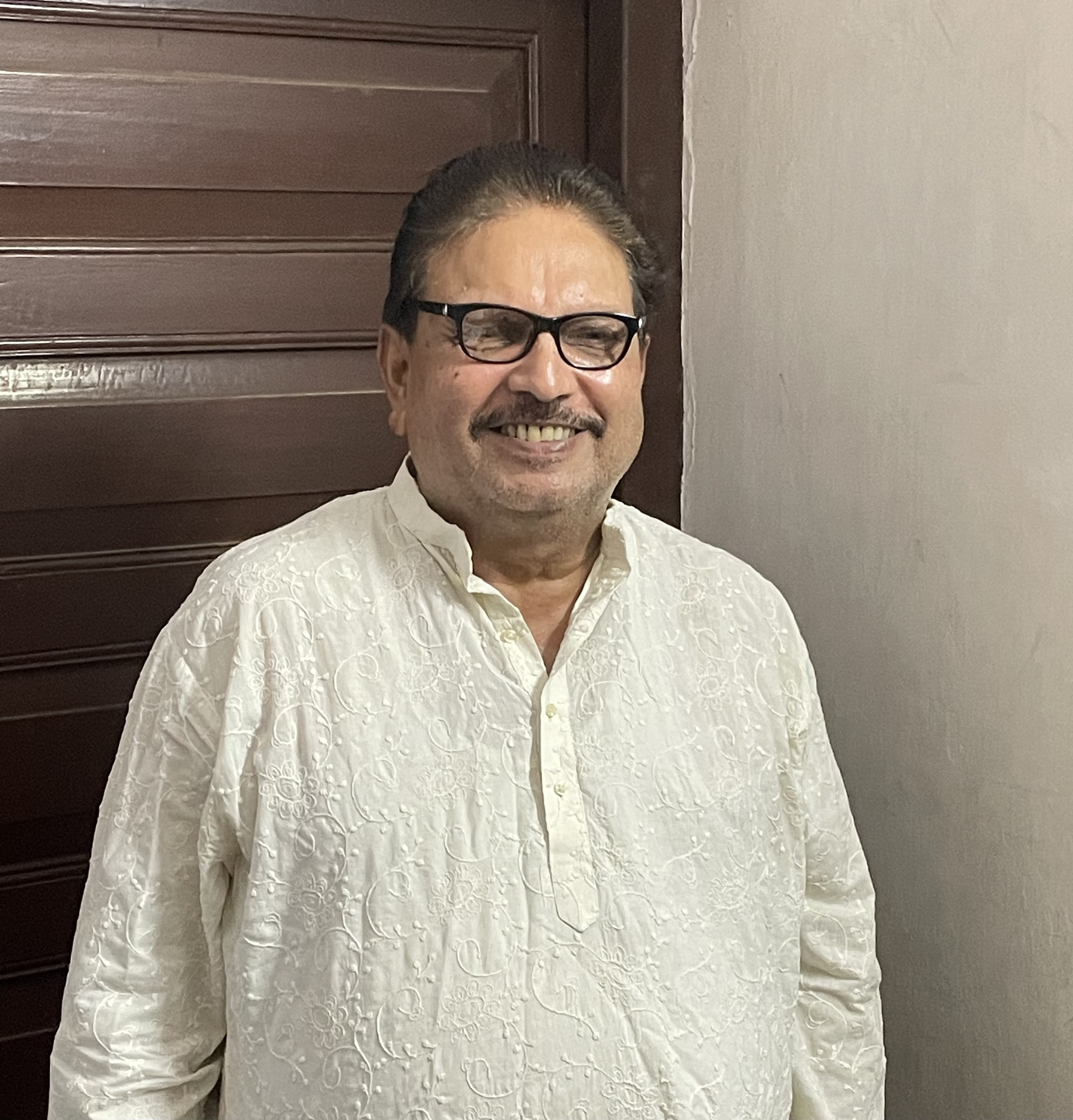
- Born: Baharagora, Jharkhand, India
- Occupation: Politician
- Years active: 2000–2005
- Organization: Bharatiya Janata party
- Known for: Political and Social activities
- Spouse: Bini Sarangi
- Children: Konark Sarangi And Kunal Sarangi

Dinesh Sarangi is an Indian politician. He was member of the Bharatiya Janata Party. Sarangi was a member of the Jharkhand Legislative Assembly from the Baharagora constituency in East Singhbhum district. Sarangi was State Health Minister between 2000 and 2005.
