= Laxmi Nagar Assembly constituency =

Constituency of the Delhi legislative assembly in India

Coordinates: 28.64°N 77.27°E

Laxmi Nagar
- Constituency No. 58 for the Delhi Legislative Assembly

Constituency details
- Country: India
- Region: North India
- State: Delhi
- District: East Delhi
- Established: 2008
- Reservation: None

Member of Legislative Assembly
- 8th Delhi Legislative Assembly
- Incumbent Abhay Verma
- Party: BJP
- Elected year: 2025

Laxmi Nagar Assembly constituency is one of the 70 legislative assembly constituencies of Delhi in northern India. Laxmi Nagar assembly constituency is a part of East Delhi (Lok Sabha constituency). The constituency was created by reorganization by the Delimitation Commission of India in 2022.

== Members of Legislative Assembly ==
Election	Member	Party
2008	Ashok Kumar Walia	Indian National Congress
2013	Vinod Kumar Binny	Aam Aadmi Party
2015	Nitin Tyagi	Aam Aadmi Party
2020	Abhay Verma	Bharatiya Janata Party
2025	Abhay Verma	Bharatiya Janata Party

== Election results ==
=== 2025 ===
Delhi Assembly elections, 2025: Laxmi Nagar
Party	Candidate	Votes	%	±%
BJP	Abhay Verma	65,858	52.11	
AAP	B. B. Tyagi	54,316	42.97	
INC	Sumit Sharma	4316	3.41	
NOTA	None of the above	686		
Majority		11,542		
Turnout		1,26,382		
BJP hold		Swing		

=== 2020 ===
Delhi Assembly elections, 2020: Laxmi Nagar
Party	Candidate	Votes	%	±%
BJP	Abhay Verma	65,735	48.04	+9.04
AAP	Nitin Tyagi	64,855	47.40	+4.86
INC	Hari Dutt Sharma	4,872	3.56	−13.70
NOTA	None of the above	550	0.40	+0.10
BSP	Jai Ram Lal	446	0.33	−0.17
RRP	Anima Ojha	78	0.06	N/A
Majority		880	0.64	−2.90
Turnout		1,36,944	61.74	−5.49
BJP gain from AAP		Swing	+6.13	

=== 2015 ===
Delhi Assembly elections, 2015: Laxmi Nagar
Party	Candidate	Votes	%	±%
AAP	Nitin Tyagi	58,229	42.54	+6.13
BJP	B. B. Tyagi	53,383	39.00	+10.37
INC	Dr. Ashok Kumar Walia	23,627	17.26	−12.59
BSP	Kavita Narain	687	0.50	−0.58
NOTA	None of the above	420	0.30	−0.17
Majority		4,846	3.54	−3.02
Turnout		1,36,959	67.23	
AAP hold		Swing	+9.04	

=== 2013 ===
Delhi Assembly elections, 2013: Laxmi Nagar
Party	Candidate	Votes	%	±%
AAP	Vinod Kumar Binny	43,052	36.41	
INC	Dr. Ashok Kumar Walia	35,300	29.85	−29.73
BJP	Abhay Kumar Verma	33,849	28.63	+3.81
Independent	Mohammed Naeem	3,410	2.88	
BSP	Mool Chand	1,275	1.08	−2.79
New All India Congress Party	Vikram Nijhawan	183	0.15	
SP	Dushyant Nagar	136	0.12	−0.21
Independent	Amit Mall	119	0.10	
NOTA	None	562	0.47	
Majority		7,752	6.56	−18.03
Turnout		118,314	64.70	
AAP gain from INC		Swing		

=== 2008 ===
Delhi Assembly elections, 2008: Laxmi Nagar
Party	Candidate	Votes	%	±%
INC	Dr. Ashok Kumar Walia	54,252	59.58	
BJP	Murari Singh Panwar	31,855	34.99	
BSP	Avinash Sharma	3,527	3.87	
Independent	Yashoda Rani	374	0.41	
SP	Omvir Singh Yadav	305	0.33	
RLD	Raju Prasad Gupta	257	0.28	
Independent	Gulzar Ahmad	168	0.18	
UPUDF	Kanta	125	0.14	
Independent	Om Prakash Singh	97	0.11	
JD(U)	Vinay Kumar Sharma	90	0.10	
Majority		22,397	24.59	
Turnout		91,051	56.5	
INC win (new seat)				
