= Nitin Tyagi =

Indian politician

MLA, Sixth Legislative Assembly of Delhi
- In office 11 February 2015 – 11 February 2020
- Preceded by: Vinod Kumar Binny
- Succeeded by: Abhay Verma
- Constituency: Laxmi Nagar

Personal details
- Born: 16 June 1973 (age 53) Meerut, Uttar Pradesh, India
- Party: Bharatiya Janata Party (2024–present); Aam Admi Party (until 2024)
- Children: Puja Tyagi, Aprajita Tyagi and Sanya Tyagi
- Parent: K. D. Sharma (father) Pratibha Sharma (mother)
- Education: Institute of Management Technology, Ghaziabad
- Profession: Politician & businessperson

Nitin Tyagi (born 16 June 1973) is an Indian politician and member of the Sixth Legislative Assembly of Delhi in India. He represented the Laxmi Nagar constituency of Delhi and was a member of the Aam Aadmi Party until he was suspended for anti-party activities on 7 June 2024.

== Early life and education ==
Nitin Tyagi was born in Meerut. He attended the Institute of Management Technology, Ghaziabad and completed Post Graduate Diploma in Management.

== Political career ==
Nitin Tyagi was ab MLA from 2015. He represented the Laxmi Nagar constituency and is a member of the Aam Aadmi Party.

== Posts held ==
#	From	To	Position	Comments
01	Feb. 2015		Member, Sixth Legislative Assembly of Delhi	
02	Nov. 2020		Member, DCPCR	

== See also ==
- Aam Aadmi Party
- Delhi Legislative Assembly
- Laxmi Nagar (Delhi Assembly constituency)
- Politics of India
- Sixth Legislative Assembly of Delhi
