= Kunal Sarangi =

Indian politician

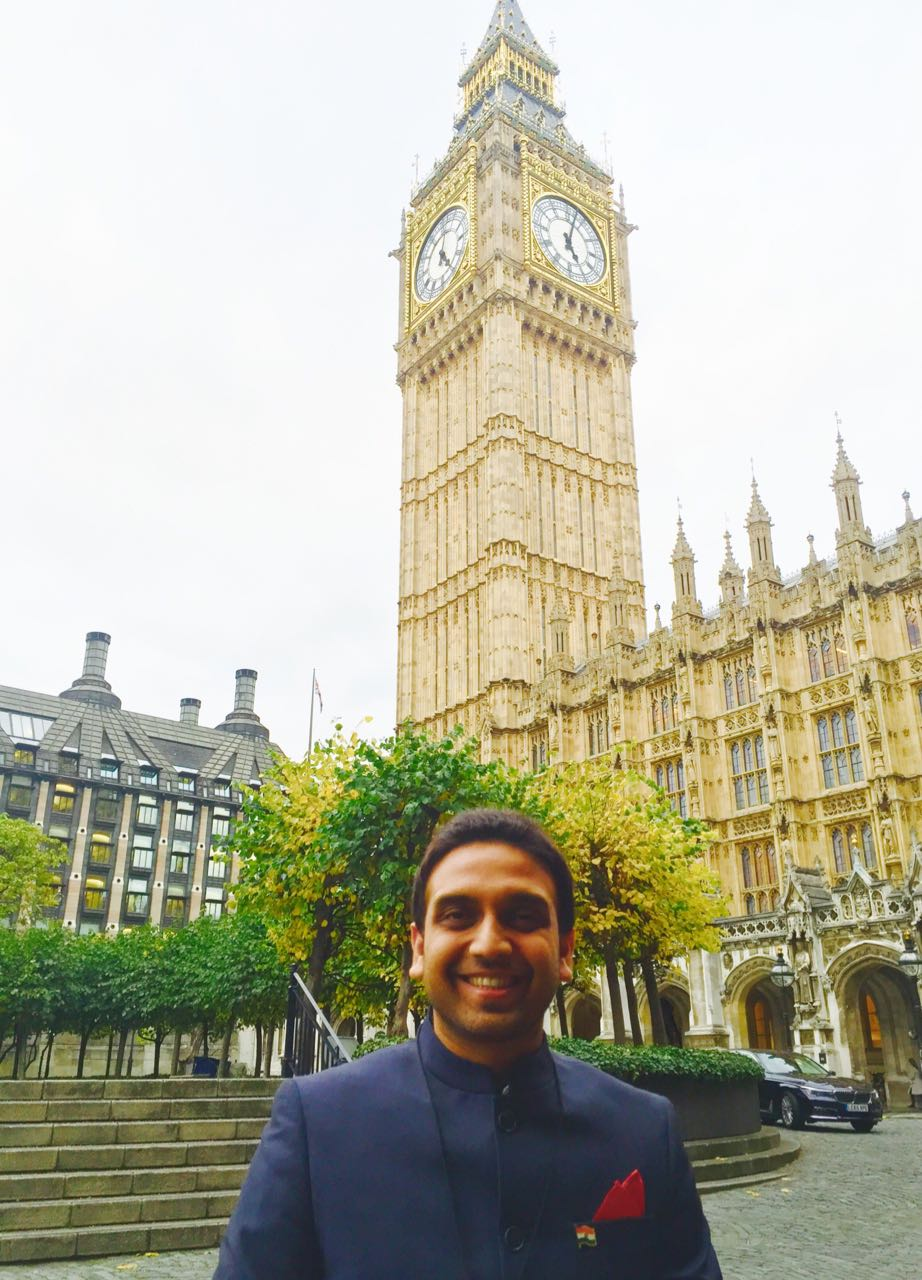
- Kunal Sarangi in London, 2016

Jharkhand

Member of the Jharkhand Legislative Assembly
- In office 2014–2019
- Preceded by: Bidyut Baran Mahato
- Succeeded by: Samir Mohanty
- Constituency: Baharagora

Personal details
- Born: 3 January 1981 (age 45)
- Other political affiliations: Jharkhand Mukti Morcha
- Parent: Dinesh Sarangi (father)
- Education: NIT Jamshedpur; Lancaster University
- Profession: Politician

Kunal Sarangi is an Indian politician from the state of Jharkhand. He joined Jharkhand mukti morcha Party in 2024 for the Indian state of Jharkhand. He was a former member of the Jharkhand Legislative Assembly from Baharagora from 2014 to 2019, whip and was also the former central spokesperson of the ruling party Jharkhand Mukti Morcha and member of the Public Accounts Committee (PAC) of the Jharkhand Legislative Assembly. He joined Bharatiya Janata Party in September 2019.

He represented Jharkhand Legislative Assembly in CPA conference, Goa, Whips's conference in Vizag and Udaipur, and National Legislature Conference in New Delhi.

== Education ==
Kunal did his schooling in Baharagora from Sharaswati Sishu Vidya Mandir, Baharagora and later graduated from National Institute of Technology (NIT), Jamshedpur. He finished his MBA from Lancaster University Management School (LUMS), United Kingdom and also attended Harvard University for an executive program on leadership. He was also one of the 12 young Indian political leaders selected for a study tour of Great Britain organized by the British High Commission in 2016.

== Recognition ==
He was honoured with the 'Ideal Youth MLA award' in 2016 by MIT, Pune in one of the largest Students' conferences - Bharatiya Chhatra Sansad ( BCS). He is the first MLA from Jharkhand to get this award.

He represented Jharkhand Legislative Assembly in the National CPA conference (2016) in Goa, National Whips' conference (2017) in Vizag and National Whips' conference (2018) in Udaipur, and National Legislature Conference (2018 ) in New Delhi.

He was also chosen for the 'International Visitor Leadership Program- 2018', one of US Government's most prestigious professional exchange programs for international opinion leaders. He is the first ever legislator of Jharkhand to be selected for this internationally recognised program in Washington DC. During his time at IVLP, he actively engaged with his counterparts and exchanged views on contemporary political and socio-economic scenario in Jharkhand. Kunal was also chosen as a goodwill brand ambassador of Arkansas state by Asa Hutchinson, Governor of Arkansas & Mark Martin, Secretary of State of Arkansas. In February 2019, Harvard University invited him to speak at the India Conference 2019 on the relevance of 'Regional political parties in Indian politics and their role as king-makers or game-changers'.

Early in 2019, he also collaborated with UNICEF India to champion its Child Reporters Initiative in Baharagora to make it a Child-Marriage Free Assembly constituency. He has been actively encouraging young school students, local elected representatives and other grassroots organisations in Baharagora to join the programme and bring effective changes in their community and families. UNICEF has also decided to actively work with Kunal to successfully implement Generation Unlimited, a youth skills programme to ensure an effective transition for the youth in Baharagora from education to employment.
