= Ajoy Kumar =

Indian politician

President, Jharkhand Pradesh Congress Committee
- In office 16 November 2017 – 10 August 2019
- Succeeded by: Rameshwar Oraon

Member of Parliament, Lok Sabha
- In office 2011–2014
- Preceded by: Arjun Munda, BJP
- Succeeded by: Bidyut Baran Mahato, BJP
- Constituency: Jamshedpur

AICC incharge of Odisha Pradesh Congress Committee & Additional incharge of Tamil Nadu & Puducherry
- In office 24 December 2023 – 14 February 2025
- Preceded by: Odisha -A. Chellakumar; Tamil Nadu & Puducherry - Dinesh Gundu Rao
- Succeeded by: Odisha -Ajay Kumar Lallu; Tamilnadu & Puducherry - Girish Chodankar

Personal details
- Born: 10 August 1964 (age 62) Mangalore, Mysore State, India
- Party: Indian National Congress (2014–2019) & ( 2020 – Present)
- Other political affiliations: Aam Aadmi Party (2019–2020); Jharkhand Vikas Morcha (Prajatantrik) (2010—2014)
- Spouse: Reena Arya
- Children: 2
- Education: Jawaharlal Institute of Postgraduate Medical Education and Research, Puducherry
- Awards: Youngest IPS to Receive President's Police Medal in Gallantry
- As of 3 February, 2012 Source: [Lok Sabha]

Ajoy Kumar is a former Indian Police Service (IPS) officer, who served in the 15th Lok Sabha as an MP for Jamshedpur. He is the AICC (All India Congress Committee) In-charge of 3 states namely Tripura Pradesh Congress Committee, Nagaland Pradesh Congress Committee, Odisha Pradesh Congress Committee and Sikkim Pradesh Congress Committee. He is a member of the CWC (Congress Working Committee). He is also the National Spokesperson of Indian National Congress. He was also the former President of Jharkhand Pradesh Congress Committee.

== Political career ==
He was elected as the member of 15th Lok Sabha, from the Jamshedpur Lok Sabha constituency in a mid-term election. He belongs to Jharkhand Vikas Morcha (Prajatantrik) (JVM) party, during the 2011 Jamshedpur by-elections held on 1 July 2011, the result for the same was announced on 4 July. He defeated his nearest rival, Dineshanand Goswami of BJP, by a margin of over 1.55 lakh votes. JVM is led by the former chief minister of Jharkhand, Babulal Marandi. A former IPS officer of 1986 batch, Kumar served as the superintendent of Police in Jamshedpur (1994–96), after which he left the police service and joined Tata Motors as a senior executive.

In 2014, he lost the election for the 16th Lok Sabha from Jamshedpur by a margin of almost 100,000 votes to BJP candidate, Bidyut Baran Mahato.

He joined Indian National Congress on 23 August 2014. After much speculation on nomination for Member of Parliament (MP) of Rajya Sabha (Upper House), he was appointed the National Spokesperson for the Congress party on 26 September 2014.

He was appointed president of Congress party in Jharkhand (JPCC) on 16 November 2017.

He joined Aam Aadmi Party on 19 September 2019 in Delhi party headquarters in presence of Senior Leaders of Party Manish Sisodia, Saurabh Bharadwaj and Durgesh Pathak. On 27 September 2020 Ajoy Kumar quits Aam Aadmi Party and rejoined Congress.

He was appointed the AICC incharge for 3 North Eastern states (Tripura, Nagaland, Sikkim) in August 2021. He was subsequently appointed the member of Congress Working Committee (CWC).

In 2022, he was the first and only leader from Jharkhand to be appointed the member of newly formed AICC Steering committee by the newly elected Congress President Mallikarjun Kharge.

== Early life and administrative career ==
Dr. Ajoy Kumar was born as Ajay Kumar Bhandary in Mangalore to Vathsala and K.S. Bhandary. His mother tongue is Tulu language. He did his schooling from Hyderabad Public School. Kumar has also served Jamshedpur as an IPS officer (1986–1996). He was the city SP from the year 1994 to 1996, during which he was termed by the media as an encounter specialist. Before this Kumar was assigned as the SP of Jamshedpur, he was serving as the city SP of Patna. During the 1990s Jamshedpur was ruled by local "goons", and crime was at a peak in the city, when the chief minister of Bihar Lalu Prasad Yadav, on request of the Tata Steel MD J. J. Irani, sent Kumar as the city Superintendent of Police in 1994. In a short time he was successful in controlling and decreasing the crime rate in Jamshedpur.

== Education ==
Kumar obtained his MBBS in 1985, from Jawaharlal Institute of Postgraduate Medical Education and Research in Puducherry.
