= Sanjib Sardar =

Indian politician

Member of the Jharkhand Legislative Assembly
- Incumbent
- Assumed office 2019
- Preceded by: Maneka Sardar
- Constituency: Potka

Personal details
- Party: Jharkhand Mukti Morcha
- Parent: Nalin Sardar (father)
- Education: I.A.(2009)
- Occupation: Social Service, Politician

Sanjib Sardar is an Indian politician and member of the Jharkhand Mukti Morcha. Sardar is a member of the Jharkhand Legislative Assembly from the Potka constituency in Purbi Singhbhum district.

== Political career ==
In the 2019 Jharkhand Legislative Assembly election, Sanjib contested from Potka Assembly constituency as a Jharkhand Mukti Morcha candidate. In this election, he got a total of 110,753 votes and was elected to the 5th Jharkhand Legislative Assembly. He defeated his nearest rival Maneka Sardar of the Bharatiya Janata Party by 43,110 votes. He has been serving in this assembly since 2019.

== See also ==
- Maneka Sardar
- Amulya Sardar
- Sanatan Sardar
