= Jamshedpur Lok Sabha constituency =

Constituency of the Indian parliament in Jharkhand

Coordinates: 22.80°N 86.19°E

Jharkhand JH-9
- Lok Sabha constituency
- Interactive map of Jamshedpur Lok Sabha constituency

Constituency details
- Country: India
- Region: East India
- State: Jharkhand
- District: East Singhbhum
- Assembly constituencies: Baharagora; Ghatsila; Potka; Jugsalai; Jamshedpur East; Jamshedpur West
- Established: 1952
- Reservation: None

Member of Parliament
- 18th Lok Sabha
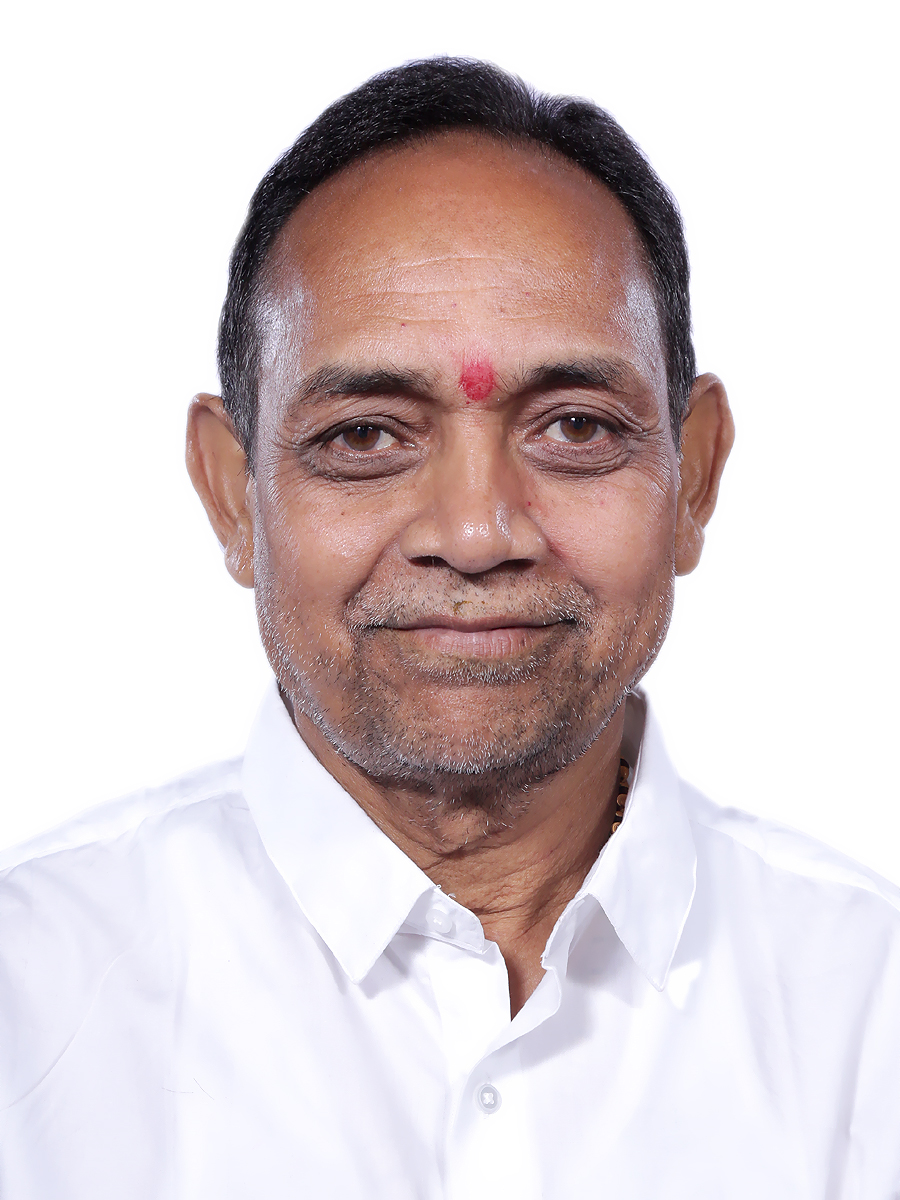
- Incumbent Bidyut Baran Mahato
- Party: BJP
- Alliance: NDA
- Elected year: 2024

Jamshedpur Lok Sabha constituency is one of the 14 Lok Sabha (parliamentary) constituencies in Jharkhand state in eastern India. This constituency covers the entire East Singhbhum district.

== Assembly segments ==
Presently, Jamshedpur Lok Sabha constituency comprises the following six Vidhan Sabha (legislative assembly) segments:

#	Name	District	Member	Party	2024 Lead
44	Baharagora	East Singhbhum	Samir Mohanty	JMM	BJP
45	Ghatsila (ST)	East Singhbhum	Somesh Chandra Soren	JMM	BJP
46	Potka (ST)	East Singhbhum	Sanjib Sardar	JMM	BJP
47	Jugsalai (SC)	East Singhbhum	Mangal Kalindi	JMM	BJP
48	Jamshedpur East	East Singhbhum	Purnima Sahu	BJP	BJP
49	Jamshedpur West	East Singhbhum	Saryu Roy	JD(U)	BJP

== Members of Parliament ==
Year	Name	Party
1957	Mohindra Kumar Ghosh	Indian National Congress
1962	Udaikar Mishra	Communist Party of India
1967	S. C. Prasad	Indian National Congress
1971	Sardar Swaran Singh Sokhi	Indian National Congress
1977	Rudra Pratap Sarangi	Janata Party
1980	Rudra Pratap Sarangi	Janata Party
1984	Gopeshwar	Indian National Congress
1989	Shailendra Mahato	Jharkhand Mukti Morcha
1991	Shailendra Mahato	Jharkhand Mukti Morcha
1996	Nitish Bharadwaj	Bharatiya Janata Party
1998	Abha Mahato	Bharatiya Janata Party
1999	Abha Mahato	Bharatiya Janata Party
2004	Sunil Mahato	Jharkhand Mukti Morcha
2007^	Suman Mahato	Jharkhand Mukti Morcha
2009	Arjun Munda	Bharatiya Janata Party
2011^	Ajoy Kumar	Jharkhand Vikas Morcha
2014	Bidyut Baran Mahato	Bharatiya Janata Party
2019	Bidyut Baran Mahato	Bharatiya Janata Party
2024	Bidyut Baran Mahato	Bharatiya Janata Party

== Election results ==
=== 2024 ===
2024 Indian general election: Jamshedpur
Party	Candidate	Votes	%	±%
BJP	Bidyut Baran Mahato	726,174	56.84	−2.56
JMM	Samir Mohanty	466,392	36.50	+3.50
Independent	Indra Deo Prasad	8,469	0.66	−
BSP	Pranav Kumar Mahto	6,151	0.48	−
RRP	Mahesh Kumar	1960	0.15	▲−
NOTA	None of the above	7,326	0.57	−
Majority		2,59,782	20.34	−6.06
Turnout		12,79,236	68.36	
BJP hold		Swing		

=== 2019 ===
2019 Indian general elections: Jamshedpur
Party	Candidate	Votes	%	±%
BJP	Bidyut Baran Mahato	679,632	59.40	+15.16
JMM	Champai Soren	377,542	33.00	+19.84
AITC	Anjana Mahato	9,518	0.83	−
AMB	Angad Mahato	6,665	0.58	−0.44
RRP	Mahesh Kumar	2,481	0.22	−
Majority		3,02,090	26.4	+16.88
Turnout		11,44,427	67.19	+0.86
BJP hold		Swing	16.88	

=== 2014 ===
2014 Indian general elections: Jamshedpur
Party	Candidate	Votes	%	±%
BJP	Bidyut Baran Mahato	464,153	44.24	+27.91
JVM(P)	Dr. Ajoy Kumar	364,277	34.72	−2.66
JMM	Niroop Mahanty	138,109	13.16	−2.49
AMB	Angad Mahato	12,632	1.20	
AAP	Kumar Chandra Mardi	7,145	0.68	
NOTA	None of the Above	15,629	1.49	
Majority		99,876	9.52	
Turnout		10,49,140	66.33	
BJP gain from JVM(P)		Swing		

=== 2011 By-election ===
Bye-election, 2011: Jamshedpur
Party	Candidate	Votes	%	±%
JVM(P)	Dr. Ajoy Kumar	276,582	37.38	
BJP	Dineshanand Goswami	120,856	16.33	
JMM	Sudhir Mahato	115,799	15.65	
AJSU	Astik Mahato	99,058	13.39	
INC	Banna Gupta	49,137	6.64	
CPI	S. K. Ghoshal	12,646	1.71	
Majority		1,55,726	21.05	
Turnout		7,40,003	52.94	+1.82
JVM(P) gain from BJP		Swing		

=== 2009 ===
2009 Indian general elections: Jamshedpur
Party	Candidate	Votes	%	±%
BJP	Arjun Munda	319,620	45.30	
JMM	Suman Mahato	199,957	28.34	
JVM(P)	Arvind Kumar Singh	79,089	11.21	
AJSU	Shailendra Mahato	37,400	5.30	
Majority		1,19,663	16.96	
Turnout		7,05,568	51.12	
BJP gain from JMM		Swing		

== See also ==
- East Singhbhum district
- List of constituencies of the Lok Sabha
