= Samir Mohanty (Jharkhand politician) =

Indian politician

Member of the Jharkhand Legislative Assembly
- Incumbent
- Assumed office 2019
- Preceded by: Kunal Sarangi
- Constituency: Baharagora

Personal details
- Born: 21 April 1971 (age 55) Bend, Chakulia. Jharkhand
- Party: Jharkhand Mukti Morcha
- Spouse: Sachala Mohanty
- Education: Bachelor of Commerce
- Occupation: Politician

Samir Kumar Mohanty is an Indian politician from the state of Jharkhand who is a Member of the Jharkhand Legislative Assembly, representing the Baharagora constituency. A member of the Jharkhand Mukti Morcha party, he was elected in the 2019 Jharkhand election by 60,565 votes.

== Education ==
Samir completed his primary schooling in his native village of Bend, Chakulia. He attended Manoharlal Government High School for his matriculation and later graduated from Ghatshila College, Ghatshila.

== Career ==
Mohanty commenced his political journey with the Jharkhand Mukti Morcha (JMM) party and ran for the 2014 elections on a JVM ticket from the Baharagora assembly seat in Jharkhand. Following the elections, he switched to the BJP. In 2019, Mohanty returned to the JMM, characterizing his comeback as a "homecoming" after "14 years of exile."

In the 2019 Jharkhand Legislative Assembly election, Samir contested from Baharagora Assembly constituency as a Jharkhand Mukti Morcha candidate. In this election, he got a total of 106,017 votes and was elected to the 5th Jharkhand Legislative Assembly. He defeated his nearest rival Kunal Sarangi of the Bharatiya Janata Party by 60,565 votes. He has been serving in this assembly since 2019.
