= Right to Recall Party =

Political party in India

- Abbreviation: RRP
- President: Rahul Chimanbhai Mehta
- Secretary: Rameshwar Lal Jat
- Treasurer: Mukeshbhai Desai
- Founder: Rahul Chimanbhai Mehta, Pawan Kumar Sharma and others
- Founded: 25 March 2019
- Headquarters: F-001-A, Supath-2 complex, Wadaj Bus Stand, Ahmedabad,Gujarat
- Colours: Yellow
- ECI status: Registered Unrecognized Political Party
- Seats in Rajya Sabha: 0 / 245
- Seats in Lok Sabha: 0 / 543
- Seats in State Legislative Assemblies: 0 / 4,036

Election symbol
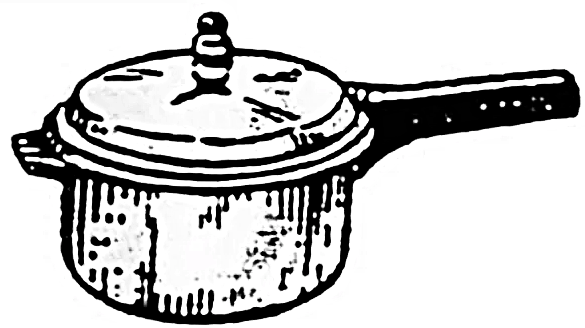

The Right to Recall Party (RRP) is a registered unrecognised political party (RUPP) in India, founded with the primary objective of the implementation of Right to Recall Laws in India, allowing citizens to recall elected representatives and officials before the completion of their term. It is headquartered in Ahmedabad, Gujarat, India.

== History ==
The Right to Recall Party was founded in 2019 by Rahul Chimanbhai Mehta, who is the son of former central minister Chimanbhai Mehta and worked as a software engineer in the United States and Britain for a decade. During his experiences in the United States and Britain, he observed that public services were accessible without the fear of bribery. Motivated by this, he returned to India in 1998 with the aim of promoting a similar system of accountability through recall laws. He started running a non registered organisation called Right to Recall Group in 2006. He and his organisation members decided to take participation in the election to promote laws of Right to Recall in India, so they decided to form a political party. The party was registered with the Election Commission of India, enabling it to contest elections at various levels.The party contested its first election in 2019 as general election of Lok Sabha. Only 14 candidate contested and all lost their deposits.

== Organisation ==
The party leadership consists of the following bodies:

National President: Rahul Chimanbhai Mehta

National Vice President: Amit Upadhyay

National Secretary: Rameshwar Jat

National Secretary: Bhatt Sunilkumar Narendrabhai

National Treasurer: Mukeshbhai Desai

=== State Leadership ===
The state leadership of the party manages the state wings.

== Activities and Recognition ==
Beside contesting election and campaigning for agenda, the party has raised concerns about the reliability of Electronic Voting Machines (EVMs) and Voter Verified Paper Audit Trail (VVPAT) systems. Mehta, the party’s founder, developed a model to demonstrate how EVMs and VVPATs could potentially be manipulated. According to him, if programmed with malicious intent, the machines can display the correct symbol on the VVPAT screen while printing slips or recording votes in favor of a different, pre-set candidate. He highlighted the introduction of black-tinted glass in 2017 and the reduction of symbol display time to seven seconds as issues affecting transparency. While Mehta did not claim that manipulation is currently happening, he argued that such vulnerabilities could be exploited in close contests if officials or programmers acted with bias. However, the ECI says it takes care to prevent any manipulation of the EVMs and VVPAT machines.

== Electoral performance ==
=== General election results ===
Election Year	Lok Sabha	Seats contested	Seats won	+/- seats	Overall Votes	Percentage of votes	+/- Vote	Ref.
2019 (debut)	17th	14	0 / 543	New	28,817	0.0098%	New	
2024	18th	33	0 / 543	Steady	58,024	0.1397%	▲0.12%	

=== State assembly elections ===
Election Year	Seats contested	Seats won	+/- in seats	Overall votes	% of overall votes	+/- in vote share	Sitting side
Maharashtra Legislative Assembly
2019 (debut)	2	0 / 288	New	672	0.001%	New	Steady
2024	18	0 / 288	Steady	5,638	0.008%	▲0.007%	Steady
Jharkhand Legislative Assembly
2019 (debut)	3	0 / 81	New	2,358	0.02%	New	Steady
2024	9	0 / 81	Steady	4,182	0.02%	Steady	Steady
Delhi Legislative Assembly
2020 (debut)	4	0 / 70	New	272	0.002%	New	Steady
2025	20	0 / 70	Steady	1,779	0.018%	▲0.01%	Steady
Bihar Legislative Assembly
2020 (debut)	4	0 / 243	New	3,416	0.008%	New	Steady
West Bengal Legislative Assembly
2021 (debut)	2	0 / 294	New	777	0.001%	Steady	Steady
Punjab Legislative Assembly
2022 (debut)	3	0 / 117	New	373	0.002%	Steady	Steady
Uttarakhand Legislative Assembly
2022 (debut)	4	0 / 70	New	407	0.01%	Steady	Steady
Uttar Pradesh Legislative Assembly
2022 (debut)	11	0 / 403	New	4,264	0.004%	Steady	Steady
Gujarat Legislative Assembly
2022 (debut)	21	0 / 182	New	7,656	0.02%	Steady	Steady
Rajasthan Legislative Assembly
2023 (debut)	26	0 / 200	New	17,264	0.04%	Steady	Steady
Chhattisgarh Legislative Assembly
2023 (debut)	6	0 / 90	New	1,059	0.01%	Steady	Steady
Madhya Pradesh Legislative Assembly
2023 (debut)	5	0 / 230	New	2,177	0.01%	Steady	Steady

=== General Election ===
==== 2019 ====
The 2019 Indian general election were the party's first electoral contest. RRP fielded 14 candidates of various constituencies including Gandhinagar, Ahmedabad East, Ahmedabad West, Anand, Bangalore North, Bhopal, Ahmadnagar, Jhunjhunu, Chittorgarh, Bhilwara, Ghaziabad, Jamshedpur, Chandni Chowk, North East Delhi. RRP got a total of 28,817 votes polled and all candidates lost their deposits. RRP candidate of Chandni chowk Loksabha constituency Richa Katiyar, a scientist-turned lawyer told Hindustan Times that the main objective of the party, as the name suggests, is to create a system where citizens are empowered with recall right so that they can recall their elected representatives if they are not satisfied with their performance.

==== 2024 ====
In the 2024 General elections, the Right to Recall Party (RRP) Contested on 33 seats across Maharashtra, Gujarat, Rajasthan, Delhi, Uttar Pradesh, Madhya Pradesh, Chhattisgarh, Jharkhand, Haryana, and West Bengal. In Rajasthan, Aditya Prakash Sharma represented the RRP in the Jaipur Rural constituency, filing his nomination during the first phase of the Lok Sabha elections. Sharma stated that the party would campaign on key issues such as introducing a law to allow the early removal of the Prime Minister through public vote, replacing EVMs with paper ballots, and substituting the Goods and Services Tax (GST) with an empty land tax. In Pune, software engineer Yuvraj Limbole contested under the party’s banner, championing a legal framework that allows voters to recall under-performing representatives, as well as policies on transparent leasing of government land and sharing mineral royalties directly with citizens. Though none of its candidates won a seat and all candidates lost their deposits. Pooja Saxena, the candidate from Ghaziabad loksabha constituency, said that the pressure cooker symbol was chosen by the party to represent the idea of applying pressure on the government to deliver on its promises. In the 2024 Indian general election in Gujarat the Right to Recall Party was one of several smaller political parties that took part in the race. The party was among 15 lesser-known parties that fielded candidates across various constituencies in the state. In the 2024 Indian general election in Gujarat, the Party fielded a Muslim candidate from the Kheda lok sabha constituency. The party was among a few smaller political groups, alongside some smaller parties, to nominate Muslim candidates, while most such candidates in the state contested as independents.

=== Maharashtra Legislative Assembly election ===
==== 2019 ====
RRP contested 2019 Maharashtra Legislative Assembly election and fielded 2 candidates from various assembly constituencies including Shevgaon, and Ambegaon. RRP got a total of 672 votes polled and both candidates lost their deposits.

==== 2024 ====
RRP Contested 2024 Maharashtra Legislative Assembly Election and fielded 18 candidates from various assembly constituencies. RRP got a total of 5,638 votes polled and all candidates lost their deposits. The party focused on its main idea of giving voters the right to remove elected representatives through a legal recall process. Their candidate, Manoj Nayak, said that if 10% or more voters in a constituency express no confidence in an MLA, a recall election should be held.

=== Jharkhand Legislative Assembly election ===
==== 2019 ====
RRP contested 2019 Jharkhand Legislative Assembly election and fielded 3 candidates from various assembly constituencies including potka, Jamshedpur East, and Jamshedpur West. RRP got a total of 2358 votes polled and all candidates lost their deposits.

==== 2024 ====
RRP Contested 2024 Jharkhand Legislative Assembly Election and fielded 9 Candidates from various assembly constituencies. RRP got a total of 4,182 votes polled and all candidates lost their deposits.

=== Delhi Legislative Assembly election ===
==== 2020 ====
RRP contested 2020 Delhi Legislative Assembly election and fielded 4 candidates from various assembly constituencies including New Delhi, Laxmi Nagar, Ghonda, and Patparganj. RRP got a total of 272 votes polled and all candidates lost their deposits.

==== 2025 ====
In the 2025 Delhi legislative Assembly election, RRP took part by contesting in 21 out of 70 seats. RRP focused on issues like using paper ballots instead of Black-Glass EVMs, making law to give government land on rent more openly to reduce house rents, bringing a law to recall the Delhi Chief Minister, and solving the problem of stray dogs. The party’s Delhi state president, Rahul Tiwari, led the campaign and aimed to increase the party’s support in the state. Anima Ojha, the Right to Recall Party candidate from the Laxmi Nagar Assembly constituency, stated that the party has fielded candidates in elections across various states. According to Ojha, the party has drafted 30 proposed laws aimed at contributing to the nation’s progress. The objective of contesting elections is to raise public awareness about these laws. She emphasized that regardless of which party forms the government, the Right to Recall Party’s primary goal is to inform and engage the public on these legislative proposals.

=== Bihar Legislative Assembly election ===
==== 2020 ====
RRP contested 2020 Bihar Legislative Assembly election and fielded 4 candidate from various assembly constituencies including Katihar, Mahua, Amarpur, and Kasba. RRP got a total of 3416 votes polled and all candidates lost their deposits.

=== West Bengal Legislative Assembly election ===
==== 2021 ====
RRP contested 2021 West Bengal Legislative Assembly election and fielded 2 candidate from various assembly constituencies including Sonarpur, and Ramnagar. RRP got a total of 777 votes polled and both candidates lost their deposits.

=== Punjab Legislative Assembly election ===
==== 2022 ====
RRP contested Punjab Legislative Assembly election 2022 and fielded 3 candidates from Various constituencies including Amritsar South, Dera Bassi, and Ludhiana South. RRP got a total of 407 votes polled and all candidates lost their deposits.

=== Uttarakhand Legislative Assembly election ===
==== 2022 ====
RRP contested 2022 Uttarakhand Legislative Assembly election and fielded 4 candidates from various constituencies including Tehri, Raipur, Doiwala, and Kotdwar. RRP got a total of 373 votes polled and all candidates lost their deposits.

=== Uttar Pradesh Legislative Assembly election ===
==== 2022 ====
RRP contested 2022 Uttar Pradesh Legislative Assembly election and fielded 11 candidates from various constituencies including Sahibabad, Ghaziabad, Mathura, Jhansi Nagar, Charkhari, Phaphamau, Mehnaun, Barhaj, Hata, Gorakhpur Urban, and Varanasi South. RRP got a total of 4,264 votes polled and all candidates lost their deposits.

=== Gujarat Legislative Assembly election ===
==== 2022 ====
In December 2022 RRP fielded 21 candidates in 2022 Gujarat Legislative Assembly election from various constituencies including Bhuj, Jetpur (Rajkot), Porbandar, Una, Gariadhar, Bhavnagar East, Botad, Karanj, Visnagar, Prantij, Ghatlodia, Vejalpur, Ellisbridge, Amraiwadi, Maninagar, Lathi, Dhandhuka, Petlad, Nadiad, Dahegam, and Bapunagar. RRP got a total of 7,656 votes polled and all candidates lost their deposits. In this election the Election Commission of India allotted a common election symbol 'Pressure Cooker' to RRP for all 182 assembly constituencies in Gujarat State.

=== Rajasthan Legislative Assembly election ===
==== 2023 ====
RRP contested 2023 Rajasthan Legislative Assembly Election and fielded 26 candidates from various constituencies. RRP got a total of 17,264 votes polled and all candidates lost their deposits.

=== Madhya Pradesh Legislative Assembly election ===
==== 2023 ====
RRP contested 2023 Madhya Pradesh Legislative Assembly Election and fielded 5 candidates from various constituencies. RRP got a total of 2,177 votes polled and all candidates lost their deposits.

=== Chhattisgarh Legislative Assembly election ===
==== 2023 ====
RRP contested 2023 Chhattisgarh Legislative Assembly Election and fielded 6 candidates from various constituencies. RRP got a total of 1,059 votes polled and all candidates lost their deposits.

== Allegations ==
In February 2020, some media reports published that 70 registered unrecognized parties including RRP received funds via electoral bonds. But Mehta claimed that his party did not even have a bank account when they received the letter from the Election Commission of India. He also claimed that they had submitted a nil donation report to the EC.

== Attack on RRP candidate ==
In 2020, Bir Singh Deogam, the MLA candidate of RRP in 2019 Jharkhand Legislative Assembly election from Potka Assembly Constituency was attacked and beaten up.

In 2024 , candidate from Right To Recall party Bhatt Sunilkumar Narendrabhai noticed booth capture at LotiyaBhagol and there was heated argument with booth agent who tried to bash him and entire incident was narrated to Returning officer and Observer of Anand Loksabha Constituency No.16 and which resulted in stricter norm thereafter during counting process, which resulted in house arrest of all booth agent who might disturb the counting process
