= Potka Assembly constituency =

Constituency of the Jharkhand legislative assembly in India

Coordinates: 22.62°N 86.22°E

Potka
- Constituency No. 46 for the Jharkhand Legislative Assembly

Constituency details
- Country: India
- Region: East India
- State: Jharkhand
- District: East Singhbhum
- Lok Sabha constituency: Jamshedpur
- Established: 2000
- Total electors: 288,142
- Reservation: ST

Member of Legislative Assembly
- 5th Jharkhand Legislative Assembly
- Incumbent Sanjib Sardar
- Party: JMM
- Alliance: MGB
- Elected year: 2024

Potka is an assembly constituency in the Indian state of Jharkhand.

Most successful parties after separate Jharkhand state.
1. JMM (60.0%)
2. BJP (40.0%)

== Overview ==
According to the Delimitation of Parliamentary and Assembly Constituencies Order, 2008 of the Election Commission of India, Potka Assembly constituency covers Potka police station, Palasbani, Asta, Kowali, Nunia, Kumarasol, Barakanjiya, Bomaro Bangoriya and Damudih gram panchayats in Musabani police station. Bagbera town and Karandih – Purihasa, Hargarghutu, Bagbera panchayats and Kitadih village in Jugsalai police station. It is a reserved constituency for Scheduled Tribes. Potka (Vidhan Sabha constituency) is part of Jamshedpur (Lok Sabha constituency).

== Members of the Legislative Assembly ==
Election	Member	Party
Bihar Legislative Assembly
Before 1957: see Jugsalai cum Potka constituency
1957	Supai Soren	Jharkhand Party
1962	Majhi Rasraj Tudu	Indian National Congress
1967-77: Constituency did not exist
1977	Sanatan Sardar	Janata Dal
1980	Sanatan Sardar	Bharatiya Janata Party
1985	Sanatan Sardar	Indian National Congress
1990	Hari Ram Sardar	Jharkhand Mukti Morcha
1995	Hari Ram Sardar	Jharkhand Mukti Morcha
2000	Maneka Sardar	Bharatiya Janata Party
Jharkhand Legislative Assembly
2005	Amulya Sardar	Jharkhand Mukti Morcha
2009	Maneka Sardar	Bharatiya Janata Party
2014	Maneka Sardar	Bharatiya Janata Party
2019	Sanjib Sardar	Jharkhand Mukti Morcha
2024	Sanjib Sardar	Jharkhand Mukti Morcha

== Election results ==
=== Assembly election 2024 ===
2024 Jharkhand Legislative Assembly election: Potka
Party	Candidate	Votes	%	±%
JMM	Sanjib Sardar	120,322	51.97%	▼3.64
BJP	Meera Munda	92,420	39.92%	▲5.95
JLKM	Bhagirathi Hansda	5,723	2.47%	New
Independent	Subodh Singh Sardar	2,405	1.04%	New
Independent	Sunita Murmu	2,180	0.94%	New
NOTA	None of the Above	1,952	0.84%	▼0.66
Margin of victory		27,902	12.05%	▼9.60
Turnout		2,31,528	74.29%	▲5.17
Registered electors		3,11,654		▲8.16
JMM hold		Swing	▼3.64	

=== Assembly election 2019 ===
2019 Jharkhand Legislative Assembly election: Potka
Party	Candidate	Votes	%	±%
JMM	Sanjib Sardar	110,753	55.61%	▲22.54
BJP	Maneka Sardar	67,643	33.97%	▼2.71
AJSU	Bulu Rani Singh	5,735	2.88%	New
JVM(P)	Naresh Kumar Murmu	3,891	1.95%	▼3.91
JD(U)	Ishwar Soren	2,127	1.07%	New
RRP	Bir Singh Deogam	1,872	0.94%	New
Independent	Sirma Dewgam	1,330	0.67%	New
NOTA	None of the Above	2,993	1.50%	▼0.50
Margin of victory		43,110	21.65%	▲18.04
Turnout		1,99,150	69.12%	▲0.41
Registered electors		2,88,142		▲6.48
JMM gain from BJP		Swing	▲18.94	

=== Assembly election 2014 ===
2014 Jharkhand Legislative Assembly election: Potka
Party	Candidate	Votes	%	±%
BJP	Maneka Sardar	68,191	36.68%	▲3.32
JMM	Sanjib Sardar	61,485	33.07%	▲14.32
INC	Dukhni Mai Sardar	14,227	7.65%	▼13.82
JPP	Surya Singh Besra	12,177	6.55%	New
JVM(P)	Upendra Nath Sardar	10,905	5.87%	New
SP	Naresh Kumar Murmu	3,767	2.03%	New
Independent	Sagar Besra	2,270	1.22%	New
NOTA	None of the Above	3,730	2.01%	New
Margin of victory		6,706	3.61%	▼8.28
Turnout		1,85,919	68.71%	▲10.19
Registered electors		2,70,603		▲19.78
BJP hold		Swing	▲3.32	

=== Assembly election 2009 ===
2009 Jharkhand Legislative Assembly election: Potka
Party	Candidate	Votes	%	±%
BJP	Maneka Sardar	44,095	33.36%	▲3.17
INC	Subodh Singh Sardar	28,385	21.47%	New
JMM	Amulya Sardar	24,789	18.75%	▼21.82
Independent	Naresh Kumar Murmu	6,244	4.72%	New
JBSP	Chunka Mardi	5,317	4.02%	New
AJSU	Krishna Mardi	2,669	2.02%	New
UGDP	Alhan Mardi	2,560	1.94%	New
Margin of victory		15,710	11.89%	▲1.50
Turnout		1,32,181	58.51%	▲0.21
Registered electors		2,25,909		▼0.60
BJP gain from JMM		Swing	▼7.21	

=== Assembly election 2005 ===
2005 Jharkhand Legislative Assembly election: Potka
Party	Candidate	Votes	%	±%
JMM	Amulya Sardar	53,760	40.57%	▲19.73
BJP	Maneka Sardar	40,001	30.19%	▲0.61
JPP	Surya Singh Besra	21,162	15.97%	New
Independent	Hari Ram Sardar	4,403	3.32%	New
JDP	Phudan Murmu	2,067	1.56%	New
Independent	Alhan Mardi	2,008	1.52%	New
Independent	Khela Ram Besra	1,761	1.33%	New
Margin of victory		13,759	10.38%	▲1.65
Turnout		1,32,509	58.31%	▲6.40
Registered electors		2,27,267		▲15.78
JMM gain from BJP		Swing	▲10.99	

=== Assembly election 2000 ===
2000 Bihar Legislative Assembly election: Potka
Party	Candidate	Votes	%	±%
BJP	Maneka Sardar	30,132	29.58%	New
JMM	Krishna Mardi	21,235	20.84%	New
Independent	Surya Singh Besra	20,421	20.05%	New
INC	Hari Ram Sardar	16,683	16.38%	New
CPI	Gunadhar Singh	4,134	4.06%	New
RJD	Aastik Sardar	4,127	4.05%	New
SP	Babulal Murmu	2,196	2.16%	New
Margin of victory		8,897	8.73%	
Turnout		1,01,874	52.60%	
Registered electors		1,96,285		
BJP win (new seat)				

== See also ==
- Vidhan Sabha
- List of states of India by type of legislature
