= Maneka Sardar =

Indian politician

Member of Legislative Assembly, Government of Jharkhand
- Constituency: Potka
- In office 2000-05, 2009-14, 2014-19

Personal details
- Party: Bhartiya Janata Party
- Spouse: Bibhishan Singh Bhumij
- Education: B.A.(Hons.) (1990), I.A.(1987), Matric(1985)
- Occupation: Social Service, Politician

Maneka Sardar is an Indian politician and member of the Bharatiya Janata Party. Sardar was a member of the Jharkhand Legislative Assembly from the Potka constituency in Purbi Singhbhum district.

== See also ==
- Potka (Vidhan Sabha constituency)
- Sanjib Sardar
