= East Singhbhum district =

Coordinates: 22.8000°N 86.1834°E

East Singhbhum district Pūrvī Siṁhbhūm Jilā
- District of Jharkhand
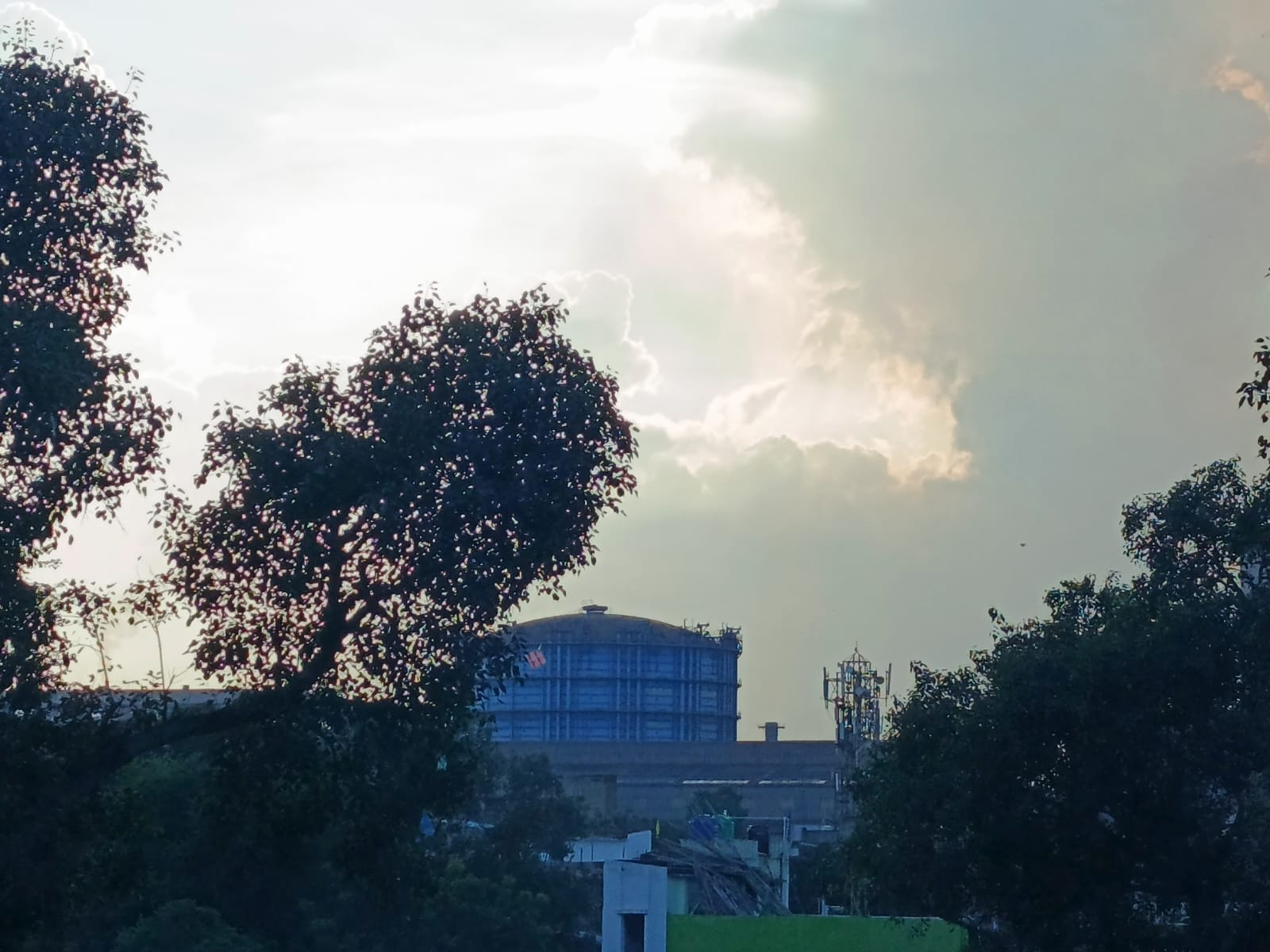
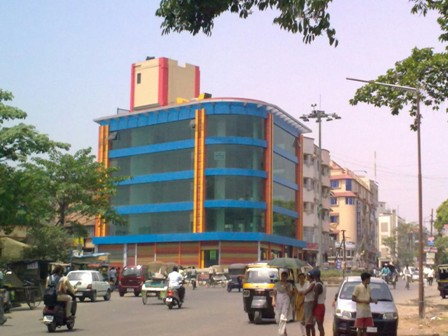
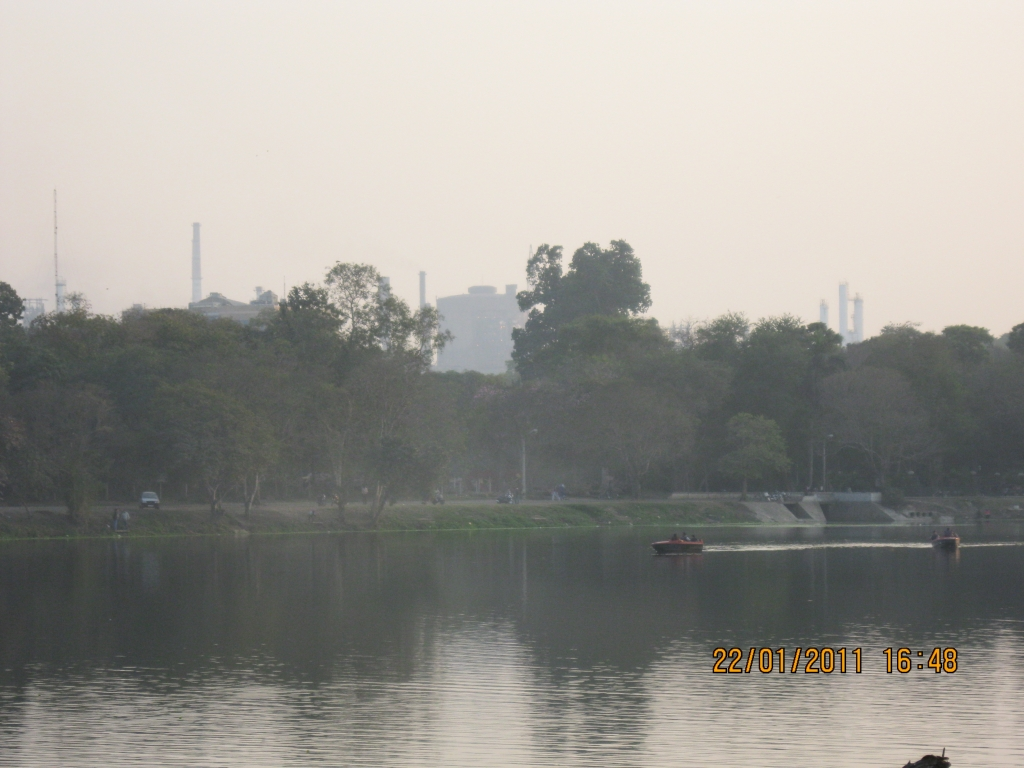
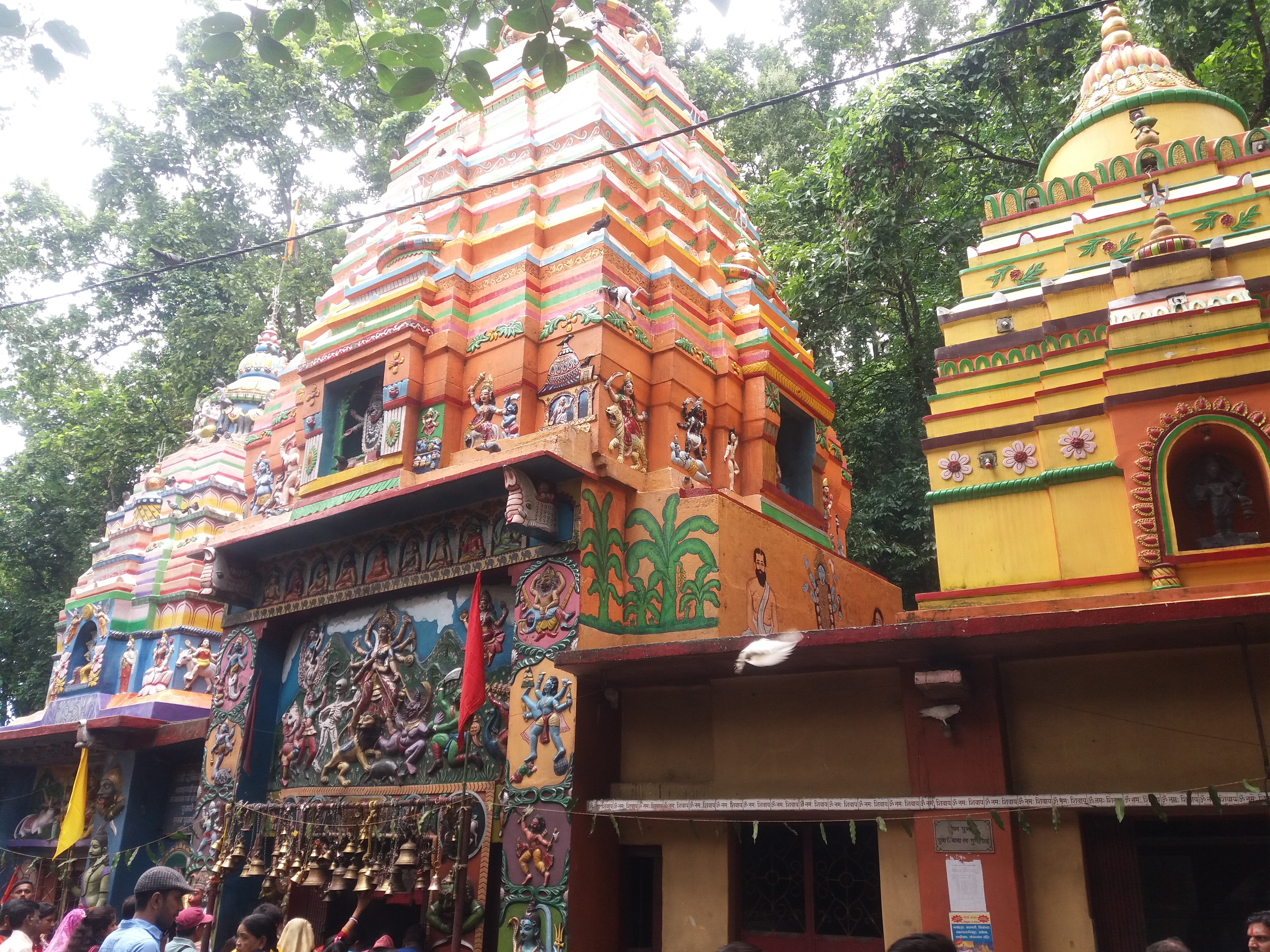
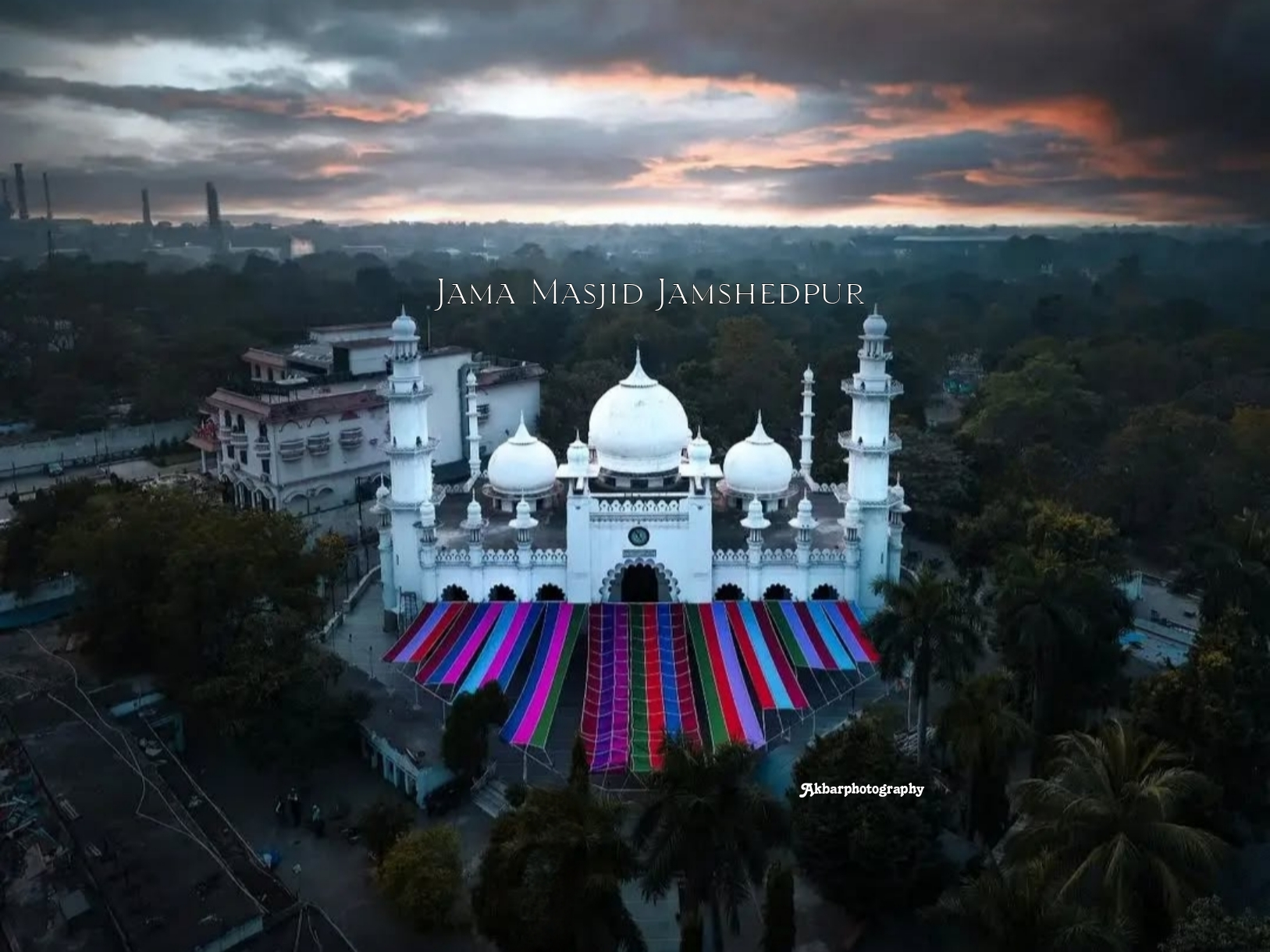
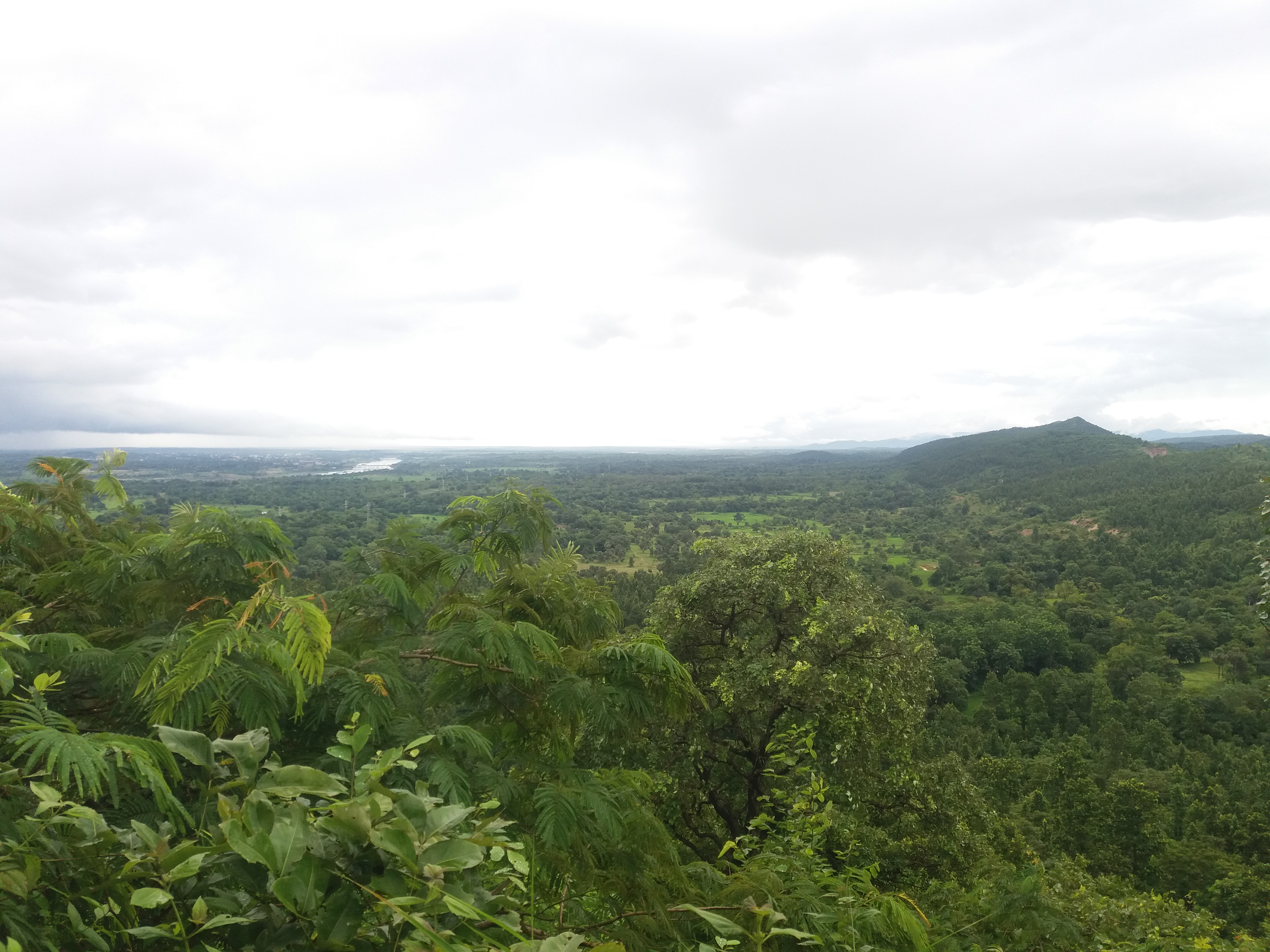
- Clockwise from top-left: Sakchi Market, Jayanti Sarovar in Jubilee Park, Jama Masjid Jamshedpur, Rankini Mandir, Jadugora
- Interactive map of East Singhbhum district
- Country: India
- State: Jharkhand
- Division: Kolhan
- Established: 16 January 1990
- Headquarter: Jamshedpur

Government
  - Deputy Commissioner: Shri Rajiv Ranjan (IAS)
  - Senior Superintendent of police: Shri Piyush Pandey (IPS)
  - Lok Sabha constituencies: Jamshedpur
  - MP: Bidyut Baran Mahato (BJP)
  - Vidhan Sabha constituencies: Baharagora, Ghatshila, Potka, Jugsalai, Jamshedpur East, Jamshedpur West

Area
  - Total: 3,562 km^{2} (1,375 sq mi)
  - Urban: 187 km^{2} (72 sq mi)
  - Rural: 3,374 km^{2} (1,303 sq mi)
  - Rank: 11th

Population (2011)
  - Total: 2,293,919
  - Rank: 4th
  - Density: 644.0/km^{2} (1,668/sq mi)
  - Rank: 4th
  - Urban: 1,274,591
  - Urban density: 6,820/km^{2} (17,700/sq mi)
  - Rural: 1,019,328
  - Rural density: 302.1/km^{2} (782.5/sq mi)
  - Scheduled Castes: 111,414 (4.86%)
  - Scheduled Tribes: 653,923 (28.51%)

Languages
  - Official: Hindi

Demographics
  - Literacy: 75.49 per cent
  - Sex ratio: 949
- Time zone: UTC+05:30 (IST)
- Vehicle registration: JH-05
- Major highways: NH 18, NH 118, NH 220, NH 49
- Website: jamshedpur.nic.in

East Singhbhum district or Purbi Singhbhum district is one of the 24 districts of Jharkhand, India. It was created on 16 January 1990. More than 50% of the district is covered by dense forests and mountains, where wild animals once roamed freely. It is known for being a centre of industry since Jamshedpur, the most populous city in Jharkhand, is located here.

== Geography ==
The district is bounded on the east by Jhargram district, on the north by Purulia district, both of West Bengal, on the west by Seraikela Kharsawan district, and on the south by Mayurbhanj district of Odisha. Total area of the district is 3,562 kilometers. The district is a mineral rich and industrialized region. Dalma Wildlife Sanctuary is a popular biosphere reserve known lively for its animals. Dalma Hills is stretching over Jharkhand and West Bengal. It is on the northern region of Jamshedpur. A lot of minerals are found here.

Climate data for Jamshedpur, India
Month	Jan	Feb	Mar	Apr	May	Jun	Jul	Aug	Sep	Oct	Nov	Dec	Year
Mean daily maximum °C (°F)	24 (76)	27 (81)	32 (91)	36 (98)	38 (98)	33 (93)	31 (88)	31 (88)	30 (87)	30 (86)	27 (82)	24 (76)	30 (87)
Mean daily minimum °C (°F)	14 (57)	16 (62)	21 (70)	25 (78)	27 (81)	27 (81)	26 (80)	26 (79)	25 (78)	22 (73)	18 (65)	13 (57)	22 (72)
Average precipitation cm (inches)	10.8 (0.43)	13.3 (0.52)	19.4 (0.76)	17.7 (0.70)	54.9 (2.16)	172.8 (6.8)	230.9 (9.09)	252.7 (9.95)	165.8 (6.53)	54.5 (2.15)	8.7 (0.34)	5.9 (0.23)	1,007.4 (39.66)
Source: Weatherbase and MSN Weather

== Administration ==
East Singhbhum district, situated in the state of Jharkhand, is administratively organized into two Sub-Divisions: Dhalbhum and Ghatshila, each with its headquarters in Jamshedpur and Ghatshila, respectively. The district comprises eleven blocks, namely Golmuri-cum-Jugsalai (commonly referred to as Jamshedpur), Potka, Patamda, and Boram within the Dhalbhum Sub-Division, and Ghatshila, Musabani, Dumaria, Baharagora, Dhalbhumgarh, Chakulia, and Gurabandha within the Ghatshila Sub-Division. It has a total of 231 Panchayats and approximately 1,810 revenue villages.

=== Panchayats and Villages ===
See: List of villages in East Singhbhum district

== Demographics ==
Historical population
Year	Pop.	±%
1901	362,602	—
1911	404,856	+11.7%
1921	428,214	+5.8%
1931	523,234	+22.2%
1941	623,955	+19.2%
1951	677,881	+8.6%
1961	871,595	+28.6%
1971	1,064,361	+22.1%
1981	1,378,949	+29.6%
1991	1,613,088	+17.0%
2001	1,982,988	+22.9%
2011	2,293,919	+15.7%
Source: Census of India

According to the 2011 census East Singhbhum district has a population of 2,293,919, roughly equal to the nation of Latvia or the US state of New Mexico. This gives it a ranking of 199th in India (out of a total of 640). The district has a population density of 648 inhabitants per square kilometre (1,680/sq mi). Its population growth rate over the decade 2001-2011 was 15.53%. Purbi Singhbhum has a sex ratio of 949 females for every 1000 males, and a literacy rate of 75.49%. 55.56% of the population lives in urban areas. Scheduled Castes and Scheduled Tribes collectively account for 33.37% (4.86% SC and 28.51% ST) of the district's total population. The prominent communities in this group, in terms of the district's total population, are Santal (15.01%), Bhumij (5.44%), Ho (2.48%), Munda (2.36%), Ghasi (1.08%), Dhobi (0.95%), Bhuiya (0.7%), Dom (0.65%), Mahli (0.59%), Chamar/Mochi (0.56%), Oraon (0.54%), Kharia (0.48%), Savar (0.35%), Lohra (0.24%), Hari/Mehtar/Bhangi (0.24%), Gond (0.18%), Dusadh/Dhari/Dharhi (0.16%), Bathudi (0.14%), Kol (0.13%), Bauri (0.11%), Kora (0.1%), Pasi (0.06%), Pan, Sawasi (0.06%), and Rajwar (0.06%). Other notable communities such as Gorait, Turi, Mal Paharia, Chik Baraik, Kharwar, Birhor, Karmali, Kisan, Nagesia, Korwa, Bedia, Sauria Paharia, Musahar, Bhogta, Chaupal, and Kawar have populations ranging between one thousand to a hundred.

=== Religion ===
Religion in East Singhbhum district (2011)
Religion	Percent
Hinduism	67.58%
Sarna	20.29%
Islam	8.43%
Sikhism	1.68%
Christianity	1.32%
Not stated	0.79%

=== Language ===
Languages of East Singhbhum district (2011)
1. Bengali (34.4%)
2. Hindi (16.8%)
3. Santali (15.9%)
4. Urdu (7.28%)
5. Bhojpuri (5.65%)
6. Odia (5.27%)
7. Ho (2.76%)
8. Mundari (2.73%)
9. Punjabi (1.86%)
10. Magahi (1.51%)
11. Maithili (1.28%)
12. Telugu (0.97%)
13. Others (3.52%)

At the time of the 2011 Census of India, 34.42% of the population in the district spoke Bengali, 16.83% Hindi, 15.92% Santali, 7.28% Urdu, 5.65% Bhojpuri, 5.27% Odia, 2.76% Ho, 2.73% Mundari, 1.86% Punjabi, 1.51% Magahi, 1.28% Maithili and 0.97% Telugu as their first language.

== Economy ==
East Singhbhum district has a leading position in respect of mining and other industrial activities in Jharkhand state. Jamshedpur, a leading industrial city of India, is the district headquarter of East Singbhum. An almost five-decade old copper refinery of Hindustan Copper Limited is in Moubhandar, Ghatshila, another town of the district. The Singhbhum Shear Zone, a geological feature lying between river Subarnarekha on the northeast and Dhanjauri ranges on the southwest houses the mines of Copper and Uranium. Most notable copper mines are Banalopa, Badia, Pathargora, Dhobni, Kendadih, Rakha and Surda in Musabani. Of these, only Surda remains operational. Uranium Corporation of India explores uranium in Jadugora, Narwapahar, Bhatin, Turamdih and Baghjanta.

Chakulia, an important town in the southeastern part of the district, is famous for its rice mills, oil mills, washing soap factories, and bamboo production.

== Culture ==
The most prominent festivals of the district are Durga Puja, Makar Sankranti, Sohrai, Mage Porob, Baa Porob, Hermuutu, Heroh Porob, Karam Porob, Jomnama Porob, Jomsuim and Kali Puja. While other festivals such as Sarhul, Karma, Tusu, Java, Hall Punhya, Bhagta Parab, Ropini, Bandna and Jani-Shikaar are also celebrated with pomp and joy.

One tourist attraction is Chitreshwar temple situated in Chitreshwar village in Baharagora Block 12 km from Baharagora. The temple is said to be one of the largest natural Shiva linga. Many devotees of Shiva come daily. Chitreshwar temple is believed to have the largest Shiva linga after Lingaraja Shiva linga in Bhubneshwar. It has another temple called Bhuteshwar which is in Baharagora Block. Ghatsila a famous tourist spot is also situated in the district which was once inhabited by renowned Bengali novelist Bibhutibhushan Bandyopadhyay. Rankini Temple located near the mining town of Jadugora and Ghatshila are also worth mentioning. Goddess Rankini is held in high esteem and worshiped by the tribal and non tribal people inhabiting the district.

== Politics ==
There are six Vidhan Sabha constituencies in this district: Baharagora, Ghatsila, Potka, Jugsalai, Jamshedpur East and Jamshedpur West. All of these are part of Jamshedpur Lok Sabha constituency.

District	No.	Constituency	Name	Party	Alliance	Remarks	East Singhbhum	44	Baharagora	Samir Mohanty	JMM	MGB
45	Ghatsila	Ramdas Soren	Died on 15 August 2025				East Singhbhum				JMM	MGB
45	Ghatsila	Somesh Soren	Elected in 2025 by-election				East Singhbhum				JMM	MGB
46	Potka	Sanjib Sardar					East Singhbhum				JMM	MGB
47	Jugsalai	Mangal Kalindi					East Singhbhum				JMM	MGB
48	Jamshedpur East	Purnima Sahu		BJP	NDA		East Singhbhum					
49	Jamshedpur West	Saryu Roy		JD(U)	NDA		East Singhbhum					

== See also ==
- West Singhbhum district
