= Sonari, Jamshedpur =

Sonari
- Neighbourhood
- Sonari
- Interactive map of Sonari
- Coordinates: 22°48′47″N 86°09′57″E
- Country: India
- State: Jharkhand
- City: Jamshedpur
- Time zone: GMT + 0530
- Postal code: 831011
- Area code: 0657

Sonari is the largest residential area in the city of Jamshedpur, which is also served by Sonari Airport (IATA: IXW, ICAO: VEJS). Domuhani bridge in Marine Drive connects Sonari with NH-33. The area is easily accessible through Marine Drive (Western Corridor) from Adityapur, Kadma, which also connects it with the Northern towns of Sakchi and Bistupur. The major roads such as Rivers Meet Road (a stretch of road from CH Area Circle to Domuhani), Balichela Road (a road running between the Sonari Town connects Balichela Junction to Kagal Nagar), and Dispensary Road (a city road running through Balichela).

== Infrastructure ==
Sonari houses plenty of housing societies and apartments. It has 2nd highest number of residential societies in the city. The area is divided into 4 layouts - North, West, East and South.

=== Markets ===
There are multiple markets to cater such large neighbourhood. Major markets around the area are

- Adarsh Nagar Market : a small market situated in Adarsh Nagar Phase VI, serves Adarsh Nagar and areas nearby.
- Aerodrome Market : situated around the Rivers Meet Road, Airport Area, in proximity to New Line, East Layout, Khuntadih, Christianpara, South Layout.
- Domuhani Haat : a weekly haat organised in Domuhani (River's Confluence).
- Gudri Market : situated around Dispensary Road, South Layout, in proximity to Christianpara, Ballichela, Adarsh Nagar, South Layout.
- Kagalnagar Market : a marketplace situated around West Layout, in-proximity to Kagal Nagar, West Layout, East Layout.

=== Parks and Recreation ===
To cater the residents of such large area, there are number of parks and green spaces built around the neighborhood. Such as Kagalnagar Park, Sonari Ram Mandir Park, New Kagalnagar Park, Joggers Park, Children's Park, Aerodrome Park etc. The neighborhood also features a community center known as Sonari Community Centre for various recreational activities. Maidans around the area are used for various purposes including playgrounds, wedding venues, and Durga Puja exhibitions.

=== Places of interest ===
- Tribal Culture Centre : Founded in the year 1990, this centre is aimed to preserve the culture of the Santhal, Ho, Oraon, Munda and other tribes. The centre has huge sculptures of leaders of the freedom movement like Baba Tilka Majhi, Birsa Munda and Sidho-Kanhu. The gallery is lined with paintings and the inner repository has a number of antiques and relics on display.
- Domuhani (Confluence of Subarnarekha and Kharkai Rivers) : A geographical feature situated in the northern part of Sonari, this place is regarded as a sacred site and religious ceremonies and rituals are held near its banks.

=== Schools ===
Carmel Junior College located in Adarsh Nagar, along with its branch Carmel Bal Vihar. Other schools around the neighborhood include RMS High School (Khuntadih campus, Ballichela campus), DAV Girls High School, and various other kindergartens and playschools.

=== Sub-localities and colonies ===
Sonari has different mixed-use area blocks such as Kagal Nagar, Sangam Vihar, Adarsh Nagar, New Line, Christianpara, Khuntadih, Ballichela, Airport Area. The electricity in bustees are provided by the state-run electricity board, which accounts for a small portion of the area. The majority of area has electricity and water managed by JUSCO.

- Kagal Nagar : This colony has its own market and a park.
- Adarsh Nagar : A residential housing society spread across a large area. It is divided into 11 phases.
- West Layout : A planned mixed-use colony with wide avenues. It is connected to East Layout with a link road separating them.
- North Layout : Features most of the multi-floor apartments of the neighborhood. A major part of real estate development was done here within past decade, featuring townships like Vijaya's Golden Town, Swarn Vihar etc.
- Ashiana Gardens : A gated residential colony, built by Ashiana Housing, it features various duplexes, and multi-floor apartments.

== See also ==
- List of neighbourhoods of Jamshedpur
