= St. Agnes PU College, Mangaluru =

St. Agnes Pre University College

Location
- Bendore; Mangaluru, Karnataka; India

Information
- Type: Pre-University College
- Motto: Latin: Deus fortitudo mea English: God is my strength
- Established: 1921
- Principal: Sr.Norine DSouza A.C.
- Campus: Urban
- Mascot: Lamb with the victory palm
- Publication: Agnesians

St. Agnes PU College is an educational institution in the city of Mangaluru in the Indian state of Karnataka. It is in the Bendore area, where the élite of the city reside. It is next door to St. Sebastian's Church. It was founded primarily for the education of Catholic women. The original college was started by the Apostolic Carmel sisters in 1921. It was the first Catholic women's college in South India and the second in the country.

St. Agnes PU College was bifurcated from St. Agnes First Grade College in 2001. The college now has a separate building, which was inaugurated on 14 December 2004.

From 1921 to 2025, the Pre-University College was strictly girls-only. Starting in the 2025-2026 academic year, the college began accepting boys to promote inclusivity.

== History ==
St. Agnes First Grade College was started by the Apostolic Carmel sisters, a congregation founded by Mother Veronica of the Passion (1823-1906) in Bayonne, France, in 1868. It was established in Mangalore in 1870.

It was started to promote all-girls education, and was one of the first colleges in South India to do so.

In 2001, according to the orders of the Government of Karnataka, the then existing St. Agnes College had to be split into St. Agnes Pre-University and Degree Colleges. It had generated a major overhaul of staff, facilities and space. Thus, the decision to construct a new building was taken and executed. Students moved into their new block in the academic year 2004–2005. The new building was inaugurated by Sr. Agatha Mary A.C.

From 2025 onwards, the institution became co-educational.

== College crest ==
The crest has three parts.

The crown on top:
The crown set in gold is encrusted with jewels and precious stones. In past centuries, kings regarded the crown as a symbol of power, prestige and glory. The crown in the crest acquires a different meaning, symbolising the golden age of India's material wealth and cultural splendour. Today, through the education of her women, St. Agnes College endeavours to recrown Bharat Mata (Mother India). Educated and self-reliant women are jewels in the crown of Mother India.

The shield in the centre:
The shield has three partitions. In the first is depicted a cross atop a mountain with three stars on three sides. The mountain is a symbol of prayer and contemplation; the cross is a reminder that the education provided by the college is imbued with the teachings of Christ and the spirit of his person. The three stars signify the historical Carmelite heritage of the Apostolic Carmel congregation.

In the second partition is engraved a coconut palm on the shoreline. It stands for the foundation of the Apostolic Carmel along the western coast of South India in 1870. The coconut tree is symbolic of the quiet dependability and usefulness of the educational mission of the college.

In the third partition, the lamb with the victory palm together represent the patroness of the college, St. Agnes and her spiritual victory. The palm is the symbol of victory over evil. It signifies the power of prayer to help control carnal desires and stand strong against temptation.

The scroll below:
The scroll upholds the college motto Deus fortitudo mea (Latin: God is my strength).

== Streams offered ==
The college offers three streams: science, commerce and arts.

Science stream has four combinations.
PCMB - physics, chemistry, mathematics, biology
PCMC - physics, chemistry, mathematics, computer science
PCMS - physics, chemistry, mathematics, statistics
PCME - physics, chemistry, mathematics, electronics

PCBH - physics, chemistry, biology, homescience

Commerce stream has five combinations.
BEBA - basic mathematics, economics, business studies, accountancy
BSBA - basic mathematics, statistics, business studies, accountancy
CSBA - computer science, statistics, business studies, accountancy
SEBA - statistics, economics, business studies, accountancy
CEBA - computer science, economics, business studies, accountancy

Arts stream has 2 combinations. HEPP- History, Economics, Political science and Psychology

H.ScEPP- Home Science, Economics, Political Science Psychology.
