= Jamshedpur Golf Courses =

Golf course in Jamshedpur, Jharkhand, India

Coordinates: 23.641°N 85.302°E

The Jamshedpur Golf Course in Jamshedpur, Jharkhand state, India, comprises two golf courses - the Beldih Golf Course and the Golmuri Golf Course. It is on the Chota Nagpur Plateau, surrounded by dense forests and hills, and is bordered from east to west by the Dalma Hills. These golf courses have been developed with the participation of the Tata Group.

== Course ==
Both Beldih Golf Course and Golmuri Golf Course are in central Jamshedpur. The former is a nine-hole course, set on an area of 6,000 square yards (5,000 m^{2}). Of these, the Beldih Golf Club is a mix of European and Indian design. It covers an area of 4.85 acres (19,600 m^{2}) and has a club with business facilities. Together, these two courses host the annual Tata Open golf tournament under the aegis of the Professional Golf Tour of India, and supported by Tata Steel. The Golmuri Golf Course also hosts the Steel City Golf tournament.

== History ==
The Beldih Golf Course was set up in 1920. It is a club with a parkland style layout and was the venue of the annual event, the Tata Open.

After the establishment of the Beldih Golf Course, the Golmuri Golf Course was set up as a nine-hole course in 1928. The Golmuri Golf Course is now a modern golf course with 18 holes. It now hosts the Tata Open.

Ninety years after the inception of the Beldih Golf Course, the Golmuri Golf Course was upgraded to an eighteen-hole course.

The 14th Tata Open was held at the Golmuri Golf Course from 17–20 December. It was the first time the tournament had been played on a single 18-hole course.
