= NH 118 =

NH 118 may refer to:

- National Highway 118 (India)
- New Hampshire Route 118, United States
