= Sacred Heart Convent School (Jamshedpur) =

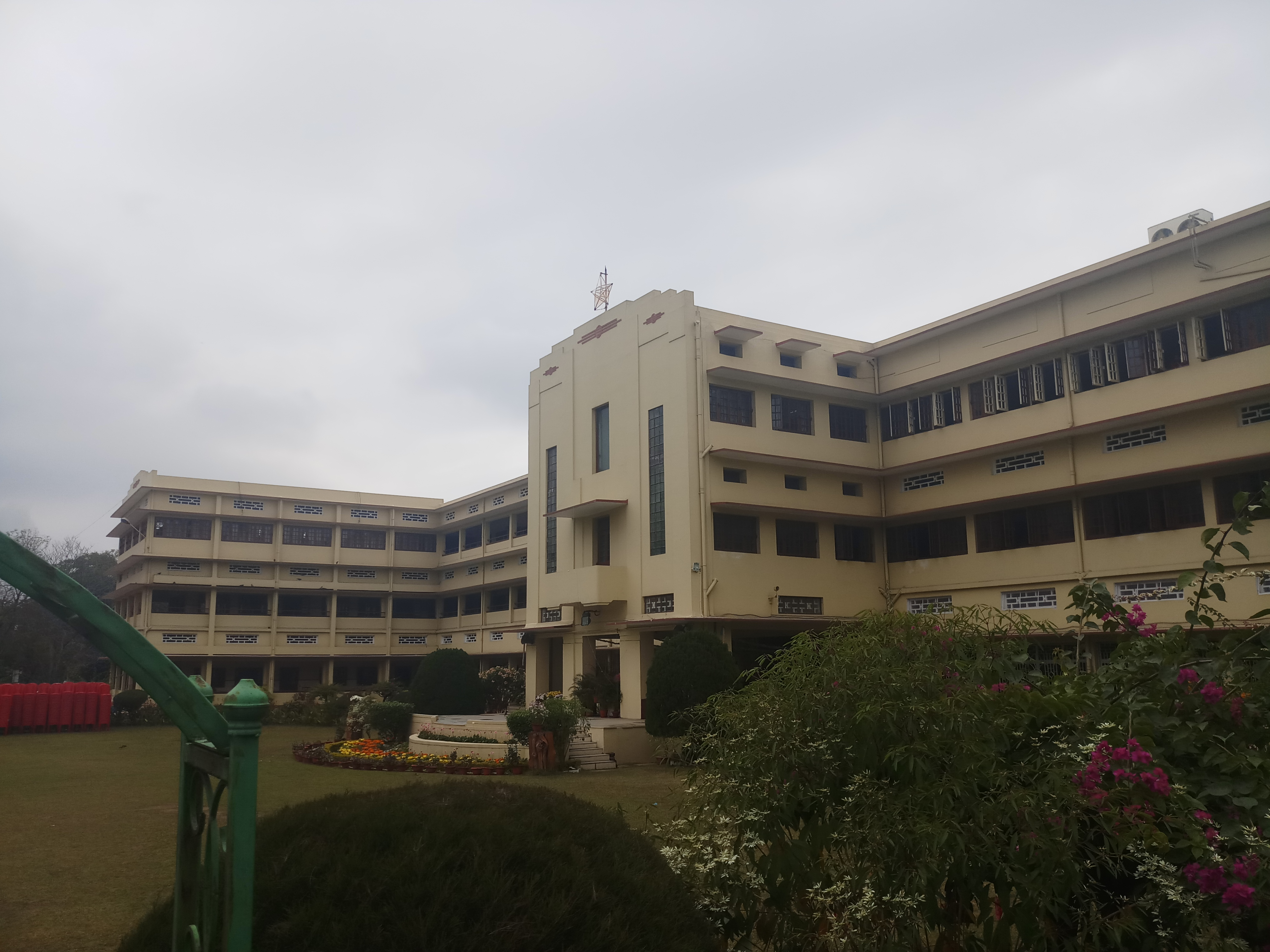
- Main Building

Location
- North Park Ground, N Town, Main Road, Jamshedpur, Jharkhand; India; 22.8074468°N 86.1885517°E

Information
- Type: Convent run Private School
- Motto: Love Conquers All
- Established: 22 January 1945; 81 years ago
- Founder: Reverend Mother Josephine
- Principal: Sr. M. Steffi A.C.
- Grades: Kindergarten – Intermediate
- Language: English
- Campus: Urban
- Colours: Violet, crimson, green, and gold
- Affiliation: Council for the Indian School Certificate Examinations, New Delhi
- Acronym: S.H.C.J.S.R
- Website: shcjsr.org

Sacred Heart Convent School is an English language Catholic education private school for girls run by Apostolic Carmelite nuns in the city of Jamshedpur, India. It is registered under the Indian Societies Registration Act of 1860 under the title 'The Apostolic Carmel Educational Society'. The school has grades from kindergarten to 12th but it is tough to get admission.

== Academics ==
Computer science is taught as a compulsory subject until grade nine. The school is equipped with a lab for computer literacy and programming courses. The computer and basic science courses offered at the school include GW-BASIC; Java (using the BlueJ IDE); and Logo. C++ is an optional course for the Plus Two students wishing to study computer science in college. The standard Chemistry, Physics and Biology courses are offered as part of the science curriculum.

The arts and sciences offering at the school are mathematics (covering geometry, algebra and the calculus); English; Hindi, Sanskrit; geography; environmental science; home economics; political science; commerce; economics; and history.

Many students struggle with the I.C.S.E. exams, so the National Institute of Open Schooling (NIOS) was introduced. This is a program that allows weaker students to prepare for their examination and thus increases their chances of success.

== Student life ==
=== Athletics ===
The school conducts a Sports Day every year including in athletics. The basketball teams have represented the city and the state at district and national level tournaments. Football is practised for an hour each morning. Handball is practised at the Handball Court of JRD Tata Sports Complex adjacent to its premises. The school has a Kho Kho and volleyball team. There is an Annual Volleyball Tournament. Karate is also taught.

=== Competitions ===
The school also prepares students for contests in quiz competitions like the QUANTA, a contest for science, mathematics, astronomy and computer science; the Fountainhead Essay Contest and the Cadbury Bournvita Quiz Contest.

== Principals ==
- Sister Cleopha (1945–1948)
- Sister Mary Joan (1948–1952)
- Sister Cleopha (1952–1955)
- Sister Mary Denise (1955–1958)
- Sister Mary Digna (1958–1961)
- Sister Vera (1961–1966)
- Sister Veronique (1966–1972)
- Sister Yvette (1972–1973)
- Sister Marie Anne (1973–1974)
- Sister Marie Eugene (1974–1978)
- Sister Veronique (1978–1981)
- Sister Norella (1981–1986)
- Sister Flavian (1986–1998)
- Sister Teresita Mary (1998–2014)
- Sister Mridula (2014–2019)
- Sister Rashmita (2019–2024)
- Sister M. Steffi (2024–present)

== Alumni association ==
The Association of Sacred Heart Alumni (ASHA) was founded in 1995 by Sister Flavian.

== See also ==
- Education in India
- Literacy in India
- List of schools in India
