= Dimna =

Dimna may refer to:

- Dimna Lake, an artificial reservoir in Jharkhand, India
- Panchatantra, the collection of Indian animal fables
- Dimnøya, an island in Møre og Romsdal, Norway
