= Chandil Dam =

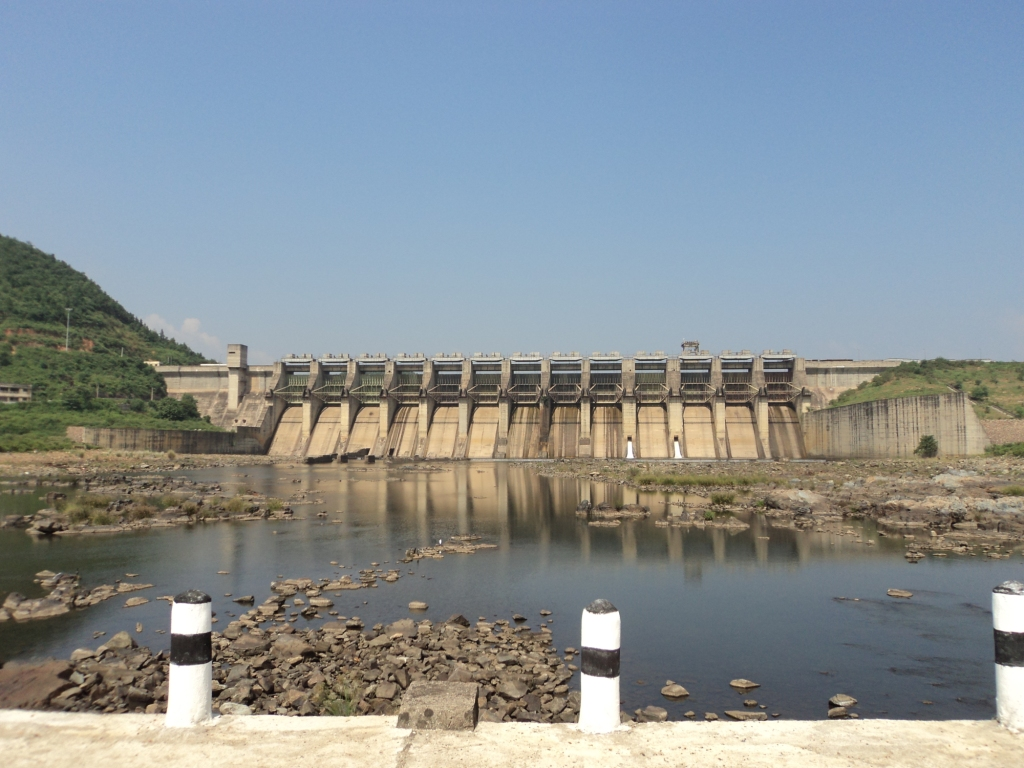
- Chandil Dam

- Location in Jharkhand Chandil Dam (India)
- Country: India
- Location: Seraikela Kharsawan district, Jharkhand
- Coordinates: 22.9747°N 86.0203°E
- Status: Functional
- Construction began: 1982–1993

Dam and spillways
- Impounds: Subarnarekha River
- Height: 56.5 m (185 ft).
- Length: 720.10 m (2,362.5 ft)

Reservoir
- Total capacity: 1,963 square kilometres (196,300 ha)

Chandil Dam was built across the Subarnarekha, in Bihar (later Jharkhand), as a part of the Subarnarekha Multipurpose Project.

== Geography ==
Cities, towns and locations in Seraikela Kharsawan district in Kolhan Division
M: municipality, R: rural/ urban centre, CT: census town, T: tourist centre
Owing to space constraints in the small map, the actual locations in a larger map may vary slightly

=== Location ===
Chandil Dam is located near Chandil, at 22.9747°N 86.0203°E. It is in Chandil block in Seraikela Kharsawan district of Jharkhand state, India.

=== Area overview ===
The area shown in the map has been described as "part of the southern fringe of the Chotanagpur plateau and is a hilly upland tract". 75.7% of the population lives in the rural areas and 24.3% lives in the urban areas.

Note: The map alongside presents some of the notable locations in the district. All places marked in the map are linked in the larger full screen map.

== Subarnarekha Multipurpose Project ==
Subarnarekha Multipurpose Project, jointly sponsored by the governments of Bihar (later Jharkhand), Odisha and West Bengal, supported by a joint agreement signed in 1978. The main components of the project were Chandil Dam and Galudih Barrage across the Subarnarekha, Icha Dam and Kharkhai Barrage across the Kharkai, and associated canal network.

== The project ==
Panoramic view of Chandil Dam

Chandil Dam has a length of 720.10 m (2,362.5 ft) (300.10 m earthen + 400 m concrete) and a height of a height of 56.5 m (185 ft). Gross Storage capacity of Chandil dam is 1500 million cubic meters (52.98 Tmcft) which is the largest among all Jharkhand dams

Chandil Dam reservoir spreads over an area of 1,963 square kilometres (196,300 ha).

== Tourism ==
Seraikela Kharsawan district administration states that the "dam is one of the most visited places of Jharkhand". The Dalma Hills overlook the dam. It is 22 kilometres (14 mi) from Jamshedpur. In a nearby museum, 2,000 year old scripts on rock are on display.
