= Ashiana Housing =

New Delhi, India based real estate development company

Ashiana Housing Limited
- Type: Public
- Traded as: BSE: 523716; NSE: ASHIANA
- Industry: Real estate
- Founded: 1986; 40 years ago
- Founder: Om Gupta
- Headquarters: New Delhi, India
- Area served: New Delhi, Bhiwadi, Neemrana, Jaipur, Jodhpur, Jamshedpur, Lavasa, Kolkata, Chennai, Gujarat, Chas, Bokaro Steel City
- Key people: Mr. Vishal Gupta (managing director); Mr. Ankur Gupta (joint managing director); Mr. Varun Gupta (whole time director)
- Products: Apartments; Retirement community Assisted living Retail; Hotels
- Services: Facilities management
- Revenue: ▲INR1, 1614.18 million (FY 2012–13)
- Net income: ▲INR 331.47 million (FY 2012–13)
- Total assets: ▲INR 574.06 million (FY 2012–13)
- Subsidiaries: Ashiana Maintenance Services, Latest Developers Advisory Limited, Topwell Projects Consultants Limited
- Website: www.ashianahousing.com

Ashiana Housing Ltd. (AHL) is an Indian real estate development company established in 1986 and headquartered in New Delhi, India. The firm is a real estate company that was recognized by Forbes as Asia's 200 Best Under A Billion in 2010 and 2011.

== History ==
Ashiana Housing Ltd. is involved in middle to upper-middle income residential housing projects in satellite cities and towns in India– around industrial hubs – predominantly along the Delhi-Mumbai industrial corridor being promoted by the Government of India. Its residential real estate development projects range from apartments to group housing projects. In addition, it also develops limited retail and commercial properties, including hotels as well as retirement homes for senior citizens.

The company was incorporated on 25 June 1986, under the Companies Act, 1956, as Ashiana Housing & Finance (India) Limited. Subsequently, the name of the company was changed to its present name in 2007.

As of 31 December 2014, the company completed 24 residential developments and 6 commercial developments, aggregating 10.74 million square feet of saleable area.

== Sponsorships and Joint Ventures ==
On 4 January 2010, Ashiana announced a joint venture with the Manglam group in Jaipur for the development of 31 acres of land. The Ashiana Manglam partnership built several projects in Jaipur.

Ashiana Housing raised Rs 200 crore from Goldman Sachs and Creador by way of Qualified Institutional Placement of its equity shares in February 2015.

In June 2015, Ashiana joined Escapade Real Estate, a part of Arihant Foundations, to launch a housing project called "Ashiana Shubham" for senior living and normal housing, in Chennai.

In July 2015, Ashiana signed a partnership deal with Shriram Properties to develop a housing project in Kolkata. Through this partnership with Bengal Shriram Hi-Tech City Pvt. Ltd. (a group company of Shriram Properties Ltd.), the company will develop senior living as well as regular housing on 19.72 acres of land.

== Financial Summary ==
During the fiscal year 2014–15, Ashiana's net profit doubled to Rs 46.49 crore from Rs 21.86 crore (the previous fiscal year). Income from operations increased to Rs 142.70 crore from Rs 110.65 crore. The company claims to have raised Rs 200 crore in 2015 from investors through Qualified Institutional Placement. In the fiscal year 2012–13, the company posted a profit after tax of Rs. 33.2 crore. The company reported a 61% increase in revenues (sales & other income) in 2011–12 over the previous financial year (2010–11).
