= Carmel Junior College =

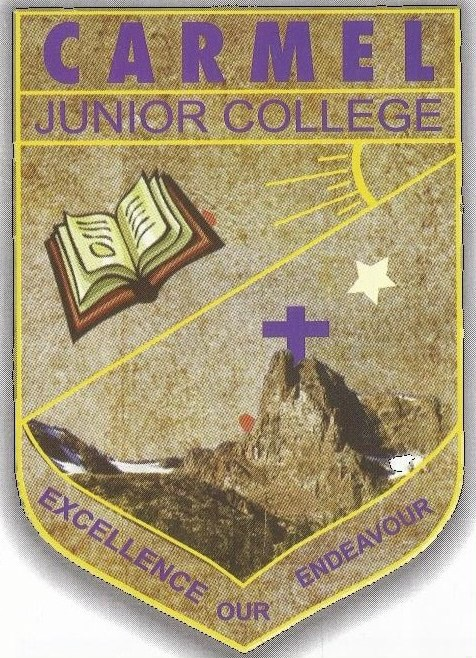

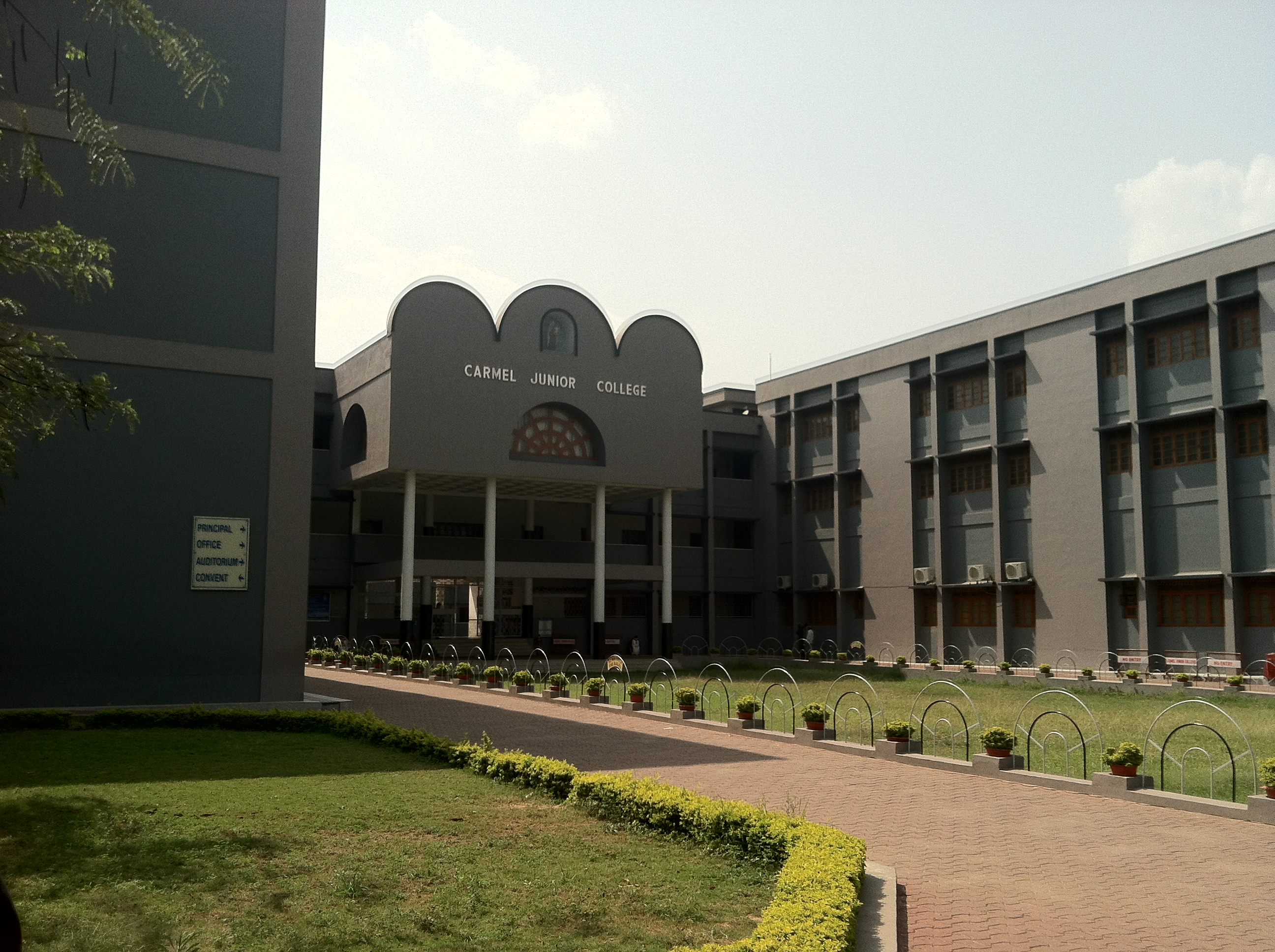

Location
- Balvihar & Sonari Gurudwara; Jamshedpur, Jharkhand, 831011; India; 22.8261°N 86.1692°E

Information
- School type: Private, Comprehensive
- Motto: "Excellence Our Endeavour"
- Patron saint: Venerable Mother Mary Veronica of the Passion
- Established: 3 March 1997; 29 years ago
- Founder: Sister Flavian A.C.
- Status: Open
- Sister school: Sacred Heart Convent School
- School board: ICSE
- School district: East Singbhum
- Authority: Sisters of the Apostolic Carmel
- Principal: Sister M. Natasha, A.C.
- Student to teacher ratio: 1:53
- Language: English
- Colour
- Nickname: CJC
- Publication: The Third Eye
- Affiliation: Council for the Indian School Certificate Education
- Website: cjcollege.com

Carmel Junior College, Sonari is an English Medium Co-educational School, operated by the Sisters of the Apostolic Carmel Congregation. The congregation of the Apostolic Carmel has several schools in India and abroad in which young people belonging to every creed, social class, community and linguistic group are educated through the medium of English and the regional languages. These institutions are part of the Catholic Church’s effort to share in the country’s educational endeavor. While particularly responsible to the Christian community, the school welcomes applicants from all creeds and beliefs.

== History ==
Carmel Junior College is a Christian School established and administered by the congregation of the Apostolic Carmel Sisters in the Catholic Church. The school is under the religious jurisdiction of the Bishop of Jamshedpur. The school was opened on 3 March 1997. It was founded by Sister Flavian AC at Bal-Vihar, Sonari.

== Curriculum ==
The medium of instruction is English but emphasis is given to Hindi, the official language of the state, together with the essential subjects : Sanskrit, History, Geography, Social studies, Mathematics, Physics, Chemistry, Biology, Physical Training, Computer Application, Economics Application, and Fine Arts. The school has laboratories for science, modern computer Labs and libraries.

== Extracurricular activities ==
The school offers a wide range of activities. The school fields Football, Cricket, Volleyball, Handball and Basketball teams in all the inter-school competitions. Members of these teams have represented the district and state several times over the years. As all schools have activities (co-Curricular activities) are no longer part of its regular classes expect for important inter-school activities.

Students also participate in chess tournaments, and each year the school hosts a Grandparents Day and a dance contest.

The school organizes the following inter-school events:

Event	Organising Body	Occurrence
Blitz	The Interact Club	Annual
Cascading Sounds	The Jyoti Club	Annual
Carmel Summit	The Legal Literacy Club	Annual
Aura	The School Cabinet	Variable
Greenade	The Go-Green Club	Variable
Biblica (Catholic Fest)	The School Management	Variable
Ecorsa	The Economics and Business Department	Annual
Provoke	The Computer Club	Annual

However, only "Biblica" and "Carmel Summit" are fixed annual events while others happen at sporadically.

== Clubs ==
All ventures have been divided into clubs. The school has four active clubs. The clubs are led by a President, assisted by a Vice- President and are guided by at least two teacher moderators.

== Publications ==
The school's first publication is "The Seed was Sown". The School also had several other minor publications like "Soldiers of God". However, from 2013 the school started its annual magazine "The Third Eye".

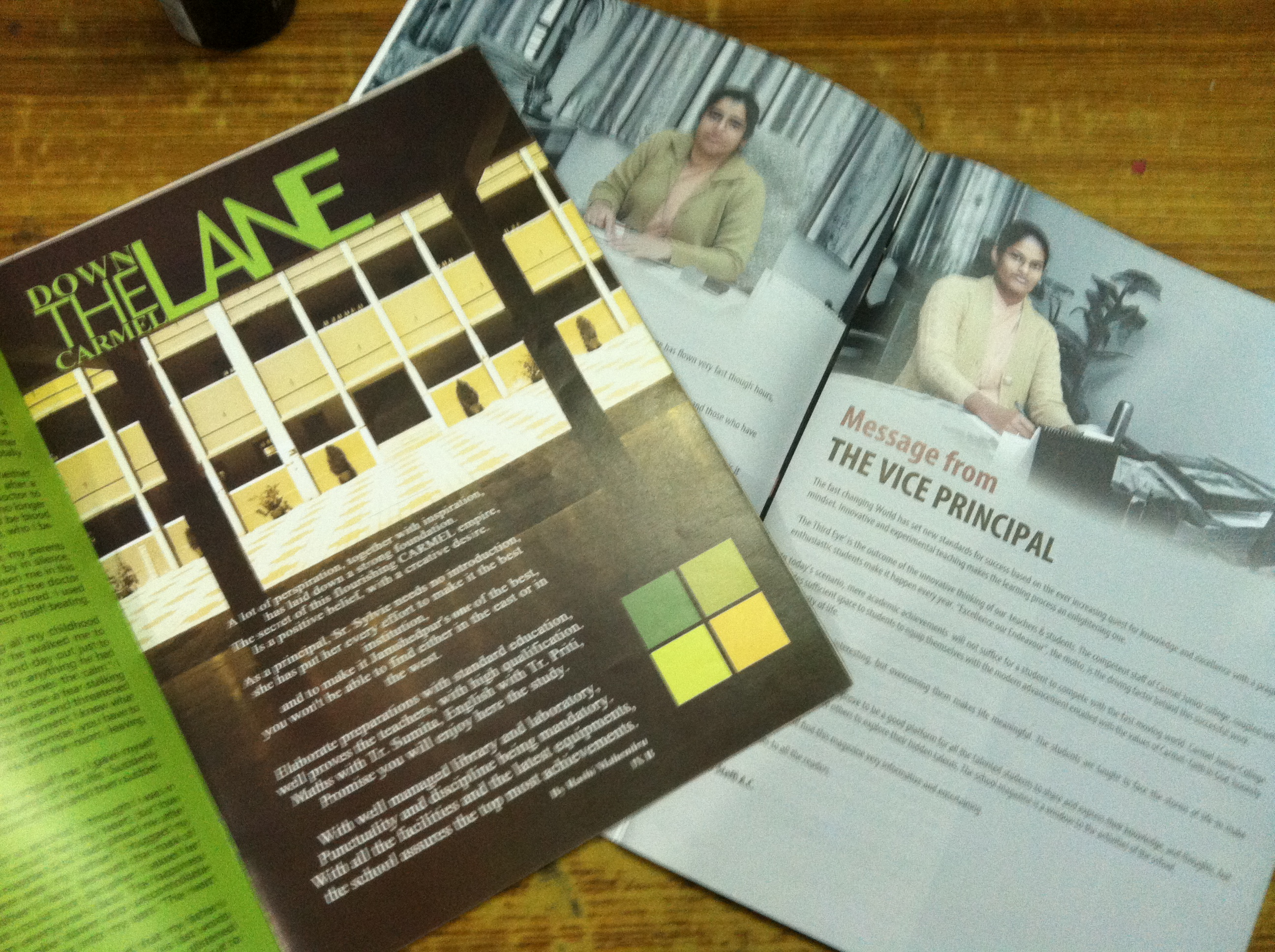
First and Second issue of The Third Eye which were printed in the years 2013 and 2014.

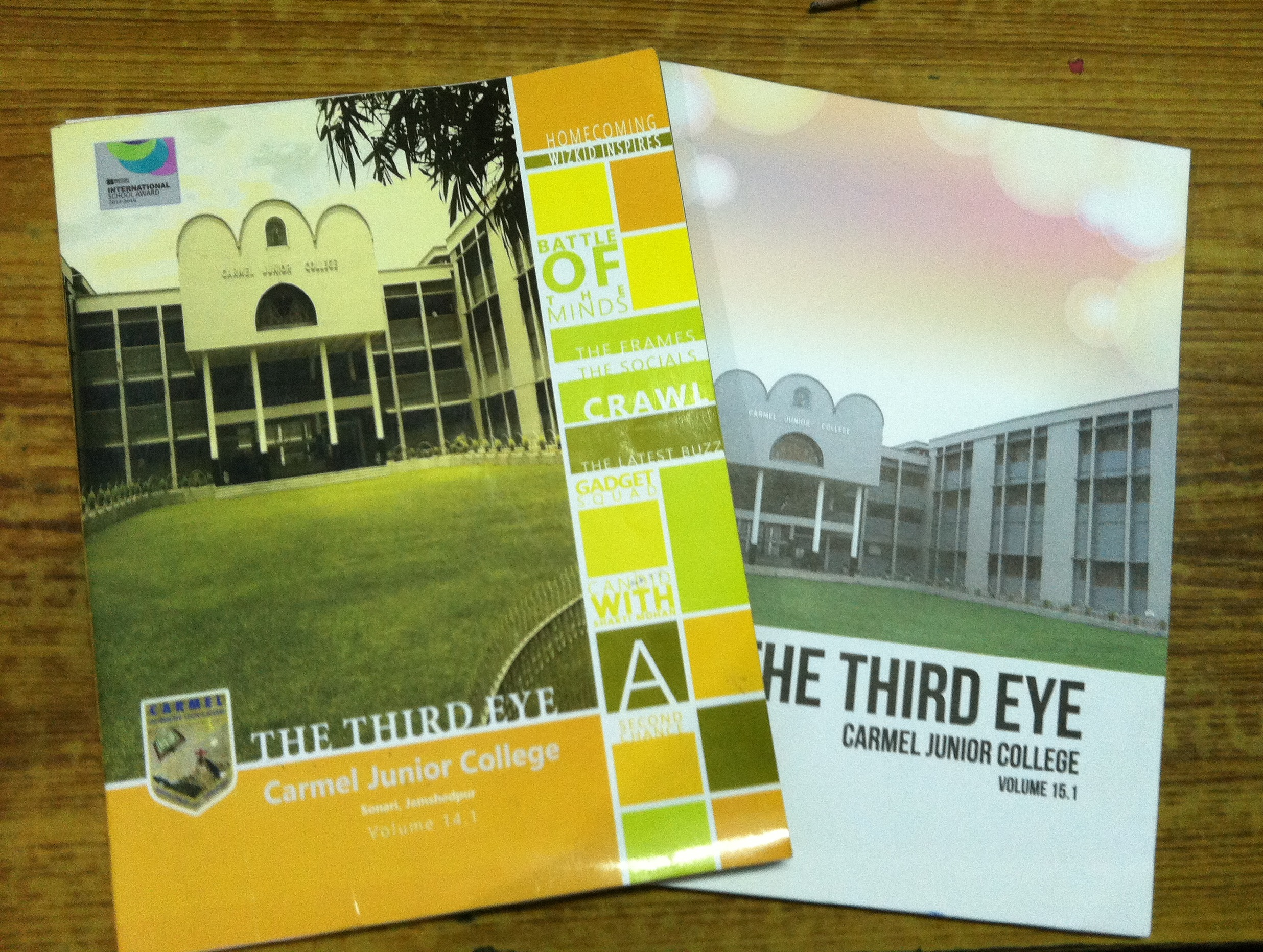
First and Second issue of The Third Eye which were published in the years 2013 and 2014.
