= Jamshedpur =

City in Jharkhand, India

Jamshedpur Tatanagar
- Metropolis
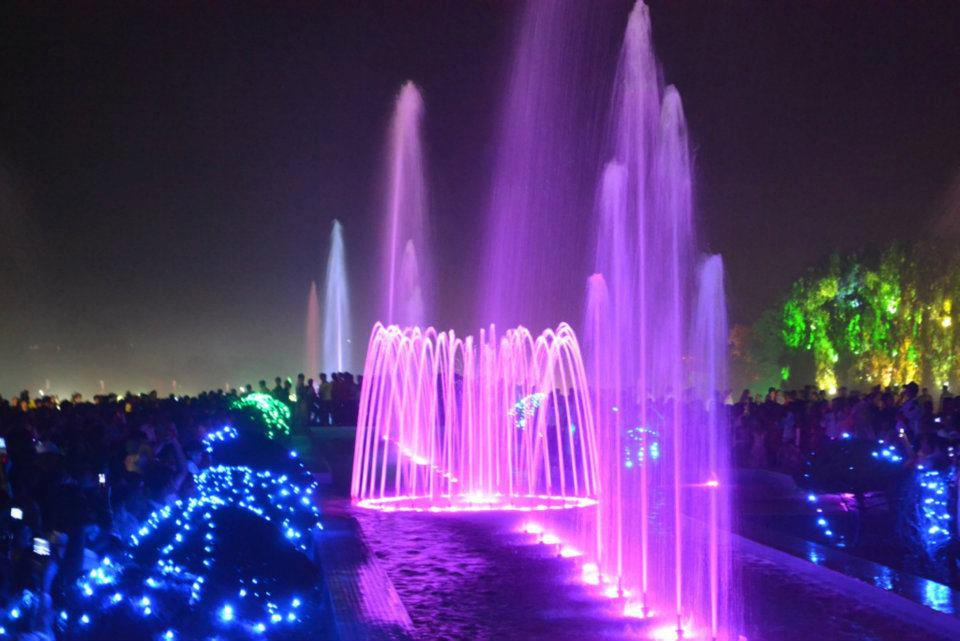
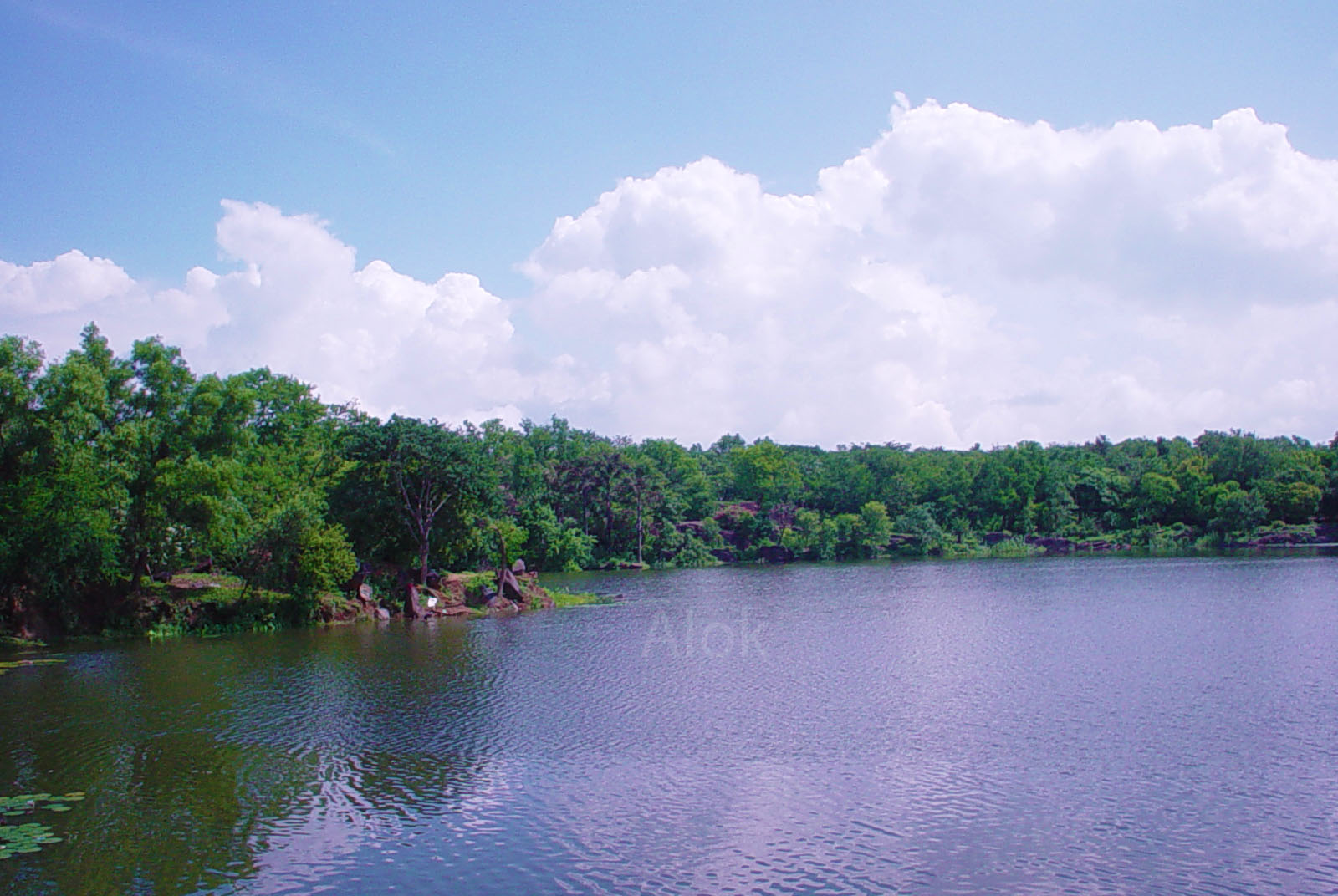
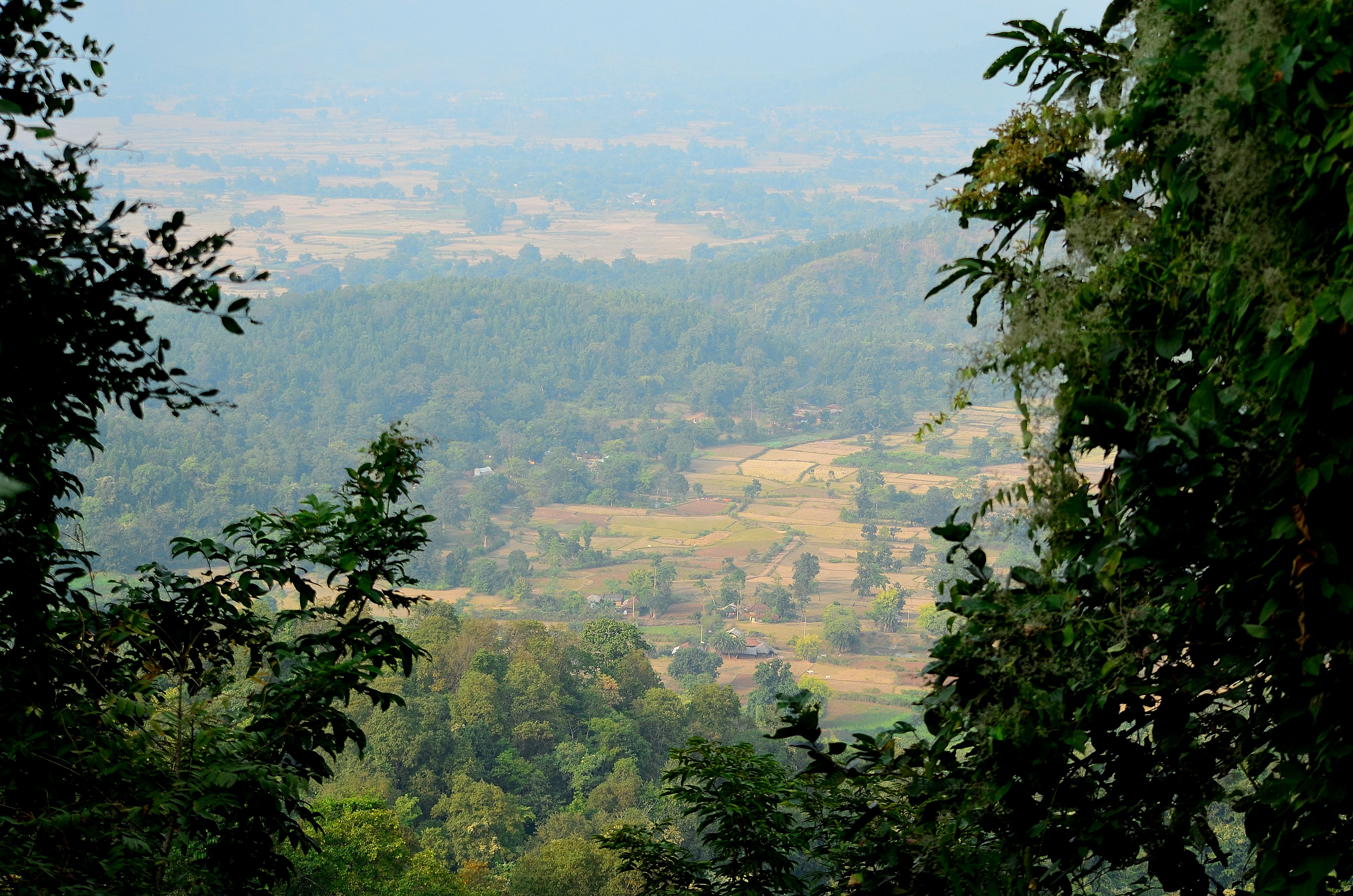
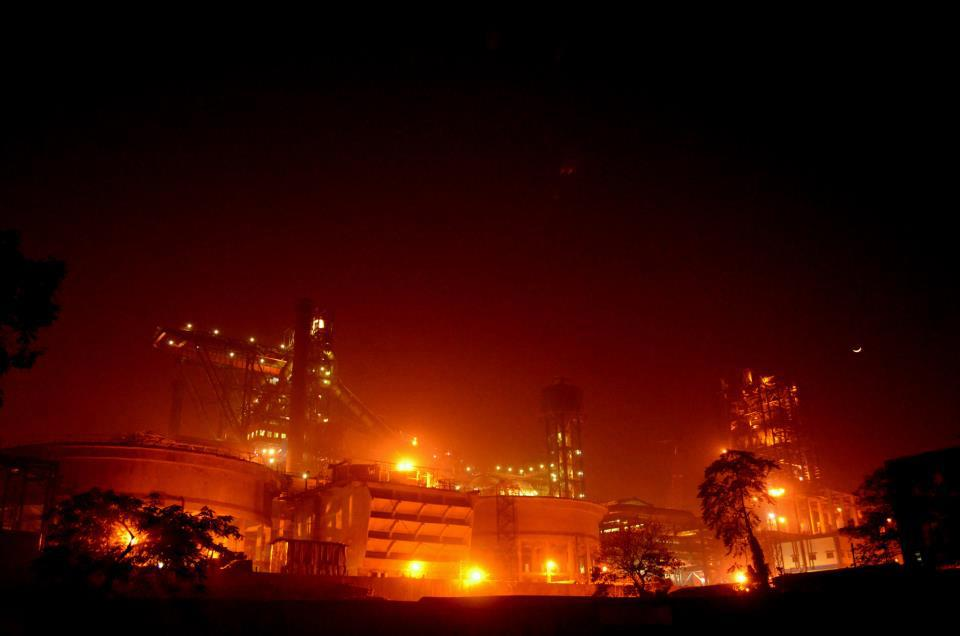
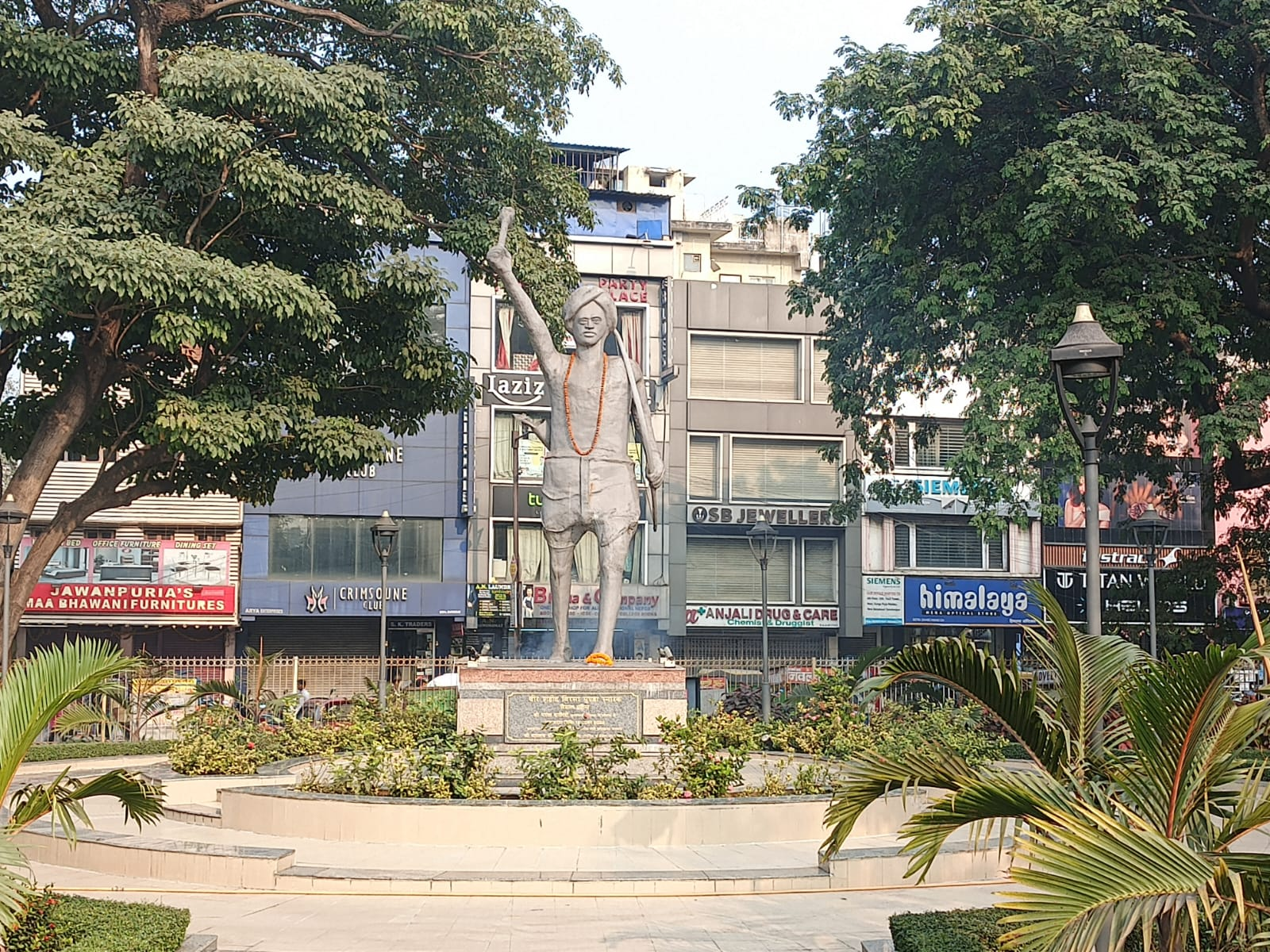
- City view Jubilee park Hudco lake Dalma Hills Tata steel factory P&M Mall Statue of Birsa Munda
- Nickname: 'Steel City of India'
- Interactive map of Jamshedpur
- Location of Jamshedpur in Jharkhand Jamshedpur (India)
- Coordinates: 22°47′33″N 86°11′03″E
- Country: India
- State: Jharkhand
- District: East Singhbhum Seraikela-Kharsawan
- Established: 1919
- Founder: Jamsetji Tata
- Named for: Jamsetji Tata

Government
  - Body: Jamshedpur Notified Area Committee (JNAC)
  - MP: Bidyut Baran Mahato (BJP)
  - Senior Superintendent of Police: Piyush Pandey (IPS)
  - Deputy Commissioner: Karn Satyarthi (IAS)

Area
  - Metropolis: 224 km^{2} (86 sq mi)
- Elevation: 159 m (522 ft)

Population (2011)
  - Urban: 629,659
  - Metro: 1,337,131
- Demonym: Jamshedpurian

Languages
  - Official: Hindi and English
  - Second language: Nagpuri, Bengali, Odia, Santhali, Urdu, Magahi, Bhojpuri, Kurmali
- Time zone: UTC+5:30 (IST)
- PIN: 831001 to 831020 832101 to 832110
- Telephone code: +91-657
- Vehicle registration: JH-05 (East Singhbhum District) JH-22 (Seraikela-Kharsawan District)
- Literacy: 89.41%
- Domestic Airport: Sonari Airport Dhalbhumgarh Airport
- Website: jamshedpur.nic.in

Jamshedpur (Hindi: [d͡ʒəmˈʃeːd̪pʊɾ]; Bengali: [ˈd͡ʒamʃedpuɾ]), also known as Tatanagar, is a major industrial city in eastern India. Located on the confluence of the Swarnarekha and Kharkai rivers, the city is surrounded by the Dalma Hills. It is the largest city in the state of Jharkhand. With a population of 629,658 in the city limits and 1.3 million in the wider metropolitan area, Jamshedpur is the third largest metropolitan area in the region and 36th largest urban area in the country and 72nd most populous city in the country.

The modern industrial city of Jamshedpur was built over the village of Sakchi by Dorabji Tata, who chose the location for his father Jamshedji Tata's planned steel city. The project began in 1908, with the steel plant operating by 1912, and the city was formally named Jamshedpur by Lord Chelmsford in 1919 in honor of Jamshedji. During World War I, Tata Steel supplied for British military campaigns across the Middle East and Africa. In World War II, Jamshedpur was a high-value target. This led to the deployment of British and American troops in the region, establishment of air bases to repel potential Japanese attacks, maintain links with mainland China via the Burma Road and participate in the U.S-led bombing campaign in Japan. The city's history is embedded with frequent labor unrest and strikes, visits by well-known figures and independence movements.

Following the independence of India in 1947, Jamshedpur became part of the state of Bihar. It experienced spells of growth and development alongside occasions of unrest, violence and terrorism. The city experienced deadly communal violence in 1964 and 1979 and a spillover of the 1984 anti-Sikh riots. By the 1990s, organized crime increased, and mafia activities emerged in northern Jamshedpur, with notable gang wars and the assassination of well-known figures in political and business circles. The intensity of crime nearly brought about the collapse of industries in Jamshedpur. The state government intervened. Between 1994 and 1996, the city police under Ajoy Kumar, launched a crackdown on gangs, which led to a decline in crime. Subsequently, Jamshedpur became an important stronghold for the statehood movement. Thus on 15 November 2000, the city became part of the state of Jharkhand.

A major commercial and industrial centre in India, Jamshedpur is home to major heavy industries. It is a demographically diverse city. It has been ranked consistently as one of the cleanest cities in India by Swach Survekshan, 2nd in India in terms of quality of life, one of the fastest-growing global cities in the world and one of the first smart cities in India along with Naya Raipur. It is a local popular tourist destination known for its forests and ancient temples. Jamshedpur is the only million plus city in India without a municipal corporation.

== Etymology ==
In 1919 Lord Chelmsford named the city, which was previously a village called Sakchi, Jamshedpur in honour of its founder, Jamshedji Nausserwanji Tata, whose birthday is celebrated on 3 March as Founder's Day. J.N. Tata had written to his son Dorabji Tata about his vision of a great city in the area. On Founders Day, the 225-acre (0.91 km^{2}) Jubilee Park is decorated with brilliant lightwork for about a week.

The city has several nicknames including "Steel City" (which was referenced during TATA Steel's "Green City—Clean City—Steel City" campaign); "Tatanagar" after the name of its railway station Tatanagar Railway Station or simply "Tata" in deference to the presence of Tata companies. At one time it was also known as "Kalimati" (meaning "Land of Goddess Kali") after the village near the Sakchi area. Sakchi was merged into Jamshedpur as a neighbourhood in 1919. The only trace of the name is the main road through Sakchi area of Jamshedpur which is named Kalimati Road.

== History ==
=== Foundation ===
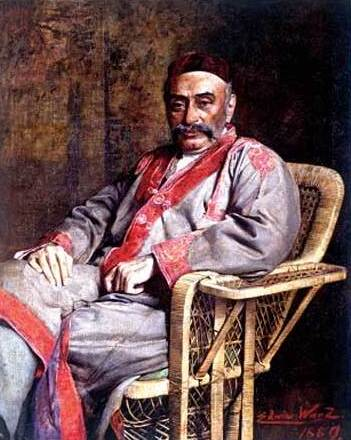
Jamshedji Tata, founder of Tata Group

At the end of 19th century, Jamshedji Nusserwanji Tata met steel makers in Pittsburgh to get the most advanced technology for his plant. It is said that he got the idea of building a steel plant after hearing Thomas Carlyle declare in a lecture in Manchester that "the nation which gains control of iron soon acquires the control of gold". At the turn of the twentieth century, Tata asked geologist Charles Page Perin to help him find the site to build India's first steel plant. The search for a site rich in iron, coal, limestone and water began in April 1904 in today's Madhya Pradesh.

The prospectors C. M. Weld, Dorabji Tata and Shapurji Saklatvala, took nearly three years in a painstaking search across vast stretches of inhospitable terrain to find a location. One day they came across a village called Sakchi, on the densely forested stretches of the Chota Nagpur plateau, near the confluence of the Subarnarekha and Kharkai rivers. It seemed to be the ideal choice and the place was selected. In 1908 the construction of the plant as well as the city officially began. The first steel ingot was rolled on 16 February 1912.

The city's construction continued. Jamshedji's plan for the city was clear. He envisioned far more than a mere row of workers hutments. He insisted upon building all the comforts and conveniences a city could provide. As a result, many areas in the city are well planned and there are public leisure places such as the Jubilee Park and Dimna Lake. While building the city, Jamshedji Tata had said,

"Be sure to lay wide streets planted with shady trees, every other of a quick-growing variety. Be sure that there is plenty of space for lawns and gardens; reserve large areas for football, hockey and parks; earmark areas for Hindu temples, Muslim mosques and Christian churches."

— Jamsetji Tata

Messrs Julin Kennedy Sahlin from Pittsburgh prepared the first layout of the town of Jamshedpur. What the city looks like today is a testament to his visionary plans. In 1919, the industrial neighbourhood was merged to form Jamshedpur according to Jamsetji Tata, the founder of the industrial establishment. As a tribute to the company's contribution in the war, on the day of city's official opening, Lord Chelmsford visited and named Jamshedpur, in honour of Jamshedji Tata.

=== British colonial era ===
The first world war began in August 1914. It rapidly escalated to West Asia centring on the Suez Canal of Egypt and from there to the region of Mesopotamia, now called Iraq and then extended to East Africa, Palestine and rest of the Middle East. Nearly 1,500 miles of rail and 3,00,000 tonnes of steel produced in Jamshedpur were used in military campaigns across Mesopotamia, Egypt, Salonica and East Africa. After the end of the war in 1919, the company received warm acclaim from Britain.

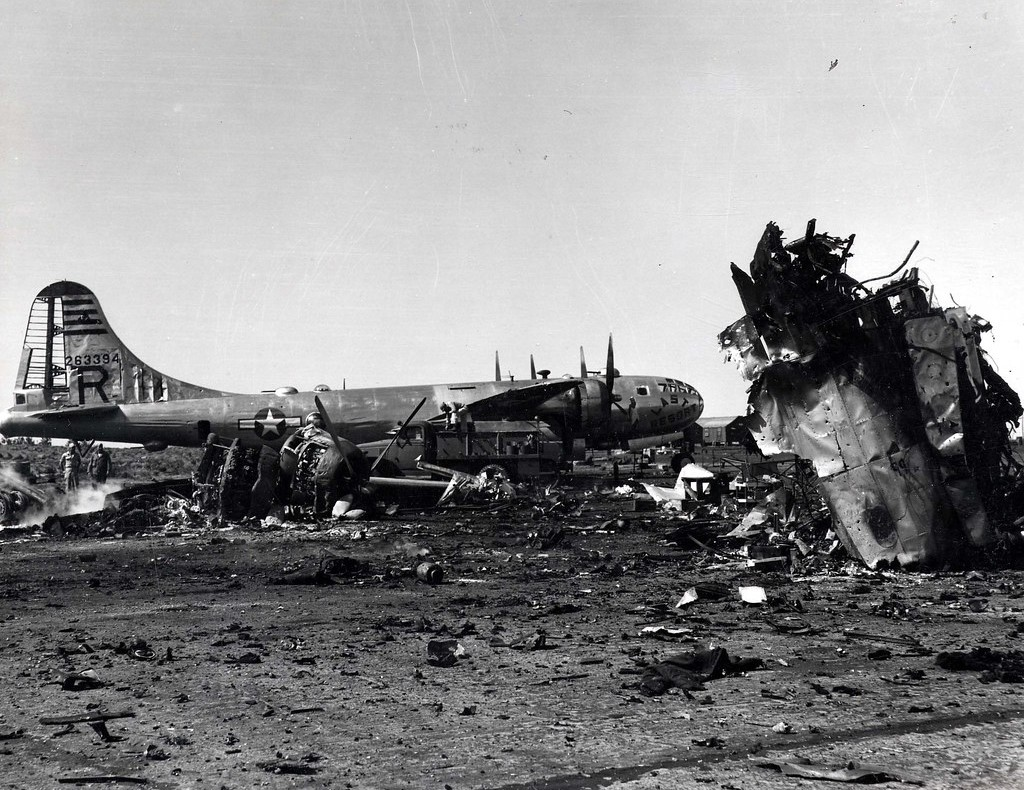
A bomb unloading accident at Chakulia, 1945

World War II started in 1939 in the European countries and extended to the Middle East and rest of Asia. The city was a high-value target for Japan during the war. The British government sought to protect the city from attacks. Several bomb shelters were set up across the city, while anti-aircraft guns were placed on the outskirts. British and American troops were brought into Jamshedpur. Additional airfields were built at Chakulia and Kalaikunda, surrounded by several underground bunkers. A series of wheeled armoured carriers, known as 'Tatanagars', contributing to the war effort, were manufactured in Jamshedpur. Between 1940 and 1944, a total of 4,655 Tatanagar units were produced at the Railway workshop in Jamshedpur. In 1945, Tata Motors was established as "Tata Engineering & Locomotive", by purchasing the railway workshop.

=== Contemporary ===
An event reminiscent of the 1919 Jallianwala Bagh massacre took place near Jamshedpur on 1 January 1948. Over 50,000 people assembled in Kharsawan and protested against the merger of Kharsawan. The Orissa Military Police opened fire on the crowd, resulting in a massacre. Aftermath of the incident, the bodies were disposed of in wells and in the jungle, many injured were left untreated. Official records state 35 deaths, but other sources, like P.K. Deo's "Memoir of a Bygone Era," suggest numbers as high as 2,000.

A violent strike occurred in May 1958 by the communist-led union of the Tata Steel. The state government declared it illegal and within a week, the violence escalated into firing, looting, arson, curfew and movement of federal troops. According to the company, 4 people were killed and 114 people were injured. About 400 people were discharged and 335,000 man-days off work and 45,000 tons of steel production lost before mid-July when the steel plant returned to normal production.

In the mid-1960s, thousands of Hindus escaped anti-Hindu violence in East Pakistan (now Bangladesh) and sought refuge in India, which caused communal tensions in the region. The theft of a religious relic, believed to be a hair of Prophet Mohammed in Srinagar caused brutal riots in Jamshedpur. This led to a chain of protests, resulting deadly riots where 134 people were killed in Calcutta, Rourkela, and Jamshedpur. However, it is believed that the actual death toll was in the thousands. After the riots, Rashtriya Swayamsevak Sangh-affiliated groups were finally able to take root in Jamshedpur. During the riots, some of the Muslims living in company's residential quarters were killed, which gave birth to new Muslim neighborhoods in north Jamshedpur.

In April 1979, Jamshedpur experienced a deadly Hindu-Muslim violence influenced by the presence of Hindu and Muslim communal forces. It was the first major riot on the occasion of Ram Navami. 108 people were killed in the riot, among whom 79 Muslims and 25 Hindus were identified. A notable figure among the victims was Zaki Anwar, a popular secularist. Aftermath of the riot, Muslim-populated suburbs expanded in the north.

Legend has it that in the late 1980s when the state government proposed a law to end the Tatas' administration of Jamshedpur and bring the city under a municipality, the local populace rose in protest and defeated the government's proposal. In 2005, a similar proposal was once again put up by lobbying politicians. The target audience was the working class. A large majority sided with the government and set up protest meetings outside the East-Singhbhum Deputy Commissioner's office. However, the objective was never achieved and Jamshedpur remains without a municipality.

On 15 November 2000, Jamshedpur became part of new state called Jharkhand. There are wide roads, shady trees on the roadside, Dimna Dam for drinking water supply near the city, 24-hour uninterrupted electricity supply. Apart from this, many national level institutes like Shavak Nanavati Technical Institute, National Institute of Technology, National Metallurgy Laboratory, MGM Medical College, Al Kabir Polytechnic College are operating here. At present, Tata Steel is the country's largest private steel production company producing 11 million tons of steel. Jamshedpur is the only city in the country whose basic facilities are taken care of by a private company.

== Geography ==
Jamshedpur
M: municipal town, F: facility, N: neighbourhood, W: works, factory, C: educational/ research centre
Owing to space constraints in the small map, the actual locations in a larger map may vary slightly
Places marked on this map, which have a separate page, are linked in the larger full-scale map.
For map of Jamshedpur Urban Agglomeration see Mango or Adityapur page.

Jamshedpur is situated at the southern end of the state of Jharkhand and is bordered by the states of Odisha and West Bengal. The average elevation of the city is 135 metres while the range is from 129 m to 151 m. Total geographical area of Jamshedpur is 224 km square. Jamshedpur is primarily located in a hilly region and is surrounded by the Dalma Hills running from west to east and covered with dense forests. The other smaller hill ranges near the city are Ukam Hill and the Jadugoda-musabani hill range. The city is also a part of the larger Chota Nagpur Plateau region. The region is formed of sedimentary, metamorphic and igneous rocks belonging to the Dharwarian period.

Jamshedpur is located at the confluence of the Kharkai and Subarnarekha Rivers. Subarnarekha is the principal river of Jamshedpur, which flows from the west to the south-eastern part of the territory. Many small rivers, especially the tributaries, join the Subarnarekha River in this area. The Kharkai flows from the south and joins the Subarnarekha River at a place called Domuhani. The two rivers are the city's major sources of drinking water and groundwater. Several lakes of varying sizes are also located near the city's fringes. The major of them being the Dimna Lake located in between the Dalma range and the Sitarampur reservoir situated beside the Kharkai River. It is also a major tourist spot in the region. Both of them also act as reservoirs for drinking water in the city. The city falls under a deciduous type of forest region and the green cover is estimated to be around 33% of the total land area. The city falls under the Seismic Zone II region. Jamshedpur has many parks around it. Jubilee Park at Sakchi is the largest park in Jamshedpur. It was built by Jamshedji Tata, who was inspired by Vrindavanan Gardens of Mysore.

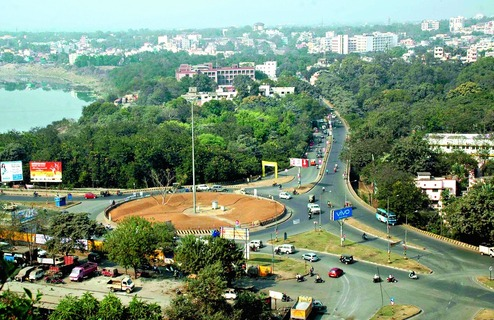
Cityscapes of Jamshedpur

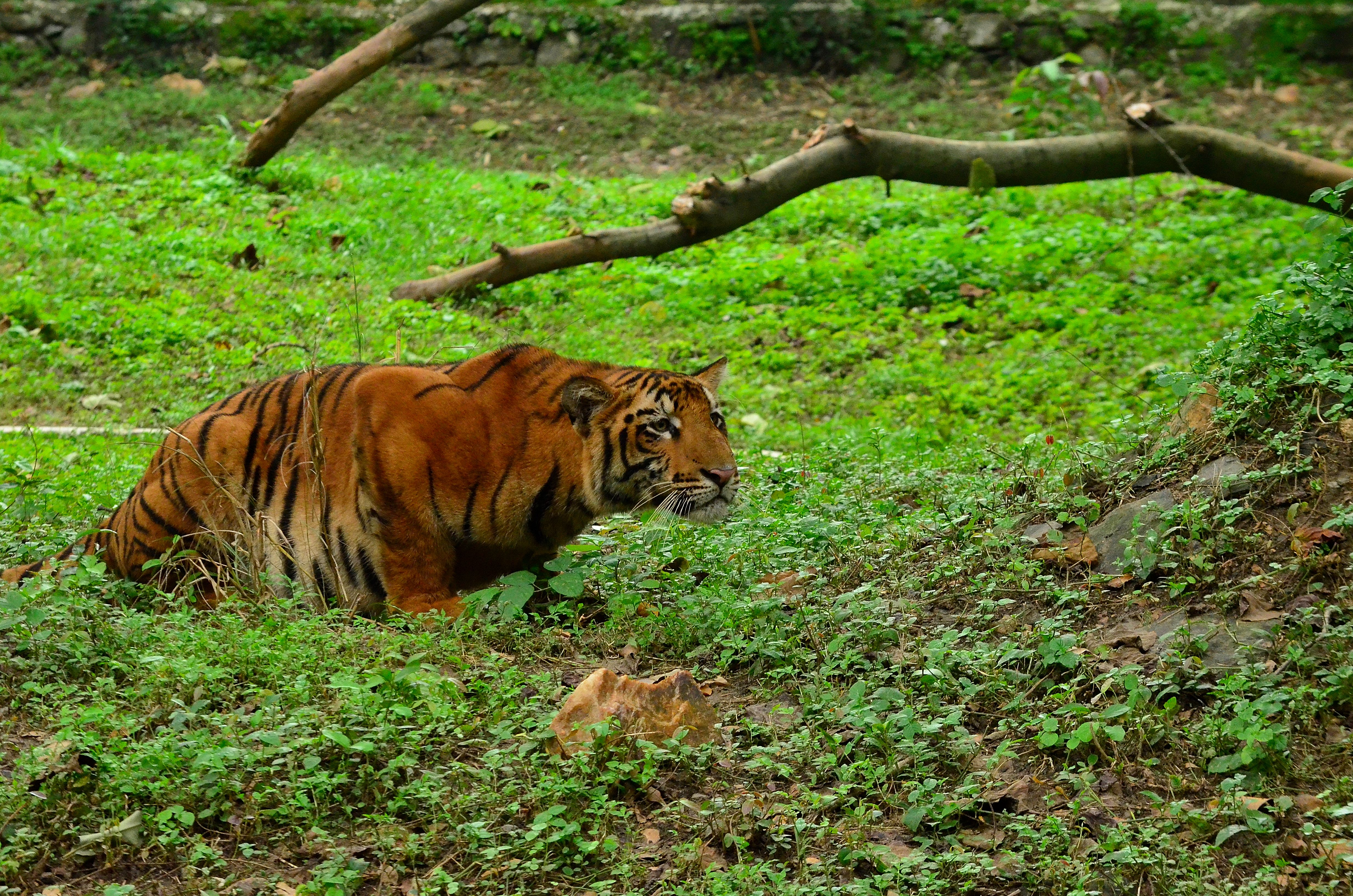
Bengal tiger at Tata Steel Zoological Park

=== Climate ===
Climate data for Jamshedpur (1991–2020)
| Month | Jan | Feb | Mar | Apr | May | Jun | Jul | Aug | Sep | Oct | Nov | Dec | Year |
|---|---|---|---|---|---|---|---|---|---|---|---|---|---|
| Record high °C (°F) | 34.6 (94.3) | 38.6 (101.5) | 42.4 (108.3) | 46.2 (115.2) | 46.5 (115.7) | 46.6 (115.9) | 39.7 (103.5) | 36.7 (98.1) | 36.5 (97.7) | 36.2 (97.2) | 36.2 (97.2) | 32.5 (90.5) | 46.5 (115.7) |
| Mean daily maximum °C (°F) | 26.7 (80.1) | 30.2 (86.4) | 35.2 (95.4) | 39.2 (102.6) | 38.6 (101.5) | 36.4 (97.5) | 32.7 (90.9) | 32.3 (90.1) | 32.2 (90.0) | 32.0 (89.6) | 29.8 (85.6) | 27.1 (80.8) | 32.8 (91.0) |
| Mean daily minimum °C (°F) | 10.5 (50.9) | 14.6 (58.3) | 18.7 (65.7) | 23.5 (74.3) | 25.3 (77.5) | 25.9 (78.6) | 25.2 (77.4) | 25.0 (77.0) | 24.5 (76.1) | 21.6 (70.9) | 15.9 (60.6) | 11.6 (52.9) | 20.3 (68.5) |
| Record low °C (°F) | 4.4 (39.9) | 6.4 (43.5) | 10.6 (51.1) | 16.2 (61.2) | 17.7 (63.9) | 16.4 (61.5) | 19.8 (67.6) | 18.4 (65.1) | 19.2 (66.6) | 11.2 (52.2) | 8.2 (46.8) | 4.5 (40.1) | 4.4 (39.9) |
| Average rainfall mm (inches) | 11.5 (0.45) | 12.4 (0.49) | 24.0 (0.94) | 21.9 (0.86) | 77.7 (3.06) | 191.1 (7.52) | 283.3 (11.15) | 271.8 (10.70) | 203.8 (8.02) | 93.7 (3.69) | 13.1 (0.52) | 6.2 (0.24) | 1,210.5 (47.66) |
| Average rainy days | 1.2 | 1.0 | 1.9 | 2.3 | 5.1 | 8.2 | 13.5 | 12.6 | 9.0 | 4.4 | 0.9 | 0.9 | 61.1 |
| Average relative humidity (%) (at 17:30 IST) | 52 | 40 | 32 | 32 | 46 | 64 | 77 | 80 | 78 | 71 | 66 | 62 | 58 |
Source: India Meteorological Department

Climate data for Jamshedpur City (1991–2020, extremes 1924–2020)
| Month | Jan | Feb | Mar | Apr | May | Jun | Jul | Aug | Sep | Oct | Nov | Dec | Year |
|---|---|---|---|---|---|---|---|---|---|---|---|---|---|
| Record high °C (°F) | 33.4 (92.1) | 39.4 (102.9) | 42.6 (108.7) | 46.2 (115.2) | 47.7 (117.9) | 47.2 (117.0) | 40.0 (104.0) | 38.0 (100.4) | 37.9 (100.2) | 38.2 (100.8) | 36.2 (97.2) | 33.5 (92.3) | 47.7 (117.9) |
| Mean daily maximum °C (°F) | 27.1 (80.8) | 30.8 (87.4) | 35.8 (96.4) | 39.6 (103.3) | 39.0 (102.2) | 35.9 (96.6) | 32.9 (91.2) | 32.9 (91.2) | 32.8 (91.0) | 32.9 (91.2) | 30.7 (87.3) | 28.1 (82.6) | 33.2 (91.8) |
| Mean daily minimum °C (°F) | 11.5 (52.7) | 15.1 (59.2) | 19.8 (67.6) | 24.4 (75.9) | 26.1 (79.0) | 26.3 (79.3) | 26.1 (79.0) | 25.9 (78.6) | 25.3 (77.5) | 22.9 (73.2) | 16.8 (62.2) | 12.4 (54.3) | 21.0 (69.8) |
| Record low °C (°F) | 3.9 (39.0) | 5.0 (41.0) | 10.3 (50.5) | 16.0 (60.8) | 19.0 (66.2) | 21.0 (69.8) | 21.4 (70.5) | 21.4 (70.5) | 18.7 (65.7) | 11.2 (52.2) | 6.1 (43.0) | 4.5 (40.1) | 3.9 (39.0) |
| Average rainfall mm (inches) | 11.1 (0.44) | 16.6 (0.65) | 21.7 (0.85) | 33.2 (1.31) | 84.2 (3.31) | 230.7 (9.08) | 345.7 (13.61) | 329.6 (12.98) | 251.8 (9.91) | 83.6 (3.29) | 7.0 (0.28) | 5.9 (0.23) | 1,421.1 (55.95) |
| Average rainy days | 1.0 | 1.3 | 1.8 | 2.0 | 5.3 | 10.4 | 15.3 | 16.0 | 11.8 | 5.0 | 0.9 | 0.7 | 71.5 |
| Average relative humidity (%) (at 17:30 IST) | 60 | 49 | 41 | 43 | 56 | 71 | 81 | 82 | 82 | 76 | 72 | 69 | 65 |
Source: India Meteorological Department

Jamshedpur has been ranked 13th best "National Clean Air City" (under Category 1 >10L Population cities) in India.

== Cityscape and urban structure ==
Panoramic view of Jamshedpur from the Dalma Hills

India's first planned industrial city, Jamshedpur was envisioned by an Indian, planned by an American, named by a British Viceroy and landscaped by a German botanist. Geographically, the city is zoned in central, northern, southern, eastern and western regions. Large neighborhoods are divided into small areas. The central part of Jamshedpur includes old neighborhoods such as Sakchi, Bistupur, Agrico and Golmuri, home to major markets, institutions and landmarks. The south-eastern portion is largely industrial and residential oriented, with major areas such as Telco Colony, Parsudih and Govindpur. Telco Colony is home to major industries such as Tata Motors, Lafarge and Tata Cummins.

Under the framework of the city planning, different roads are built to connect neighborhoods. New Kalimati Road connects Jugsalai and Sakchi, while passing through Golmuri, Kashidih and Garabasa. Bistupur–Sakchi Link Road stretches between Karim City College and Regal Building. Straight Mile Road, the longest arterial road in the city, connects Dhatkidih to Baridih, while passing through Sakchi, Kashidih, Aambagan, Mohammadan Line, Sidhgora, Agrico and Golmuri.

The Western portion of the city has the areas of Adityapur, Gamharia, and Sonari. Sonari is a residential and commercial neighborhood, while Adityapur and Gamharia are the major industrial neighborhoods. Adityapur is also a city and a part of Jamshedpur. Gamharia has an industrial area namely Industrial Area, Gamharia. Adityapur has the Adityapur Industrial Area. There are five national highways crossing the city. Mango Bridge connects the city centre to Mango. Marine Drive is a popular road and picturesque promenade in Jamshedpur. It starts from Sonari and connects Adityapur.

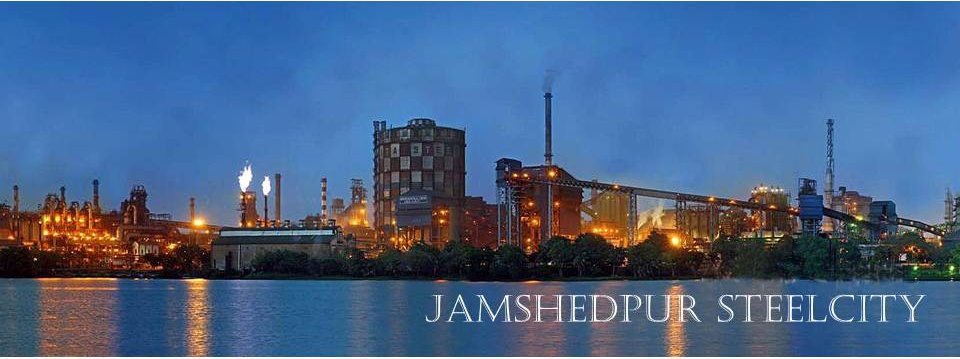
Tata Steel Plant seen from lake

Adityapur has the NIT Jamshedpur.The Burma mines colony has the National Metallurgical Laboratory, a government-owned alloy and metals R&D lab.NML is establishing a magnesium plant using a new indigenous process at Nildih area. The southern part of Jamshedpur contains Jugsalai, Birsanagar, Kadma, Burmamines, TELCO Colony, Bagbera Colony and Jojobera. Jugsalai is the commercial area which is known for the wholesale market. while Birsanagar, Kadma and Bagbera consists of residential and commercial hubs. Burmamines, TELCO Colony, Bagbera Colony and Jojobera are the other main and major industrial areas of the city. Apart from north, whole areas of Jamshedpur has at least one industrial area. Other tall towers are TCE Building and Voltas House. In Jamshedpur, many hi-rise buildings are under construction now. Now the tallest building will be Ashiana Garden Sunflower Block, which will be built at Adityapur. These tall buildings are mostly on the Central and Western side of the city. Jamshedpur has 10 – 14 floors of buildings.

== Demographics ==
=== Population ===
Jamshedpur Metropolitan Area
Population by constituent as per the 2011 census
| Constituent | Type | Population |
| Jamshedpur | Industrial Town | 629,658 |
| Jamshedpur | Notified Area Committee | 629,658 |
| Tatanagar Colony | Outgrowth | 45,986 |
| Mango | Municipal Corporation | 223,805 |
| Adityapur | Municipal Corporation | 174,355 |
| Bagbera Colony | Census Town | 78,356 |
| Chhota Gobindpur | Census Town | 31,843 |
| Haludbani | Census Town | 23,260 |
| Sarjamda | Census Town | 23,788 |
| Gadhra | Census Town | 18,801 |
| Ghorabandha | Census Town | 20,718 |
| Purihasa | Census Town | 7,897 |
| Chota Gamharia | Census Town | 7,505 |
| Jugsalai | Municipal Council | 49,660 |
| Kopali | Municipal Council | 43,256 |
| Total | | 1,337,131 |

Historical population
| Year | Pop. | ±% |
|---|---|---|
| 1911 | 5,672 | — |
| 1921 | 57,360 | +911.3% |
| 1931 | 83,738 | +46.0% |
| 1941 | 148,711 | +77.6% |
| 1951 | 218,162 | +46.7% |
| 1961 | 303,516 | +39.1% |
| 1971 | 356,783 | +17.5% |
| 1981 | 457,061 | +28.1% |
| 1991 | 478,950 | +4.8% |
| 2001 | 612,534 | +27.9% |
| 2011 | 629,659 | +2.8% |
Source: Census of India

According to the 2011 census of India, the city of Jamshedpur had a population of 629,659, but the Jamshedpur Urban Agglomeration had a population of 1,337,131. The city is designated as a Million Plus Urban Agglomeration as per Government terminology. Males constitute 52.1% of the population and females 47.9%. Jamshedpur has an average literacy rate of 89.41% – higher than the national average of 74%. In Jamshedpur, 11.5% of the population is under six years of age.

Jamshedpur Urban Agglomeration includes: Jamshedpur (Industrial Town), Jamshedpur (Notified Area Committee), Tata Nagar Railway Colony (OG), Mango (Municipal Corporation), Jugsalai (Municipal Council), Bagbera (CT), Chhota Gobindpur (CT), Haludbani (CT), Sarjamda (CT), Gadhra (CT), Ghorabandha (CT), Purihasa (CT), Adityapur (Municipal Corporation), Chota Gamahria (CT) and Kapali (Municipal Council).

Jamshedpur's transformation from a rural area to a bustling urban centre owes much to the establishment of Tata Iron and Steel Company Limited in 1907. Initially, its population remained modest until the 1921 census recorded a remarkable growth rate of 911.3%, attributed largely to immigration. People from various parts of India migrated to Jamshedpur in search of opportunities due to industries and eventually settled in nearby areas. This influx diversified the city's demographics, with significant communities from regions like Bengal, Bihar and Odisha contributing to its multicultural character. Moreover, migrants from neighboring cities within Jharkhand also flocked to Jamshedpur for job prospects. Alongside local residents, the city also became home to refugees who arrived during the partition of India, residing in designated colonies.

The 1974 Indian smallpox epidemic was partially traced to economic migrants returning from Jamshedpur. With funding from J.R.D. Tata, the World Health Organization quarantined the city's unvaccinated population, successfully limiting further spread.

=== Language ===
Languages spoken in Jamshedpur city (2011)
1. Hindi (33.2%)
2. Bengali (19.1%)
3. Bhojpuri (11.3%)
4. Odia (7.44%)
5. Urdu (5.55%)
6. Punjabi (4.61%)
7. Magahi (2.84%)
8. Telugu (2.75%)
9. Maithili (2.59%)
10. Ho (1.68%)
11. Chhattisgarhi (1.52%)
12. Santali (1.32%)
13. Other (6.04%)

In Jamshedpur NAC town and outgrowth, six prominent spoken languages, namely Hindi, Bengali, Santali, Bhojpuri, Odia, Urdu, and Punjabi, collectively cover approximately 85 percent of the total population. Other regional languages such as Magahi, Maithili and Chhattisgarhi are also spoken in the town by migrants from Bihar and Chhattisgarh. Though there is a small number of people speaking tribal languages such as Ho and Santali, a large number of them are found in the city's outskirts.

=== Religion and ethnicity ===
Religion in Jamshedpur* (2011)
| Hinduism | 83.67% |
| Islam | 6.95% |
| Sikhism | 4.12% |
| Unclassified Sect. | 2.67% |
| Christianity | 2.24% |
| Other or not stated | 0.35% |

Hindus form the majority religion, numbering 83.67% of Jamshedpur while Muslims (6.95%), Sikhs (4.12%), and Christians (2.24%) form significant minority. Jamshedpur has ethnically diverse Hindu population, such as Bihari, Purvanchali, Bengali and Odias and indigenous tribal groups, such as Santhals and Mundas. Jamshedpur and its surrounding region is home to some of the oldest temples.

Large population of Muslims are in suburbs—Mango (40.85%), Jugsalai (47.95%) and Kopali (88.07%). Significant Muslim population is found in Sakchi, Dhatkidih, Golmuri, Bistupur, and Telco. Majority of Muslims in Jamshedpur are Sunnis and a small number of Shi'as, primarily in Baganshahi. There are around 134 mosques in the city. Central Jama Masjid in Sakchi is the largest mosque.

Jamshedpur is home to one of the largest Sikh communities in India. A large number of Sikhs migrated to the city after the partition of India and the 1984 riots. There are 33 gurudwaras in Jamshedpur. Tribals constitute around 7% of the population, and live in Birsanagar, a very large area covering a major part of Jamshedpur, most of whom are followers of indigenous religions such as Sarna or Christians.

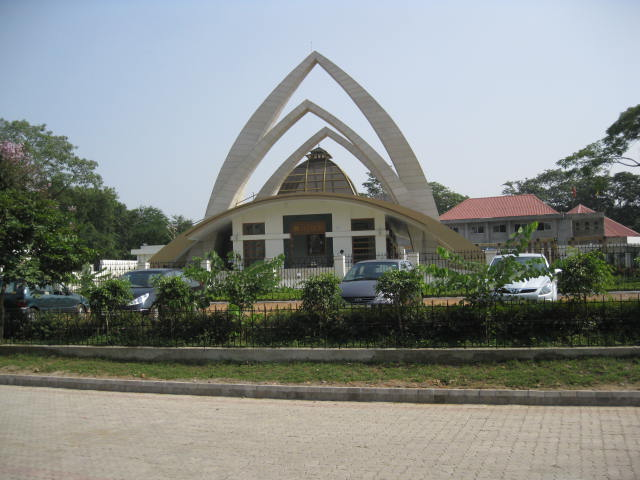
Sai Baba Temple, Bistupur

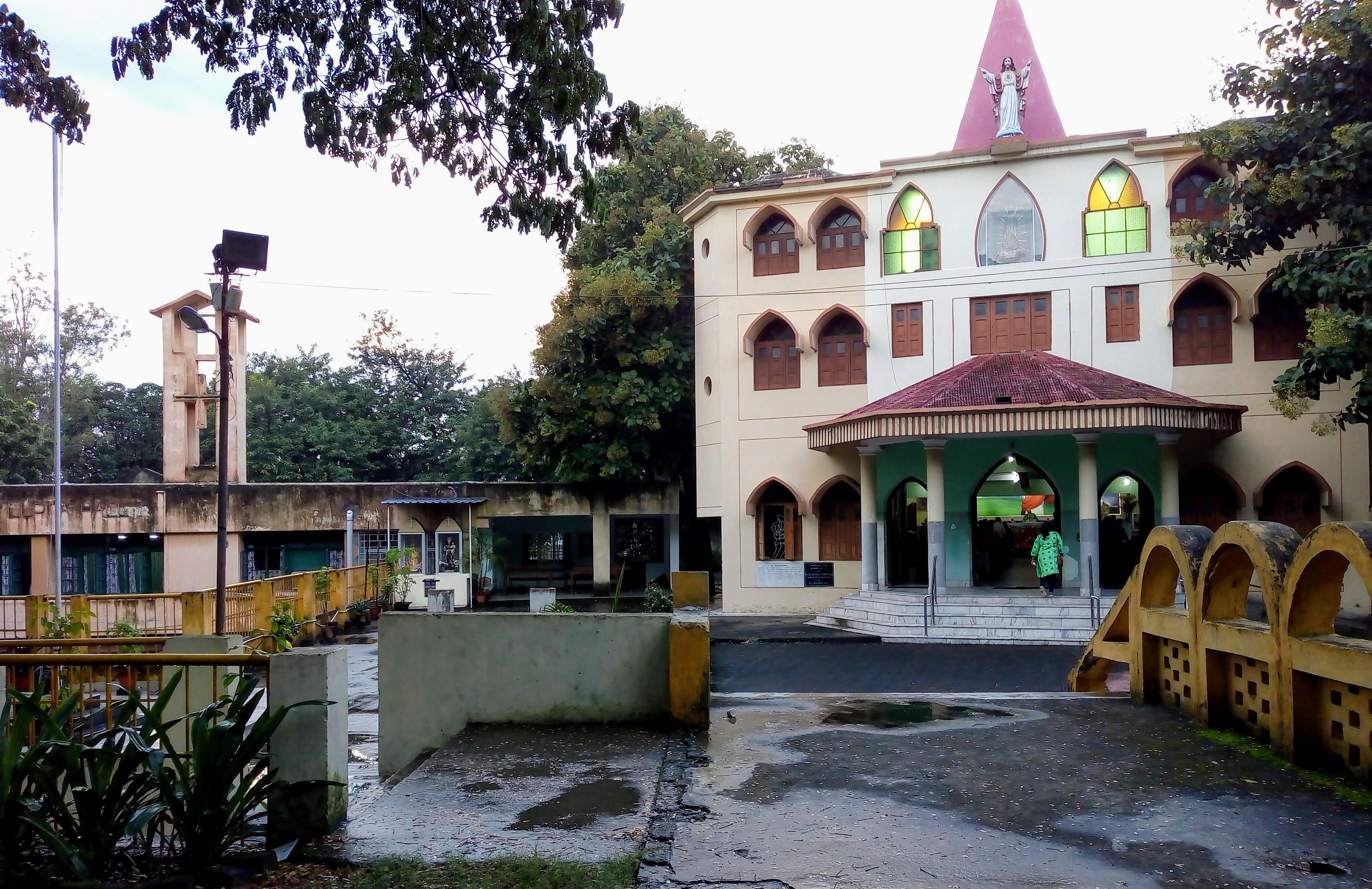
Lupita Church, Telco Colony

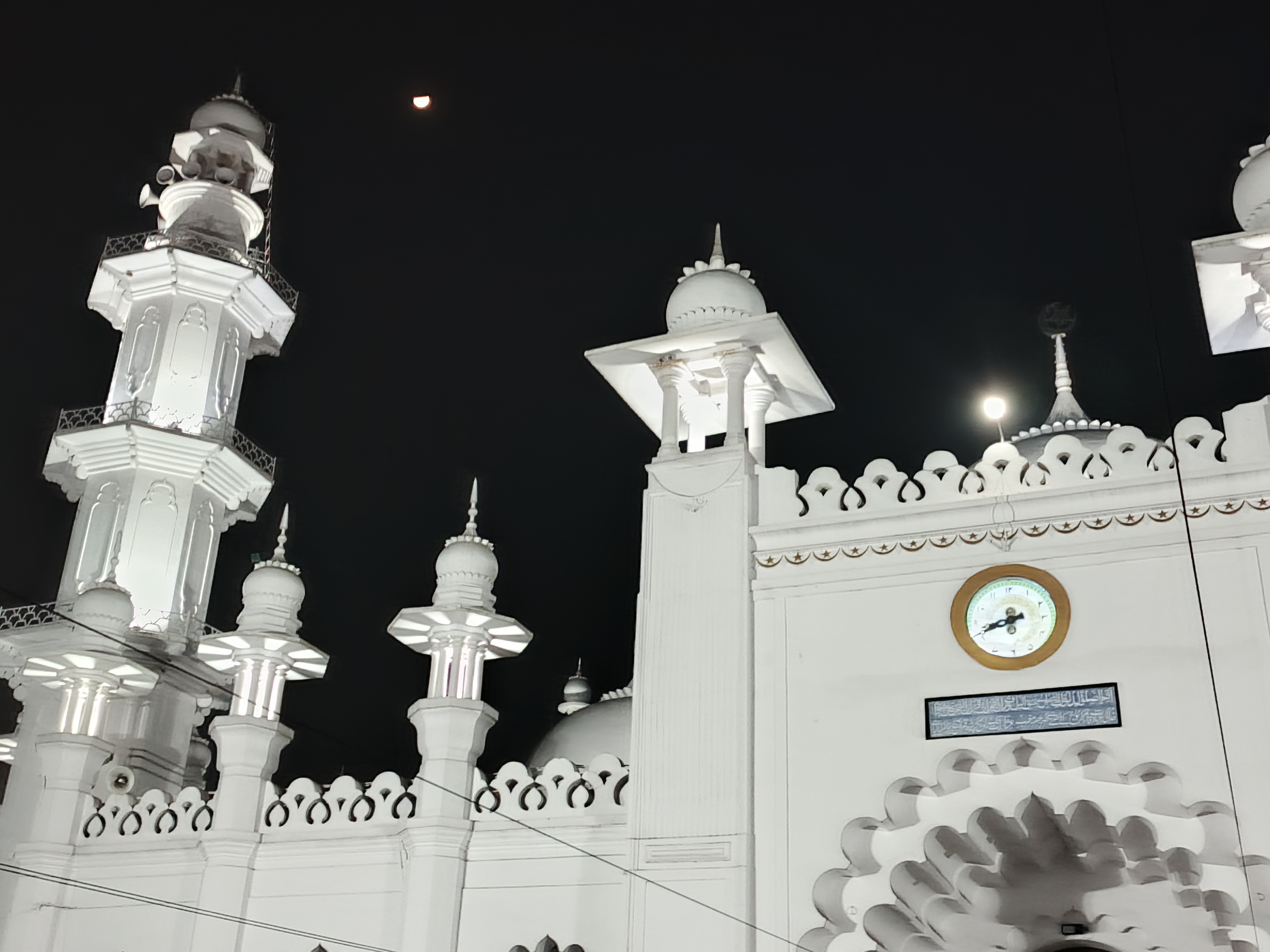
Jama Masjid, Sakchi

== Economy ==
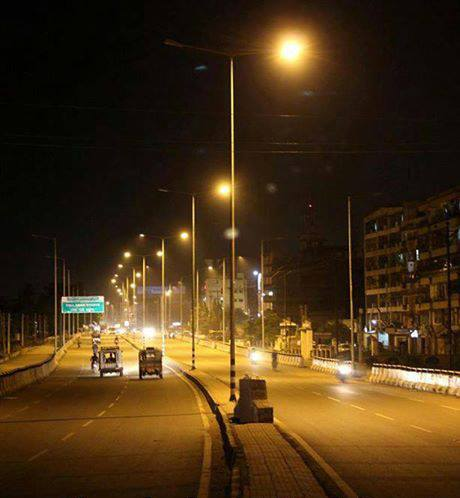
Tata Kandra Road

The largest industry in Jamshedpur is that of Tata Steel. It is situated in the centre of the city and occupies approximately 1/5 of the entire city area. It acts as a pivotal centre for the industries of the city of Jamshedpur with a large number of them having direct or indirect linkages with it. Tata Motors is the second major industry. It is spread over an area of 822 acres (333 ha) in the eastern side of the city. It manufactures Medium and Heavy commercial vehicles and the main components. The company also has its own township commonly known as Telco.

Nuvoco Vistas Corp. Ltd is a cement plant located in Jojobera, Jamshedpur. It is Asia's largest Cement Grinding Unit.

There is a varied and powerful industrial base in the Adityapur Industrial Area. Jamshedpur is regarded as the industrial capital of Jharkhand. Products manufactured are exported to the United States, Australia and Europe.

In a report published in 2021, Jamshedpur was listed among "27 emerging tier-2 and tier-3 cities in India for IT and Engineering services". Tata Consultancy Services has two centers in Jamshedpur at—Bistupur and Sakchi. Essar Group operates BPO center in Mango, employing 2,500 people. A Software Technology Parks of India and electronics manufacturing cluster at Adityapur upon its full fledged operation, would transform the region into an IT cluster. Deloitte, Stream Digital Services and IBM operates smaller offices in the city.

== Arts and culture ==
=== Cinema ===
Jamshedpur has influence on Santali, Hindi, Bhojpuri, Odia and Bengali films. Many films have been shot and based in the city and it is also sometimes called "Mini Mumbai" because of a great cinema culture and producing many film and television artists. Ritwik Ghatak's Subarnarekha (1962) and Dharmendra and Sharmila Tagore-starrer Satyakam (1969) were shot in Ghatsila area and Buddhadeb Dasgupta's Bengali film, Urojohaj (2020) was also shot in outskirts of city. Films such as Udaan (2010), Bubble Gum (2011) and M.S Dhoni: The Untold Story (2016) were based and shot in the city and Udaan was screened in Cannes Film Festival. The movie Dil Bechara (2020), starring Sushant Singh Rajput and John Abraham's directorial Banana were also shot in the city.

== Government ==
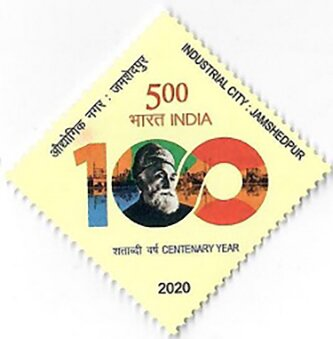
2020 Indian postage stamp commemorating the centenary of the city of Jamshedpur.

The major urban local bodies are in Jamshedpur city:

- Jamshedpur Industrial Town
- Jamshedpur Notified Area Committee (JNAC)
- Mango Municipal Corporation
- Adityapur Municipal Corporation
- Jugsalai Municipal Council
- Kapali Municipal Council

== Education ==
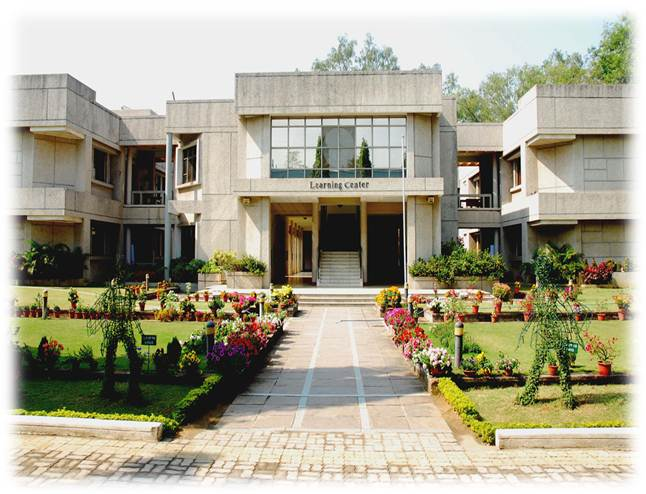
XLRI Campus, Jamshedpur

Education in Jamshedpur is governed by the state ministry of education. Schools in Jamshedpur are affiliated primarily to the Central Board of Secondary Education (CBSE), the Indian School Certificate Examinations (ICSE), and the state board. While institutions of higher education falls under the jurisdiction of various governmental bodies and are affiliated to the state university. Medium of instruction is followed mainly in English, Hindi, Urdu, Santali, Odiya and Bengali. The city has numerous institutions of higher education, which has made it an emerging hub of higher education.

Established in 1949, XLRI is one of the oldest business schools in the world and has over 30,000 alumni. The current 50 acres (200,000 m^{2}) student-run green campus is located on Marine Drive. The National Institute of Technology Jamshedpur (NIT), one of the institutes of national importance, was established in 1960 as a regional engineering college (REC) and granted deemed university status in 2002. The National Metallurgical Laboratory (NML) is one of the 38 CSIR laboratories. Mahatma Gandhi Memorial Medical College, one of the six government medical colleges in the state, has two campuses in the city. Shavak Nanavati Technical Institute (SNTI), established in 1921 as the technical training department of Tata Steel, now develops skilled employees for other companies as well. Its 400,000 volume library is one of the most popular in the city. RVS College of Engineering and Technology is a premier engineering colleges in the state. Al Kabir Polytechnic, established in 1990 as one of the oldest polytechnics in the region, has introduced undergraduate programs in engineering and management. Nettur Technical Training Foundation (NTTF) in partnership with Tata Steel operates two institutes in the city—at Burmamines and Golmuri.

Karim City College, one of the oldest degree colleges in the state, which is located in Sakchi, has now started as a new campus in Maango. Arka Jain University ranked among India's top 50 private universities, 3rd among private and deemed multidisciplinary universities in Eastern India, and 9th place among emerging multidisciplinary universities across the country. Lal Bahadur Shastri Memorial College was established in 1971, to make higher education accessible to the indigenous tribals of Jharkhand. Other institutes in Jamshedpur include The Graduate School College for Women, Cooperative College, Jamshedpur Worker's College and Jamshedpur Women's University.

Some of the top schools in the city include Loyola School, Sacred Heart Convent School, D.B.M.S. English School, Carmel Junior College, Vidya Bharti Chinmaya Vidyalaya and Narbheram Hansraj English School. In 2012, seven English-medium schools in Jamshedpur earned global recoginition from the British Council-India and were selected for British Council International Award (BCTA), while new additions include RVS Academy and Little Flower School. Company townships in the city have community schools, such as Telco Urdu High School in Telco Colony. Various trusts such as Karimia Trust, Kerala Samajam and Kabir Welfare Trust maintain vast network of schools throughout the city. Jamshedpur is also known for religious education. Ramakrishna Mission School in Jamshedpur is a part of Ramakrishna Mission. Arshadul Qadri (1925–2002), a well-known Islamic scholar, was from Jamshedpur.

== Sports ==
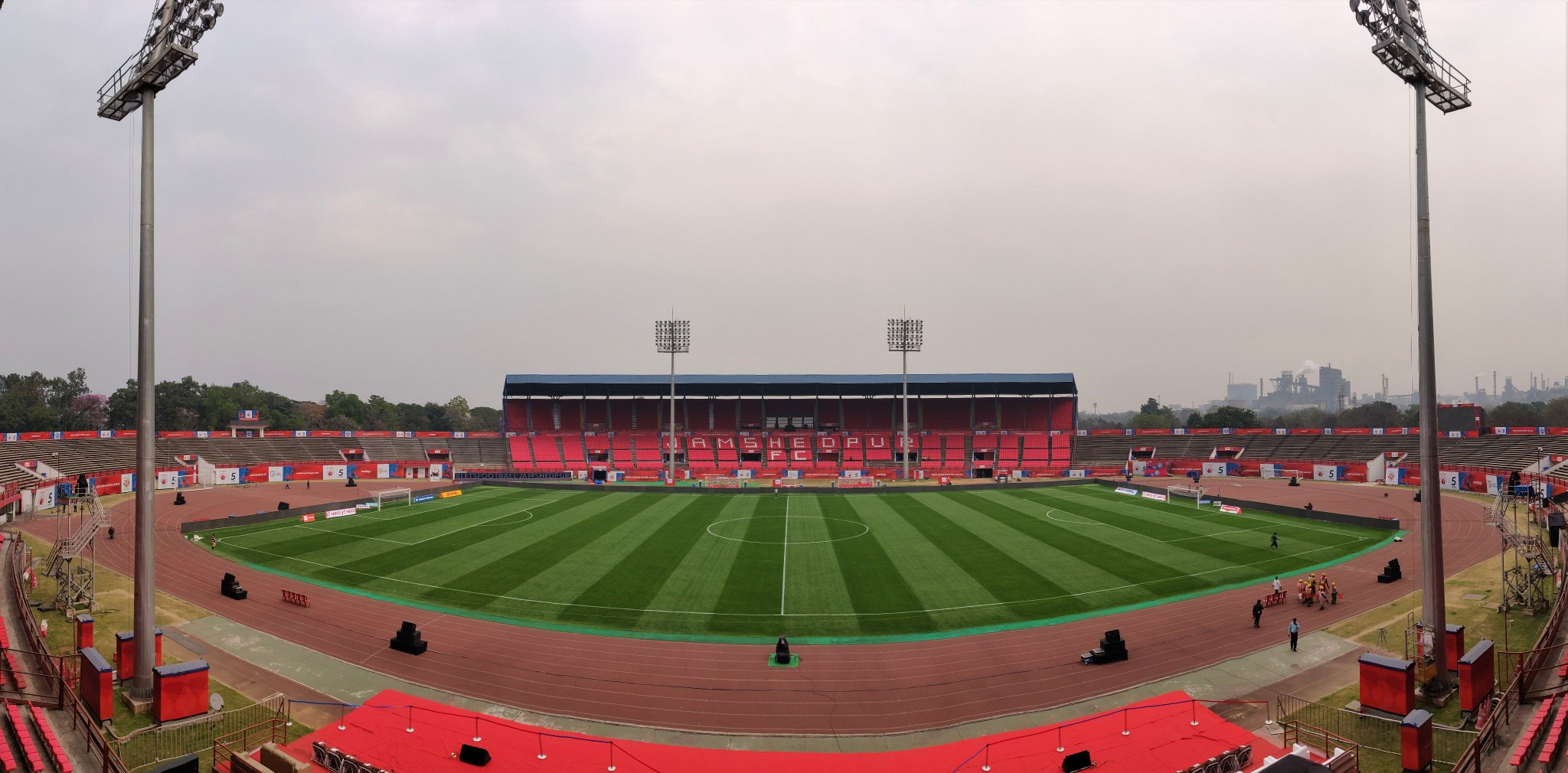
J.R.D. Tata Stadium at Northern Town, Jamshedpur

Jamshedpur's private clubs provide opportunities for activities, such as golf, tennis, squash, billiards, horseriding and water scootering. Jamshedpur FC is a professional football club based in Jamshedpur which competes in the Indian Super League (ISL), the top flight of Indian Football. The club is owned by Tata Steel.

=== Facilities and academies ===
Sporting facilities and academies include:

- JRD Tata Sports Complex has an international standard multi-use stadium and an eight-lane mono-synthetic track. It is primarily used for football and athletics but facilities for various other sports including archery, basketball, field hockey, swimming, table tennis, tennis, volleyball, skating, yoga as well as a modern gymnasium, are available at the complex. The stadium is used by Jamshedpur FC as their home ground. it hosted the women football competition & archery event of the 34th National Games in 2011.
- Keenan Stadium hosted its 1st International One Day Cricket match on 7 December 1983 in which India lost to the touring West Indies Team. Many other International matches have been played here in which India has won only one match against South Africa in 1999–2000.
- Tata Football Academy was started in 1987 to nurture budding Indian footballers and raise the standard of Indian football. TFA is a football club in Jamshedpur, sponsored by Tata Steel. Today, Tata Football Academy is one of the premier football breeding grounds in India.
- Tata Archery Academy: archery is a sport indigenous to the tribal people of Chhotanagpur and Santhal Pargana. Tata Steel has pursued and nurtured the local tribals and provided them with facilities and training to bring them up to international competition standards in archery. Its students have attributed a lot of fame to the institute by bringing in many medals in National and International competitions.
- Tata Steel Adventure Foundation – Bachendri Pal, the first Indian woman to climb Mount Everest, is the director of Tata Steel Adventure Foundation.

Golmuri Golf Course

Jamshedpur has two golf courses—the Beldih Golf Course and the Golmuri Golf Course. Both of these courses are at the heart of the city. The biggest is the Beldih Golf Course which is around 6,000 yards. The Golmuri Golf Course although smaller is also challenging. They together hold the annual Tata Open Golf Tournament which is an event held under the support of the Professional Golf Tour of India. The tournament was started in 2002. Jamshedpur also has the Jamshedpur Gliding Club and the Jamshedpur Co-operative Flying club.

== Health facilities ==
Some of the notable hospitals and health facilities in Jamshedpur include:

- MGM Medical College & Hospital
- Sadar Hospital – government hospital providing general and emergency care
- Tata Main Hospital (TMH)
- MTMH / MTMC Cancer Centre – dedicated oncology centre
- Medica Superspecialty Hospital – multi-specialty care
- Fortis Hospital, Kadma – multi-specialty hospital
- Bramhananda Hospital – multi-specialty hospital

== Media ==
=== Television ===
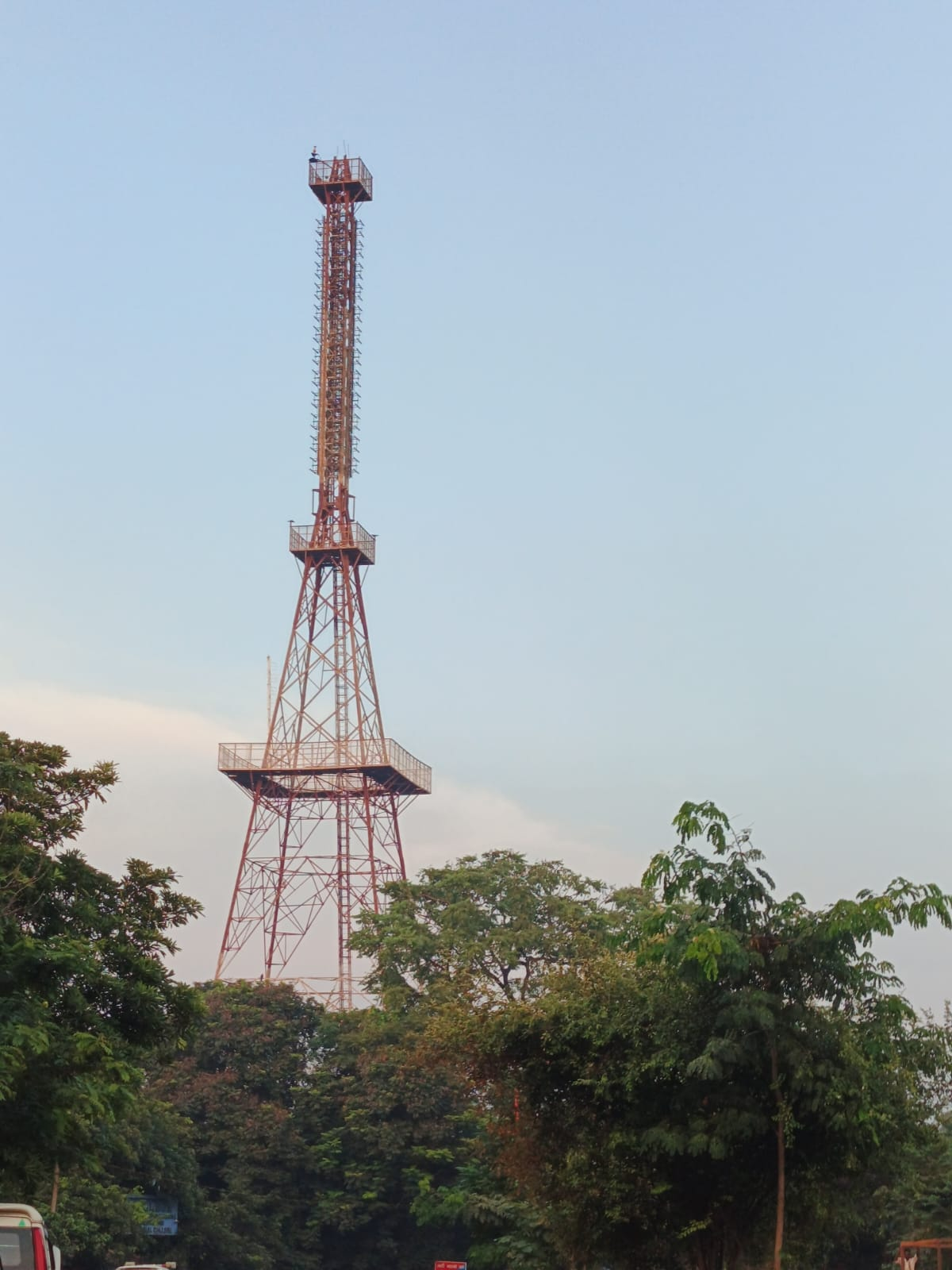
The main television tower for Doordarshan in Golmuri

Jamshedpur has various local news broadcast and cable media channels including:

- Aaj Tak
- ABP News
- 5AM

=== Print ===
English, Santali, and Bengali newspapers are published from the city, including.

Hindi newspapers

- Dainik Jagran
- Dainik Bhaskar
- Hindustan Dainik
- Prabhat Khabar

English newspapers

- The Avenue Mail.
- The Town Post.

Bengali Newspapers

- Khobor Kagoj

== Transportation ==
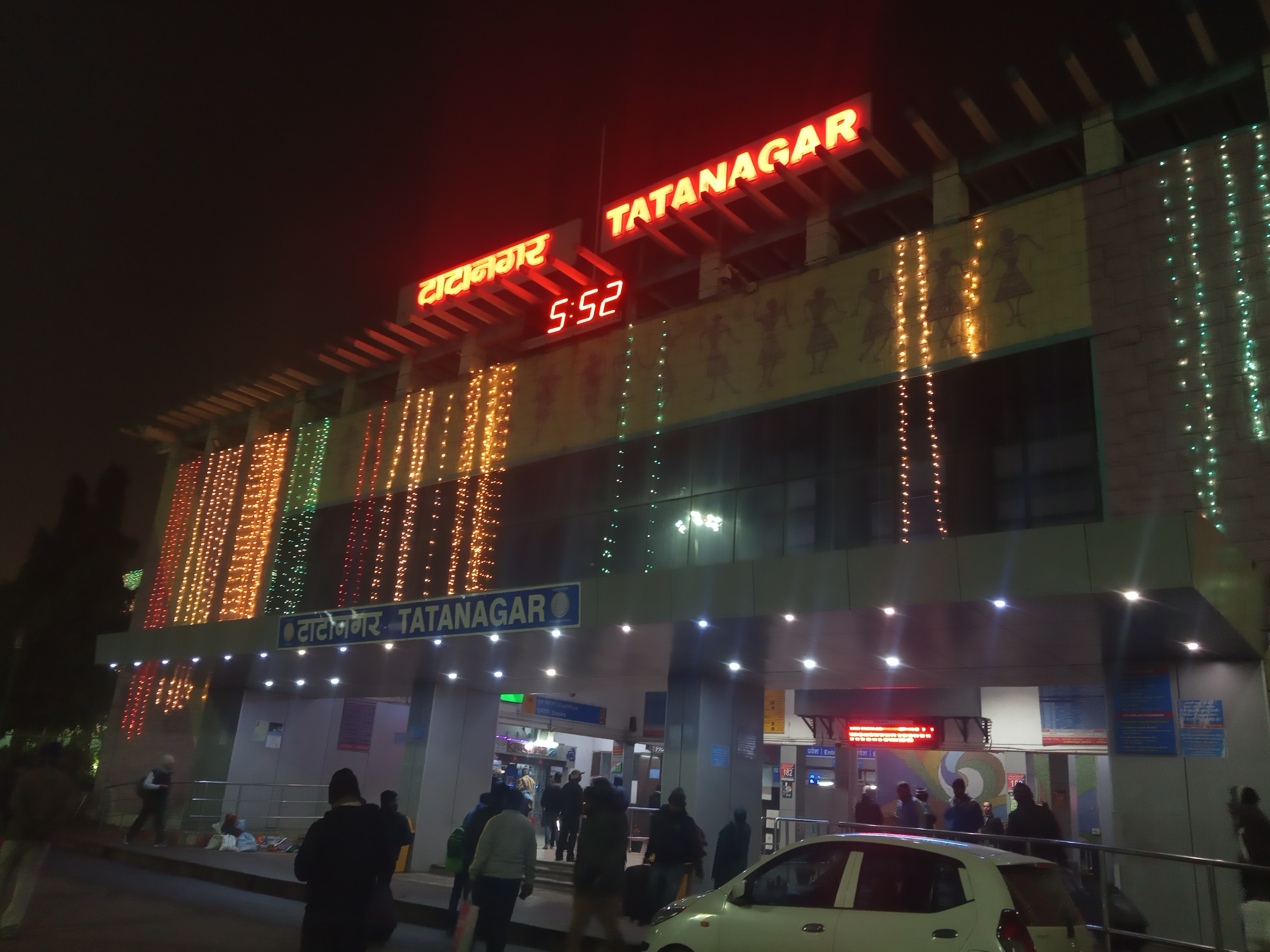
Tatanagar Junction railway station

The Tatanagar Junction and Adityapur Station on the Chakradharpur railway division of the South Eastern Railway, is the two major railhead of Jamshedpur. Other railway stations in the city include Chandil, Gamharia, Kandra, Rakha Mines, Galudih, Ghatshila, Dhalbhumgarh and Govindpur.

Jamshedpur is connected to other parts of India through national and state highways. The major highways are:

- National Highway 18 (NH-18) touches the city and connects it to Mumbai and further joins the NH-49, which connects with Kolkata, Delhi AH-1, NH-18 and NH-49 connects it to Kharagpur, Kolkata.
- National Highway 18 (NH-18) connects Jamshedpur to Dhanbad, Via Bokaro.
- National Highway 18 connects to National Highway 43 Ranchi via Chowka
- Marine Drive, Jamshedpur connects Adityapur Toll Bridge to Mango via Kadma, Sonari through the western corridors of Jamshedpur.
- For local transport, commuters have the options of bus and auto rikshaw. It is a popular mode of transport among commuters.

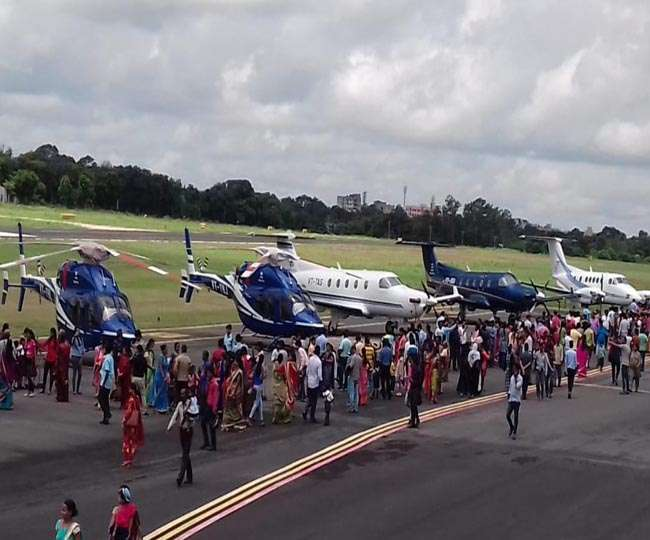
Sonari Airport

Jamshedpur has a bus station in Mango. This bus station have buses which go to other cities like Bokaro, Dhanbad, Ranchi etc. However, now there is a plan to update and rebuild and renovate this bus stand/station.

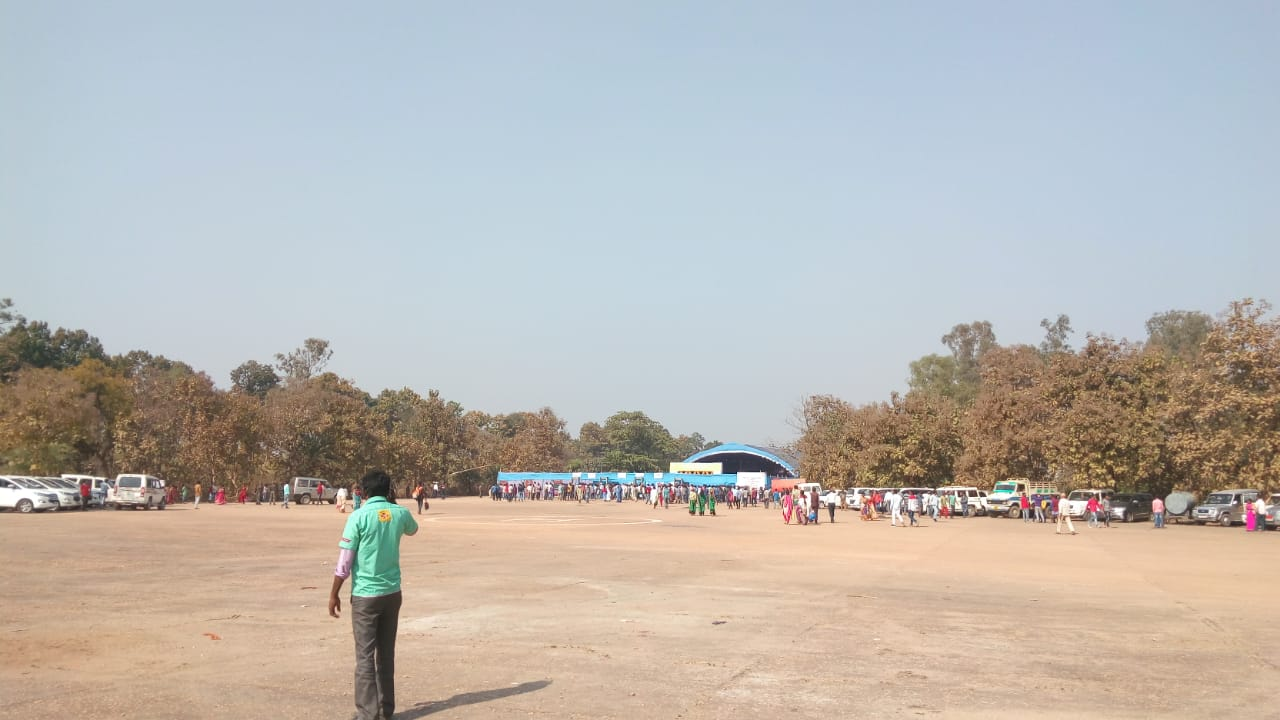
Dhalbhumgarh Airport

Sonari Airport is serving the city at present. It is spread over a 25-acre area in the Sonari area of the city. The airport is primarily used for bringing in chartered planes of the TATA group. In 2022, it was announced that the Sonari Airport will start commercial public flights for Jamshedpur to Bhubaneswar, Ranchi and Kolkata. After efforts from the Ministry of Civil Aviation, Government of Jharkhand and Tata Steel, the airport has been reopened on 31 January 2023, with flight services provided by the new low-cost regional airline, IndiaOne Air, to Kolkata and Bhubaneswar.

Dhalbhumgarh Airport is a proposed public airport located at Dhalbhumgarh, in the state of Jharkhand, India as a greenfield airport for Jamshedpur. It will be built on the site of an abandoned World War II airfield situated 60 km (37 mi) from Jamshedpur on NH-33. The old airfield was built around 1948, as an ancillary runway for other airfields in the vicinity that were being built around India's eastern frontier as part of the war effort.

It was one of the airfields used by Allied forces to repel the advancing Japanese troops and to maintain transport links with China. As the Japanese forces came to control shipping in the China Sea, seaborne supply routes to China were cut and the difficult 500 km (310 mi) route over the Himalayas was increasingly used. The airfield was abandoned after the war. The technical team of the Airports Authority of India (AAI) conducted a survey in 2017 and approved the Dhalbhumgarh site for a greenfield airport. The government plans to invest Rs 300 crore through AAI for the new airport which will have a three-kilometre (1.9 mi) runway. In January 2018, Union Minister of State for Civil Aviation Jayant Sinha announced that the Union Civil Aviation Ministry and the Jharkhand Government would sign a Memorandum of Understanding (MoU) for the construction of Dhalbhumgarh Airport.

== Tourism ==
Jamshedpur has a number of popular tourist destinations, including:

- Jubilee Park, built by Jamsetji Tata and was inspired by Vrindavan Gardens of Mysore
- Dalma Wild Life Sanctuary
- Dimna Lake, artificial reservoir
- Chandil Dam
- Tata Steel Zoological Park
- JRD Tata Sports Complex, home stadium of Jamshedpur FC and held 2011 National Games
- Marine Drive, Jamshedpur, one of the few marine drives in India
- Dalma Hills, hill range surrounding East Singhbhum
- Ghatshila, a picnic spot
- Jamshedpur Coin Museum, museum has got 1200 rare and antique coins of varied mint & metals and also has the world's smallest coin dating back to 300–400 AD
- Sumant Moolgaonkar Park, build near HUDCO Lake
- Millenium Park
- The Russi Modi Centre of Excellence
- Birsa Fun City Waterpark, situated in Galudih
- P&M Hi-Tech City Centre Mall

== International relations ==
=== Diplomatic visits ===
- (United Kingdom) Edwina Mountbatten, Viceregal-Consort of India (1958)
- Ludwig Erhard, Deputy Prime Minister of West Germany (1958)
- (Kingdom of Afghanistan) Mohammad Daoud Khan, prime minister of Afghanistan (1959)
- (United Kingdom) Prince Philip, Duke of Edinburgh (1959)
- Vince Cable, Business Secretary of the United Kingdom (1965)
- (Pahlavi Iran) Mohammad Reza Pahlavi, the Shah of Iran and Farah Pahlavi, the Queen of Iran (1969)
- Prince Charles, Prince of the United Kingdom (2000)
- Kosit Panpiemras, Deputy Prime Minister of Thailand (2007)
- Than Shwe, Prime Minister of Myanmar (2010)
- Peter Beckingham, Governor of Turks and Caicos Islands (2013)
- Craig Hall, United States Consul General to Kolkata (2016)
- (France) Damien Syed, French Consul General (2016)
- (United States) Melinda Pavek, US Consul General (2023)
- Nakagawa Koichi, Consul General of Japan in Kolkata (2023)
- (United States) Kathy Giles-Diaz, U.S Consul General (2025)

=== Twin towns and sister cities ===
- Gunsan, South Korea (2004)
- Toyota, Japan (proposed)

== Notable people ==
- Varun Aaron, cricketer
- Imtiaz Ali, director
- Pratyusha Banerjee, television actress
- Priyanka Chopra, Indian singer, actress and winner of Miss World 2000
- Rasika Dugal, actress
- Gerald Durrell, OBE, conservationist
- Ishita Dutta, actress
- Tanushree Dutta, former Femina Miss India and actress
- Adarsh Gourav, actor
- Ishank Jaggi, cricketer
- Saba Karim, cricketer
- Kamlesh Kumar, teacher and social activist
- R. Madhavan, actor
- Manmohan, actor
- Shomu Mukherjee, filmmaker
- Gourav Mukhi, footballer
- Shweta Basu Prasad, actress
- Arshadul Qadri, scholar
- K. V. P. Rao, cricketer
- Shilpa Rao, singer
- Randhir Singh, cricketer
- Simone Singh, Indian television actress
- Saurabh Tiwary, cricketer
