= Chinmaya Vidyalaya, Jamshedpur =

Private primary and secondary school in Jamshedpur, Jharkhand, India

Vidya Bharati Chinmaya Vidyalaya

Location
- Jamshedpur, Jharkhand, 831004; India; 22°46′33.9″N 86°15′42.6″E

Information
- Type: Private primary and secondary school
- Motto: English: Keep Smiling
- Established: 1 February 1979; 47 years ago
- School district: East Singhbhum
- School code: 20180310804 (UDISE)
- Principal: Ms Mina Wilkhu
- Faculty: ~150
- Grades: K-12
- Gender: Co-educational
- Enrollment: ~5000
- Language: English
- Houses: Surya; Varuna; Soma; Indra; Sameera; Vyoma
- Colours: Light Cyan and Grey
- Nickname: Chinmayans
- Affiliation: CBSE; AISSCE; AISSE
- Website: vbcvjsr.in

Vidya Bharati Chinmaya Vidyalaya, is an English-medium school in Jamshedpur, India that was established on February 1, 1979. The school is affiliated with the Central Board of Secondary Education (CBSE). It is managed by the Chinmaya Mission and is part of the Chinmaya Vidyalayas network. The school was established under the patronage of TATA Motors (then known as TATA Engineering and Locomotive Company, or Telco), which provided essential support such as power and water supply. The current principal is Mina Wilkhu, and the chairman is Manas Mishra.

The Vidyalaya has won in various inter-school fests in the city, including the Azionare 2024 hosted by Loyola School, Jamshedpur and Quantum 2022 hosted by Little Flower School, Jamshedpur.
