= Dimna Lake =

Lake in Jharkhand

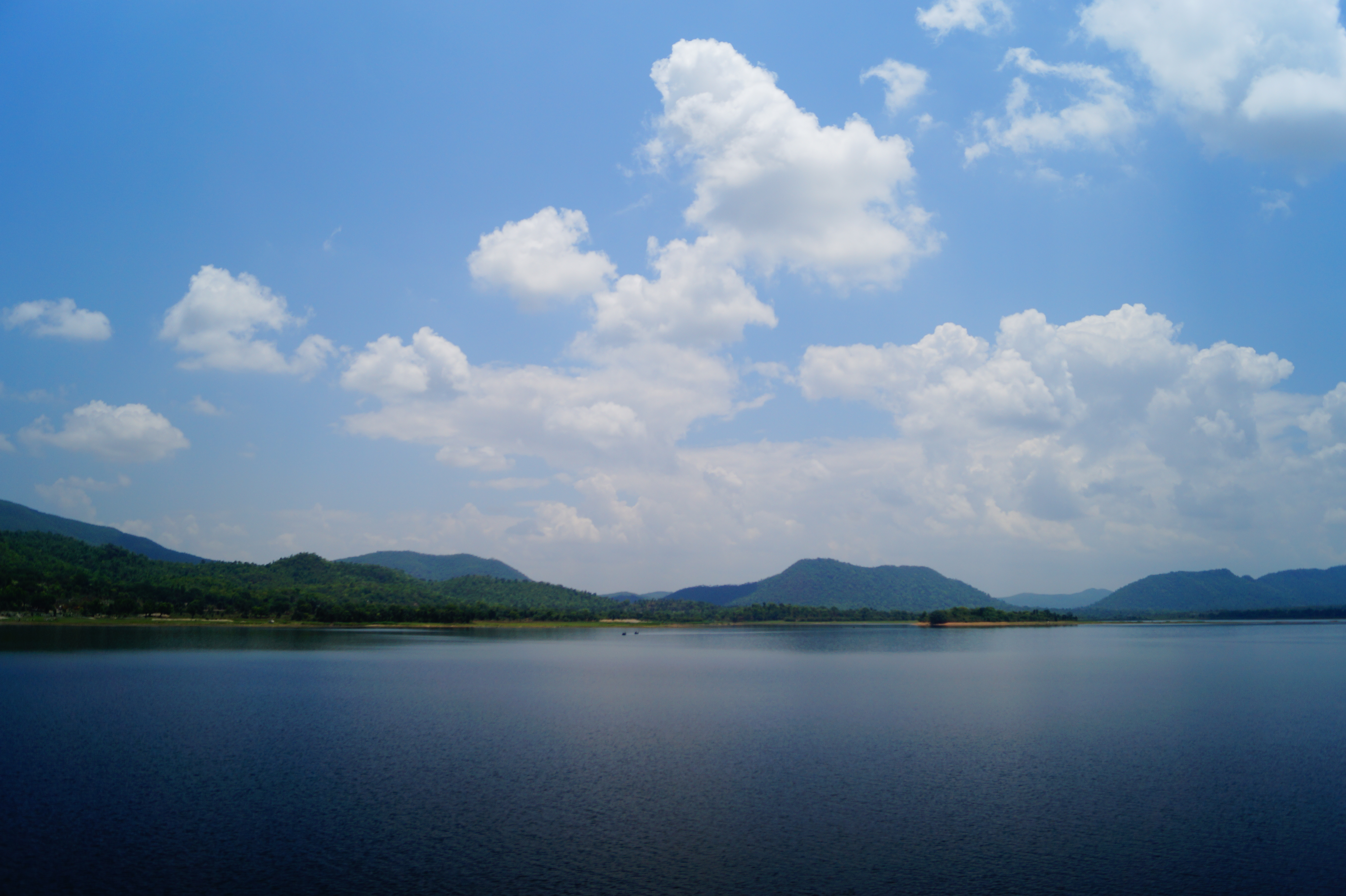
- Dimna Lake in Boram block - Dalma Hills in the background

- Location within Jharkhand Location within India
- Location: Jamshedpur, Jharkhand
- Coordinates: 22°51′47.178″N 86°15′41.623″E
- Type: Reservoir
- Basin countries: India
- Built: 1944
- Surface area: 5.5 km^{2} (1,400 acres)

Dimna Lake is an artificial reservoir located near Dalma Wildlife Sanctuary, 15 km from the city of Jamshedpur, in the state of Jharkhand, India. Constructed in 1944, by Tata Steel to deal with the water scarcity in the city.

== Geography ==
Dimna Lake is situated at the foot of . Dimna Lake covers about 5.5 km^{2}, around 1,861 acres were acquired under the Land Acquisition Act of 1894 for the dam. The Lake is the only source of drinking water for Jamshedpur town. The lake is near to the Dalma Wildlife Sanctuary.

It is about 100 km from the capital city Ranchi, and 15 km from the steel city Jamshedpur. The total storage capacity of Dimna Lake is about 120 lakh cubic feet. The spread of water in the lake is approximately two square miles. The lake is 3 and a half miles long and about a mile wide. There are two short dams of the composite type, one 800 ft. long and the second 1,200 ft. long. The maximum height of the dam from the lowest level is 83 feet and the maximum width at the bottom is about 400 ft. An outlet with suitable valves is provided and there are pipelines through which water is carried to Jamshedpur. The source of water generation is rainfall. The harvested rainwater majorly supports local community, biodiversity and municipal water demand of Jamshedpur town during monsoon season. Rainwater from an area of about 36 square miles from the hilly terrain flowed into the Dimna Nala. Nature had provided a readymade basin and a range of hills in such a manner that by closing two small gaps, a large quantity of water could be stored.

== History ==
In the late 1930s, Jamshedpur felt that water scarcity could hit the people of the city as the population was growing rapidly. To deal with the crisis, Dimna Nala Water Supply Scheme was introduced.

Dimna Lake was constructed and owned by Tata Steel in the Boram block. The construction began in February 1940. The project was successfully completed, and water was supplied to the city for the first time on April 17, 1944.

== Activities ==
Dimna Lake is famous for its serenity and greenery. The lake is well-known as a picnic spot due to its clear water and scenic surroundings. Popular activities in the near by area also include hiking and water activities such as boating, rowing, and jet skiing.

== Accessibility ==
Nearest town	Chandil
Nearest city	Jamshedpur, Gamharia, Adityapur (15 km)
Nearest railhead	Chandil Railway Station
Nearest airport	Ranchi, Jharkhand
Nearest highway	Tata - Ranchi National Highway-33

== See also ==
- Dalma Wildlife Sanctuary
- Tata Steel Zoological Park
- Jubilee Park, Jamshedpur
- Rankini Temple, Jadugora
