= Veronica of the Passion =

19th-century English religious sister and foundress

Venerable Veronica of the Passion OCD
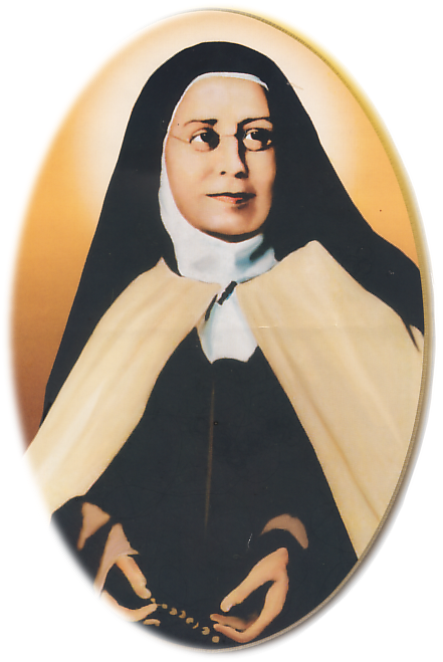
- Born: Sophie Leeves; 1 October 1823; Istanbul
- Died: 16 November 1906 (aged 83); Pau, Pyrénées-Atlantiques, France

Veronica of the Passion, OCD (born Sophie Leeves; 1 October 1823 – 11 November 1906) was an Ottoman-born English Catholic nun who founded the Sisters of the Apostolic Carmel, a religious congregation for women based in India.

== Biography ==
She was born as Sophie Leeves in 1823 in Istanbul, to Henry Daniel Leeves, an Anglican chaplain to the British Embassy there, and to Sophia Mary Haultain, the daughter of a Colonel in the British army.

When Leeves was in her teens a change came over her. She spent long hours in prayers. "Easter Tuesday ended in a dark night" she wrote. "I blew out the last candles. The house was still. Suddenly a clear but soft voice broke the stillness and I heard these words distinctly 'My peace I leave you; My peace I give you'. Then all was still again, the night as well as my heart".

Leeves felt drawn to the Roman Catholic Church, especially the sacraments of Confession and Holy Communion. Leeves and others were annoyed at this. She broke off her engagement to a naval officer.

Leeves was received into the Catholic Church on 2 February 1850 in Malta. The following year, she went to France where she entered the Sisters of St. Joseph of the Apparition, which had been founded in 1836 by Emily de Vialar. After completing the novitiate, she was professed as a member of the congregation on 14 September 1851 and received the relgious name Veronica of the Passion.

In 1863 Veronica was assigned to teach at the congregation's foundation in India, sent at the request of the bishop Marie Antony, who had appealed to France for assistance to hand over the education of youth to religious. As a preliminary step he had bought a house at Calicut (now Kozhikode) in 1860 and fitted it up for a convent and at the request of the people opened a school there on 1 April 1862, calling it St. Joseph's School. Veronica and Mary Joseph, after a long and tiring voyage and a brief halt at Mangalore, arrived there on 27 April 1862, and took charge of the school. She served as the first Superior of the convent and spent two years teaching at both Mangalore and Kozhikode.

It was there that Veronica met the priest Marie Ephrem of the Sacred Heart Garrelon. He, along with the other Discalced Carmeltite friars who provided pastoral care for western India, had long envisioned a group of teaching Sisters to provide an education to the women and girls of the region. The friar felt that Veronica was an excellent candidate to lead this effort, which coincided with her own inner call to join the Carmelite Order.

After much reflection and anguish, Veronica accepted the call to start such a foundation. She left the Sisters of St. Joseph and returned to France, where she entered the Carmel of Pau. After her solemn vows, Veronica embarked on the formation of a small group of European women who had joined to start the foundation in India, living in a house in Bayonne. They officially formed the Congregation of the Sisters of the Carmelite Third Order Regular, known as the "Apostolic Carmel", on 16 July 1868, the feast of Our Lady of Mount Carmel.

A small group of three sisters left for India, under the leadership of Mary of the Angels, who served as the first Superior General and Mistress of novices of the new congregation. They arrived in India on 19 November 1870, about the same time as Ephrem was appointed as the local bishop. Shortly after their arrival, the sisters opened the St. Ann School for Girls.

In 1873, Veronica returned to the Carmel of Pau, where she died on 16 November 1906, at the age of 83.

== Legacy ==
On 5 September 1892, the congregation Veronica helped to found became formally affiliated with the Discalced Carmelite Order. It has grown and now has branches in various parts of India, Sri Lanka, Kuwait, Pakistan, Kenya, Rome and Bahrain. The Congregation is governed under six Provinces and centrally administered by the General Team from the General Motherhouse, Bangalore, with Agatha Mary as the present Superior General since 2008.

=== Beatification process ===
Efforts for the opening of Veronica of the Passion's beatification process were made by the Sisters of the Apostolic Carmel in 1997. Veronica has been declared Venerable in July 2014.

== Writings ==
Veronica left an Autobiography, a large number of letters and some Regulations for the nuns of the third order of St Teresa.

- Carmel in India, London, Burns and Oates, 1895 (new edition at Mangalore, 1964).
- Vie merveilleuse de Sœur Marie de Jésus crucifié, Montpellier, 1903.

== Bibliography ==
- Marie des Anges: A short history of the apostolic Carmel, 1890
- Mary Candida AC: The apostolic Carmel; seed time, Bangalore, 1974
- Mary Carol AC: A strange destiny: the life of Mother Mary Veronica of the Passion, foundress of the Apostolic Carmel, Bangalore, 1988
