= National Highway 118 (India) =

National highway in India

National Highway 118
- Map of National Highway 118 in red
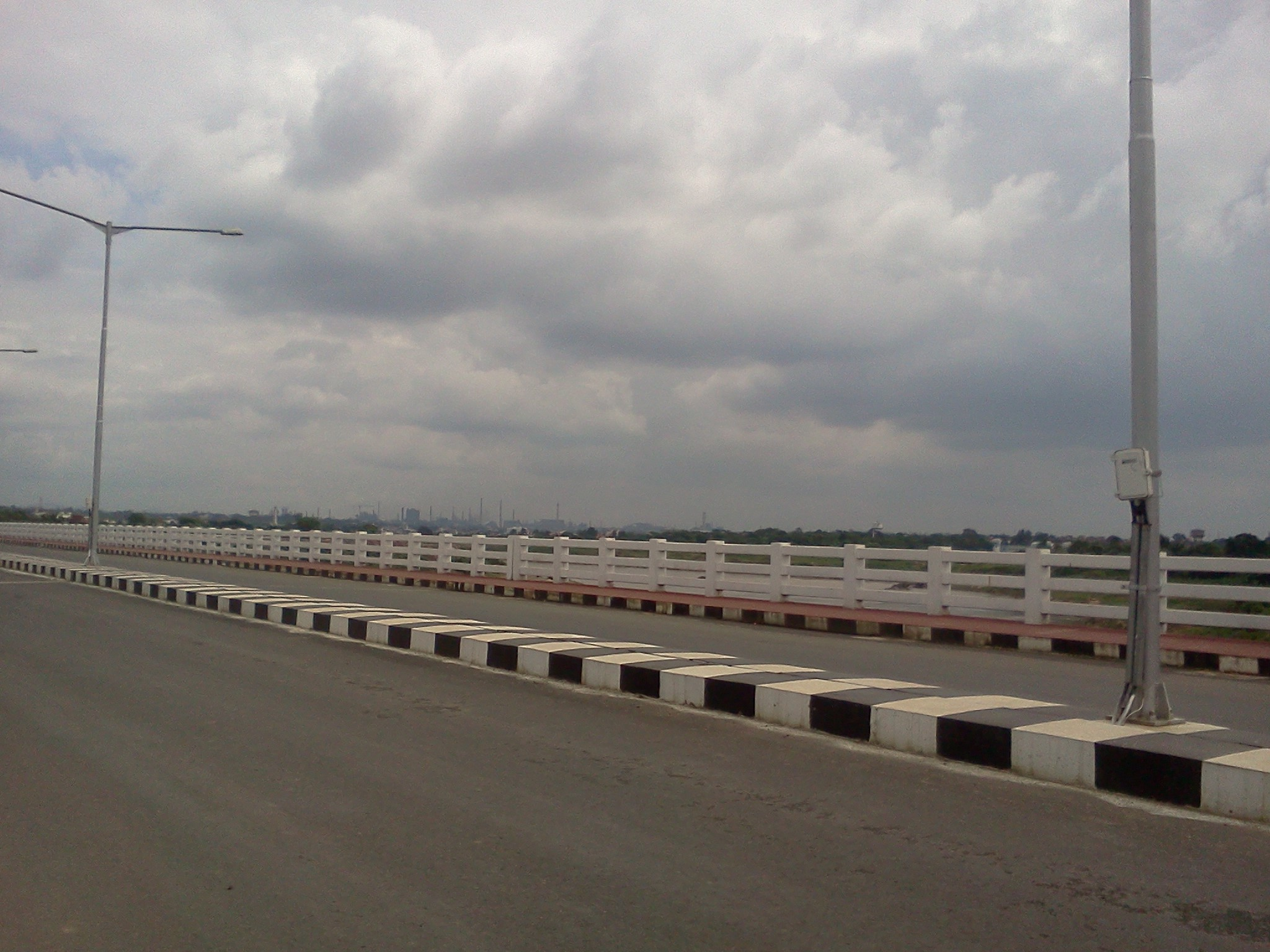
- Tata Steel view from Adityapur toll bridge

Route information
- Auxiliary route of NH 18
- Length: 56.40 km (35.05 mi)

Major junctions
- North end: Asanboni near Jamshedpur
- South end: Chawlibasa

Location
- Country: India
- States: Jharkhand

Highway system
- Roads in India; Expressways; National; State; Asian
← NH 18	→ NH 118

National Highway 118 is a national highway of India. It used to connect Asanboni and Jamshedpur in the state of Jharkhand. At 17 km (11 mi) length, it was one of the shortest national highways in India. Before renumbering of national highways, route of NH-118 was part of old national highway 32. It is a spur road of National Highway 18. But post 2021, the route is extended to Chawlibasa on NH43 connecting Jamshedpur with Adityapur, Kandra, Chowka & Dulmi Ghat. Jamshedpur/Tatanagar vehicles now use this Adityapur, Kandra, Chowka, Dulmi Ghat, Chawlibasa route to travel Ranchi due to development works undergoing at Chandil Gol chakkar area.

== Route ==
NH118 links Asanboni at NH 18 with Jamshedpur, Adityapur, Kandra, Chowka, Dulmi Ghat, Chawlibasa in the state of Jharkhand.

== See also ==
- List of national highways in India
- List of national highways in India by state
- National Highways Development Project
