= Sisters of the Apostolic Carmel =

Female Catholic religious congregation

The Sisters of the Apostolic Carmel is a Carmelite religious institute dedicated to female education. It was founded in the latter part of the 19th century by Mother Veronica of the Passion, under the guidance of her mentor, Bishop Marie Ephrem of the Sacred Heart, who had envisioned the birth of "a Carmel for the missions" in India, devoted to teaching and education.

Sister Veronica of the Passion had come to India as a member of the teaching congregation of the Sisters of St. Joseph of the Apparition, founded in France in 1832 by Saint Emily de Vialar († 1856). She had entered the congregation in 1851, shortly after her conversion to the Roman Catholic Church from the Church of England. She met Bishop Ephrem upon her assignment to India in the early 1850s. Like the Discalced Carmelite friars providing pastoral care to western India, they had sought to provide Catholic education to the women and young girls under their care.

Inspired by his vision of such a religious institute of Carmelite Sisters, Sister Veronica entered the Carmel of Puy, France, as a novice in the Discalced Carmelite Order. After her religious vows, she began to train a group of young European women of varying nationalities for the task of education in India.

On November 19, 1870, the first group of Sisters arrived in Mangalore, under the leadership of Mother Mary of the Angels, who was the first Superior General and novice mistress, to start the Mission. St. Anne Convent, which became the motherhouse, was the cradle of the Apostolic Carmel.

The Apostolic Carmel has spread its branches into the various parts of India, Sri Lanka, Kuwait, Pakistan, Kenya, Rome and Bahrain. The Congregation is governed under Six Provinces and centrally administered by the General Team from the General Motherhouse in Bangalore, with Sister Agatha Mary as the present Superior General (2008).

The mission of the religious institute was a Catholic value-based education, with special attention given to the disadvantaged sections of society through various levels of education: pre-primary, primary, secondary, pre-university, higher, technical and special education for disabled people. The other ministries include: healing ministry, nursing care, de-addiction and rehabilitation of alcoholics and drug addicts, self-help groups, prison ministry, ministering to persons with different disabilities, community-based-rehabilitation, Catechism and faith education.

== See also ==
- Constitutions of the Carmelite Order
