= Dalma Hills =

Hills stretching over Jharkhand and West Bengal states in India

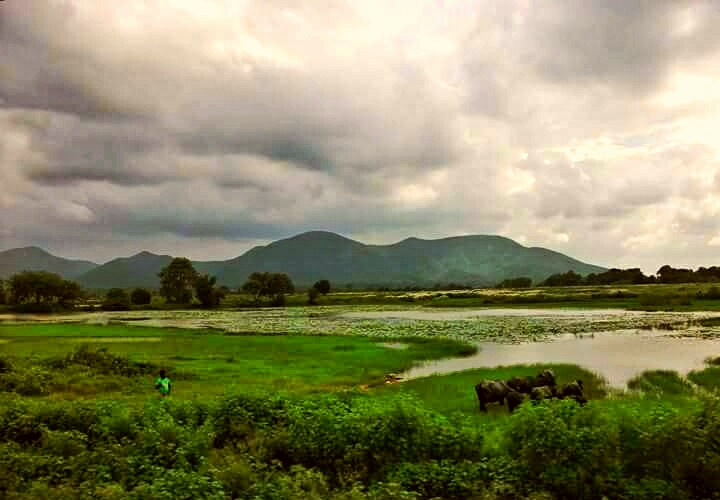
Dalma Hills

Dalma range refers to the continuation of an assemblage of hills stretching over Jharkhand and West Bengal states in India.

== Tourism ==
- Hanuman Temple
- Shiva Temple
- Pindrabera FRH
- Majhlabandh
- Nichlabandh
- Bamboo hut
- Natural Interpretation Center
- Deer Enclosure
- Elephant Rescue Center

== See also ==
- Dalma Wildlife Sanctuary
