= Tata Steel Zoological Park =

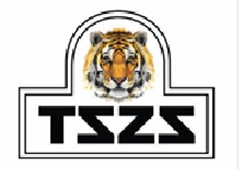
- Logo of Tata Steel Zoological Society

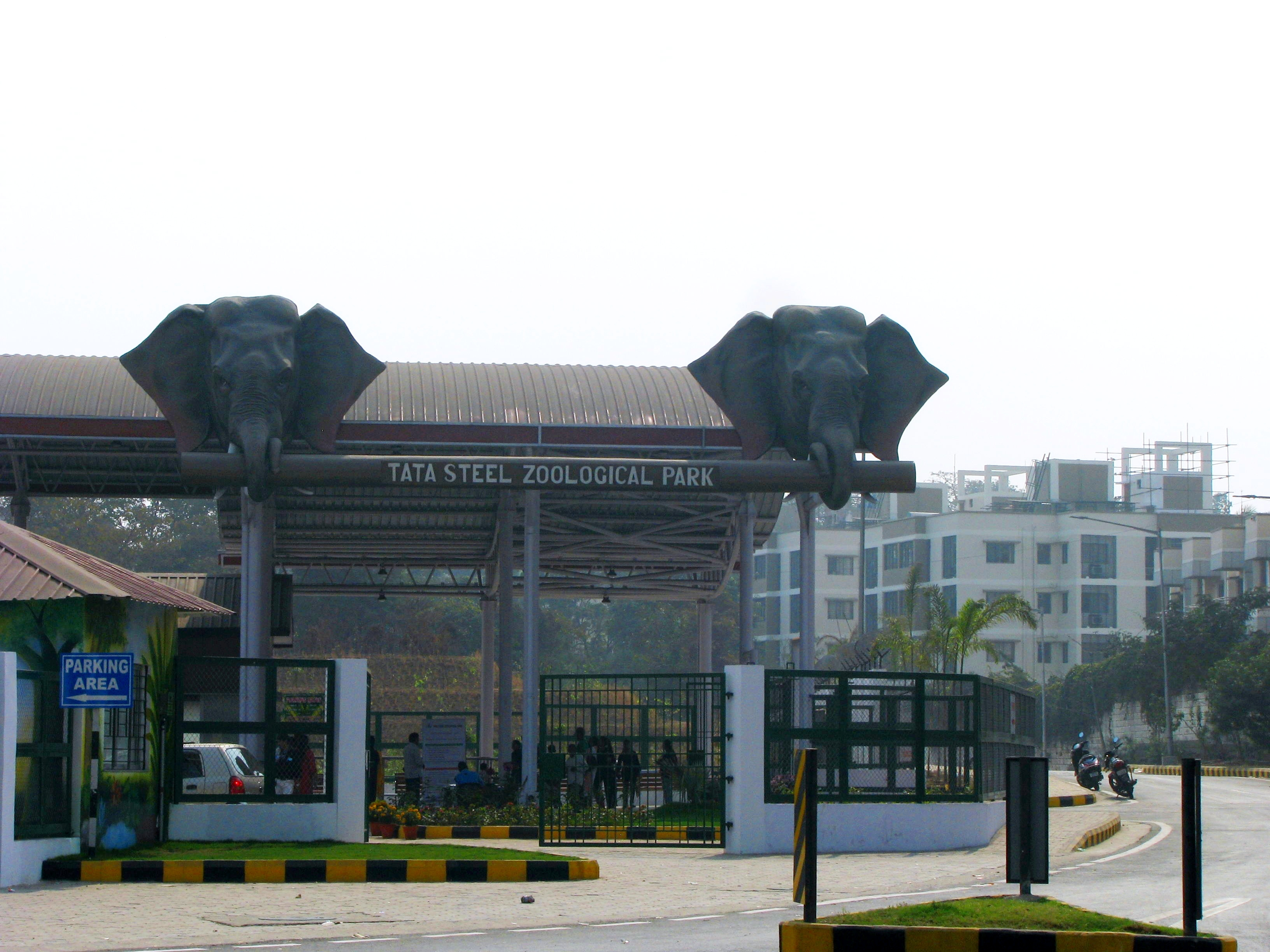
- New Entrance gate of Tata Steel Zoological Park
- Interactive map of Tata Steel Zoological Park
- 22.814610°N 86.195925°E
- Date opened: 3 March 1994
- Location: Sakchi, Jamshedpur, Jharkhand, India
- Land area: 30 ha (74 acres)
- No. of animals: 411
- No. of species: 50
- Annual visitors: 3,34,838 (2023-24)
- Memberships: Tata Steel, CZA
- Major exhibits: Butterfly House
- Owner: Tata Steel Limited
- Director: Dr. Naim Akhtar
- Management: Tata Steel Zoological Society
- Website: www.tatazoo.in

Tata Steel Zoological Park (TSZP) is situated in a corner of Jubilee Park, Jamshedpur.

TSZP is a recognized 'Medium' category Zoo by the Central Zoo Authority (CZA). The CZA evaluates Zoos on periodic basis and stipulates conditions for their improvement. TSZP has been evaluated by CZA at periodic intervals and major recommendations to meet the prescribed standards are creation of a veterinary hospital with postmortem room and incinerator, shifting of animal enclosures, separate entry and exit gates for visiting public, strengthening perimeter wall etc. CZA had approved the new layout plan of the Zoological Park in July 2020. However, the plan for its implementation got delayed due to Covid, and the work commenced in 2022. The entire project has been phased out and it is likely to be completed by the year 2025.

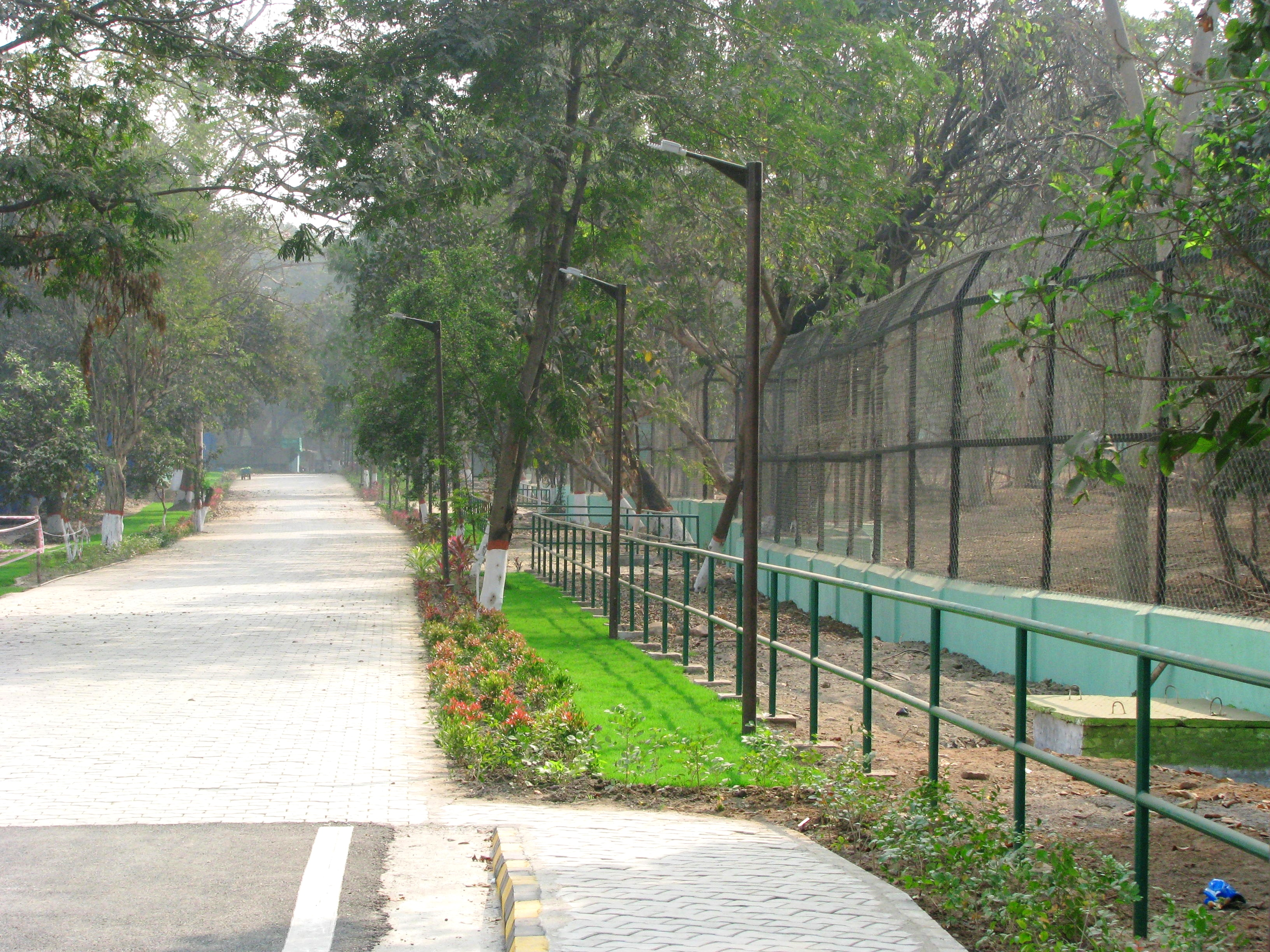
Newly remodeled enclosure for herbivores at Tata Steel Zoological Park

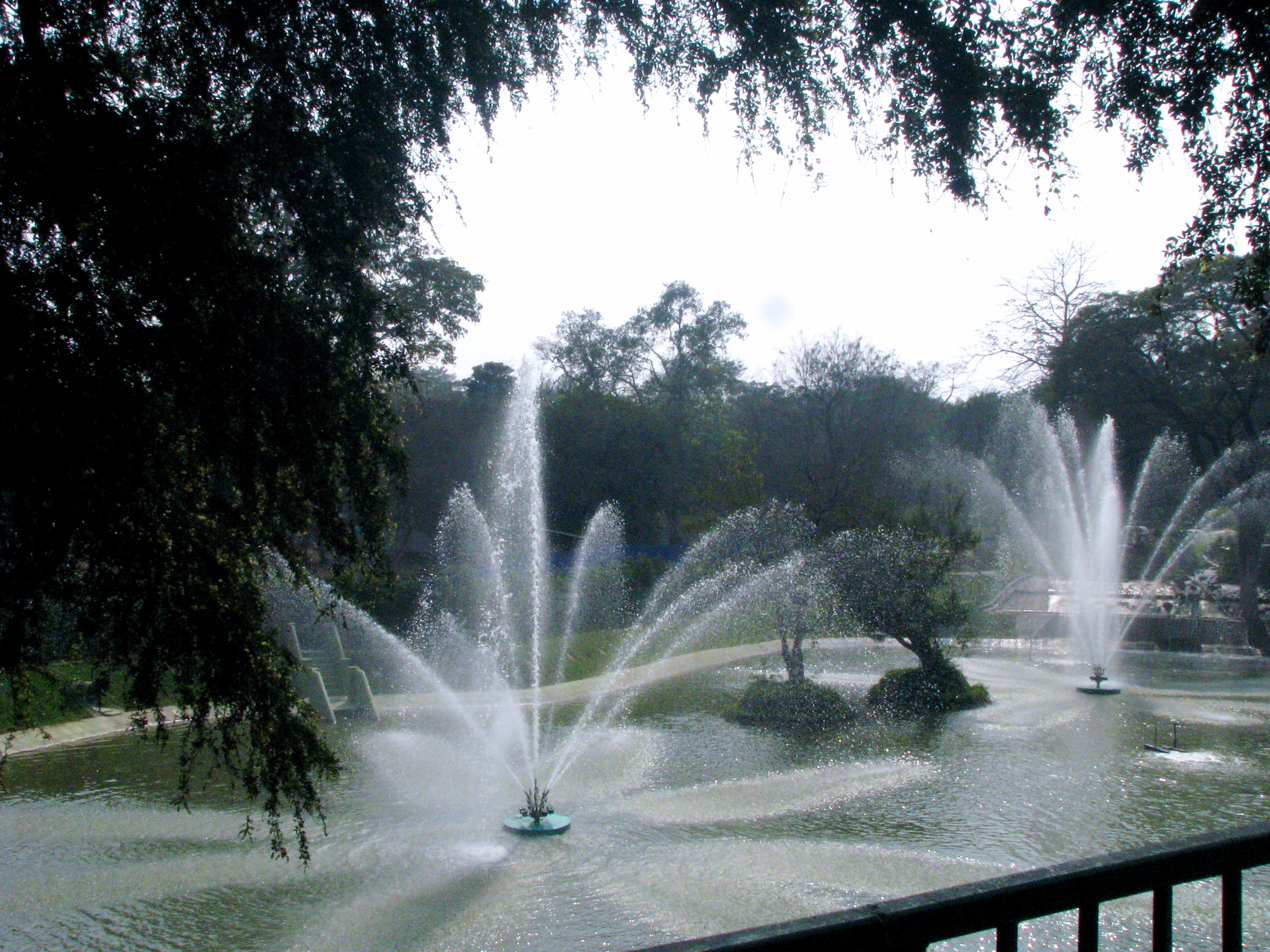
Water Fountain of Tata Steel Zoological Park

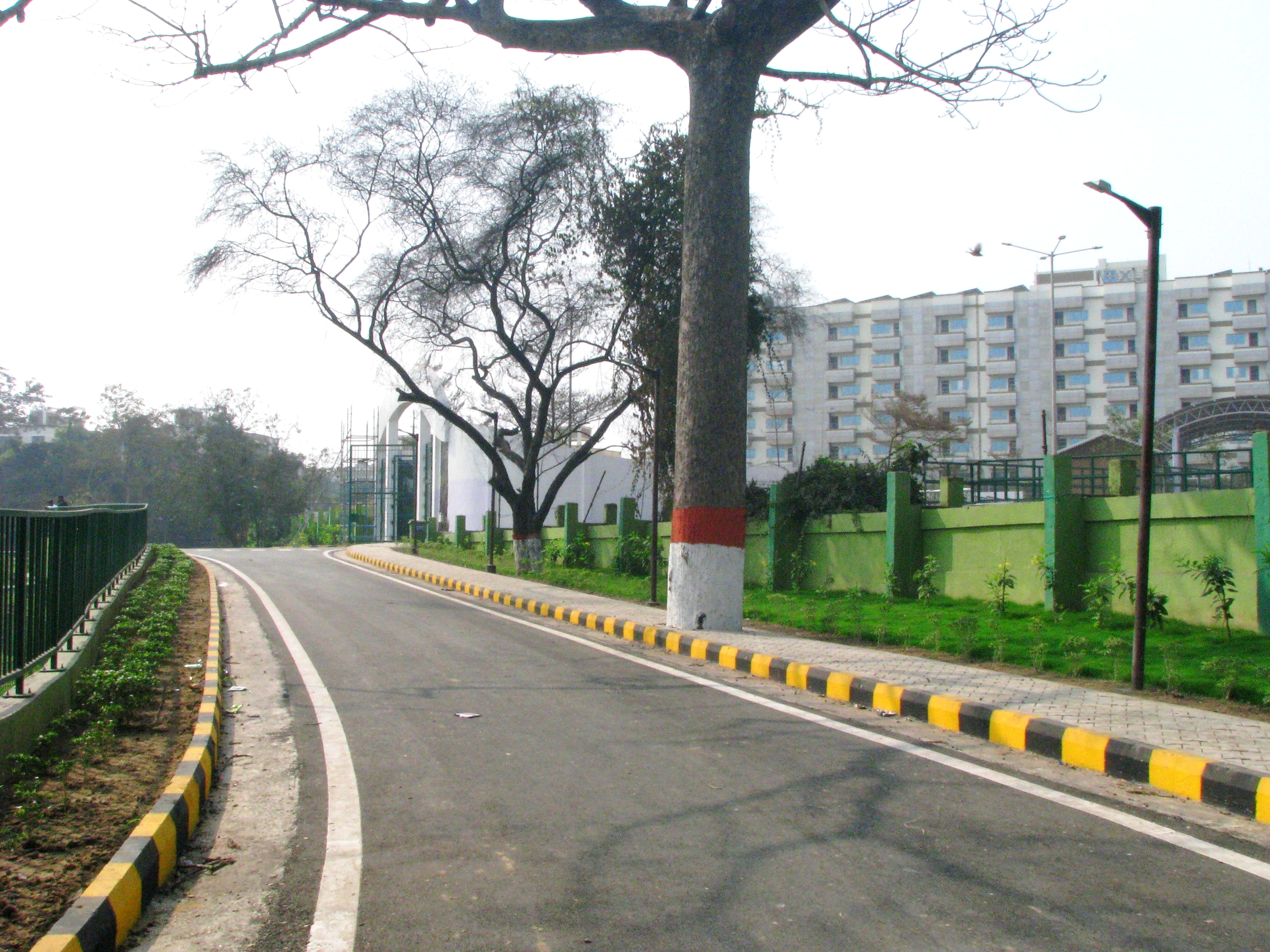
Exit Side of Tata Steel Zoological Park

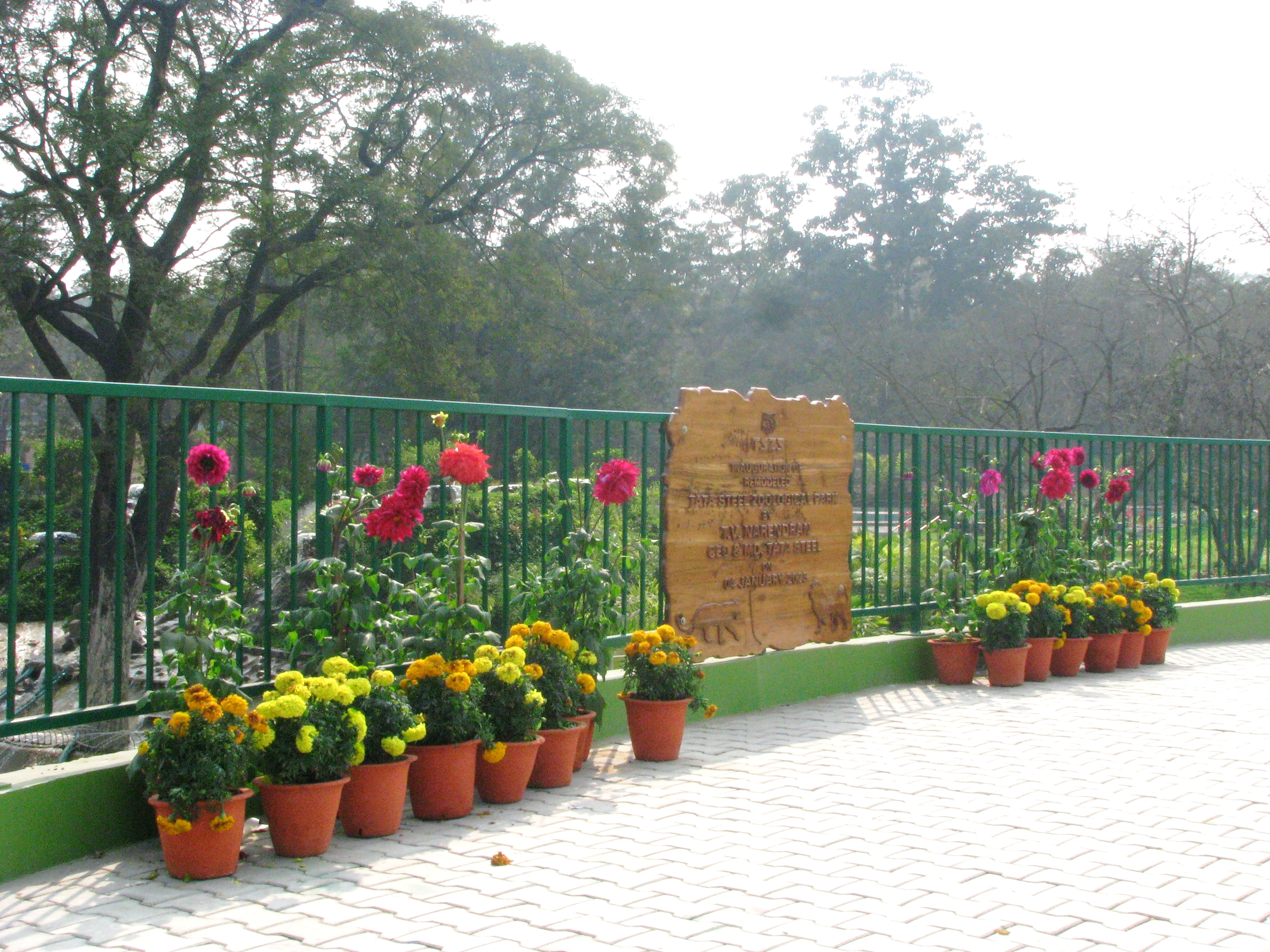

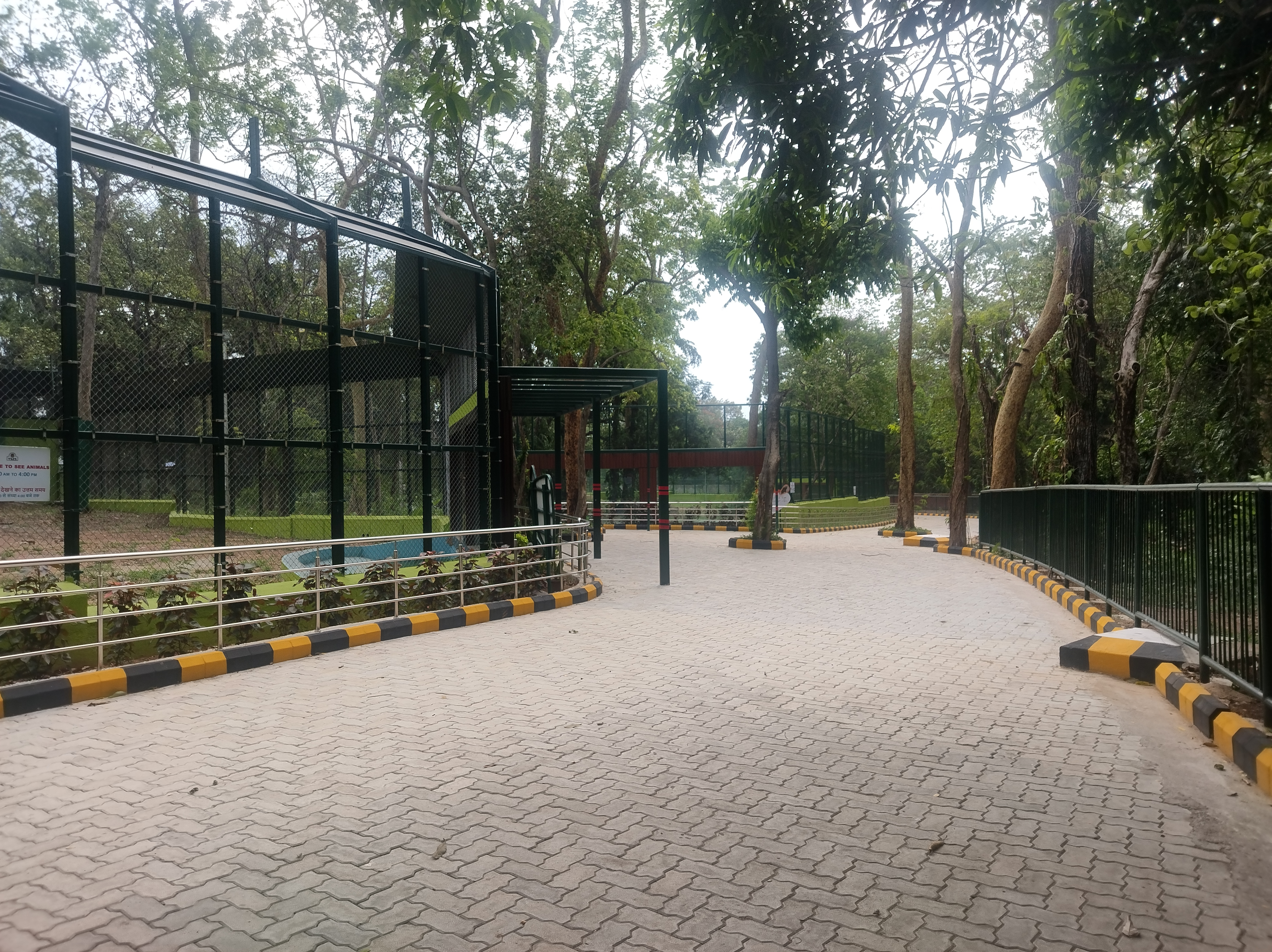
New Enclosures of Indian Leopard and Striped Hyena opened for public from 6th June 2024

Recently, Tata Steel Zoological Park was remodeled, and was inaugurated by Tata Steel MD and CEO TV Narendran on 7 January 2022. On the occasion of World Environment Day i.e., on 5 June 2024, the new enclosures of Leopard and Striped Hyena were inaugurated by Ravi Ranjan, Regional Chief Conservator of Forests, Government of Jharkhand and in the presence of Chanakya Chaudhary, Vice President of Corporate Services, Tata Steel and President, Tata Steel Zoological Society (TSZS), Raghunath Pandey, President, TSZS Workers’ Union, Captain Amitabh, Honorary Secretary, TSZS, and Naim Akhtar, Deputy Director, TSZP, among others. Subsequently on 8 January 2025, new enclosures for blackbuck and Nilgai was inaugurated.

== Animals and exhibits ==
The zoo is home to about 411 individual animals representing 50 species, including 18 species of mammals, 28 species of birds, and 4 species of reptiles. There are other animals planned to be housed by the Zoological Park in the future which consist of Giraffe, Mouse Deer, Indian giant Squirrel, Sarus crane, Demoiselle crane, Rosy Pelican, Adjutant stork, Military Macaw, Yellow Monitor & Indian Rock Python snake.

=== Mammals ===
- Sloth bear
- Blackbuck
- Indian hog deer
- Gray langur
- Leopard
- Bonnet macaque
- Rhesus macaque
- Bengal tiger
- Sambar deer
- Chital
- Indian muntjac
- Nilgai
- Striped hyena
- Hippopotamus
- Mandrill
- Indian crested porcupine
- African Lion
- Grant's zebra

=== Birds ===
- Peafowl
- Common hill myna
- Grey junglefowl
- Cockatiel
- Bar-headed goose
- Black-headed ibis
- Rainbow lorikeet
- Alexandrine parakeet
- Rose-ringed parakeet
- Red-breasted parakeet
- Red junglefowl
- Silver pheasant
- Reeves's pheasant
- Lady Amherst's pheasant
- Common pheasant
- Emu
- Ostrich
- Sulphur-crested cockatoo
- Grey parrot
- Great white pelican
- Indian eagle-owl
- Budgerigar
- Java sparrow
- Helmeted guineafowl
- Japanese quail

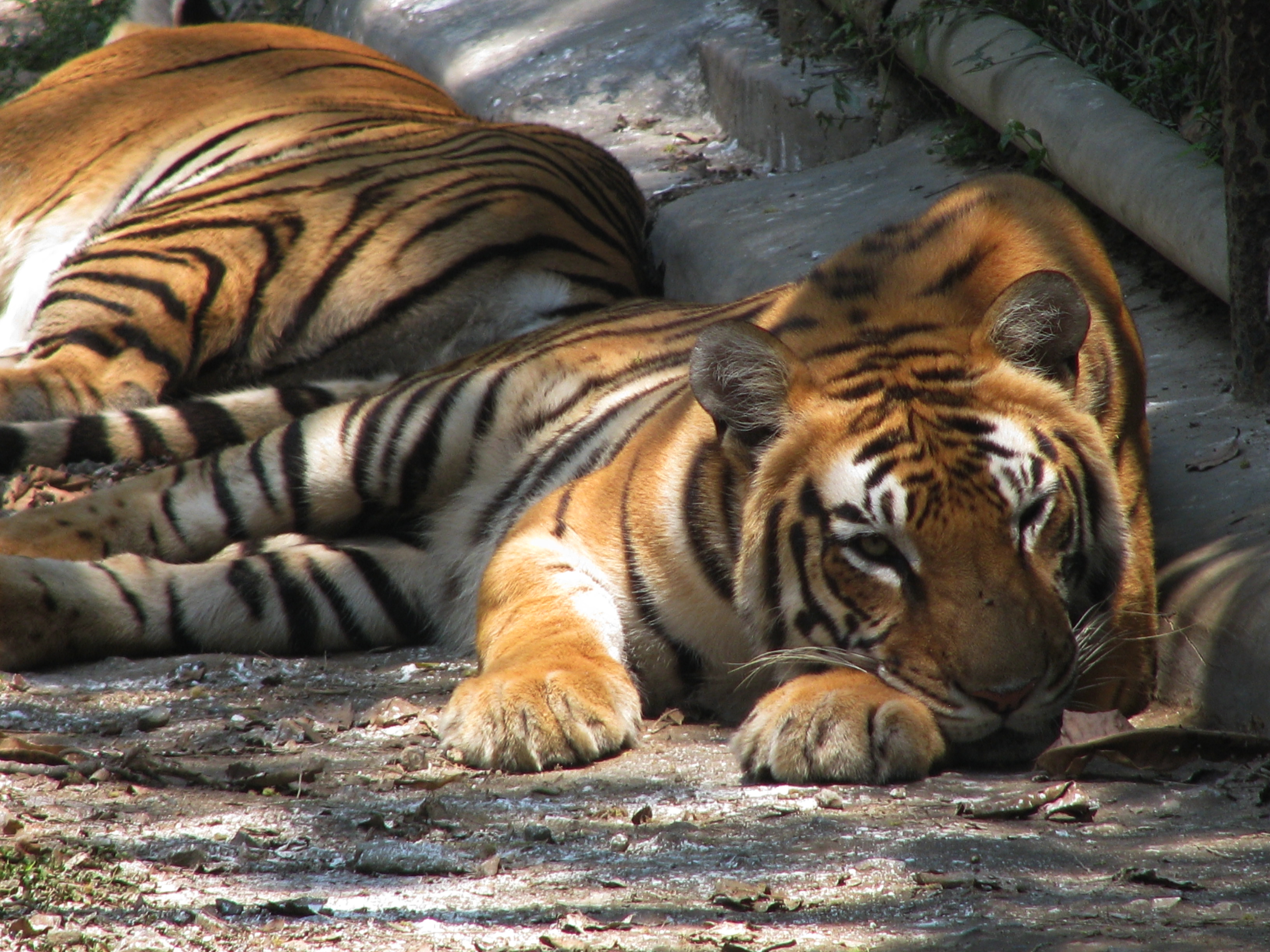
Sleepy Royal Bengal Tiger at Tata Steel Zoological Park

=== Reptiles ===
- Gharial
- Mugger crocodile
- Red-eared slider
- Indian star tortoise

== Gallery ==
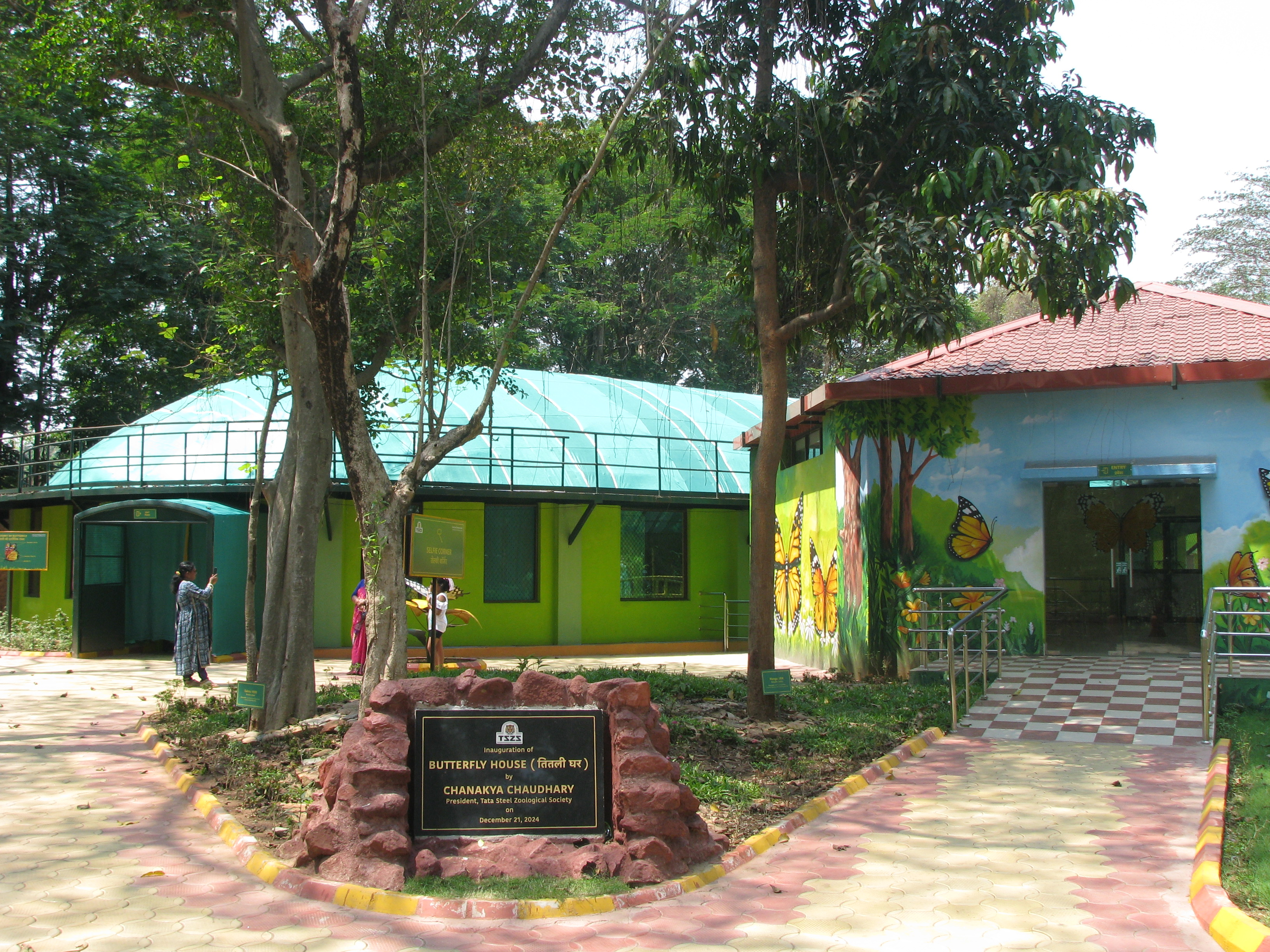
New Butterfly House at Tata Steel Zoological Park

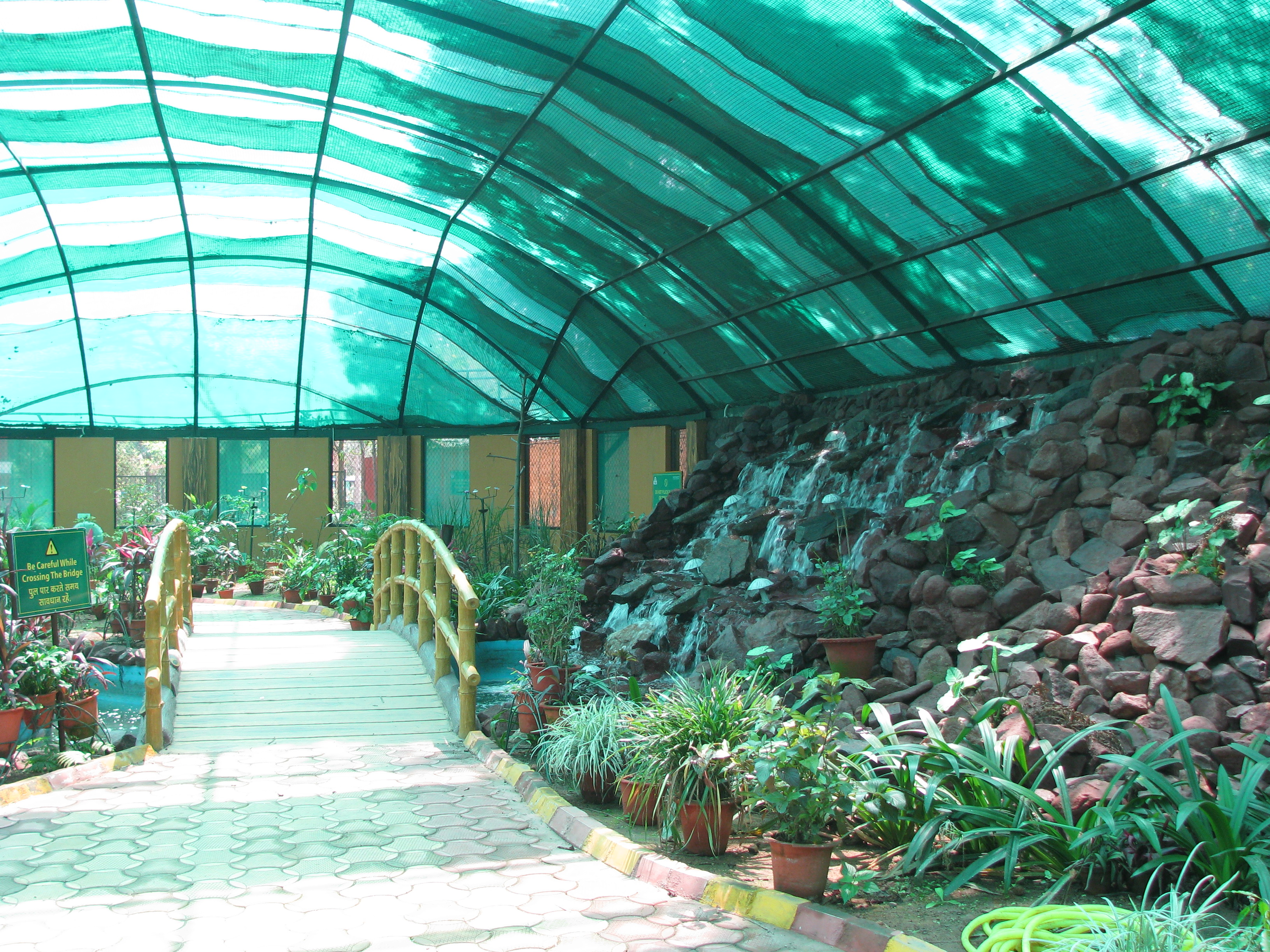
Interior of Butterfly House at Tata Steel Zoological Park

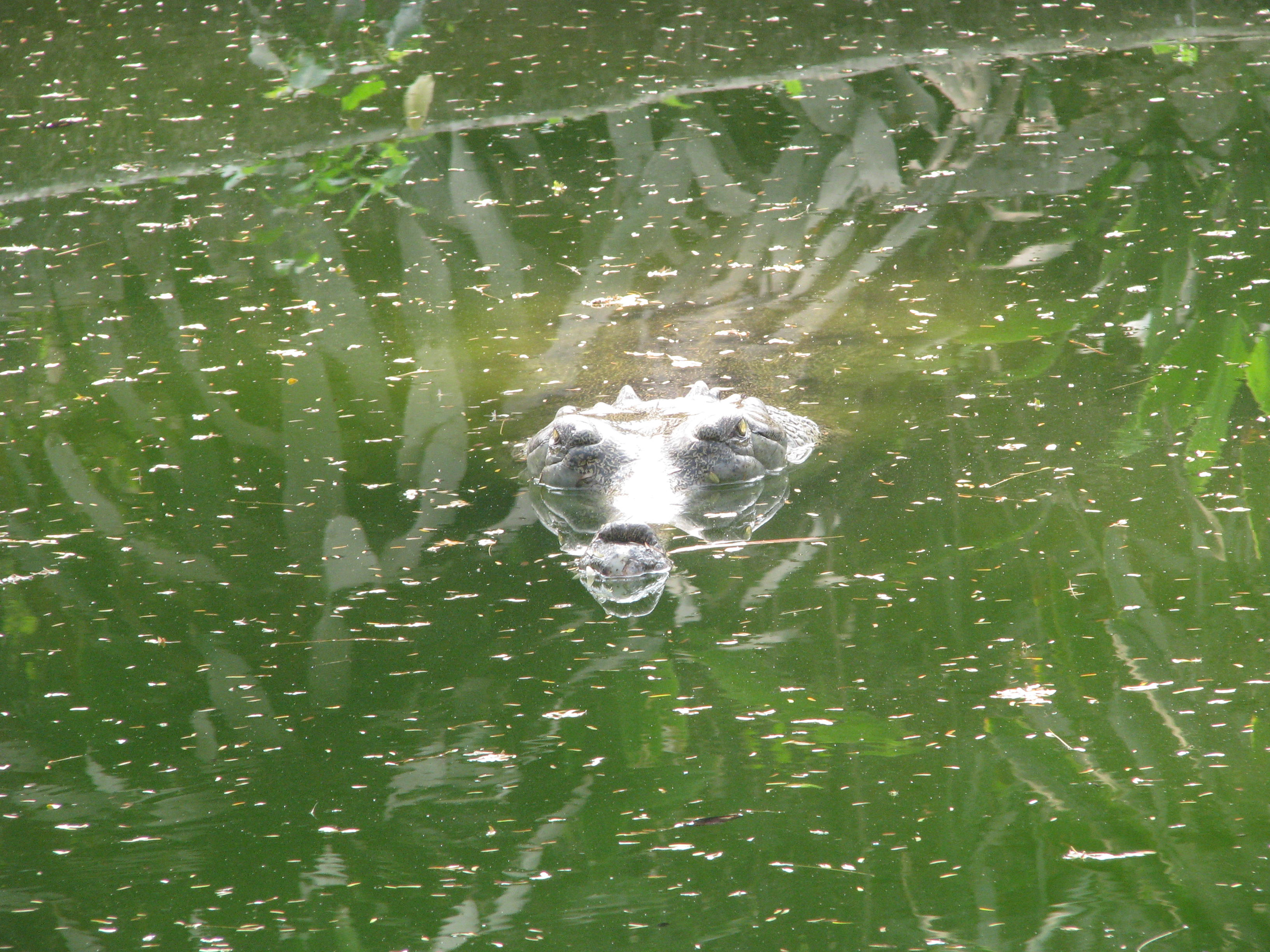
Underwater Gharial

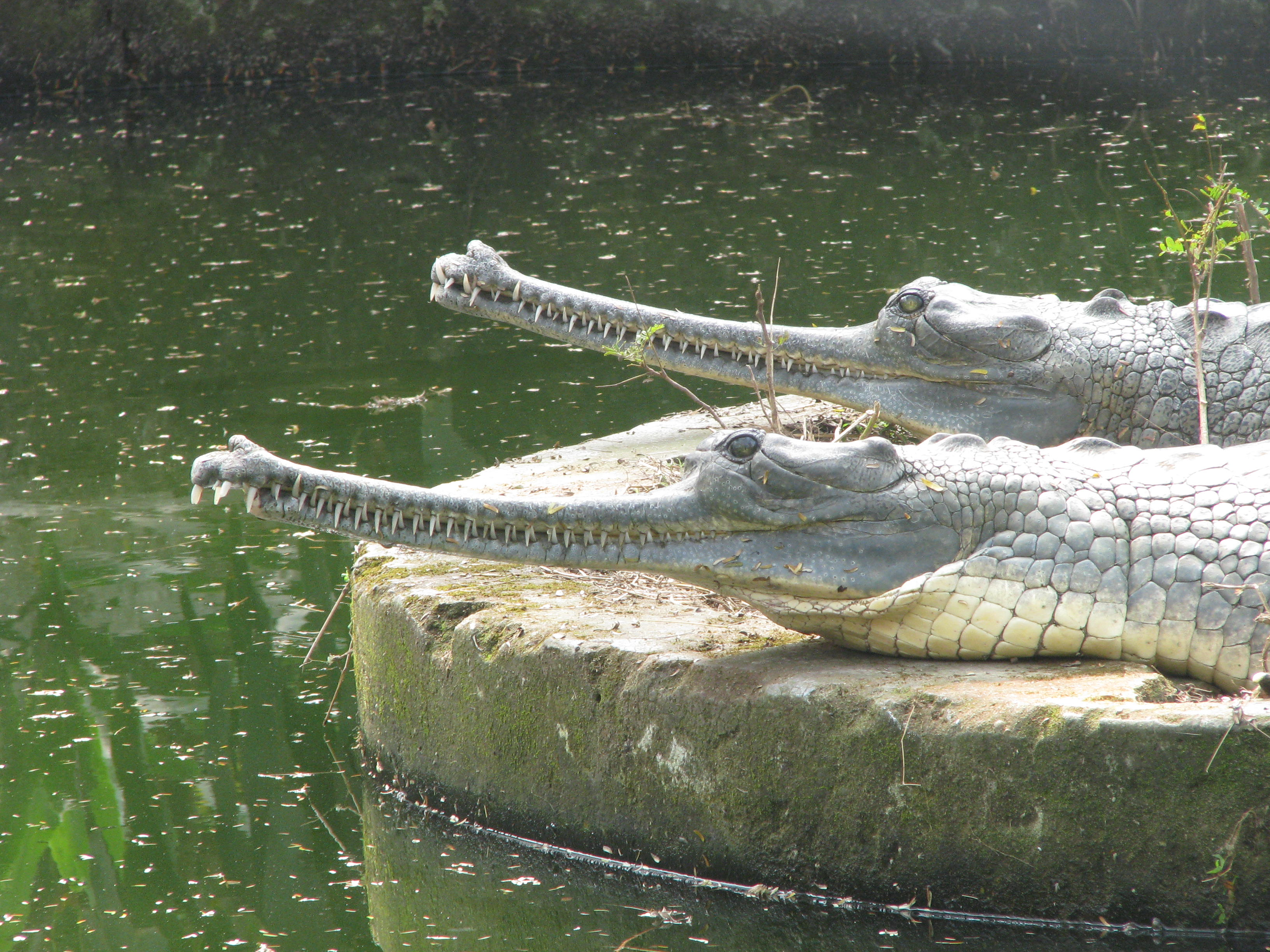
Gharial

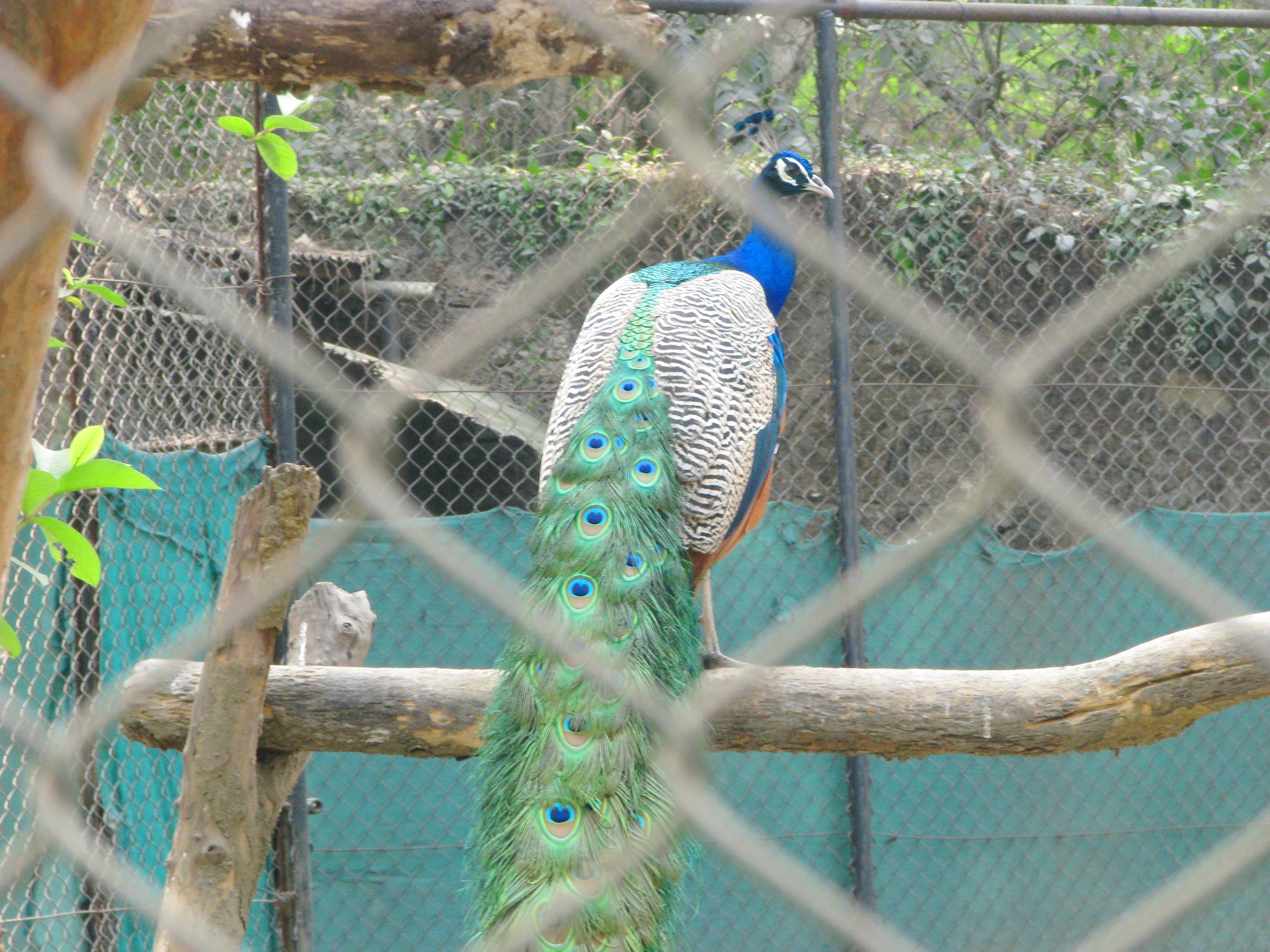
Adult Indian peafowl

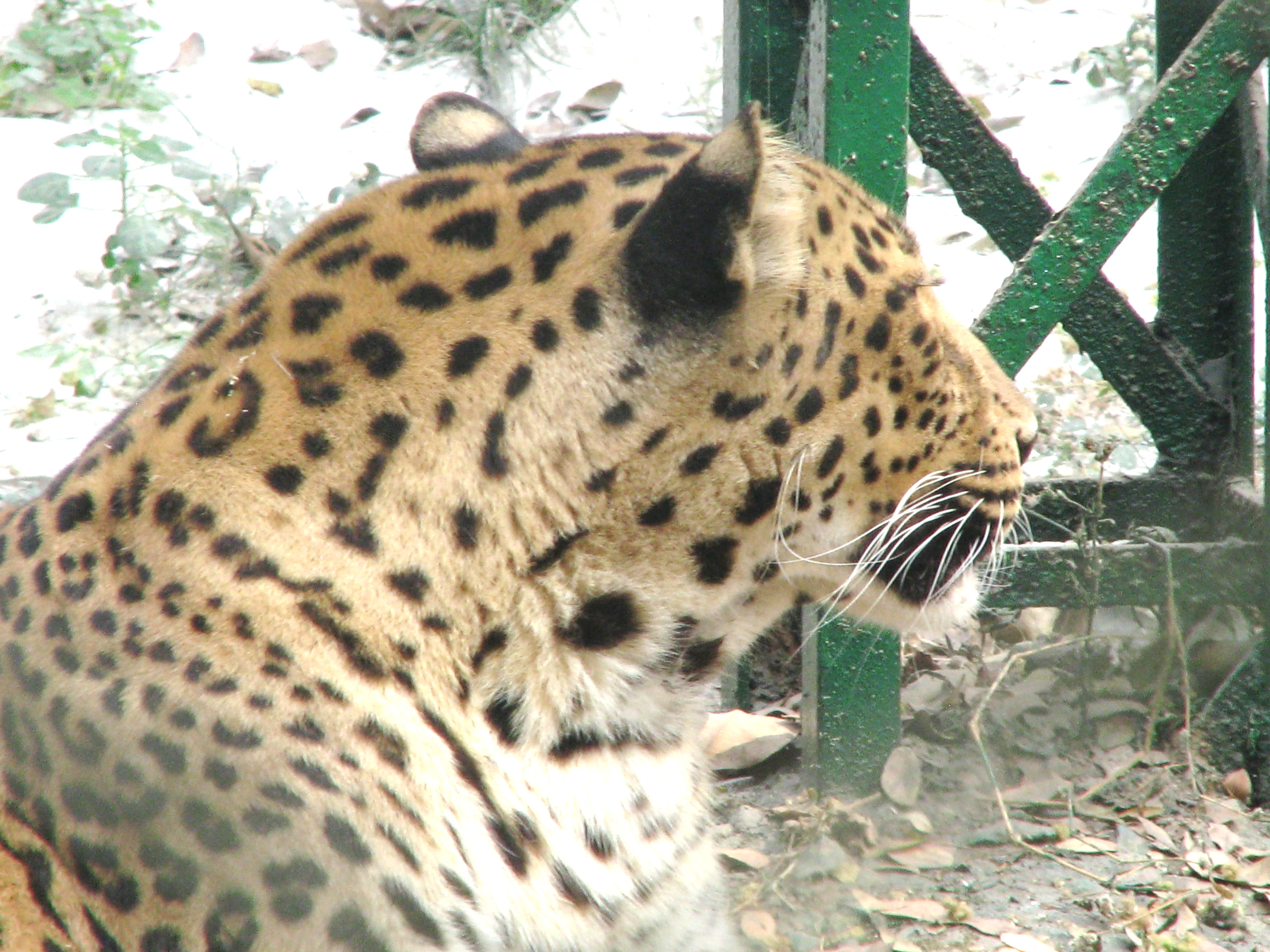
Leopard

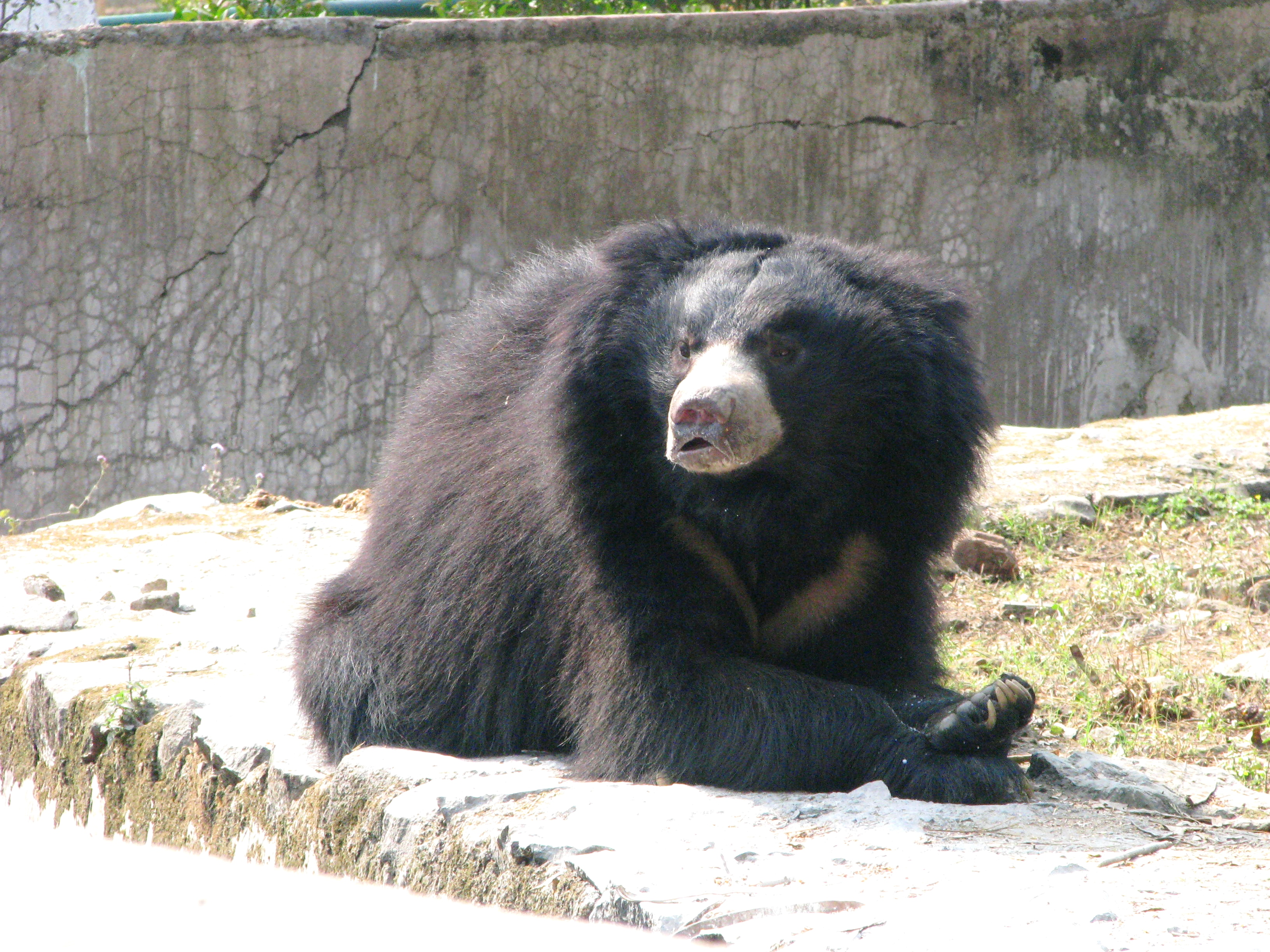
Sloth bear

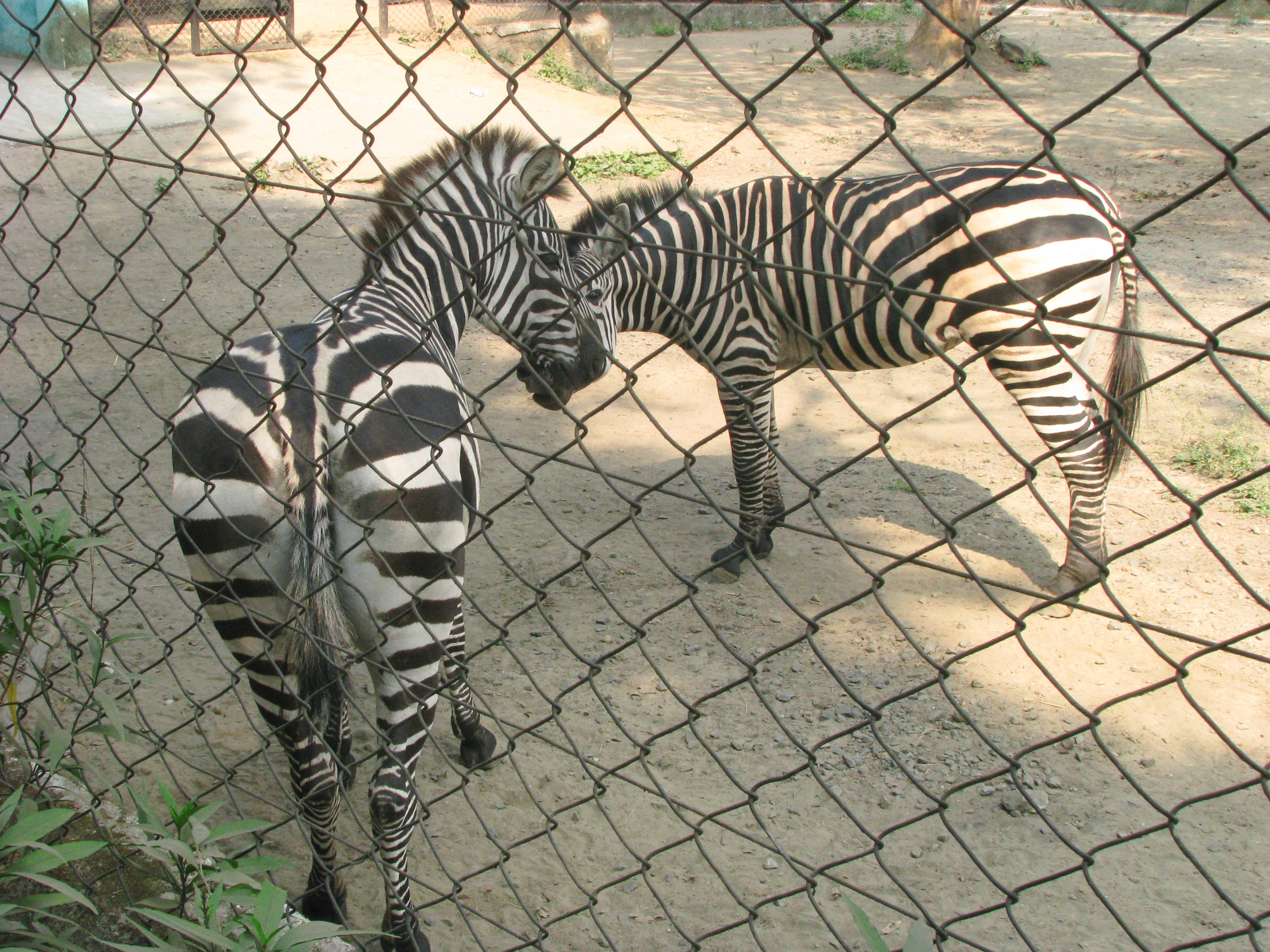
Young Grant's zebras

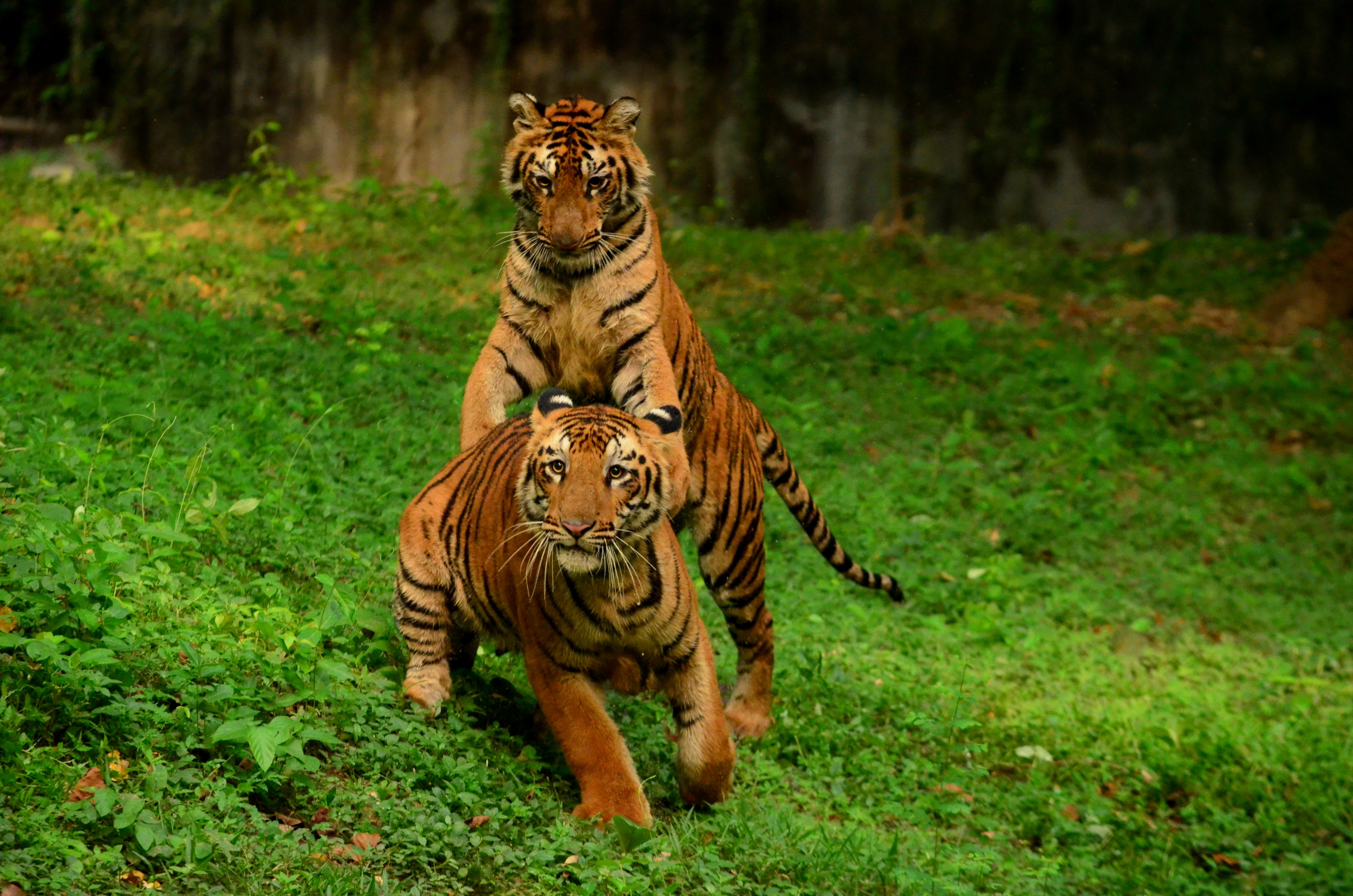
Bengal tiger cubs mock fight

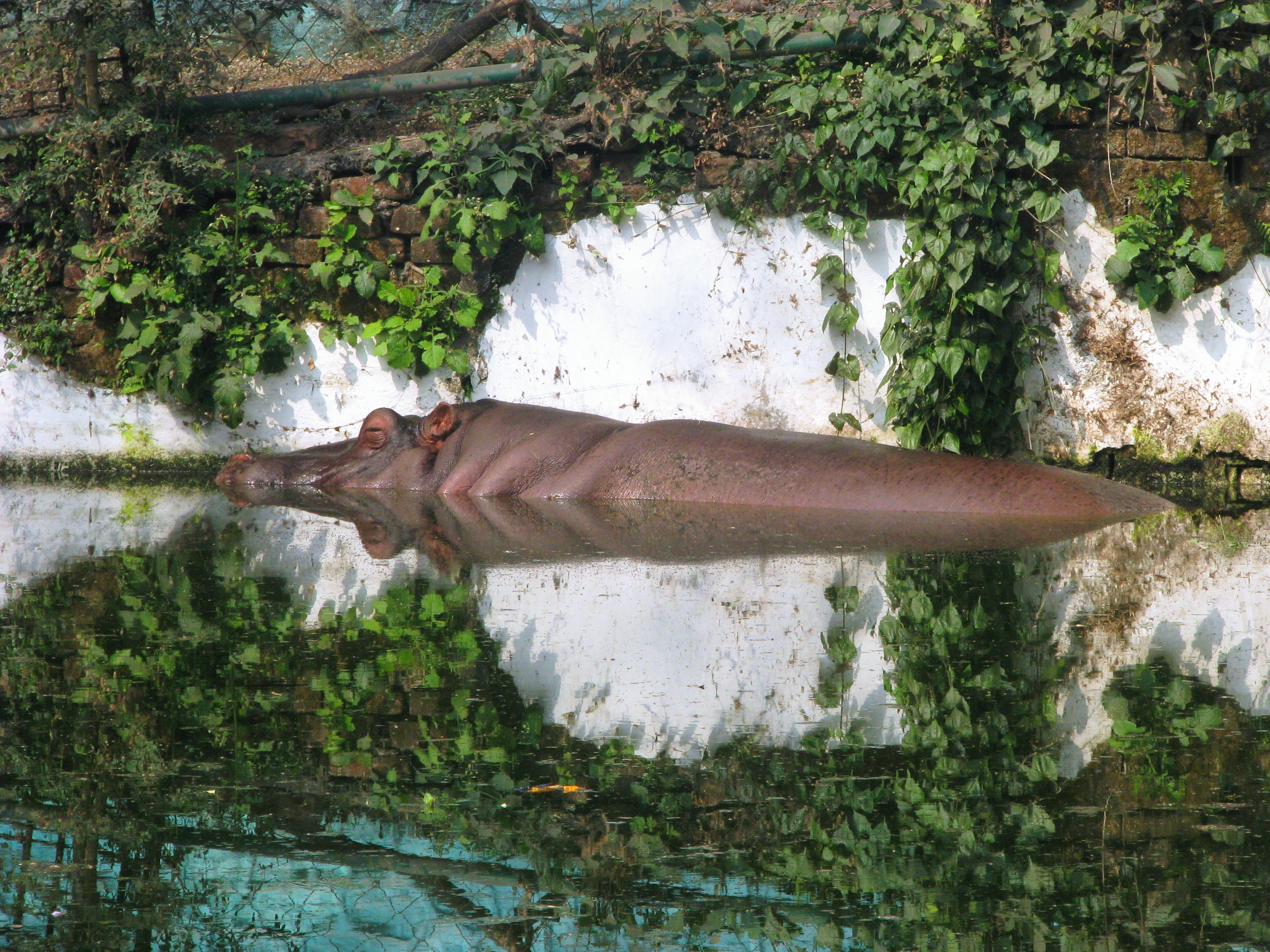
Aged Male Hippopotamus

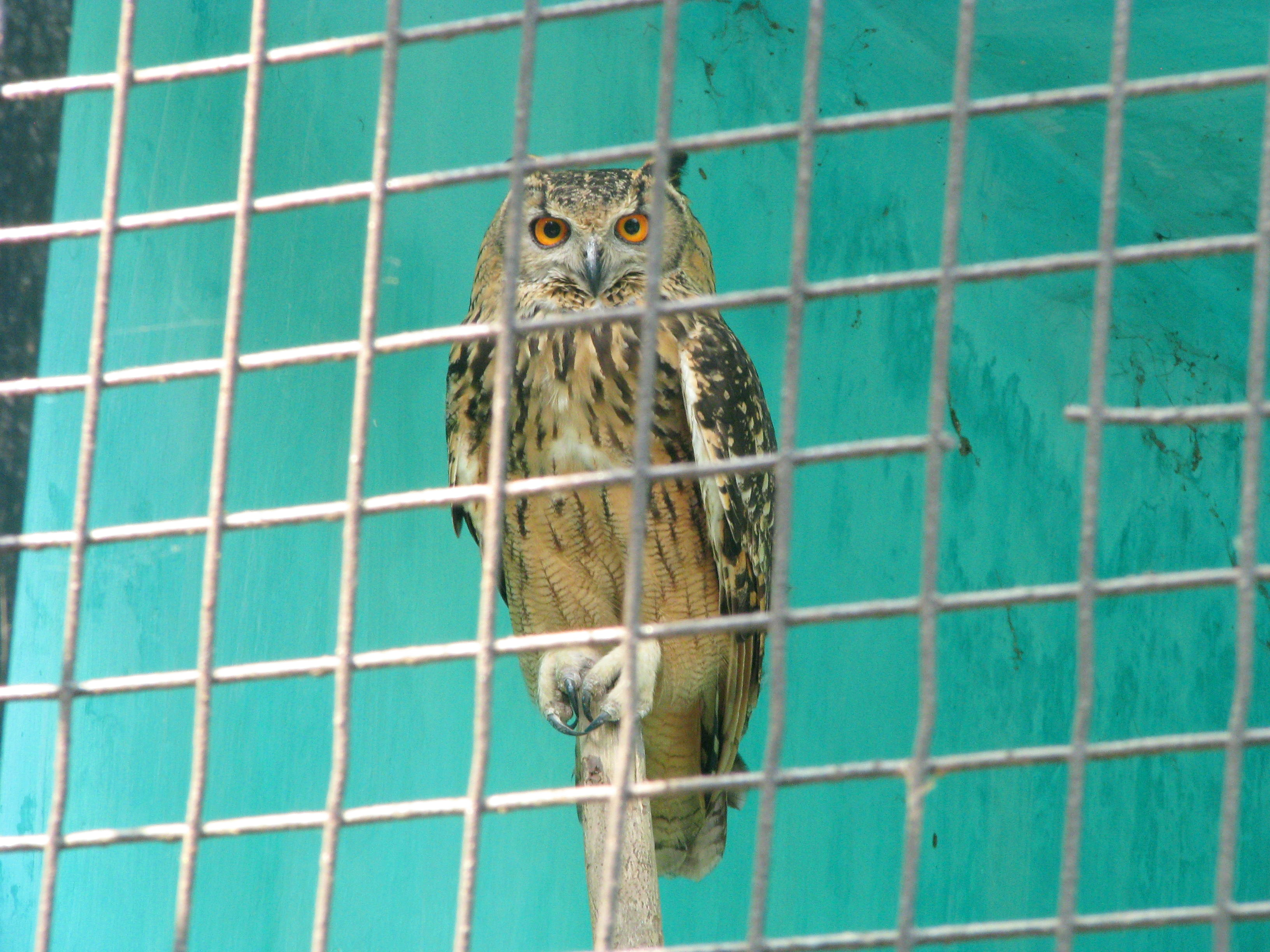
Indian eagle-owl

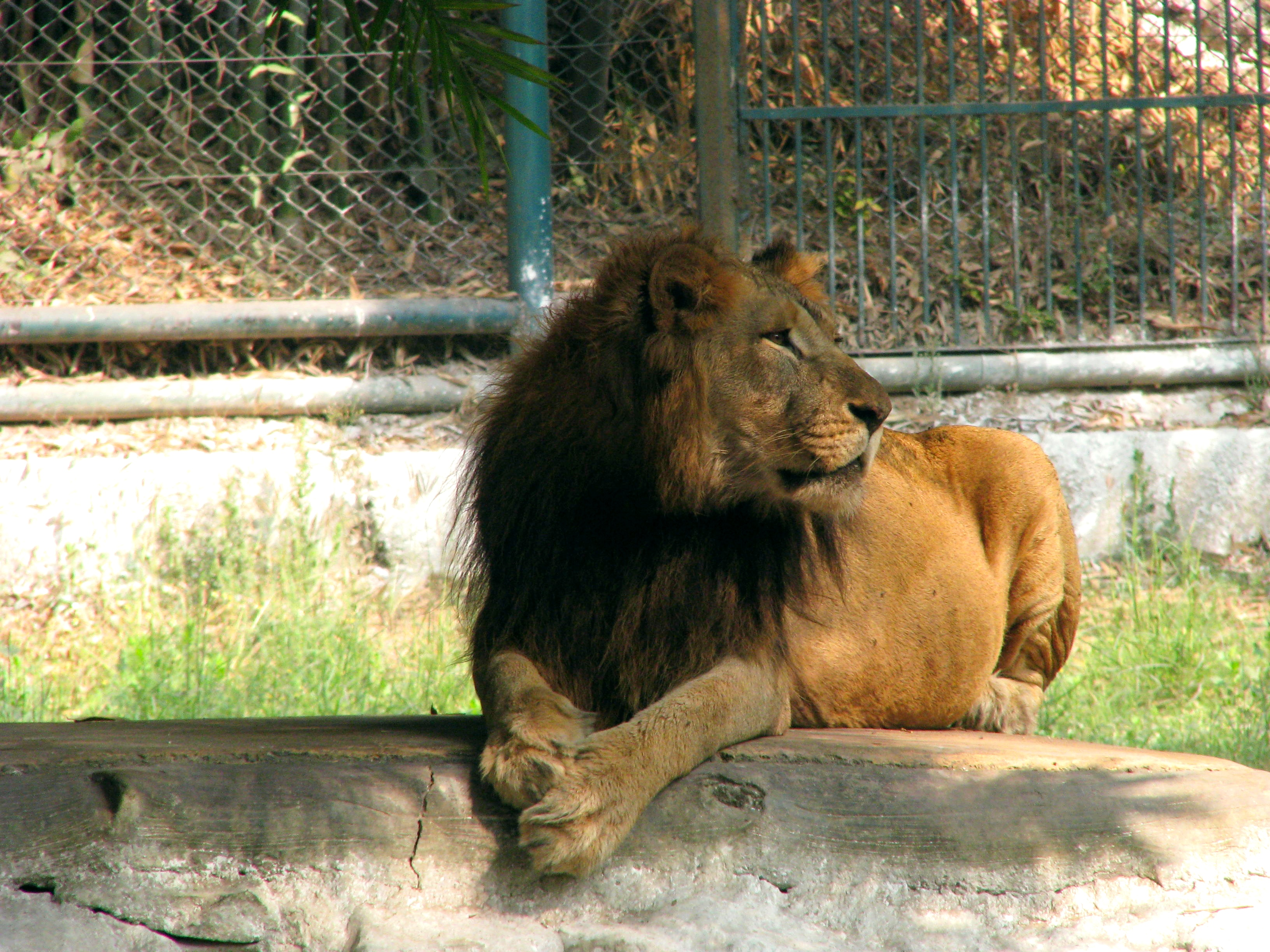
Male South African Lion

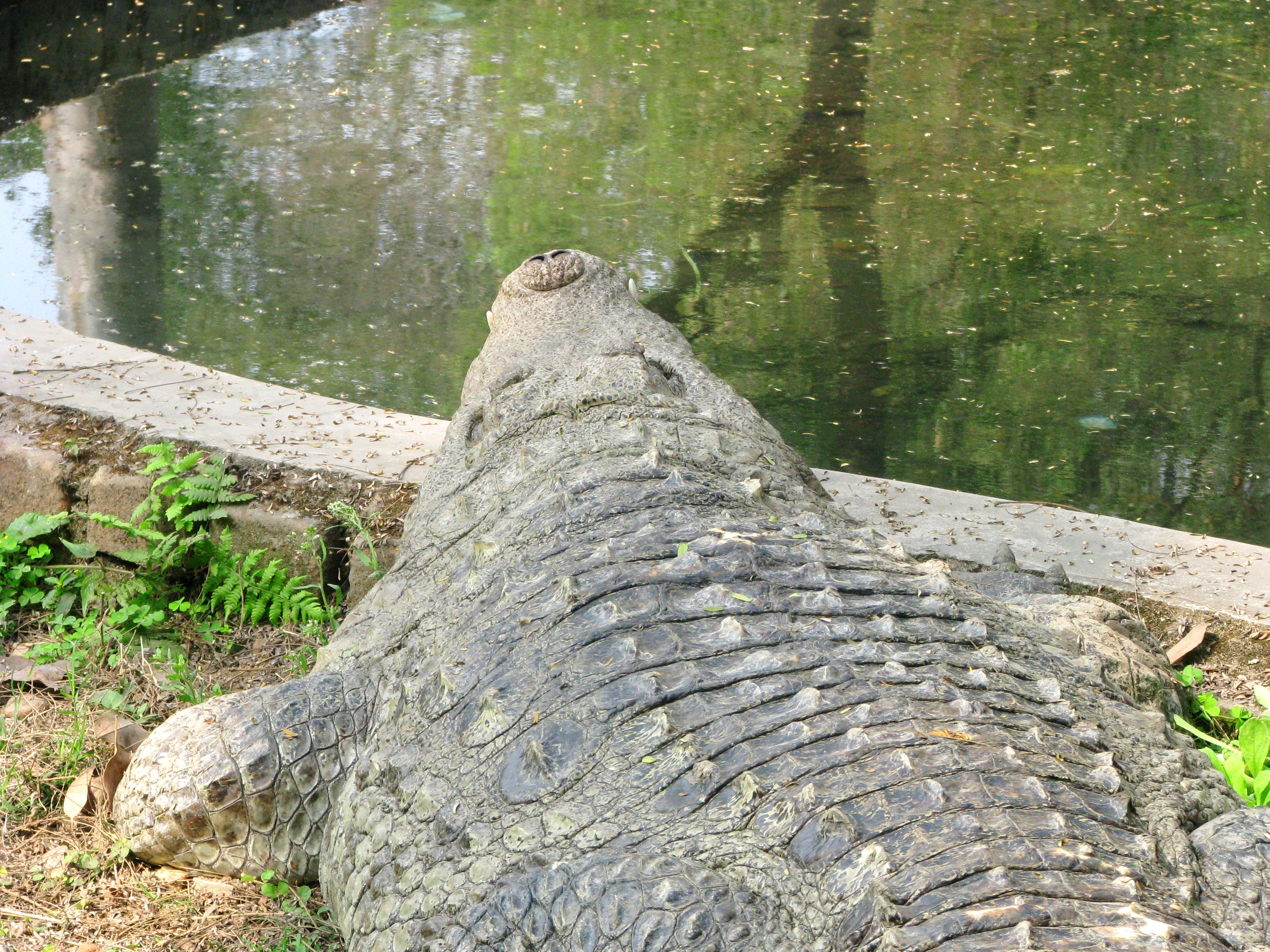
Lazy Mugger crocodile

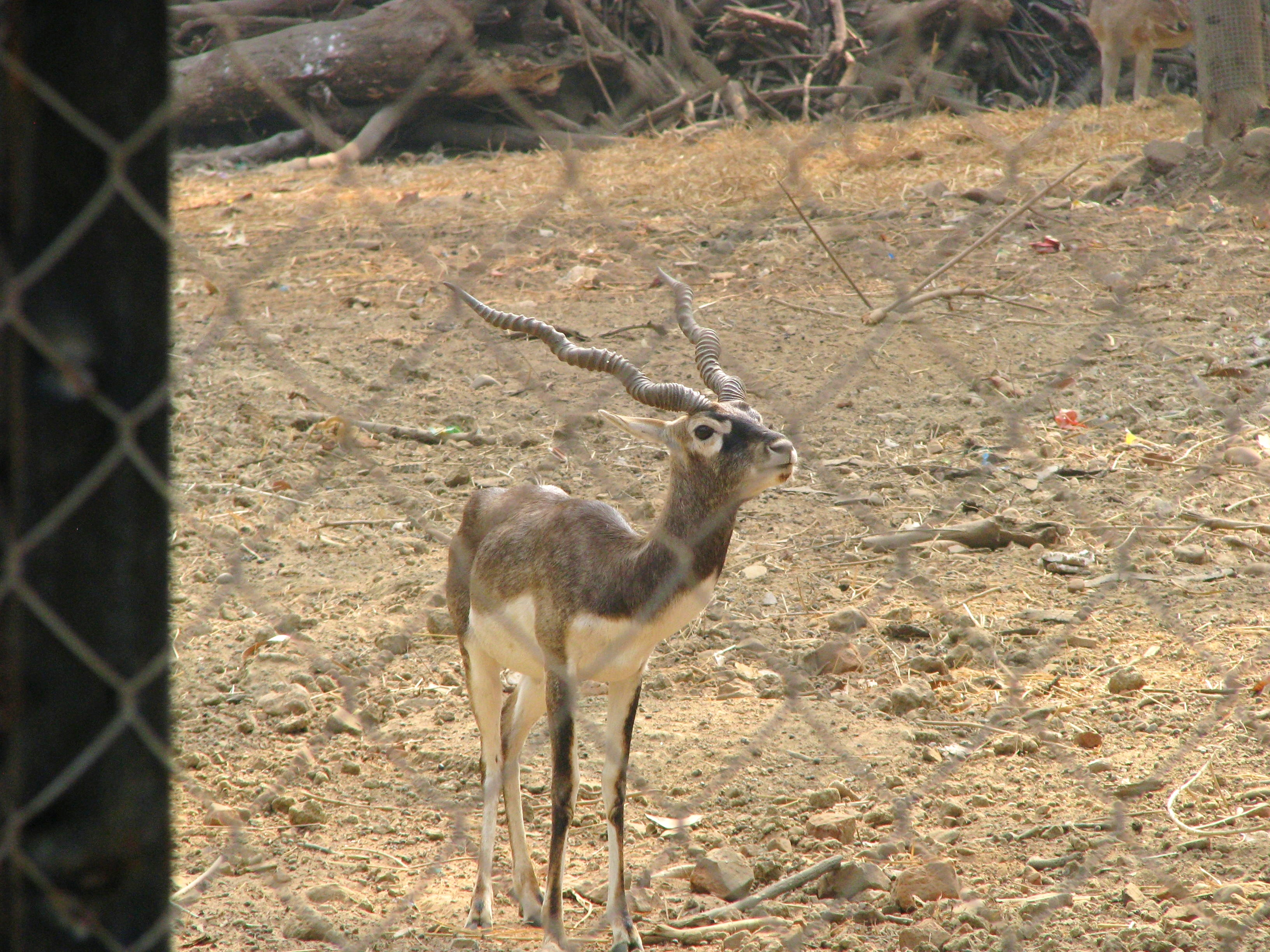
Blackbuck

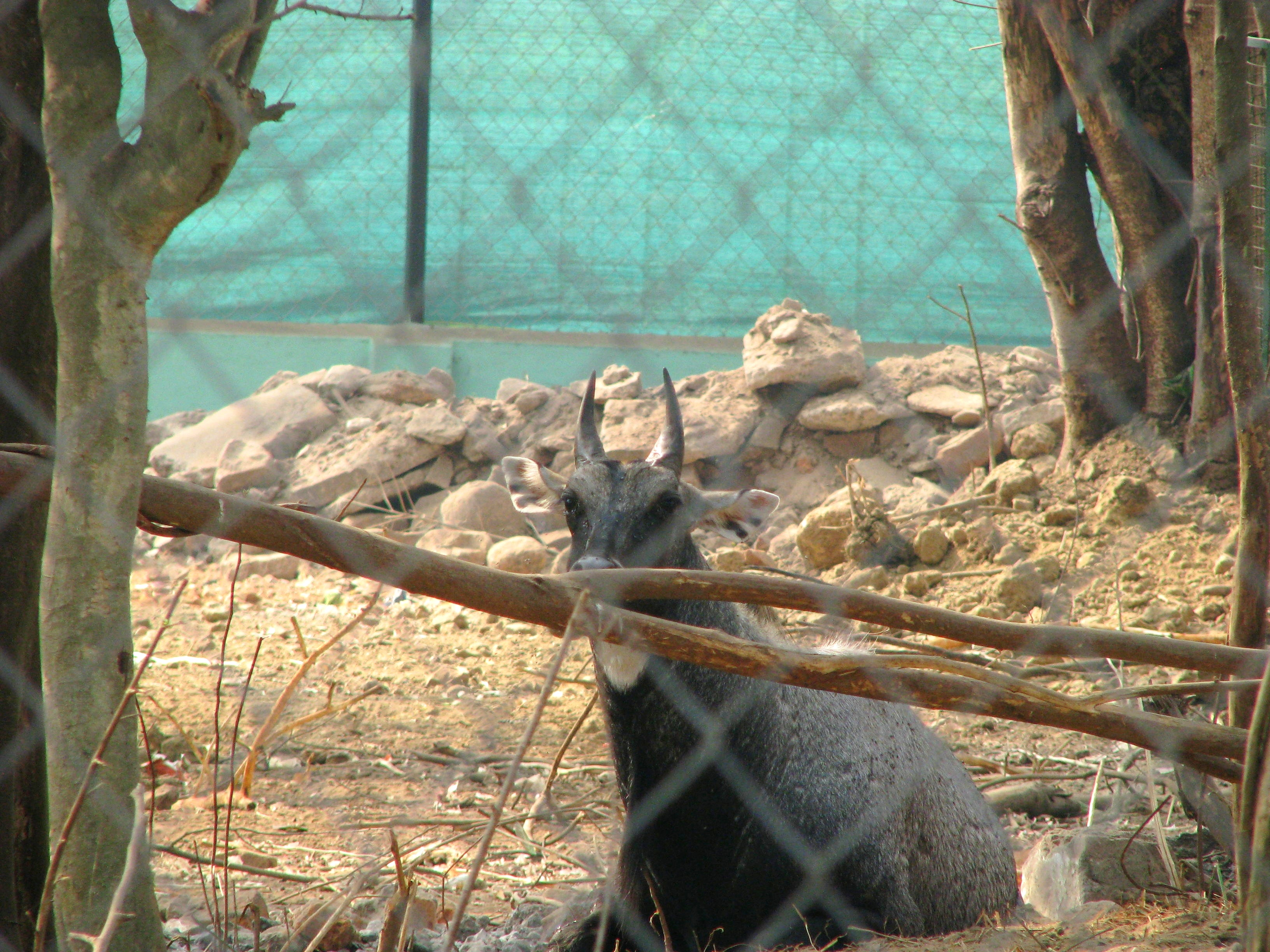
Nilgai

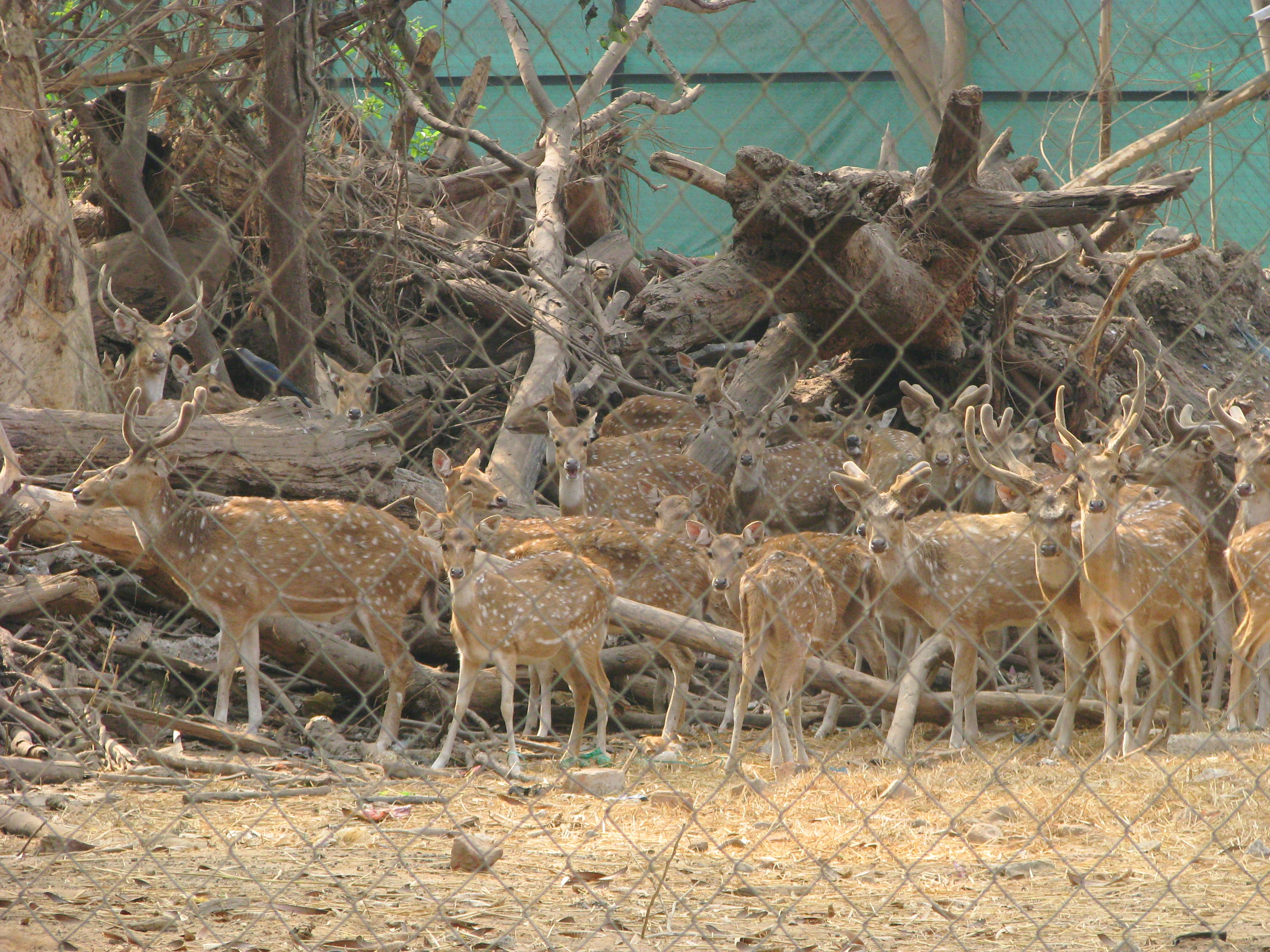
Group of Spotted Deer at the New Enclosure

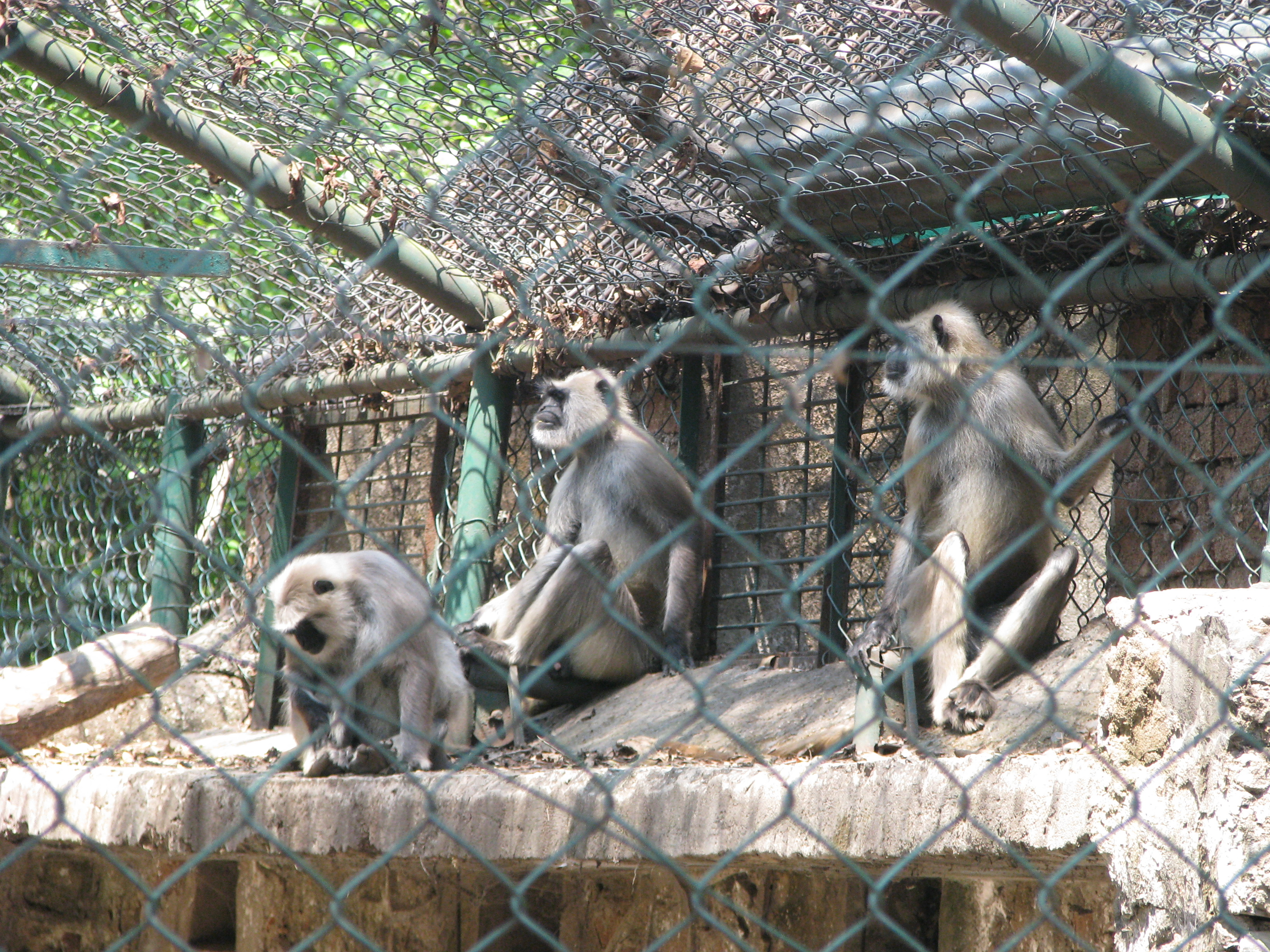
Hanuman Langurs

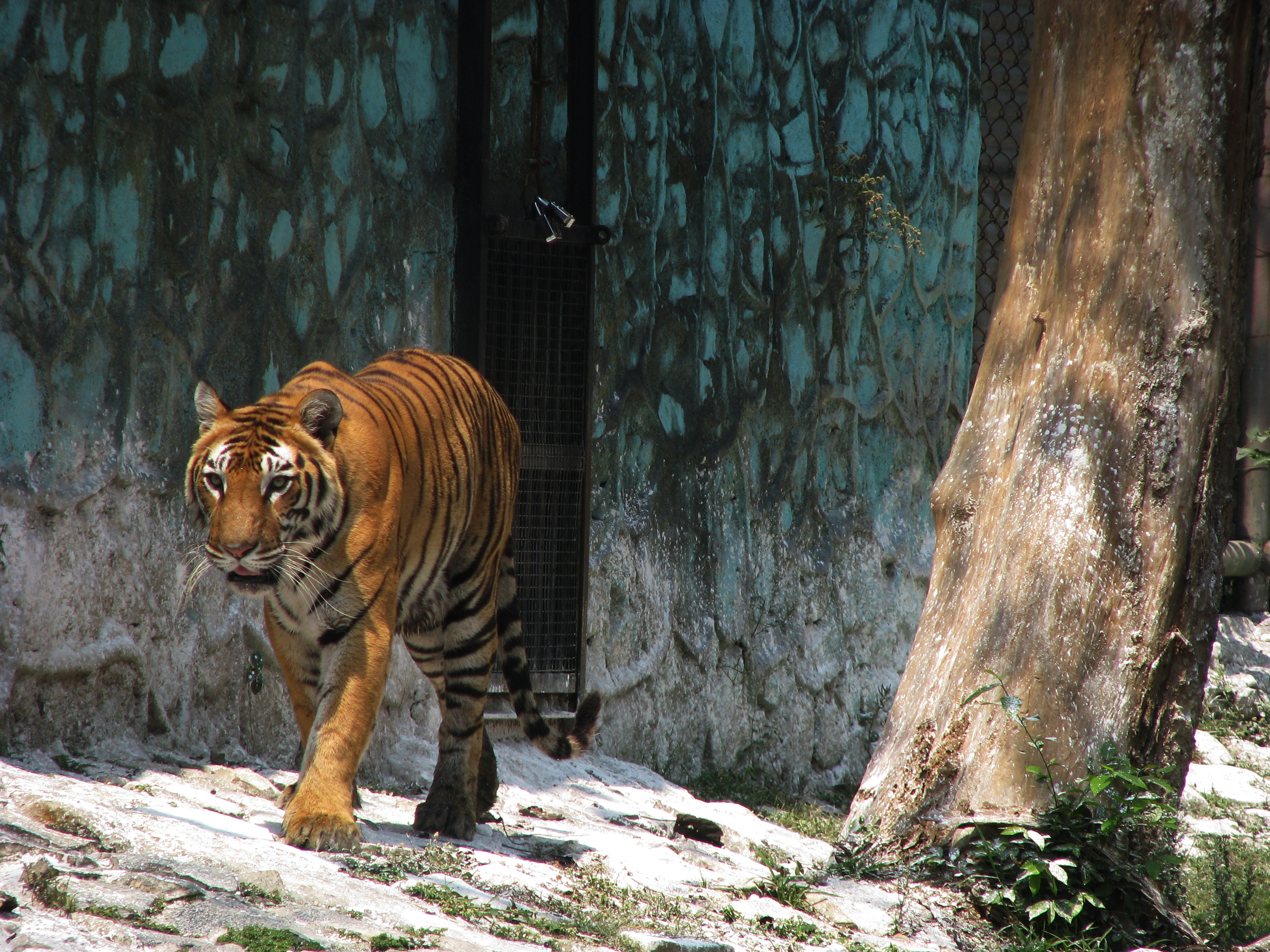
Royal Bengal Tiger of Tata Steel Zoological Park

== See also ==
- P&M Hi-Tech City Centre Mall
- Dalma Wildlife Sanctuary
- Rankini Temple, Jadugora
- Jubilee Park, Jamshedpur
