= Jubilee Park, Jamshedpur =

Largest Park in Jamshedpur, Jharkhand, India

Jubilee Park
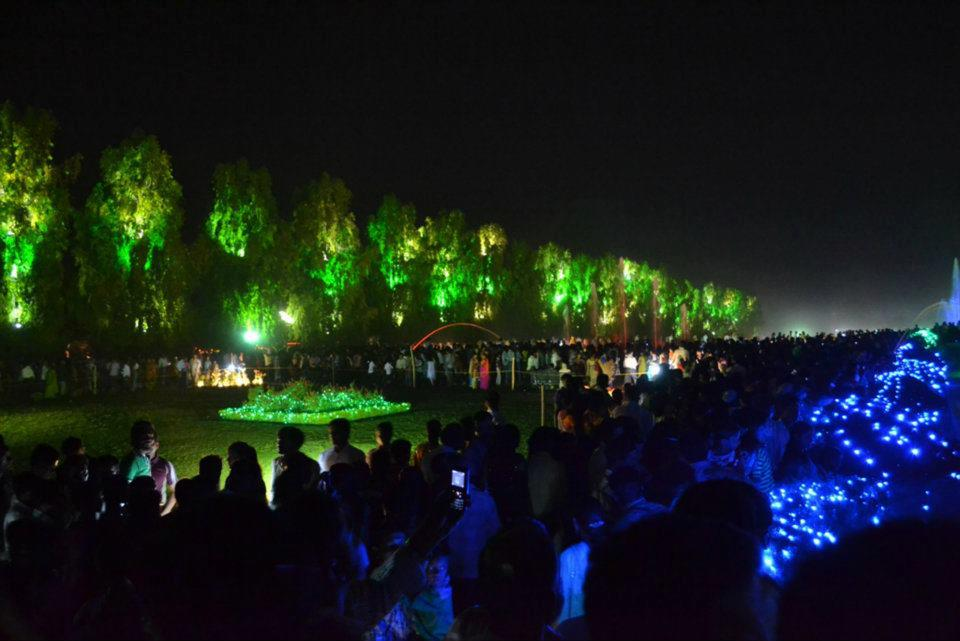
- Interactive map of Jubilee Park
- Location: Sakchi, Jamshedpur, Jharkhand, India
- Coordinates: 22.810037°N 86.195158°E
- Opened: August 1958
- Owner: Tata Steel
- Operated by: Tata Steel
- Theme: Park
- Area: 200 acres (0.81 km^{2})
- Website: Official website

Jubilee Park is an urban park located in Jamshedpur, Jharkhand, India. It is a popular destination for all those who wish to have an outdoor picnic, enjoy some outdoor activities and games or even just to have a relaxing day out with friends and family. Popular amongst joggers and cyclists, it is a gigantic park, recreation centre, fountains and a zoo, amongst other attractions.

This local attraction was opened to the public in 1958, on the occasion of the city's golden jubilee, the 50th anniversary of establishment. This park was originally a gift to the town of Tatanagar(Jamshedpur) from the Tata Steel Company.

While being built under the visionary Jamsetji Tata, the Brindavan Gardens in Mysore were used as an inspiration. This park also shows off a status of Jamsetji Tata and is also known as the Mughal Gardens of Jamshedpur. The presence of the Tata Steel Zoological Park, Nicco Jubilee Amusement Park, Jayanti Sarovar(Zoo Lake), Bat Island, Children's Park, and Rose Garden is part of the reason why this park is such a famous one.

== Features ==
The entire park is spread over 200 acres (0.81 km^{2}) of land located in the neighbourhood of Sakchi. It is one of the five largest urban parks of India along with Cubbon Park (Bangalore), Shivaji Park (Mumbai), Chandrashekhar Azad Park or Alfred Park (Allahabad) and Maidan (Kolkata). Jubilee Park provides inner connectivity of the park. In the vicinity of Jubilee other parks —Tata Steel Zoological Park and Nicco Water Jubilee Park are located. Jayanti Sarovar is a man made lake in the center of Jubilee Park where an island called the Bat Island is located there.

The Tata Steel Zoological Park is a zoo and a safari park known for Bengal tiger. In the safari region the tigers are left free and visitors travel in a safari jeep. Nicco Water Park is a water park adjacent to it. It is home to all water rides as well as swimming pools. Recently it has also become a wedding spot. Rose Garden is located at a slight corner of Jubilee Road. Nicco Amusement Park is an amusement park, a part of it home to numerous rides. The laser fountain show of Jubilee Park is popular. On the occasion of Founder's Day, the park is decorated with lights and fountains.

== Gallery ==
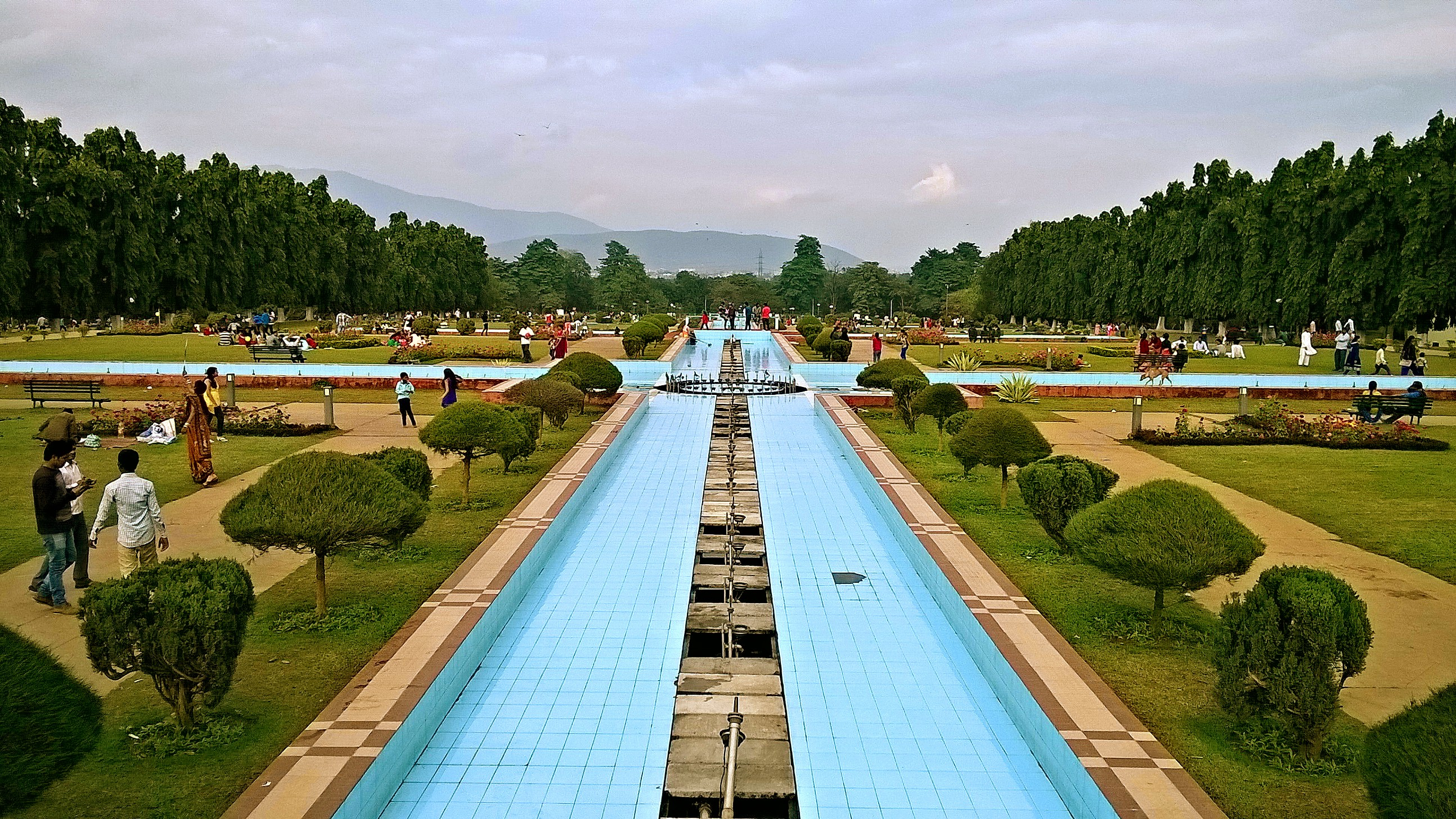
A view of jamshedpur jubilee park

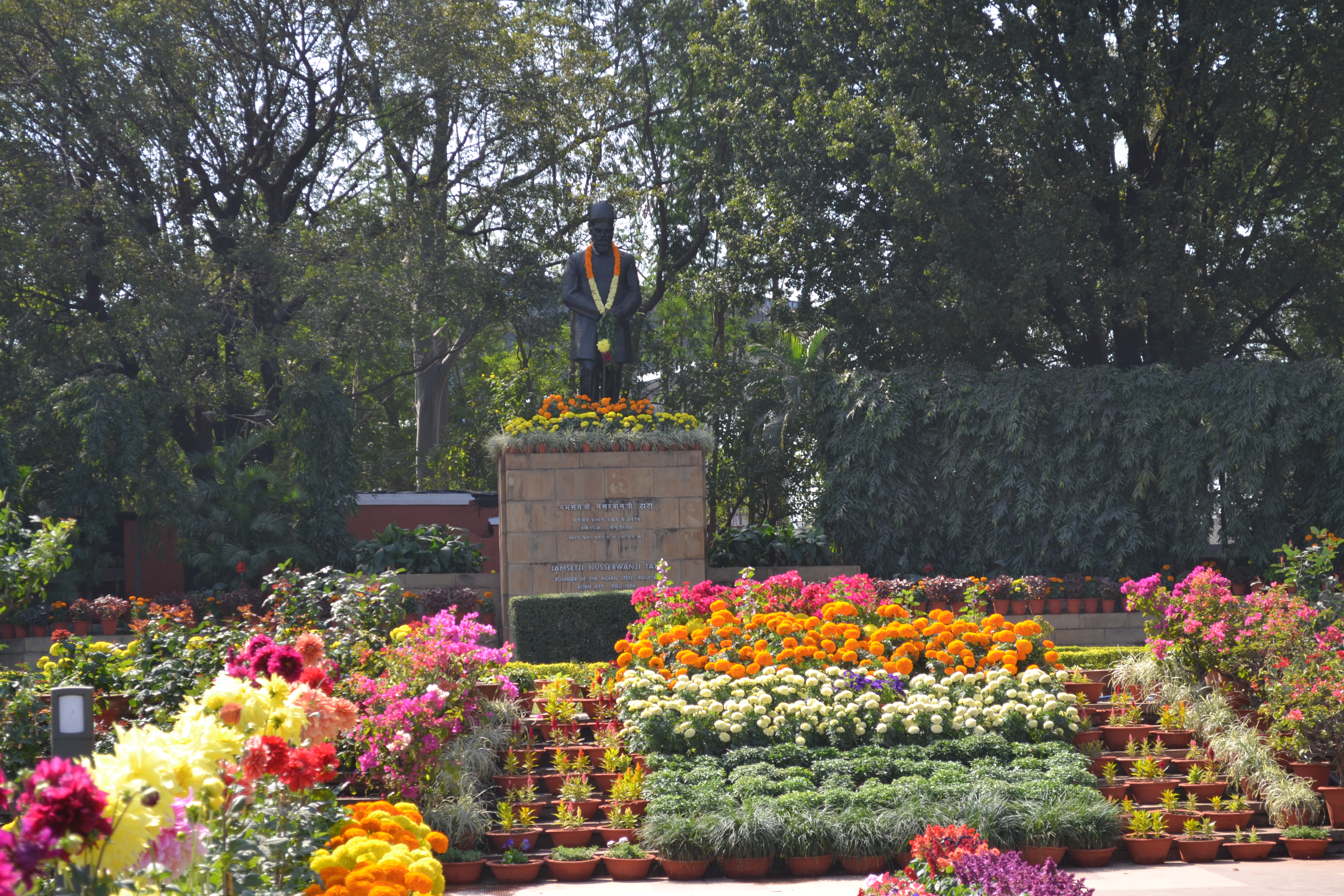
Statue of jamsetji tata

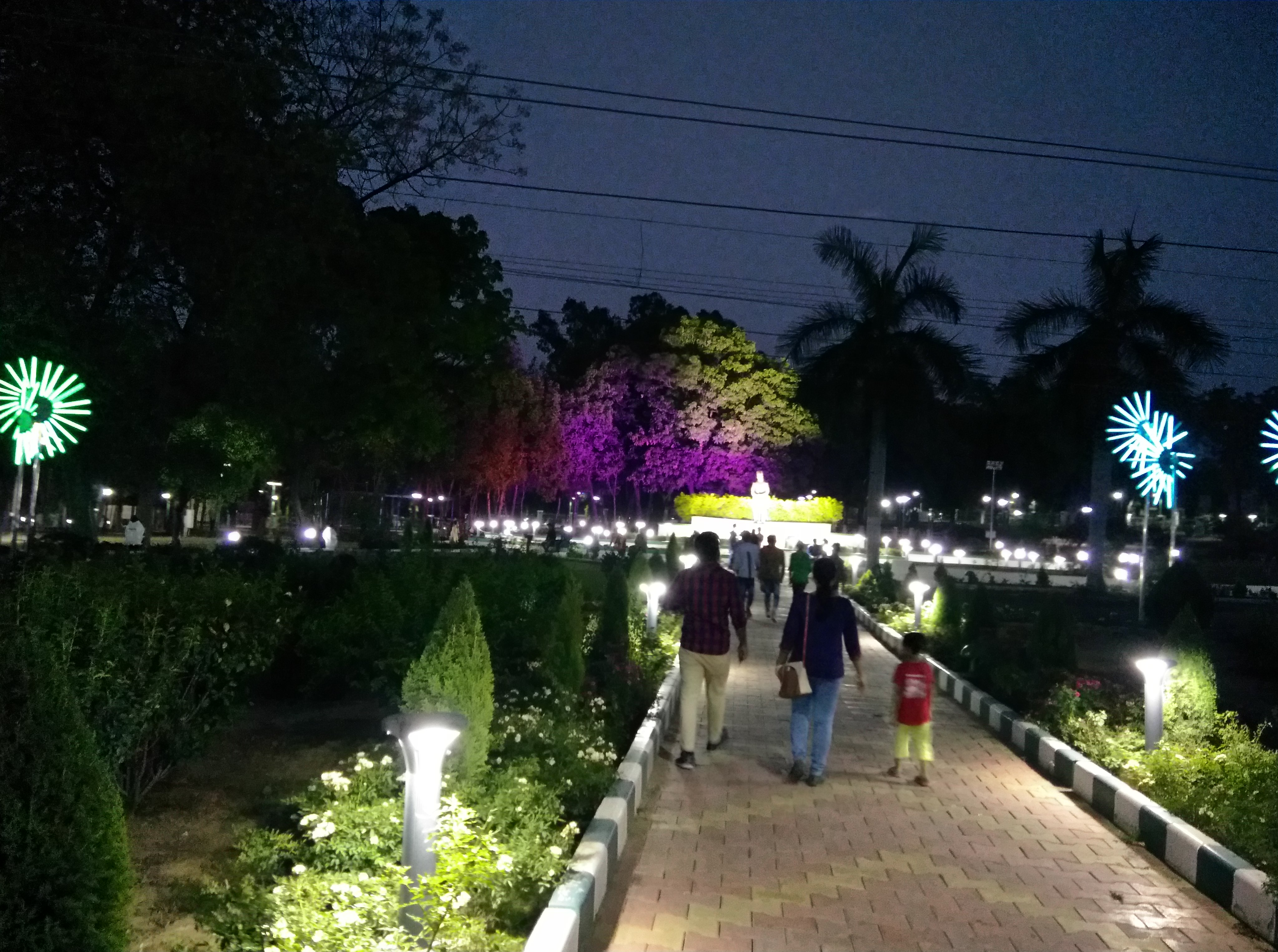
JP Night

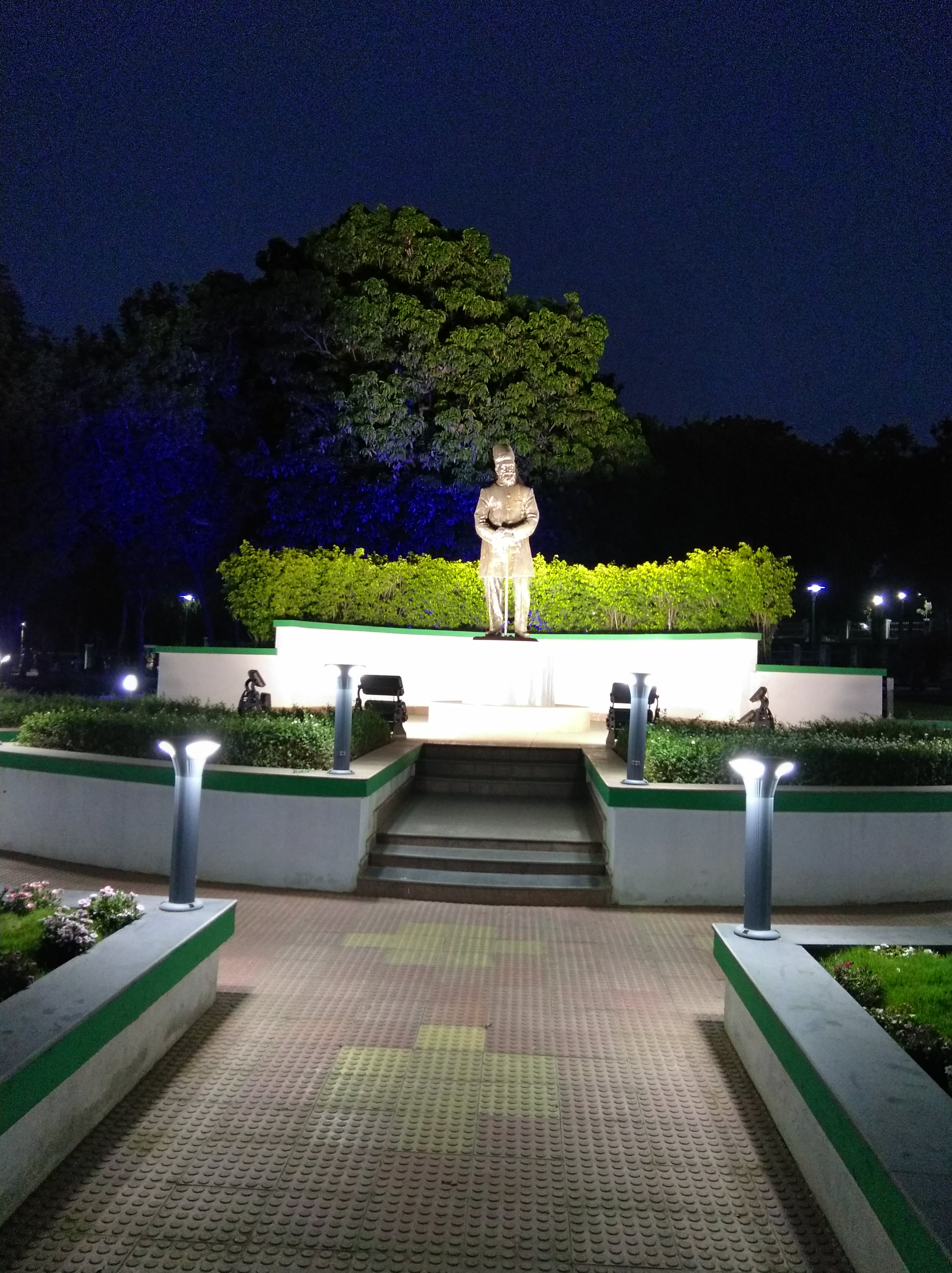
JP JRD Statue

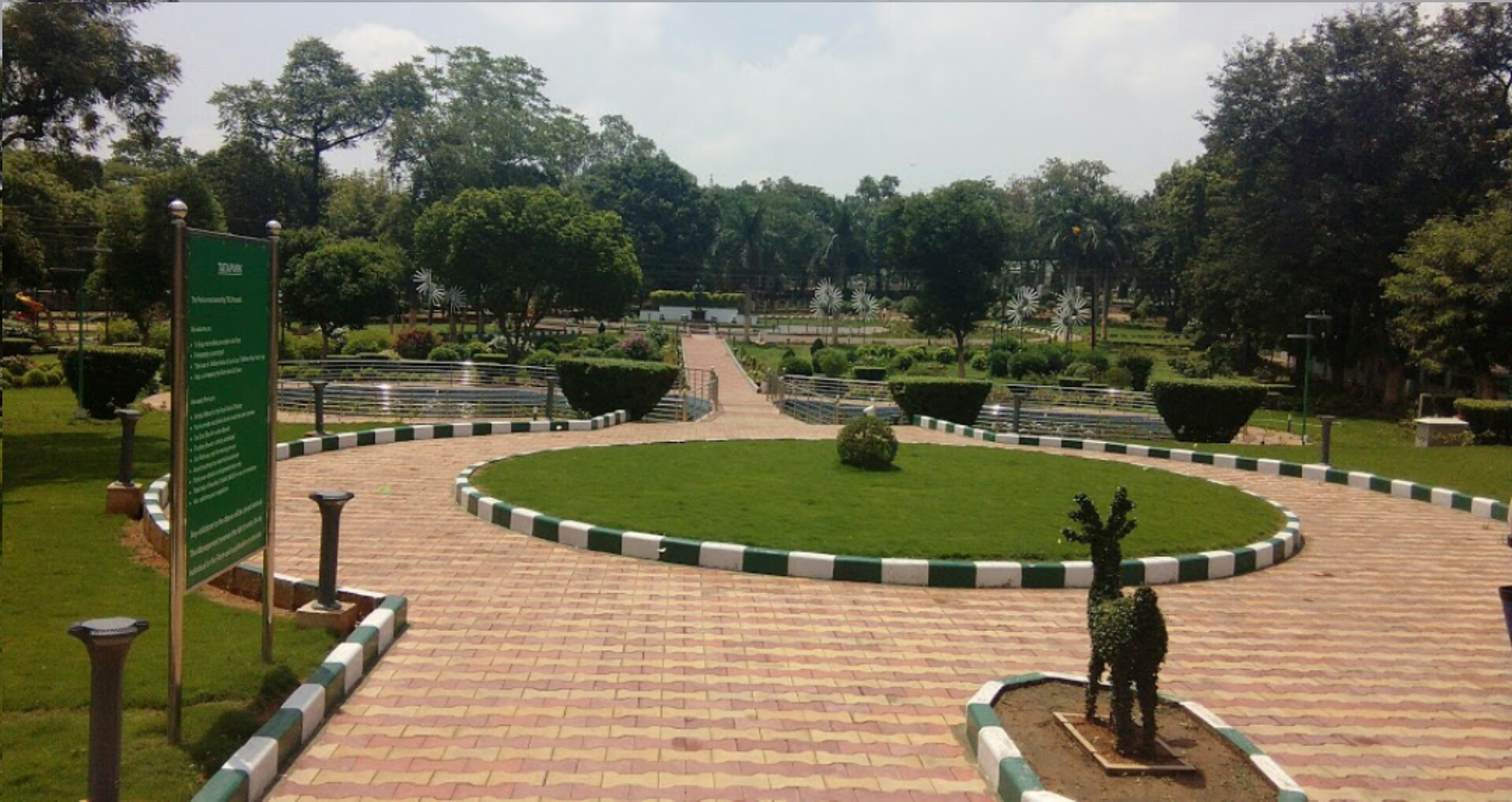
JRD Inside

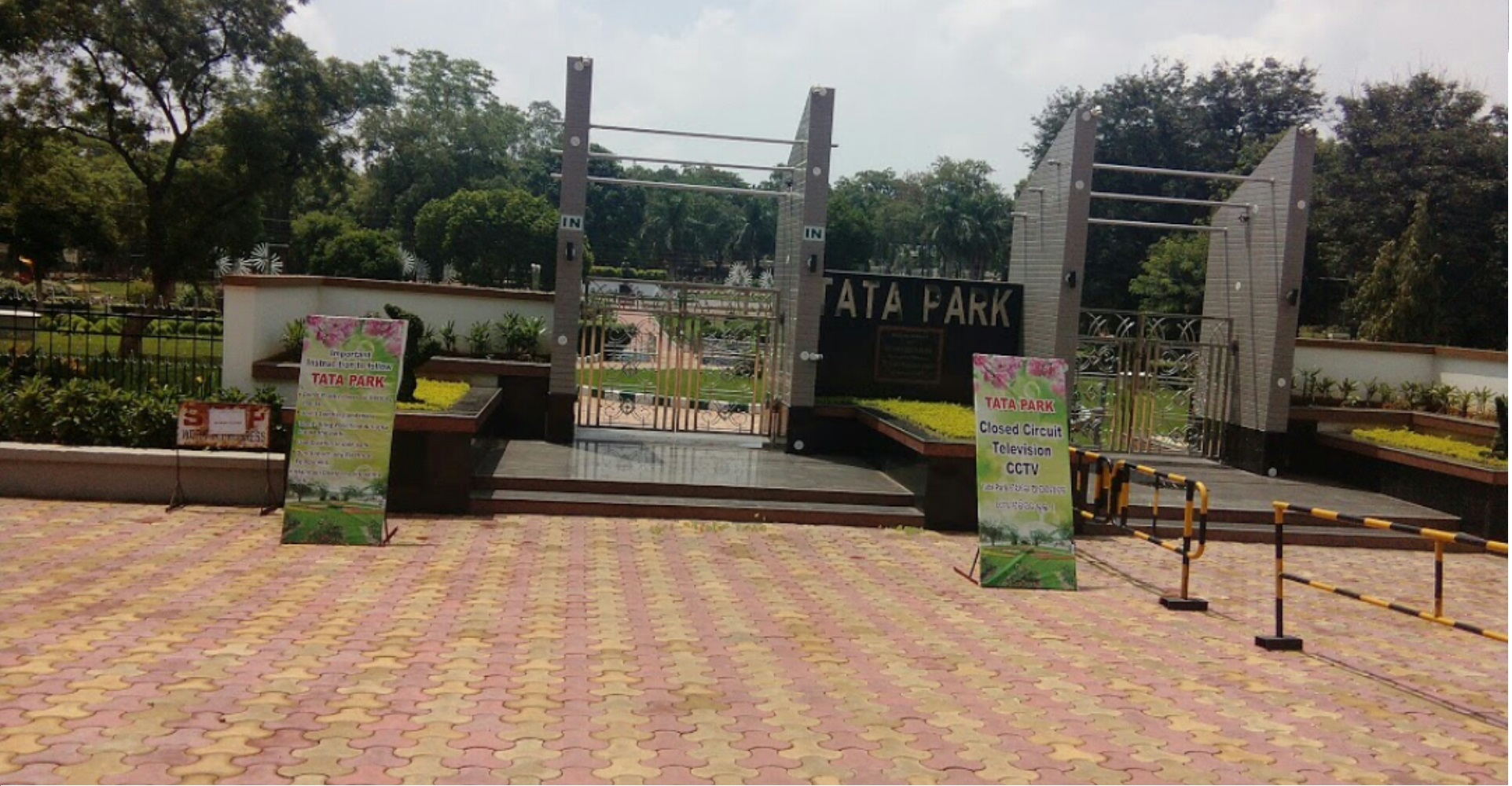
JRD Outside

== See also ==
- List of tourist attractions in Jamshedpur
- P&M Hi-Tech City Centre Mall
- Dalma Wildlife Sanctuary
- Rankini Temple, Jadugora
