= Rankini =

Tutelary guardian deity in eastern India

Rankini (Bengali: রঙ্কিনি) is a guardian deity, primarily worshipped in the eastern parts of India, including Jharkhand, West Bengal and Odisha. She is associated with protection, strength, fertility and prosperity.

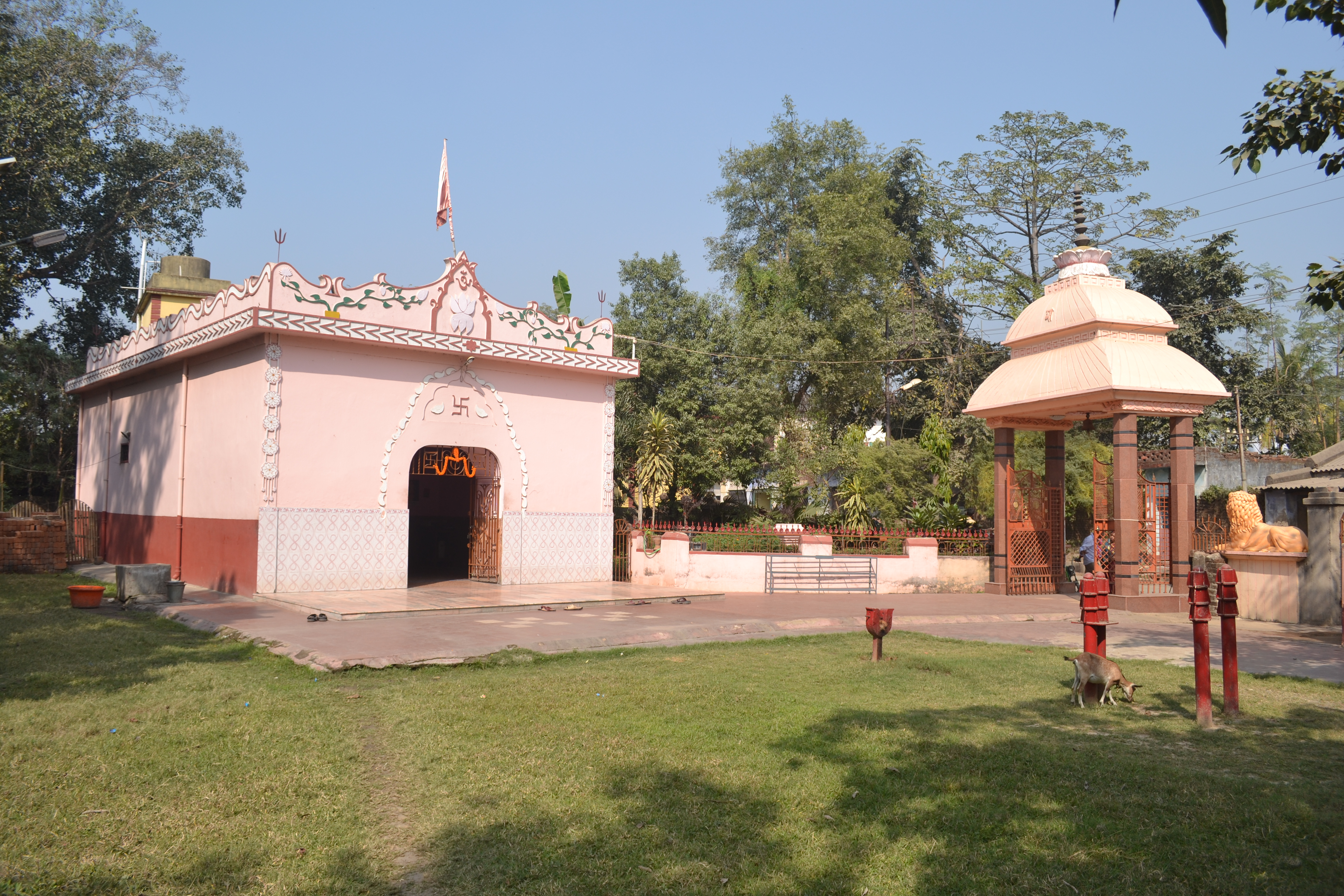
Adi Rankini Temple, Ghatshila

== Description ==
Rankini is a tribal demon goddess, revered by various tribal communities, especially the Bhumij tribe of eastern India. Her shrines are often found in remote jungles, reflecting her connection to nature and the wilderness. She is typically represented by a naturally occurring stone, which is believed to symbolize her presence.

Bibhutibhushan Bandopadhyay's "Rankini Debir Khadga" tells a chilling tale set in the village of Chero, Maanbhoom, where an abandoned temple to Rankini stands. The protagonist discovers that Rankini is actually a form of the goddess Kali, worshipped by the wild tribals who once lived in the region. Rankini, associated with barbaric practices like human sacrifices, is believed to bring death and famine when enraged. His discovery of a bloodied machete in his house triggers a series of disastrous events, including a cholera outbreak. Villagers fear Rankini as a harbinger of calamity. Ultimately, her wrath is misunderstood; she only warns of impending disaster.

She is also considered the family deity of the princely states of Dhalbhum and Jamboni. It is said that human sacrifice was offered to the goddess every year.
