= Dalma Wildlife Sanctuary =

Wildlife sanctuary in India

- IUCN category IV (habitat/species management area)
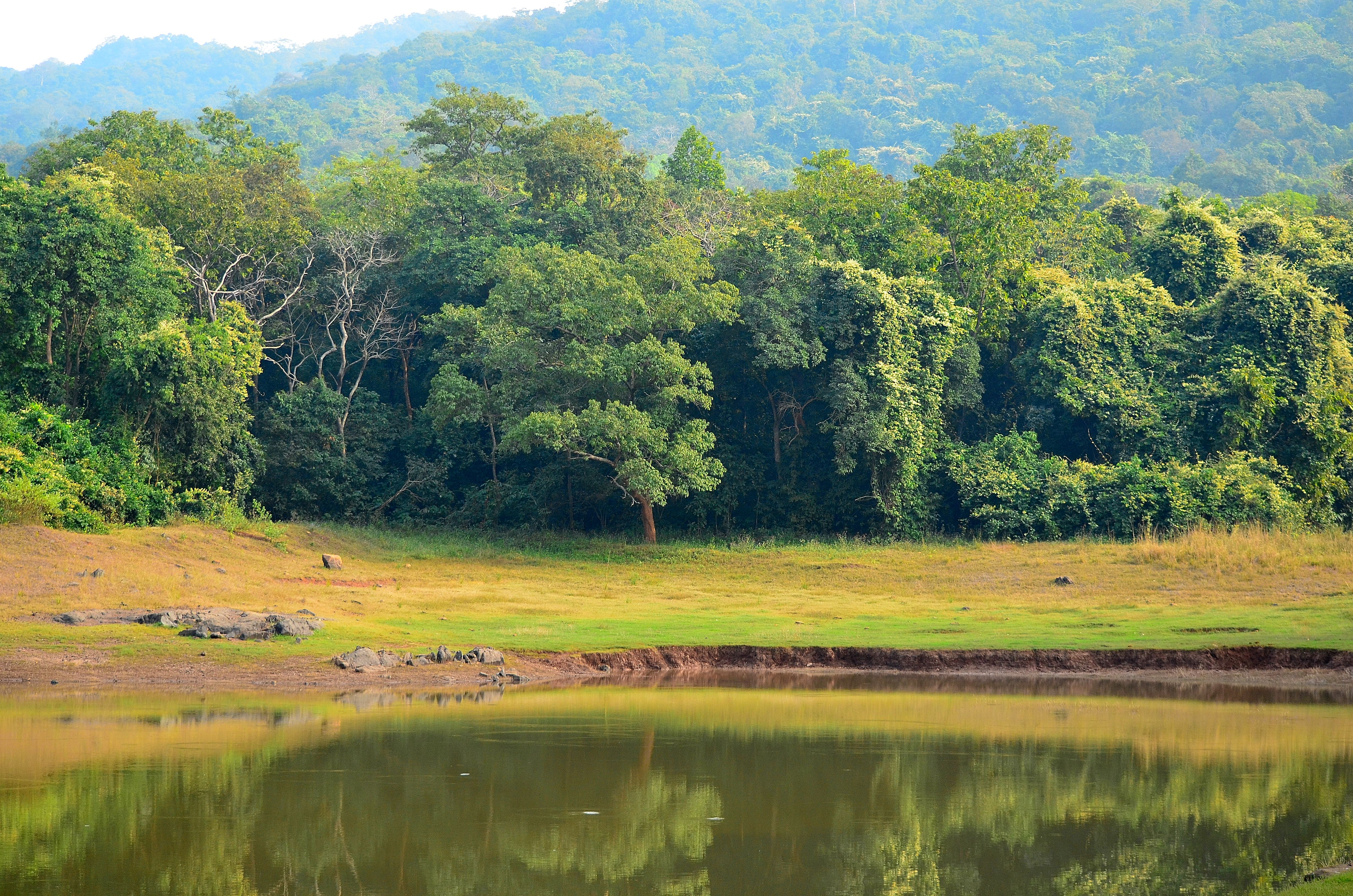
- Landscape in Dalma Wildlife Sanctuary

- Location within Jharkhand Location within India
- Interactive map of Dalma Wildlife Sanctuary
- Location: East Singhbhum, Saraikela Kharsawan district, Jharkhand, India
- Nearest city: Jamshedpur
- Coordinates: 22°54′15″N 86°12′59″E
- Area: 195 km^{2} (75 sq mi)
- Established: 1975
- Governing body: Department of Environment, Forest and Climate Change, Government of Jharkhand

Dalma Wildlife Sanctuary is a wildlife sanctuary in the Indian state of Jharkhand. It was inaugurated in 1975 and provides habitat for an Indian elephant population.

== Geography ==
Dalma Wildlife Sanctuary is situated in the Dalma Hills and covers around 195 km^{2} (75 sq mi) in East Singhbhum and Saraikela Kharsawan districts of the state of Jharkhand.

== Flora ==
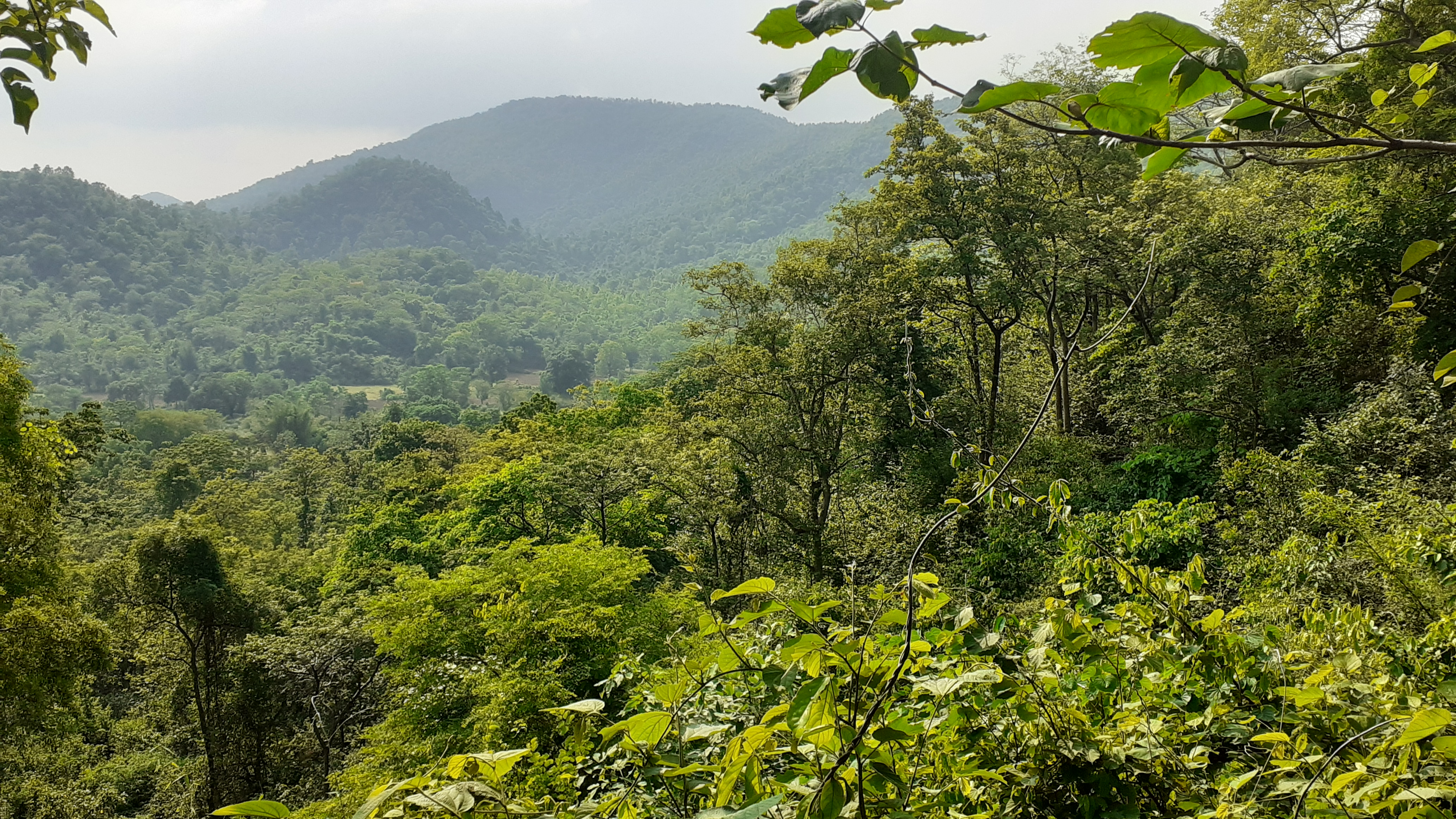
Forest in Dalma Wildlife Sanctuary

The forest consists of wide variety of trees including mango, guava, lemon, mahuwa, jamun, sheesham, neem, baabul, bamboo, arjuna, karanj, kadam and sal.

== Fauna ==
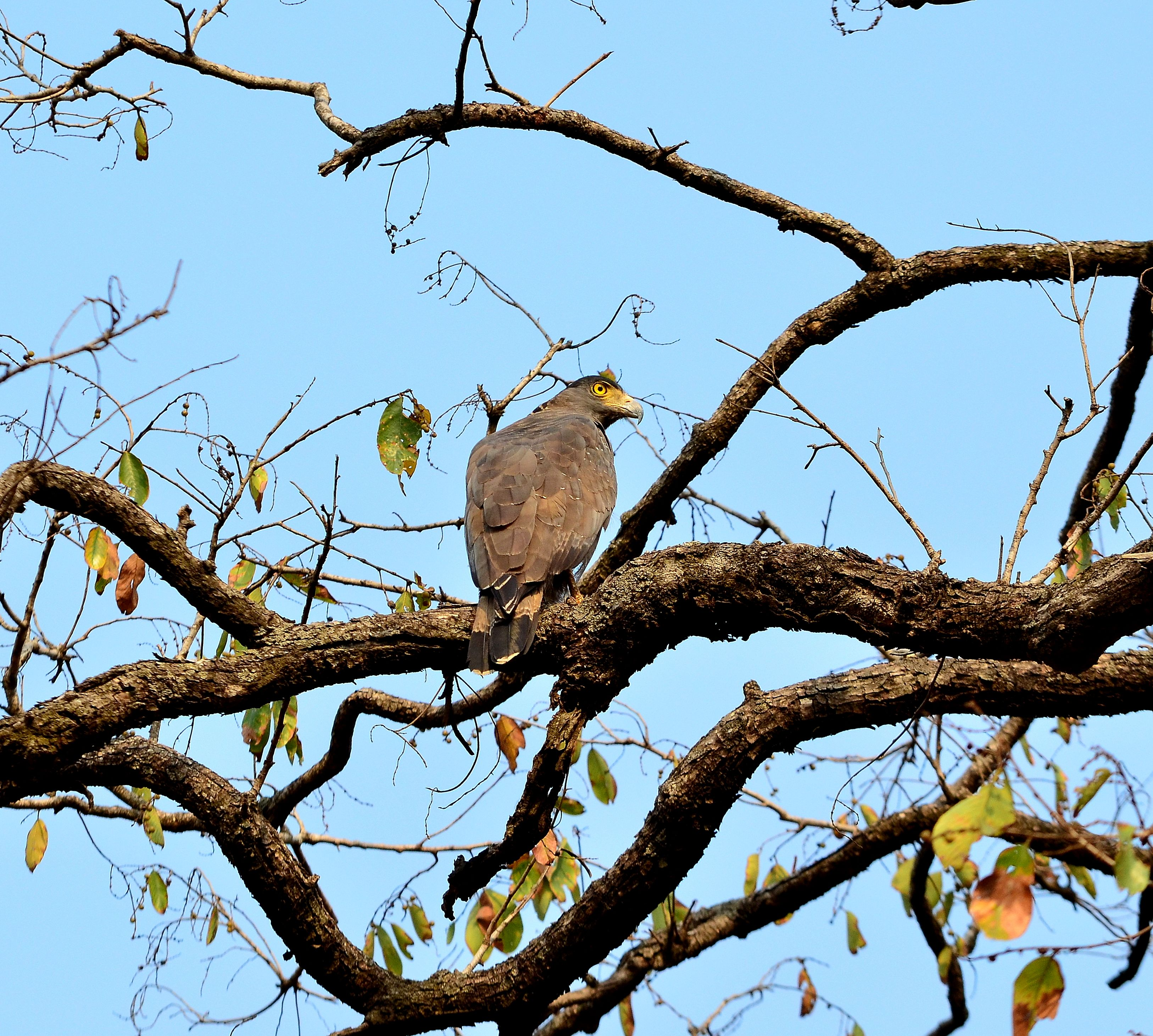
Crested serpent eagle at Dalma Wildlife Sanctuary

Dalma Wildlife Sanctuary is home to wide variety of wild animals. During a waterhole census in May 2022, Indian elephant, sloth bear, golden jackal, barking deer, wild boar, porcupine, mouse deer, langur, pangolin, Indian giant squirrel and mongooses were spotted. It hosts many species of birds including jungle fowl, Indian grey hornbill, Indian peafowl, kingfishers, common myna and Asian koel.

There are thought to be 85 elephants in the sanctuary as of 2024. They migrate to West Bengal during August and September and usually return in December and January.

In 2016, pugmarks of a tiger were found, and a tigress with a cub was videographed. In January 2025, a male tiger was in the sanctuary which migrated from Palamu Tiger Reserve through the forest corridor of Gumla and Khunti districts.
