= List of schools in Jharkhand =

Notable schools in the state of Jharkhand, India, include

- Baldwin Farm Area High School, Kadma, Jamshedpur
- Bishop Westcott Boys' School, Namkum, Ranchi
- Bishop Westcott Girls' School, Namkum, Ranchi
- Carmel Junior College, Sonari, Jamshedpur
- Carmel School, Giridih
- Carmel School, Madhupur, Deoghar
- Chinmaya Vidyalaya, Jamshedpur
- De Nobili School, CMRI, Dhanbad
- Jharia Gujarati Hindi High School, Jharia
- Jharia Raj High School, Bhagatdih
- Kairali School, Ranchi
- Loyola Collegiate School, Po-Telco, Jamshedpur
- Loyola School, Jamshedpur
- Netarhat Residential School, Netarhat
- Pitts Modern School, Gomia
- Ramakrishna Mission School, Sidhgora, Jamshedpur
- Ramakrishna Mission Vidyapith, Deoghar
- Sacred Heart Convent High School, Jamshedpur
- Sainik School, Tilaiya, Koderma
- St. Aloysius High School, Ranchi
- St. John's High School, Ranchi
- St.Thomas School, Dhurwa, Ranchi
- St. Xavier's School, Bokaro
- St. Xavier's School, Hazaribagh
- St. Xavier's School, Doranda, Ranchi
- Vikas Vidyalaya, Ranchi
