= Loyola Collegiate School, Jamshedpur =

Private catholic school in Jharkhand, India

Loyola School Telco, Jamshedpur

Location
- River View Area, Po-Telco, Jamshedpur, Jharkhand; India; 22°46′48″N 86°16′2″E

Information
- Type: Private primary and secondary school
- Religious affiliation: Catholicism
- Denomination: Jesuits
- Established: 2015; 11 years ago
- Administrator: Fr. Gerald Ravi DSouza, SJ
- Rector: Fr.Michael, SJ
- Principal: Mrs. Charanjeet Ohson
- Grades: K-12
- Age range: 4-18
- Medium of instruction: English
- Website: loyolatelco.com

Loyola School, Telco, Jamshedpur, is a private Catholic primary and secondary school located in Jamshedpur, in the state of Jharkhand, India. Founded by the Jesuits in 2015, the school provides education to students from kindergarten through standard 12, and receives no government aid.

== History ==
On 25 April 2013, the Loyola College of Education announced that it would start a college in Jamshedpur. It was stated that it would open on 1 April 2014. The school was constructed on the grounds of the Loyola College of Education. It was announced that the school would be affiliated with the Indian Certificate of Secondary Education and that funding for the school would come from the college of education and the Society of Jesus itself.

In 2022, the founder of the school, the Loyola College of Education closed. After the closure, some of the college's buildings were made available to the school and the school is run from Loyola School, Jamshedpur, a school which in November 2021 ranked 87th in the top 100 schools in India in the Education World India School Ranking 2021 to 2022 by Education World India.

== Overview ==
The governing board consists entirely of members of the Society of Jesus. The school is located on eleven point three nine acres (four point six one hectares) on what was the campus of the Loyola College of Education, Jamshedpur, and employed intern teachers from the college.

It is an English-medium school, and Hindi language is taught daily. Students are prepared for the ICSE (grade 10) and ISC (grade 12) Indian School Certificate Examinations.

== See also ==
- List of Jesuit schools
- List of schools in Jharkhand
- Violence against Christians in India
