= Sakchi =

- Neighbourhood of Jamshedpur
- Sakchi
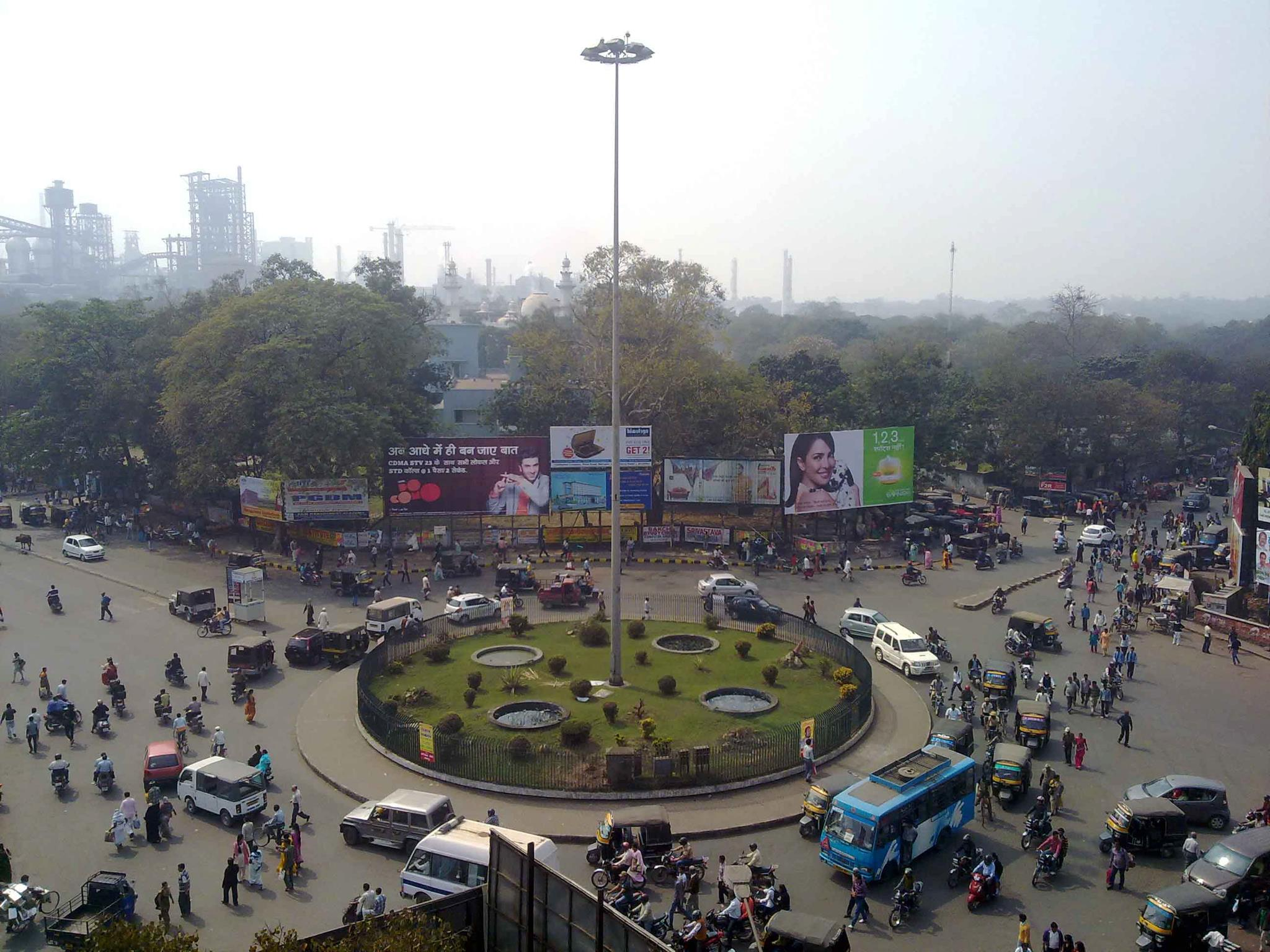
- Interactive map of Sakchi
- Coordinates: 22.805182°N 86.202282°E
- Country: India
- City: Jamshedpur
- State: Jharkhand
- Time zone: GMT + 0530
- Postal code: 831001

Sakchi is one of the oldest neighbourhoods in the city of Jamshedpur, Jharkhand, India. Situated in the heart of the city, it is surrounded by Bistupur to the west, Swarnarekha River to the north, Kalimati to the south and Bhalubasa to the east. The neighbourhood covers a very large area and is further divided into many neighbourhoods.

It was a village in north eastern Indian territory of Singhbhum which was selected by Jamsetji Tata to be the location of a planned steel city, which in 1919 became Jamshedpur. Sakchi is now part of the city between the Tata Steel site and the river Subarnarekha. Then it was known as Kalimati. Due to the presence of iron ore, river water and sand, Jamsetji Tata decided to establish TISCO (Tata Iron and Steel Company Limited) there. The company is now known as Tata Steel. Gradually, the neighborhood became more urbanized and new developments came, such as Jubilee Park, Tata Steel Zoological Park and Water Pumping Station. It has its own police station.

== History ==
=== Foundation ===
Jamshedpur
M: municipal town, F: facility, N: neighbourhood, W: works, factory, C: educational/ research centre
Owing to space constraints in the small map, the actual locations in a larger map may vary slightly
Places marked on this map, which have a separate page, are linked in the larger full scale map.
For map of Jamshedpur Urban Agglomeration see Mango or Adityapur page.

In April 1904, Dorabji Tata, Shapurji Saklatvala and C.M. Weld, went on a journey to locate a site rich in iron, coal, limestone and water. One day they reached to Sakchi village, situated in the dense forests of the Chota Nagpur Plateau, near the convergence of the Subarnarekha and Kharkai rivers. It appeared to be an ideal choice for a steel plant and the location was selected.

Sakchi was a tribal village, mainly inhabited by the Bhumij and Santhal tribes. Sakchi village was populated by 17 families of Bhumij, and its two hamlets – Kashidih consisted of 18 families of Bhumij and 3 families of Santhal; and Mahulbeda consisted of 17 families of Santhal.

The construction of the plant began in 1908, the plant rolled its first steel ingot on 16 February 1912. As Tata Steel was established, the first planned urban settlement started in Sakchi area and it included Gujarati, Parsi and Punjabi businessmen and servicemen, particularly Biharis, Bengalis, Oriyas, Telugus, Kannadigas, Marathis, Tamils, and Malayalis. In 1919, Lord Chelmsford renamed Sakchi to Jamshedpur in honour of its founder, Jamshedji Nusserwanji Tata.

=== Contemporary ===
Many people who then migrated from West Bengal, East Bengal (now Bangladesh), Gujarat and Assam are now permanent residents of Jamshedpur city and their ancestral homes were either lost or sold after the separation of East Pakistan (modern-day Bangladesh) during the 1971 war.

Once, there used to be a single line railway track which would carry sand for the factory in present-day Aambagan Maidan near the mosque, it does not exist anymore. Mode of transport in the Jamshedpur city were buggies and taxis. There were single lane roads with old British style street lamps. Most roads between Sakchi and Bistupur were surrounded by jungles.

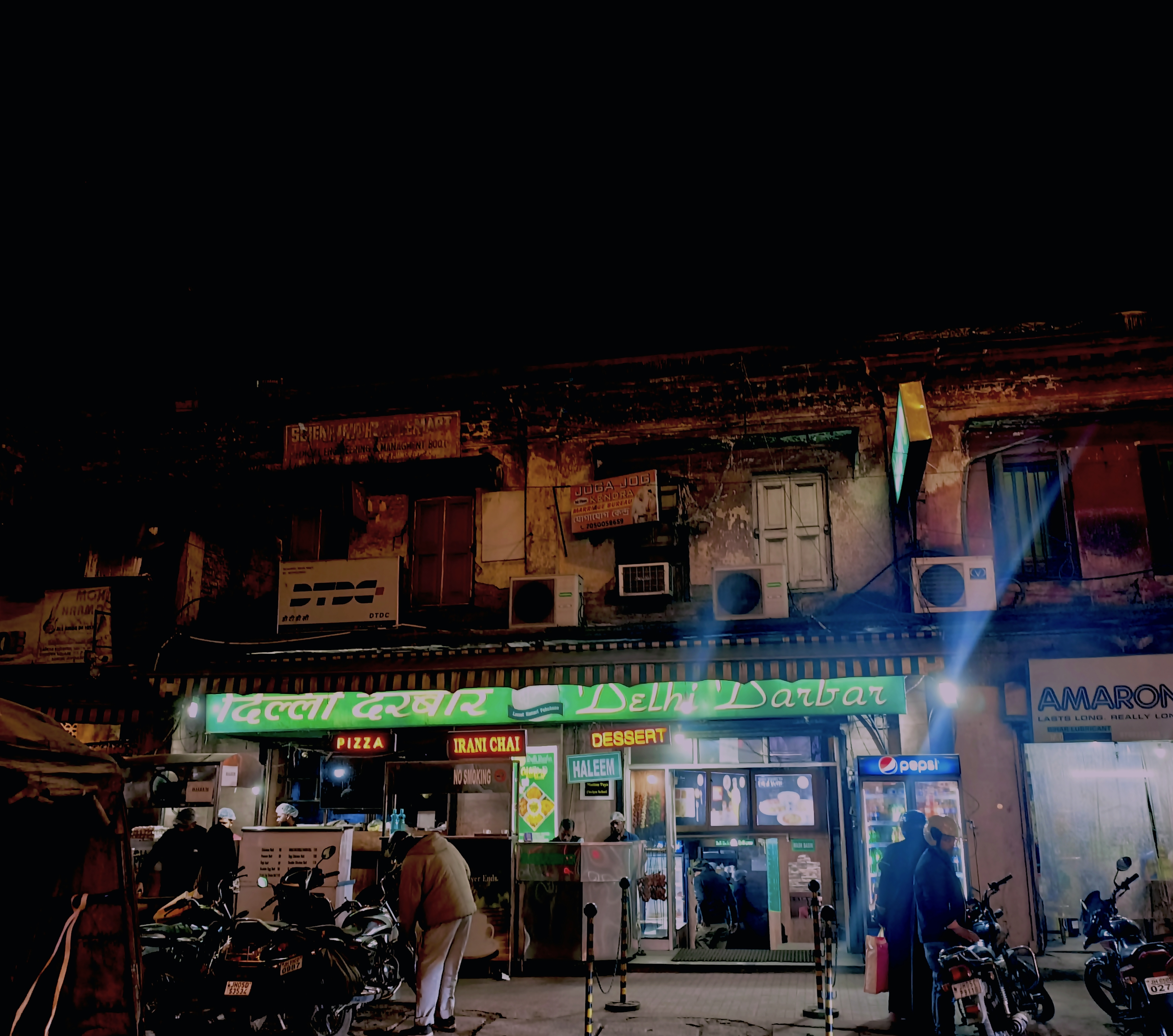
Delhi Darbar

Even today running through Sakchi is the Kalimati Road. During British India, a railway line connecting Jamshedpur to Howrah (Calcutta) was started. Jamshedpur is in the Indian mineral-rich state of Jharkhand which was earlier in South Bihar. Old houses of Bengalis, Parsis, Anglo-Indians and Gujaratis can still be seen in Aambagan, Hill Cart Road, Kalimati Road, Pennar road, Sakchi Bazar areas of Sakchi. A few such houses are also present in Bistupur.

The city is unique because it is a very small town even today with extreme ends being covered within 45 minutes (including traffic). It is not a metro city, yet it has the demography of a metro town as people from all ethnicities live here as permanent residents. Sakchi is located in the centre of the city, with Bistupur, Kadma, and Sonari lying in the West. In the East, lies Baradwari, Kasidih, Bhalubasa, Sitaramdera, Agrico and Sidhgora. In the North, lies Mango which is also one of the busiest locations of the city and down south lies Burmamines, Tatanagar station, Jugsalai and Parsudih.

Sakchi today has numerous cinema halls. Sakchi Market, also known as Sakchi Bazaar, is the oldest market in the city. It was used to hold Tuesday Market (Mangla Market) every Tuesday on footpath, till 2010. Today, a large number of modern development such as shopping malls and luxurious hotels, have taken place over the Straight Mile Road and Karim City College Road. Sakchi Golchakkar is one of the busiest intersections of the city.

== Landmarks ==
=== Points of interest ===
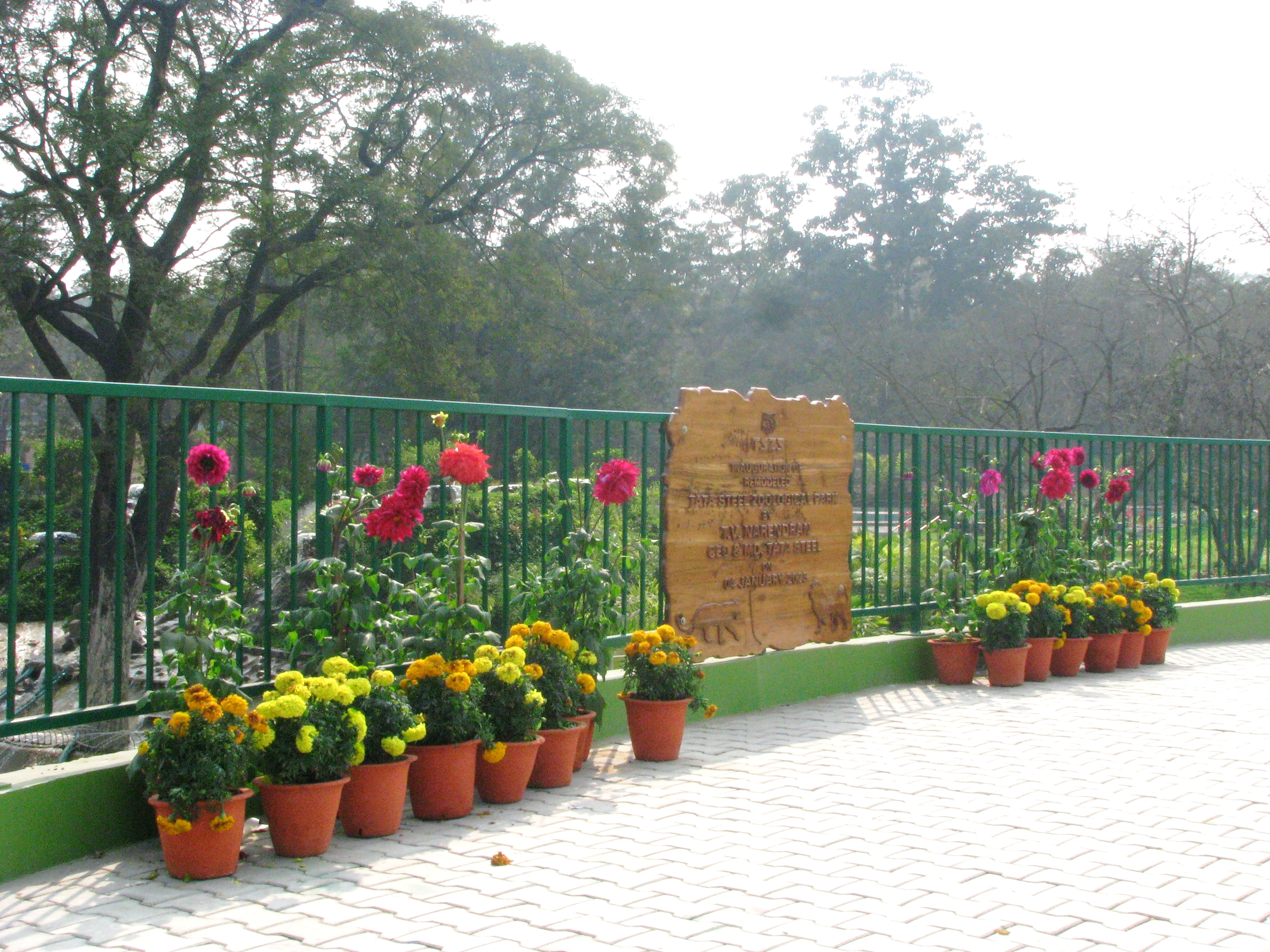
Tata Steel Zoological Park

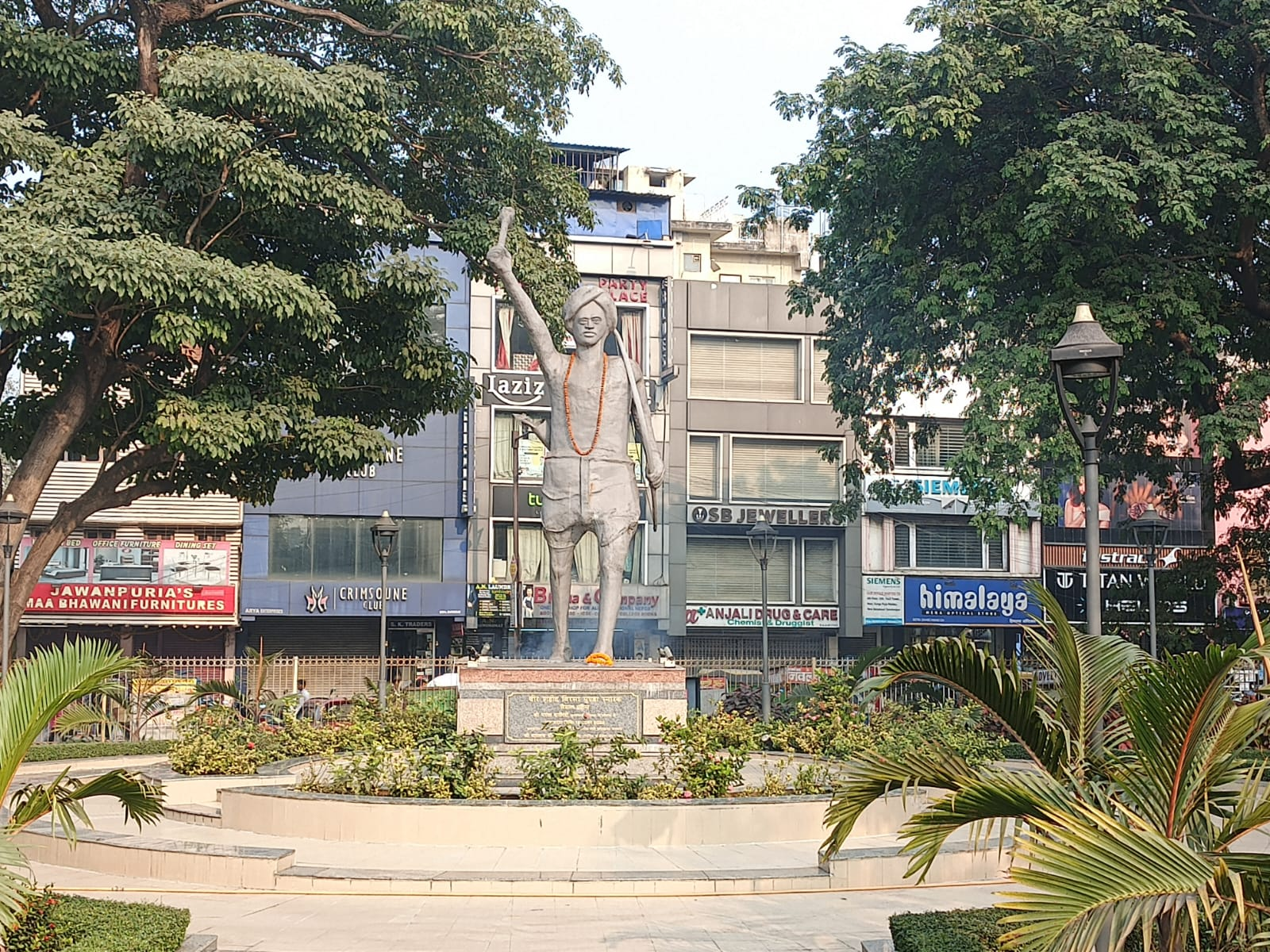
A statue of Birsa Munda in Sakchi

- Jubilee Park is the largest urban park of Jamshedpur. Built in 1950 as a gift by Tata Steel to the residents of Jamshedpur, the park was inaugurated by then prime minister Jawaharlal Nehru. With an area of 500 acres (2.0 km^{2}), it is one of the largest parks in the world. It consists of a lake called Jayanti Sarovar. The park features illuminated fountains, lush greenery, and flowering plants, and is a favorite spot for boating, fishing, and picnicking. There is a lake, that attracts migratory birds, especially during the winter, and has a small island inhabited by bats.
- Tata Steel Zoological Park is a zoo and sanctuary. Situated at the corner of the Jubilee Park, it is spread over an area of 43.25 hectares interspersed with wooded area and manicured lawns, gardens and lakes. It is specially known as the only zoo in India to have mandrills. The zoo also features African Lions, white tiger, Zebra, and butterfly park. It consists of Butterfly Park and Safari Park. There is an information center, that allows visitors to touch an ostrich eggshell or a deer antler. Recently, the park underwent massive renovation.

=== Establishments ===
- The Graduate School College for Women
- Karim City College is one of the oldest colleges in the state of Jharkhand. Established in 1961 Syed Tafazzul Karim and managed by Karim's Trust, it one of the oldest and premier colleges in the state. The college is permanently affiliated with Kolhan University and offers over 21 undergraduate and 7 postgraduate programs in Arts, Science, Commerce, and vocational subjects to over 5,000 students. The oldest campus is located in Sakchi, near the gate of Tata Steel. It also consists of various heritage buildings associated with the trust, such as Karim Talkies, Karim Mansion and Central Karimia School, many which have significance over 100 years ago.

=== Places of worship ===
- Thakurbari Radha Krishna Temple is one of the oldest Hindu temples in the city, built in 1904 by Pandit Hiralal and Pandit Madan Lal. It is located on Thakurbari Road in Aambagan. The temple is basically a multistoreyed building with a large open gateway from the main road.
- Sakchi Gurudwara is one of the largest Gurudwara in the city of Jamshedpur, located on New Kalimati Road in Sakchi near Kasidih. In the vicinity of gurudwara, consist of Hotel De Harmey, Guru Gobind School and a large ground for festive occasions. Tata Steel can be seen in background of the place while commuting between Sakchi, Kasidih and Golmuri. It houses Central Gurudwara Prabandhak Committee, that serves as the main community center for the city's Sikh population.
- Central Jama Masjid, also known as Sakchi Jama Masjid, is one of the largest mosques in Jamshedpur. It was built by Muslim employees of Tata Steel, thus making it as one of the oldest mosques in the city. Located beside Kannelite Hotel and Karim City College, it is easily accessible from Straight Mile Road and Sakchi Golchakkar, through Karim City College Road. The mosque is beautifully featured in Mughal architecture, with white color domes and minarets and markets in the vicinity. The imam of the mosque is the father of director Imtiaz Ali, who is himself alumni of DBMS English School.
- Aambagan Masjid is a large mosque located in Aambagan area of Sakchi. One of the oldest mosques in the city, its history dates back to 1911, when the Eidgah was established. Similar to Jama Masjid, a market is built in the vicinity of the mosque, known as Masjid Complex. There is also a large ground known as Aambagan Maidan, which is used for hosting events, most notably trade fairs and Islamic seminars, attracting various Islamic scholars across the world. A guesthouse is also attached to the mosque, known as Musaafir Khaana.
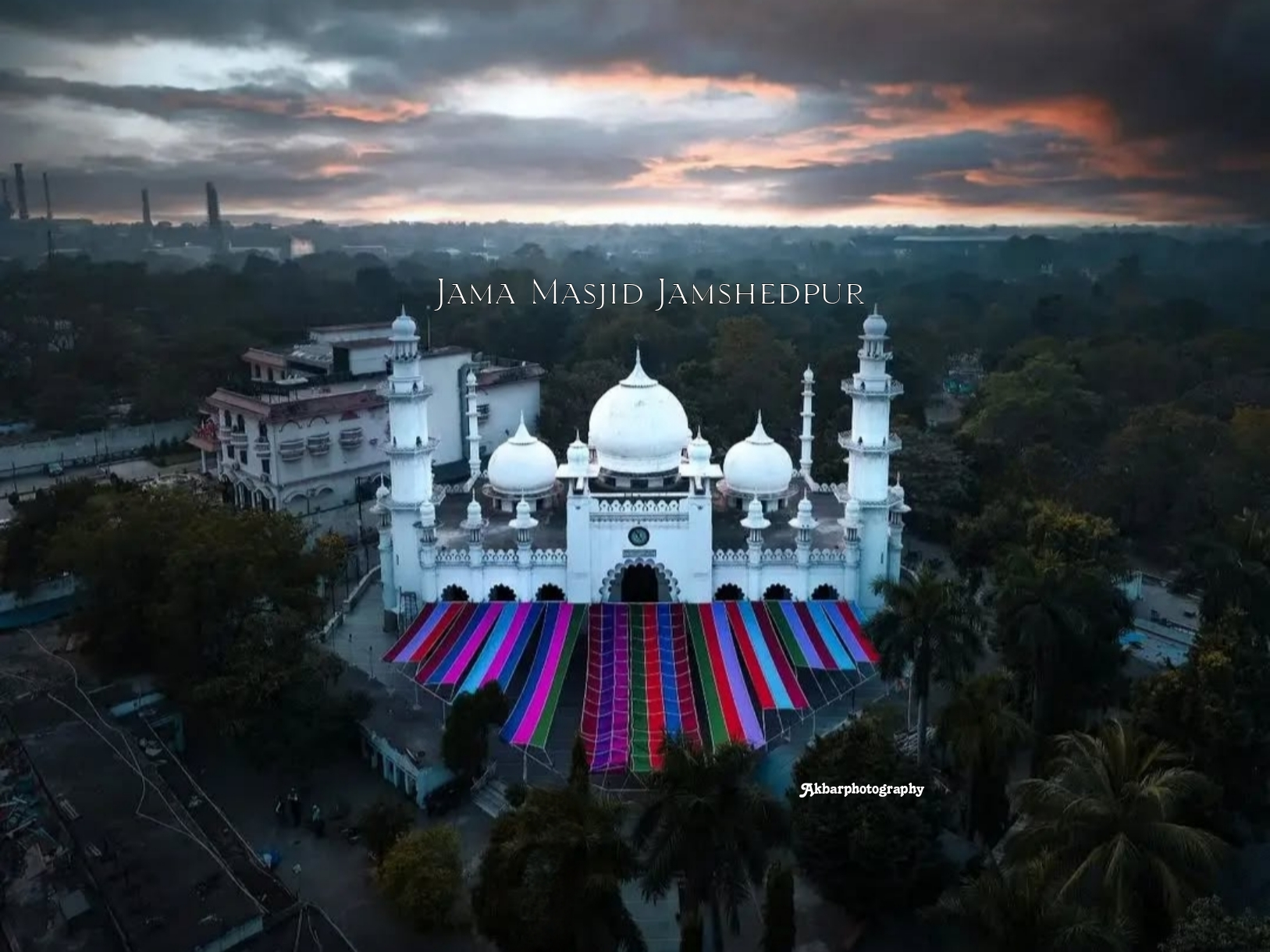
Central Jama Masjid

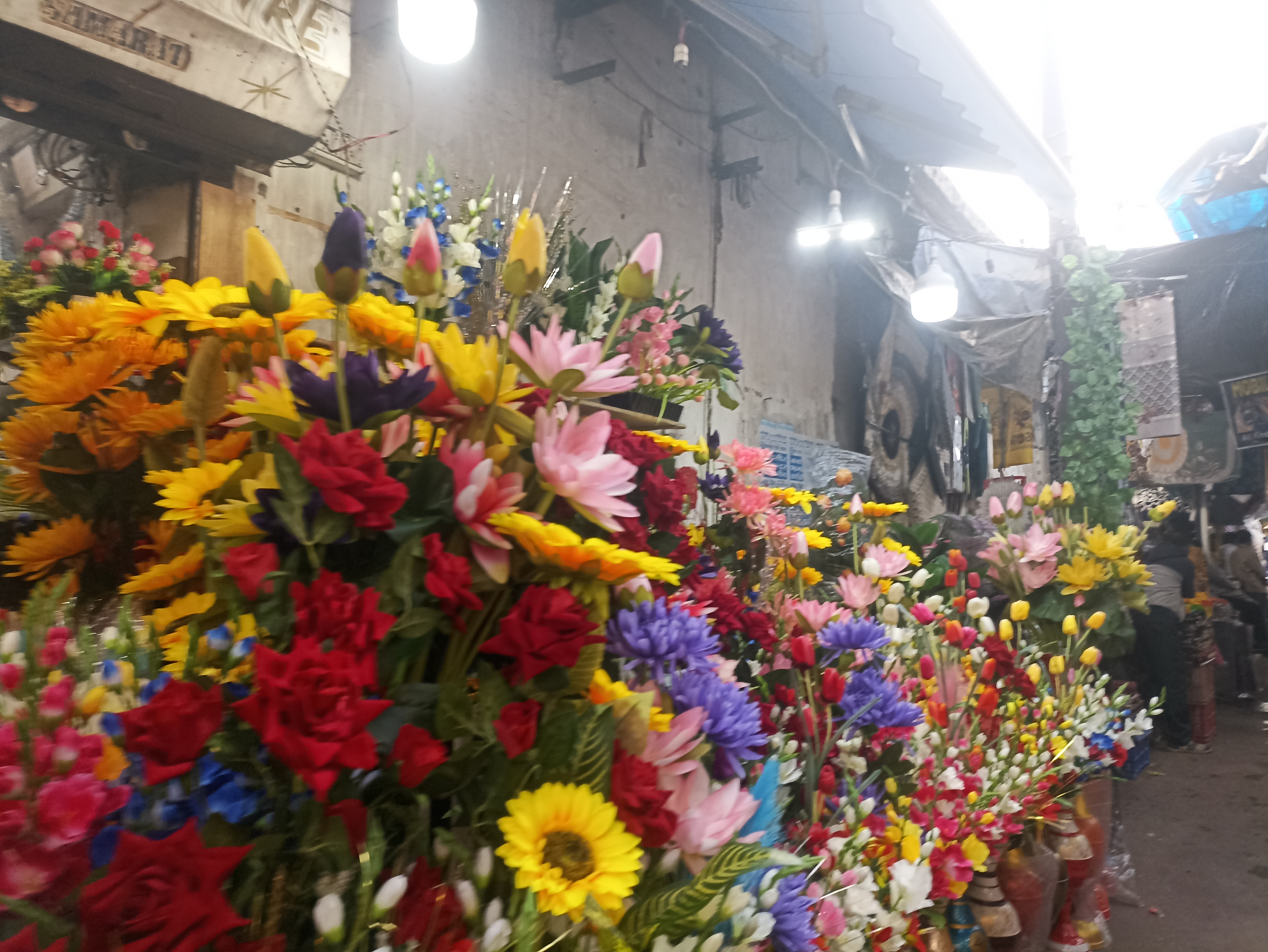
Inside Sakchi market

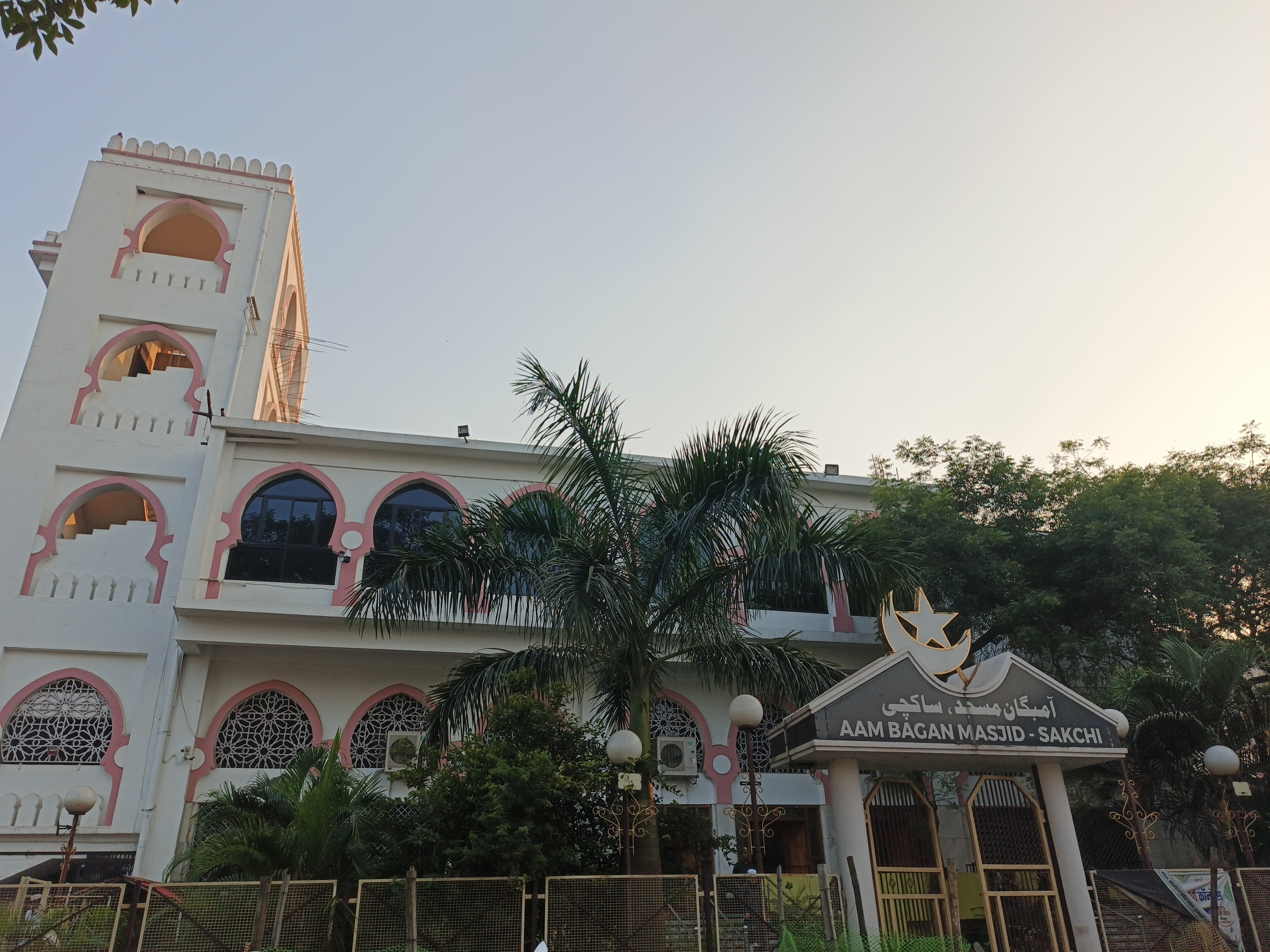
Aaambagan Masjid
