= De Nobili School =

De Nobili School may refer to several schools in India:

- De Nobili School CTPS, Bokaro
- De Nobili School, Maithon
- De Nobili School, CMRI
- De Nobili School, Bhuli
- De Nobili School, Sijua
- De Nobili School, Mugma
- De Nobili School, Sindri
- De Nobili School, FRI
- De Nobili School, Gomoh
