= St. John's High School, Ranchi =

St. John's School, Ranchi

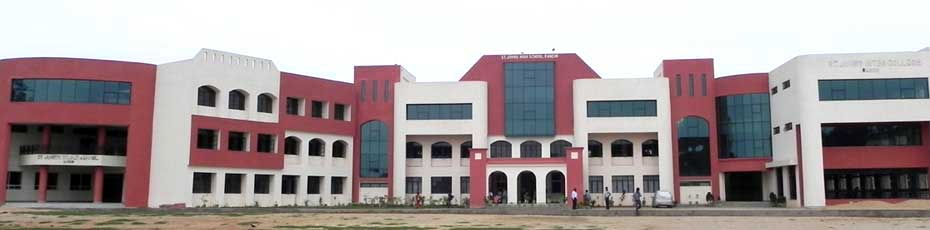

Location
- Purulia Road, Pathalkudwa, Nayatoli, Ranchi; Jharkhand, 834001; India
- Coordinates: 23°22′4″N 85°19′38″E

Information
- Type: Private secondary school
- Motto: Character building is superior to science and knowledge
- Religious affiliation: Catholicism
- Denomination: Jesuits
- Established: 1887; 139 years ago
- Sister school: St. Xavier's College, Ranchi
- Principal: Fr. Florence Kujur, S.J.
- Grades: 6–12
- Gender: Boys
- Campus: Urban
- Affiliation: Jharkhand School Examination Board
- Medium: Hindi

St. John's High School, Ranchi is a private Catholic secondary school for boys located in Purulia Road in Ranchi, Jharkhand, India. The school was founded by the Jesuits in 1887 and provides boys with an education from grades KG to 12.

== History ==
The origin of St. John's dates back to July 1869 when Fr. Stockman came to Chaibasa from Calcutta, ten years after two Belgian and one English Jesuit began the Bengal Mission. The Munda tribals (adivasis) of the area were being exploited by tax collectors, landlords, and the British colonizers, and it was not until 1885, with the arrival of Fr. Constant Lievens, that productive contacts were made between the adivasis of the Chotanagpur plateau and the Jesuit missionaries. St. John's was the first school founded by this mission, in 1887, and named the following year after Saint John Berchmans, a young Belgian Jesuit who had been canonised in Rome that year.

St. John's is one of the oldest schools in the entire region, and had a year-long celebration of its centenary in 1989-90 which was attended by the Chief Minister of the state and hundreds of alumni.

== Academics ==
The language of instruction is Hindi. The school is affiliated with the Jharkhand School Examination Board for class 10 examinations. It educates pupils from class 7 to class 10. Pupils of classes 1 to 6 are taught at St. John's Middle School, which is located on the same campus under the same administration.

St. John's High School has a sister school, St. Xavier's College, Ranchi, which is on an adjacent campus.

== See also ==
- List of Jesuit schools
- List of schools in Jharkhand
- Violence against Christians in India
