= Loyola School, Jamshedpur =

Private primary and secondary school in Jamshedpur, Jharkhand, India

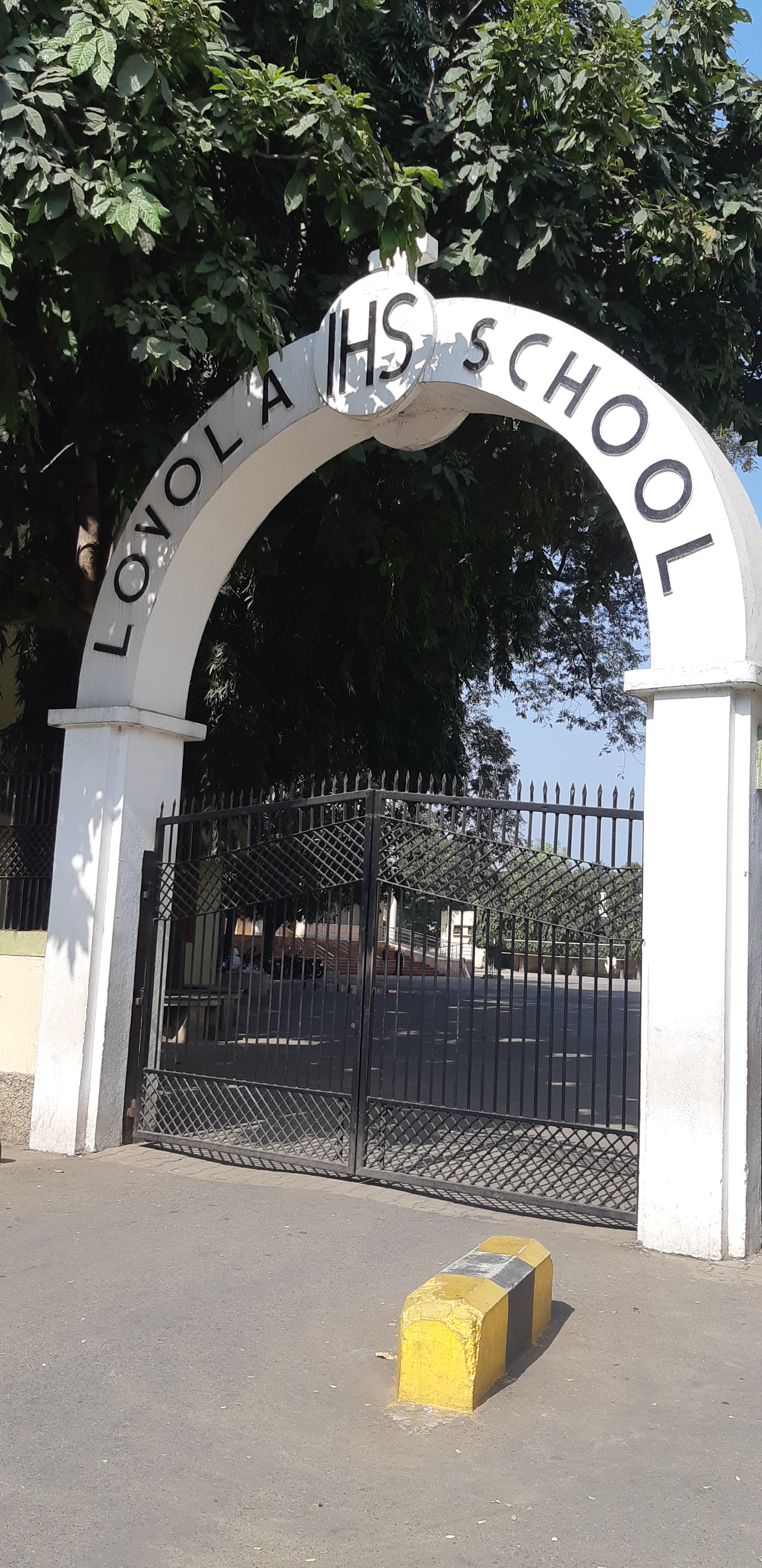
- Loyola School Jamshedpur

Location
- Jamshedpur, Jharkhand, 831001; India; 22°48′28″N 86°10′57″E

Information
- Type: Private primary and secondary school
- Motto: Latin: In Caritate et Justitia, Ad Majorem Dei Glorium (In charity and justice, for the greater glory of God)
- Religious affiliation: Catholicism
- Denomination: Jesuits
- Established: 1947; 79 years ago
- School district: East Singhbhum
- School code: JH05
- Rector: Father Michael, S.J.
- Principal: Father Vinod Fernandes, S.J.
- Faculty: ~120
- Grades: K-12
- Gender: Boys only (1947–2001); Boys And Girls (since 2001)
- Enrollment: ~3251
- Language: English
- Houses: Cheetahs; Leopards; Panthers; Jaguars
- Colours: Blue and gold
- Nickname: Loyoleans
- Affiliation: CISCE; ICSE
- Website: loyolajsr.com

Loyola School, Jamshedpur is a private Catholic primary and secondary school located in the Beldih Triangle of Jamshedpur, in the state of Jharkhand, India. Founded in 1947 by Jesuit missionaries from Baltimore, Maryland, in the United States, the school provides students with an education from kindergarten (KG) to 12th grade.

The school was a boys' only school with the exception of girls studying only in standards 11 and 12, and in 2001 it became co-educational from K-12.

The school consistently ranks as one of the best schools in India. In a 2021 survey conducted as part of the annual Education World India School Rankings (EWISR) by education newsmagazine, Education World India, Loyola School, Jamshedpur was ranked among the country’s top 100 schools. In the top 100 list, Loyola scored 87th rank.

== The school crest ==
The "chakra" or wheel on the left-hand corner is found in the center of India's Tri-colour and stands for progress. The symbol on the right is the logo of the Society of Jesus - which gives the universal trait of the Jesuits - being all things to all people. The symbol in the bottom left corner is a ladle from Tata Steel's blast furnace in Jamshedpur and signifies that the school is located in India's Steel City. The symbol in the right-hand corner of two wolves drinking out of a cauldron is taken from the coat of arms to be found in the Castle of Loyola, Spain, the birthplace of Ignatius of Loyola, the founder of the Jesuit Society. The Latin motto "In Caritat et Justitia" appearing on the ribbon underlining the base of the crest translates to "In charity and justice". The universal motto of the Society of Jesus is "Ad Majorem dei Glorium" meaning "For the greater glory of God".

== Fests, events, and news ==
In 2017 Loyola witnessed 'Azionare', a two-day fest as a joint effort of the Debating Club, Computer Club, Maths Club, GK Club, Physics, and Chemistry Club, Art & Craft club, Astronomy club, Entrepreneurship club & Entertainment club. More than 500 students from 17 schools of the city participated. The event saw a number of new subevents in the on stage as well as the offstage category. Events like Gauntlet, Sherlock in Space, Soap Carving also were new to the city. Quizzes like the Thomas Paul Science Quiz, Battle of Minds, and the Cyclotron were also held under the 'Azionare' banner. The annual was held in 2018 and 2019 as well. The Thomas Paul Science Quiz is an annual, inter-school event in memory of one of the former teacher of the school, Thomas Paul; Veritas, the former annual event of Debate Club was merged with Azionare. Helix (formerly, the Maths Fest) used to be an annual maths extravaganza conducted by the Maths Club.Etrix (formerly Abacus) used to be one of the biggest computer fests of the East India.

The Quiz Club of Loyola School is particularly active with a host of regular intra-school quizzes including, The Battle of Minds(2008), Battle of Neophytes, and the Bookworm Quiz. The Quiz Club used to be called the GK Club until late 2021. Battle of Aces and Jigyasa were introduced in the year 2021 for the alumni of Loyola School and the students of Loyola Hindi/Project School respectively. The Quiz Club introduced a competitive league called Loyola Quiz League in 2021 which is divided into four seasons and spans over a period of twelve months. The Club drafted its own Constitution for a smooth functioning and enforced it on the Republic Day of 2022. The Quiz Club of the school has brought a number of National and International accolades to the school as well.

The school also plays host to entertainment events. Rhapsody is the annual extravaganza organised by the JYOTI unit of Loyola School. Tamanna, a showpiece event, was held in the XLRI Auditorium for three consecutive years, as a platform for singers, dancers, and performers in the school. In 2011 it was organised in the Assembly Ground (within the school premises itself), and included an audience of underprivileged, as well as handicapped children, from the local charitable organisations.

The school has undergone major upgrades such as a new computer lab for the junior school, and an upgraded chemistry lab. The former Jesuit hostel has been turned into a staff room for the teachers. A new library named Knowledge Centre has been constructed. Examination Centres has been constructed in on the 3rd and 4th floors of the Knowledge Centre. The handball court, basketball court and CNR Ground has been renovated. The Senior School Computer Lab and the Physics Lab have been updated.

== The Loyolean ==
"The Loyolean", first published in 1992, is the official magazine of Loyola School, Jamshedpur. It started due to the interest shown by the students of XII Commerce 1993 batch who were supported by the then principal Father Eric Cassel and Mrs Leela Ghose, and is the successor to an earlier newspaper called "Jai Loyola" which was discontinued in the 1980s and is considered to be the oldest school newspaper in Eastern India.

An original hand-drawn logo of The Loyolean still remains in the Loyola Press Club room. It is believed to have been drawn by Father Cassel himself.

== Uniform ==
- Kindergarten to 5 (girls): white short sleeved blouse. Khaki checkered tunic black shoes and black socks.
- Kindergarten to 5 (boys): white shirt, khaki short pants, black shoes with lace and black socks.
- 6 to 10 (girls): white half sleeve shirt, with a checkered tunic, black shoes, and navy blue socks.
- 6 to 10 (boys): white half sleeve shirt, khaki full pants, black shoes with lace and navy blue socks.
- Plus 2 (girls): light blue half sleeve shirt, dark grey tunic, black shoes, and white socks.
- Plus 2 (boys): light blue half sleeve shirt, dark grey full pants, black shoes with lace and white socks.

All uniforms have a monogram according to house colour.

== Notable alumni ==
Students, staff, and alumni of Loyola School, Jamshedpur, are known as Loyoleans.

- Shar Dubey, CEO of Match Group
- Ananth Raman, Professor and Economist at Harvard Business School
- Shiv Visvanathan, noted author and academician
- Adarsh Gourav, actor
- Varun Aaron, cricketer
- Mahesh Aney, cinematographer
- Rajdeep Chatterjee, singer
- Astad Deboo, modernist dancer
- Rajit Gadh, professor of mechanical and aerospace engineering, University of California, Los Angeles
- Neeraj Kabi, actor
- Sanjivan Lal, film director
- Shilpa Rao, singer

== See also ==
- List of Jesuit schools
- List of schools in Jharkhand
- Violence against Christians in India
