= Baldwin Farm Area High School =

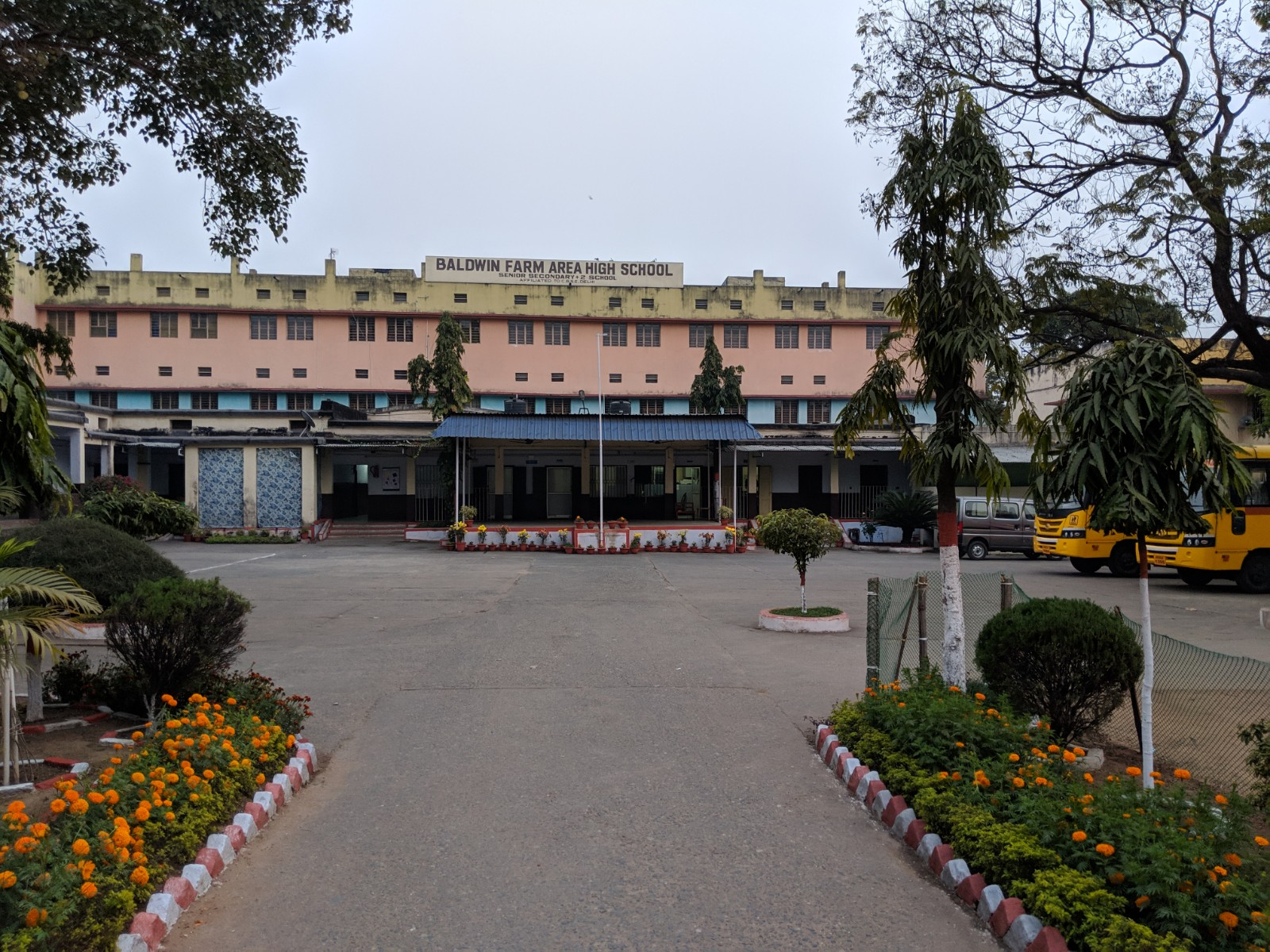
- Building

Location
- Kadma Jamshedpur; Jharkhand, 831005; India
- Coordinates: 22.804°N 86.161°E

Information
- School type: Senior secondary
- Motto: Deeds Not Words
- Established: 2003
- School board: CBSE
- Session: April–March
- Principal: Subhoshree Sarkar
- Gender: Boys and girls
- Classes: Nursery to 12
- Language: English
- Campus size: 2 acres
- Affiliation: CBSE, New Delhi
- Website: www.baldwinsociety.in

Baldwin Farm Area High School, formerly known as Farm Area Primary School, is a senior secondary, co-educational, English medium school located in Kadma, Jamshedpur, Jharkhand, India. It is affiliated to the Central Board of Secondary Education, New Delhi, and managed by Baldwin Academy Society. The school was established by Tata Steel (known as TISCO at the time) and outsourced to Baldwin Academy Society, Patna in 2003. The principal of the school is Subhoshree Sarkar.

== Administration ==
- Principal - Dr. Subhoshree Sarkar
