= St. Xavier's School (Bokaro) =

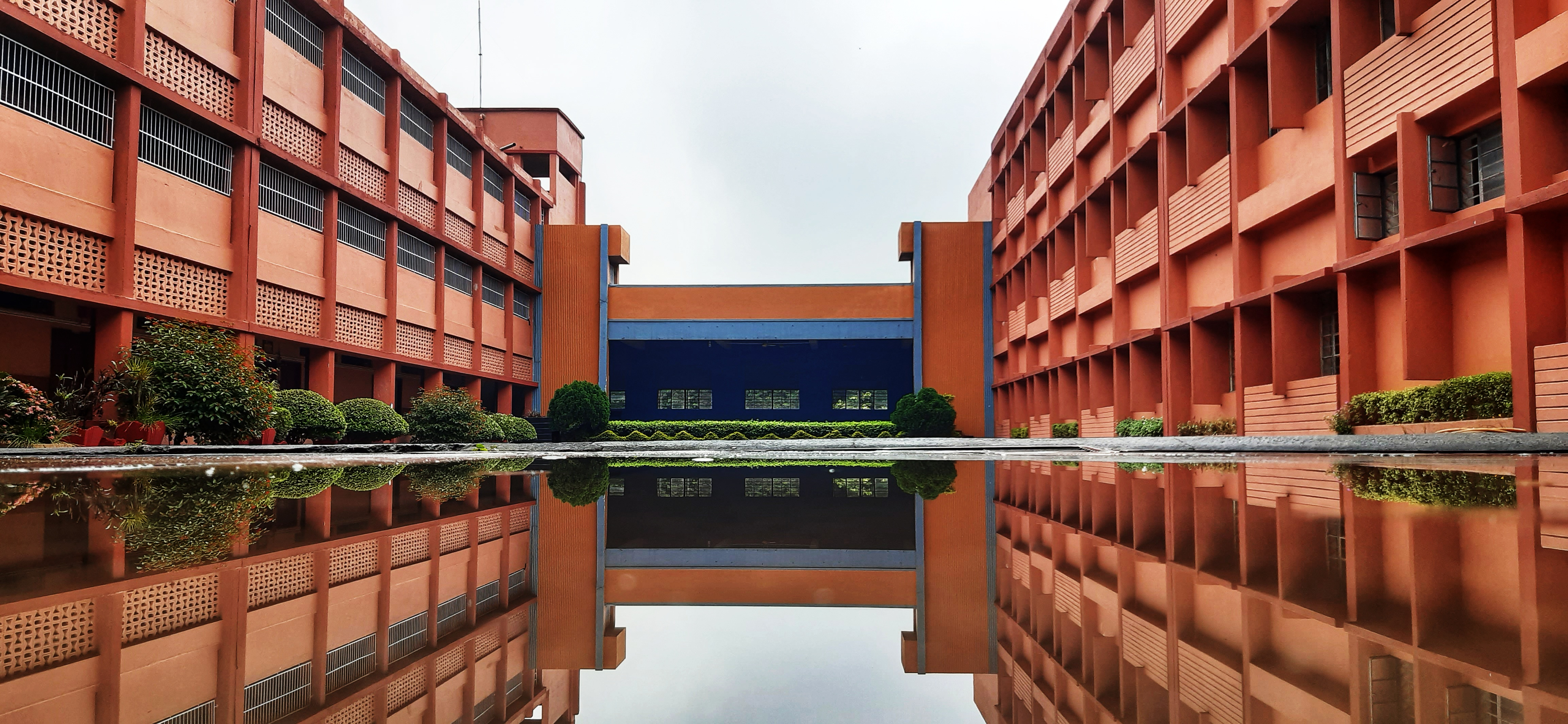

Location
- Bokaro, Jharkhand; India; 23°39′35.27″N 86°9′46.04″E

Information
- Type: Private primary and secondary school; Christian minority school
- Motto: रुपांतरीकरणीयम्
- Religious affiliation: Catholicism
- Denomination: Jesuits
- Established: 18 July 1966; 60 years ago
- Principal: Fr. Arun Minj, SJ
- Grades: K-12
- Enrollment: more than 3000
- Language: English-medium
- Affiliation: Council for the Indian School Certificate Examinations (CISCE)
- Alumni: Old Xaverians
- Website: www.xaviersbokaro.com
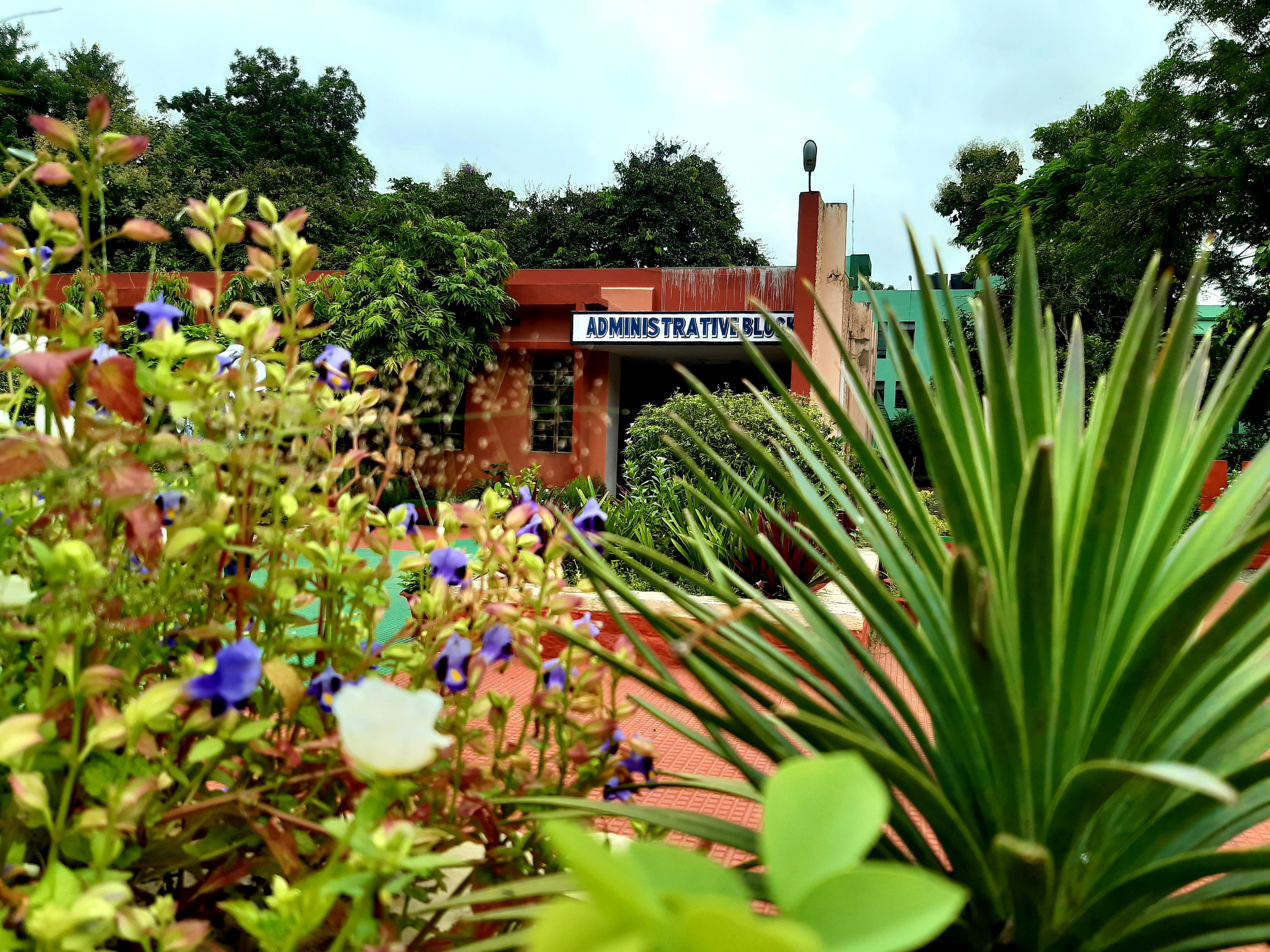

St. Xavier's School is a private Catholic secondary school located in Bokaro Steel City, Jharkhand, India. The Christian minority school was founded by the Jesuits in 1966 primarily to serve the children of those working at Bokaro Steel Plant. It is the oldest private school in Bokaro and the only ICSE school in the main township of Bokaro.

== Overview ==
The plant felt the necessity of a school in Bokaro Steel City where the children of their employees could be taught up to the higher secondary or its equivalent stage through the medium of English, and so invited Xaviers Hazaribagh Association to undertake the opening and running of such a school. The school opened on 18 July 1966.

The house system is followed and Loyola, Carmel, Loreto, and Xavier houses compete against each other each December. Co-curricular activities include: Integrity Club (promotes integrity in society), Peace Club (promotes peace and harmony), Spectrum Club (promotes spoken English), Science Club, Interact Club (provides service opportunities), Sports Club (develops game skills), Eco Club (sponsors ecological activities), Finomics Club (enhances student knowledge of economics and finance), I.T. Club (deals with modern tech and cyber crimes), Xavier Online (creative writing quarterly), Social Service League (encourages outreach).

The school undertakes various charitable activities through its Social Service League. It prepares students for the Indian Certificate of Secondary Education (ICSE), and Indian School Certificate (ISC) exams. It has served as the venue for regional speech contests.

Xavier's celebrated its Golden Jubilee in December, 2016 wherein it sought participation and contribution from its students who are present round the globe. There is a strong bond amongst its alumni in form of BOXA (Bokaro Old Xaverian Associations).

== Principals ==
The following individuals have served as principal of the school:

Ordinal	Officeholder	Term start	Term end	Time in office	Notes
1	Fr. John Moore, SJ (founder)	1966	1980	13–14 years	
2	Fr. Ken McNamara, SJ	1980	1990	9–10 years	
3	Fr. P. O. Chacko, SJ	1990	1997	6–7 years	
4	Fr. Geoff Meagher, SJ	1997	2005	7–8 years	
5	Fr. Francis Kurien, SJ	2005	2010	4–5 years	
6	Fr. Pradeep Shail, SJ	2010	2016	5–6 years	
7	Fr. Saju Bastian, SJ	2016	2019	2–3 years	
8	Fr. Dr. P.J. James, SJ	2019	2022	2–3 years	
9	Fr. Arun Minj, SJ	2022	incumbent	3–4 years	

== Notable alumni ==
- Arundhati Bhattacharya— Retired Indian banker, former Chairman of the State Bank of India (SBI).

- Awanish Kumar Awasthi— 1980 batch. Retired IAS officer, 1987 batch, UP cadre. Former Additional Chief Secretary and current Advisor to the UP Chief Minister.

- Amit Kumar Dhawan— CEO at PT Unza Vitalis, Wipro Consumer Care.

- Anil Palta— 1984 batch. Indian Police Service (IPS) officer.

- Manish Erry - 1985 batch, General, Indian Army. Presidential award winner

- Mukesh Kumar Singh— Indian Police Service (IPS) officer.

- Aditya Kumar Wahi— Commander in the Indian Air Force.

- Kaveri Priyam— 2008 batch. Indian TV actress.

- Shishir Parkhie— 1986 - Ghazal singer, composer, and live performer.

- Sanjeev Mohanty— MD & CEO, Levi's Strauss

- Ravi Narayanan— 1987 batch. MD and CEO, SMFG India.

== See also ==
- List of Jesuit schools
- List of schools in Jharkhand
- Violence against Christians in India
