= P&M Hi-Tech City Centre Mall =

Shopping mall in Jamshedpur, India

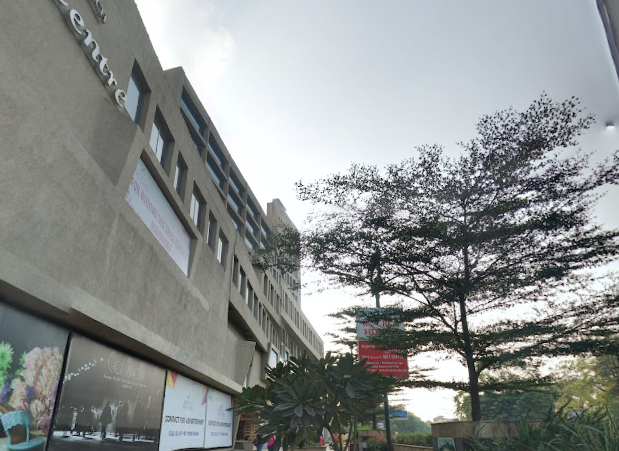
- Location: Jamshedpur, Jharkhand, India
- Coordinates: 22.784906°N 86.179873°E
- Address: Outer Circle Road, Bistupur, Jamshedpur
- Opened: September 2017 (Already opened)
- Developer: Prakash Jha, R.K.Aggarwal
- Owner: P&M Group and Hi-Tech Group
- Architect: Sanjay Puri
- Num. of stores: 160
- Num. of anchor tenants: 3
- Floor area: 600,000 square feet (56,000 m^{2})
- Floors: 8
- Parking: 500 cars
- Website: www.citycentretatanagar.in

P&M Hi-Tech City Centre Mall is located in the city of Jamshedpur, Jharkhand. It has a gross lease-able (retail) area of 600,000 sq ft (56,000 m^{2}). Film director Prakash Jha and R.K. Aggarwal are the builders of the mall. It is located at Outer Circle Road, Bistupur. It is the second branch of P&M mall, Patna.

== Shops and retail ==
List of Shops
Name	Shop No.
KFC	
Burger King	
McDonald's	Ground Floor
Domino's Pizza	
Chat Street	
Chinese Delight	
Blackberrys	Ground Floor
Pantaloons	
Smart Bazaar	
Jack & Jones / Vero Moda / Only / Selected / J&J Junior	Ground Floor
Cinepolis (6 Screen 1200 Seats)	
Hush Puppies	
Woodland	
Louise Philipe	
Sky 180°	Roof Top
Hoffmen	
WOODLAND	
Pepe Jeans London	1st Floor, Shop no. 18
Live In Levi's®	
Westside	
W	Ground Floor
Pizza Hut	RT 11
Wishful	Ground Floor
House of fear	
MINISO	
SMAASH-GAMING ZONE	Top Floor
Being Human Clothings	
Karim's	
Fat Tiger	
Utsav multicuisine Restaurant	
Yummerica Fries	
MBA Chai Wala	
Royal Perfume	1st Floor

== Gallery ==
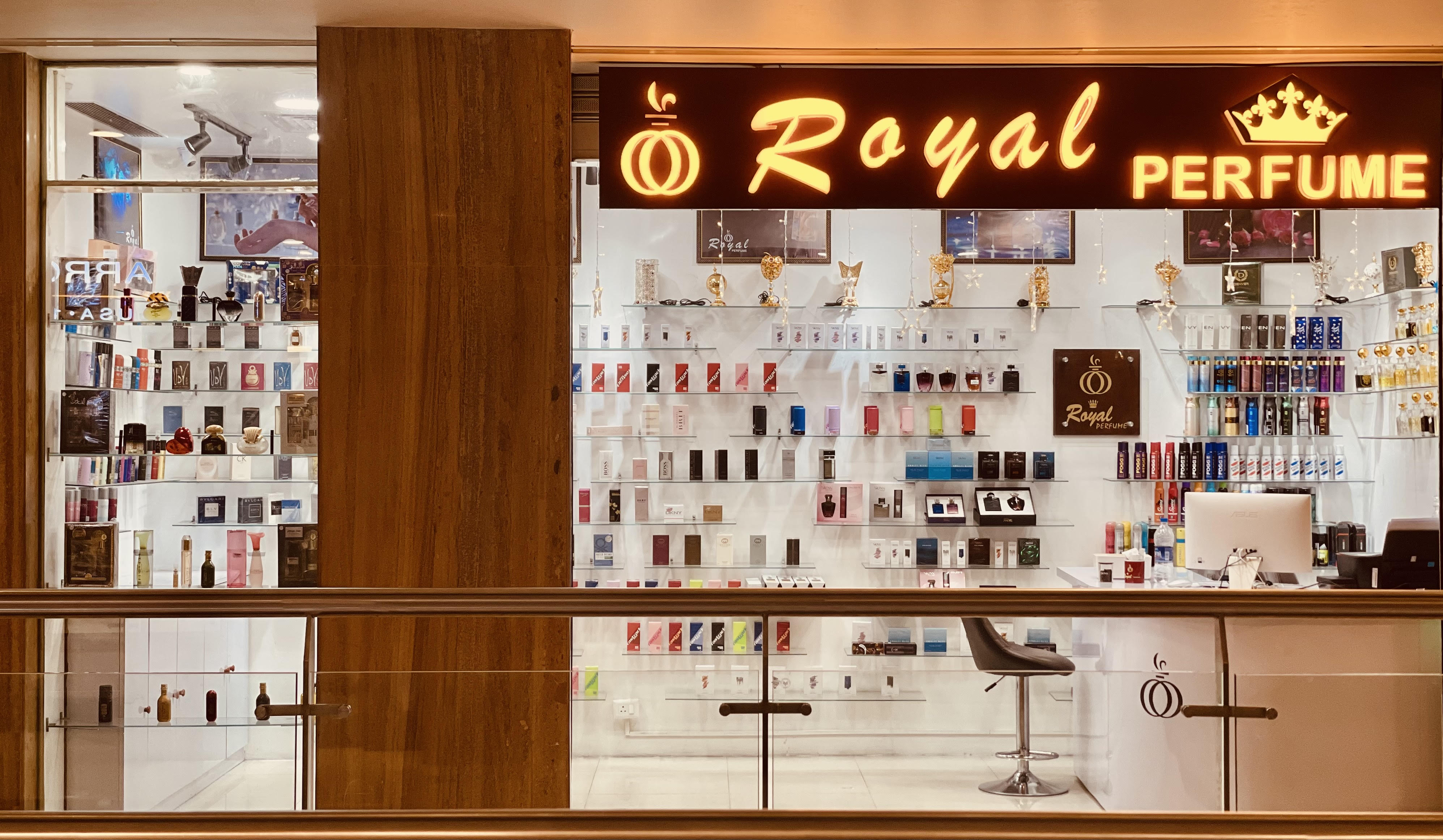
Royal Perfume Store in mall

== See also ==
- List of tourist attractions in Jamshedpur
