= Loyola College of Education, Jamshedpur =

Educational Institute

Coordinates: 22°46′51.07″N 86°16′3.97″E

- Type: Private Roman Catholic Christian minority Coeducational Self financed Higher education institution
- Established: 1976; 50 years ago
- Founders: Fr. Kenneth Judge, SJ
- Religious affiliation: Roman Catholic (Jesuit)
- Academic affiliations: Kolhan University
- Principal: Fr. P. Anthony Raj, SJ
- Faculty: 14
- Administrative staff: 11
- Students: 100
- Location: Telco, Jamshedpur, Jharkhand, India
- Campus: Urban 11.39 acres

Loyola College of Education, Jamshedpur, began as a college of Xavier School of Management in Jamshedpur in 1976 and in 1992 received its own campus in Telco, Jamshedpur.

In January 2021 the college was closed. In an announcement, the reasons given for the closure were that "the COVID-19 pandemic and the ensuing lockdown phases had weakened the financial and administrative structures making it impossible to manage the day-to-day affairs."

== History ==
In 1976 the American Jesuit Kenneth Judge founded the College of Education at the Xavier School of Management in response to a perceived need for teacher education in the states of Jharkhand and Bihar. It became a college in its own right in Telco in 1992. It has been registered under the Societies Registration Act, 1860 and recognized by the National Council for Teacher Education and the National Assessment and Accreditation Council (2010), and has received minority status.

== See also ==
- List of Jesuit sites
