= Namkum, Ranchi =

Namkum
- Neighbourhood
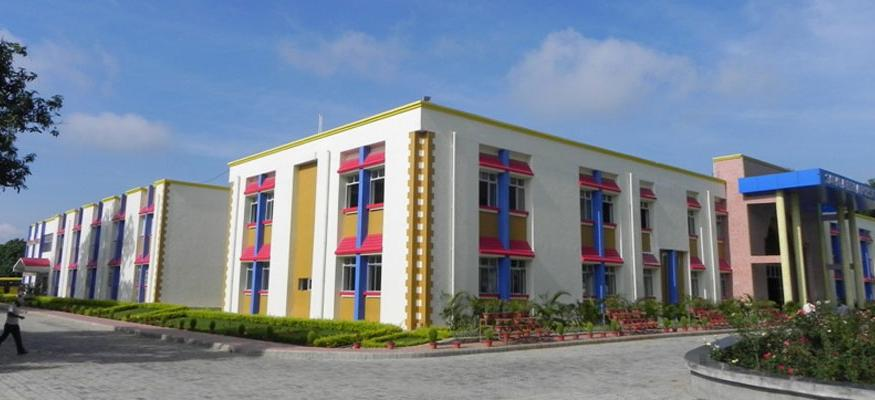
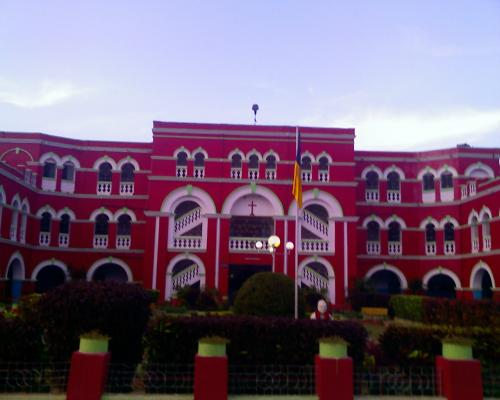
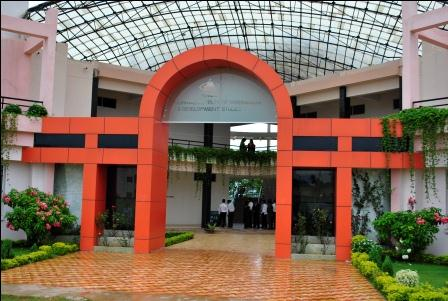
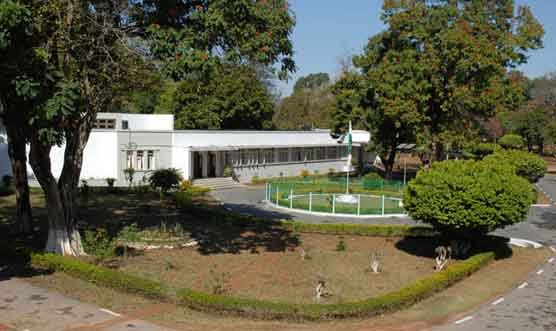

- Location in Jharkhand, India Namkum (India)
- Coordinates: 23.33732°N 85.37689°E
- Country: India
- State: Jharkhand
- District: Ranchi

Government
  - Type: Federal democracy

Languages (*For language details see Namkum#Language and religion)
  - Official: Hindi, Urdu
- Time zone: UTC+5:30 (IST)
- PIN: 834010
- Telephone/ STD code: 0651
- Vehicle registration: JH 01
- Lok Sabha constituency: Ranchi
- Vidhan Sabha constituency: Khijri
- Website: ranchi.nic.in

Namkum is a neighbourhood of Ranchi in the Ranchi Sadar subdivision of the Ranchi district in the Indian state of Jharkhand.

== Geography ==
Cities, towns and locations in Ranchi district in South Chotanagpur Division
M: municipality, CT: census town, R: rural/ urban centre, N: neighbourhood, T: tourist centre, D: dam, H: historical/ religious centre
Owing to space constraints in the small map, the actual locations in a larger map may vary slightly

=== Location ===
Namkum is located at 23.33732°N 85.37689°E

In the map of Namkum CD block on page 123 of the District Census Handbook 2011, Ranchi, Namkum is shown as a part of Ranchi statutory town. Further information about the wards, population etc. are not available.

=== Area overview ===
The map alongside shows a part of the Ranchi plateau, most of it at an average elevation of 2,140 feet above sea level. Only a small part in the north-eastern part of the district is the lower Ranchi plateau, spread over Silli, Rahe, Sonahatu and Tamar CD blocks, at an elevation of 500 to 1,000 feet above sea level. There is a 16 km long ridge south-west of Ranchi. There are isolated hills in the central plateau. The principal river of the district, the Subarnarekha, originates near Ratu, flows in an easterly direction and descends from the plateau, with a drop of about 300 feet at Hundru Falls. Subarnarekha and other important rivers are marked on the map. The forested area is shaded in the map. A major part of the North Karanpura Area and some fringe areas of the Piparwar Area of the Central Coalfields Limited, both located in the North Karanpura Coalfield, are in Ranchi district. There has been extensive industrial activity in Ranchi district, since independence. Ranchi district is the first in the state in terms of population. 8.83% of the total population of the state lives in this district - 56.9% is rural population and 43.1% is urban population.

Note: The map alongside presents some of the notable locations in the district. All places marked in the map are linked in the larger full screen map.

== Civic administration ==
=== Police station ===
There is a police station at Namkum.

=== CD block HQ ===
The headquarters of Namkum CD block are located at Namkum.

== Transport ==
=== Roadways ===
NH-33 and SH-01 pass through Namkum connecting major cities in the east such as Kolkata and Jamshedpur. A new ring road and an over-bridge is under construction in the area to reduce the growing traffic overload on the roads.

=== Railways ===
Namkon railway station (not Namkum), station code NKM, is the railway station serving the Namkum block of the capital city of Ranchi in the Ranchi district in the Indian state of Jharkhand. It belongs to the Ranchi division of the South Eastern Railway Zone of the Indian Railways.

=== Airways ===
The nearest airport is the Birsa Munda Airport of Ranchi. It has direct flights from Patna, Delhi, Mumbai and Kolkata. Kingfisher Airlines, Air India and GoAir provide service.

== Education ==
=== Colleges ===
- Indian Institute of Natural Resins and Gums
- Kejriwal Institute of Management and Development Studies
- Chotanagpur Law College
- ESI Hospital & Medical College
- Xavier Institute of Polytechnic and Technology
- ICAR RCER Research centre Plandu.

A number of schools and colleges are located in Namkum. The office of the Jharkhand Academic Council (JAC) is also located here.

=== Primary and secondary schools ===
Major school in the area include -

- Bishop Westcott Girls' School
- Bishop Westcott Boys' School
- Asisi High School
- Carmel Girls' High School
- St. Francis School
- Kendriya Vidyalaya Namkum
- Sarla Birla Public School
- Bishop Hartmann Academy
- Tender heart school
- Nirmala School.
- St. Katherine High School Ara Gate

== Gallery ==
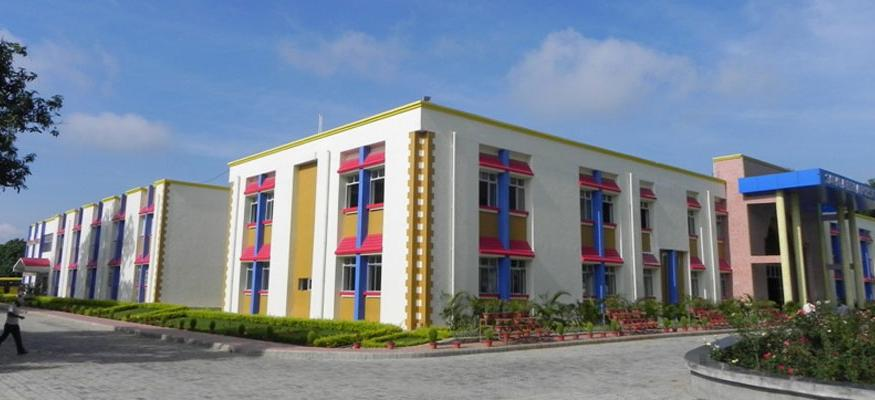
Sarla Birla Public School

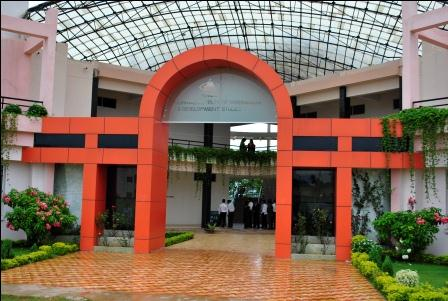
Kejriwal Institute of Management and Development Studies, Namkum, Ranchi

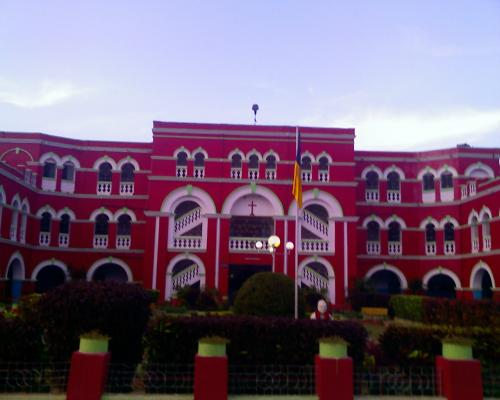
Bishop Westcott Boys' School

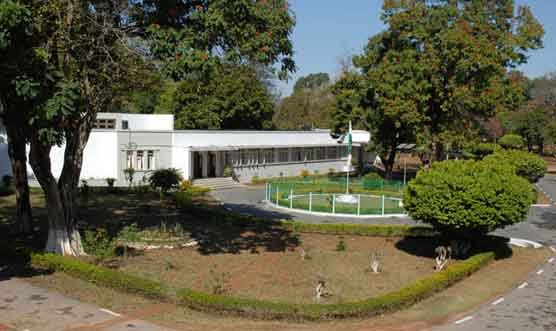
Indian Institute of Natural Resins and Gums

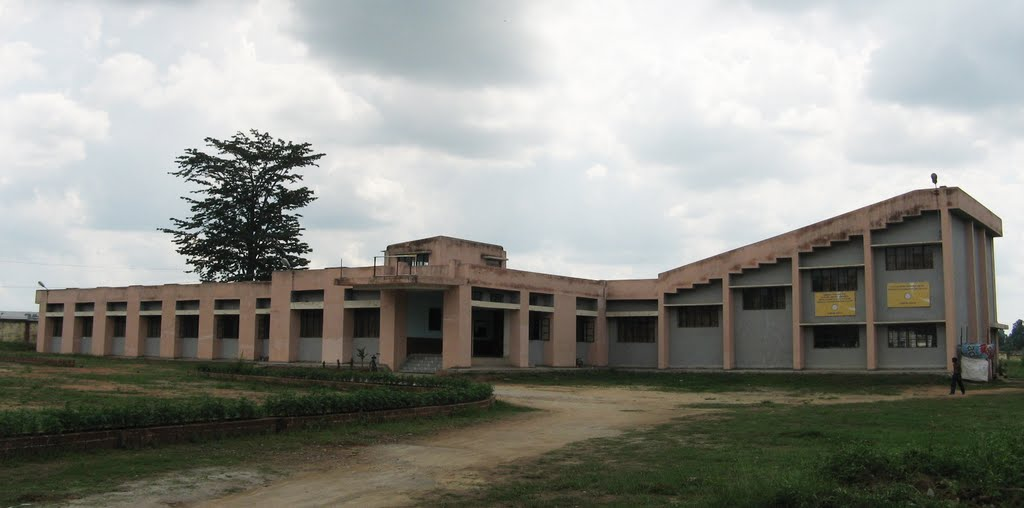
Chotanagpur Law College
