= St. Aloysius High School, Ranchi =

St. Aloysius High School
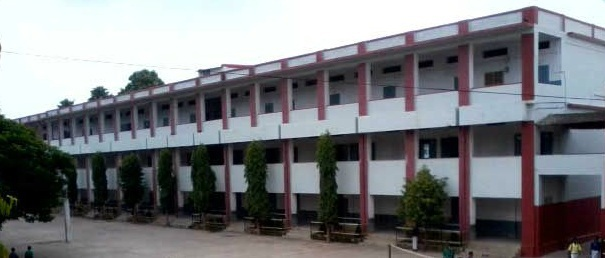

Location
- Camil Bulke Path (Purulia Road); Ranchi, Jharkhand; India; 23.3675096°N 85.3311631°E

Information
- Motto: Shubhrashya Shighram
- Established: 1902
- Principal: Brother Sylvestor Surin
- Faculty: 100+
- Enrollment: 3000+
- Area: 2.76 acres (11,200 m^{2})
- Colors: White and red
- Affiliations: Jharkhand Academic Council
- Website: www.staloysiusschool.co.in

St. Aloysius High School, Ranchi is a day school for boys in Ranchi, Jharkhand. It has an enrolment of 3,000 students attending its three divisions: high school, middle school and English medium school. It is affiliated with the Jharkhand Academic Council, For the last 15 years, the school has been awarded the Best School Award, scoring in the top position for the 10th board by the Ministry of Human Resource Development (India).

== History ==
St. Aloysius Primary school was founded in 1902 by Belgian Jesuit Father Louis Van Hoeck. It was started in a building at the St. Anne's Convent compound in a small village. Later when Fr. Edouard De Meulder became headmaster, the middle school building was constructed to accommodate new students. The primary school received recognition from Ranchi municipality on 15 April 1936 and the middle school was recognized on 1 January 1949. In those days St. John's was the only Catholic boys' high-school. Fr. Aloysius de Raat put up a four-room school building and opened class VIII.

By this time the Brothers of St. Gabriel were already in Konbir-Noatoli and the Archbishop and the Jesuit priests were impressed by their life and work. The St. Aloysius' school was offered to them. The offer by the Diocese was accepted by the Provincial Council of the Brothers held on 21–22 March 1957.

An agreement was signed on 4 December 1954 by Rev. Nicholas Kujur, the Archbishop of Ranchi on the transfer of the administration and management of St. Aloysius School to the Brothers of Saint Gabriel. This agreement was effective "from first of June 1957".

Bro. Marcel Joseph, the Superior and Headmaster of St. Joseph's School, Konbir-Noatoli, was transferred to St. Aloysius School. He brought with him Bro. Mathurin and two other young Brothers.

At this point, the high school began running. In those days Cl VIII to XI formed the high school section. The school was hardly known in the locality and the students who came here were of a lower socioeconomic status. The school faced many problems, namely that they were not recognized by the state education department.

== See also ==
- Education in India
- Literacy in India
- List of schools in India

== Gallery ==
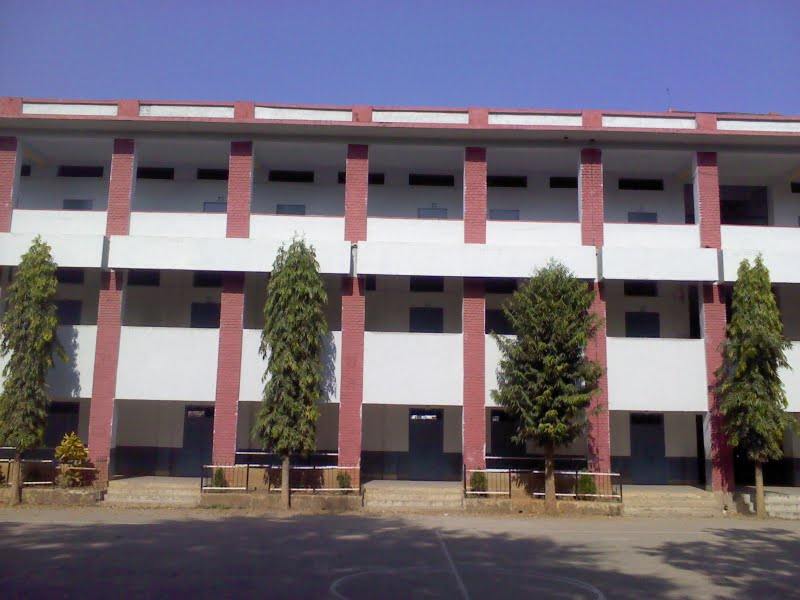
St Aloysius High School Ranchi Jharkhand

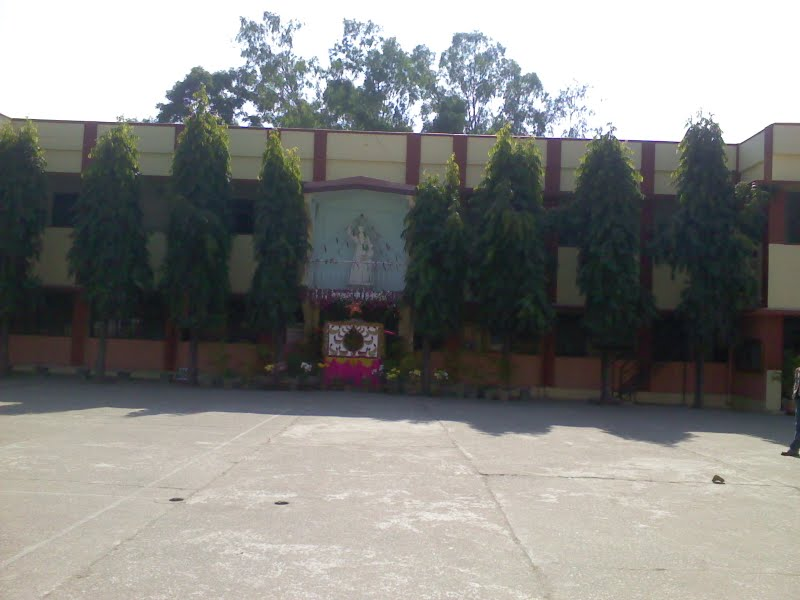
Front view of St. Aloysius High School

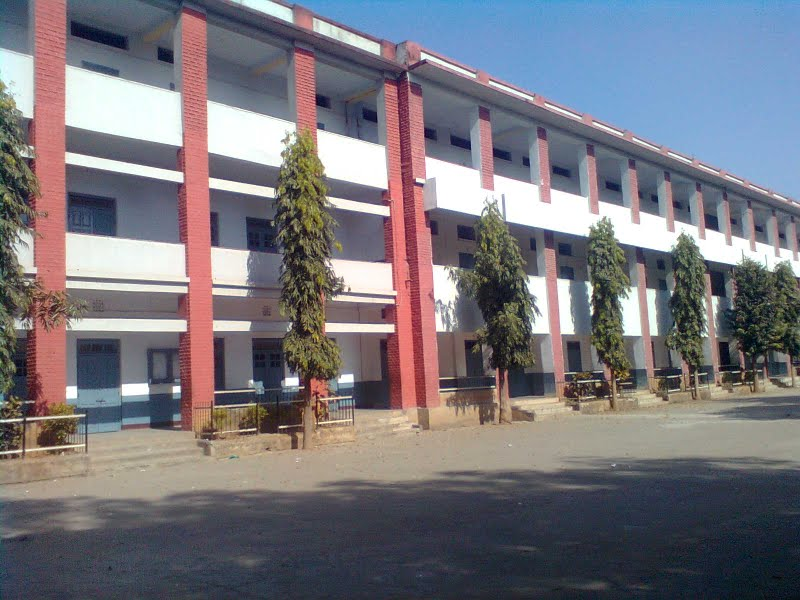
St. Aloysius School
