= Bistupur =

- Neighbourhood and business district
- Bistupur
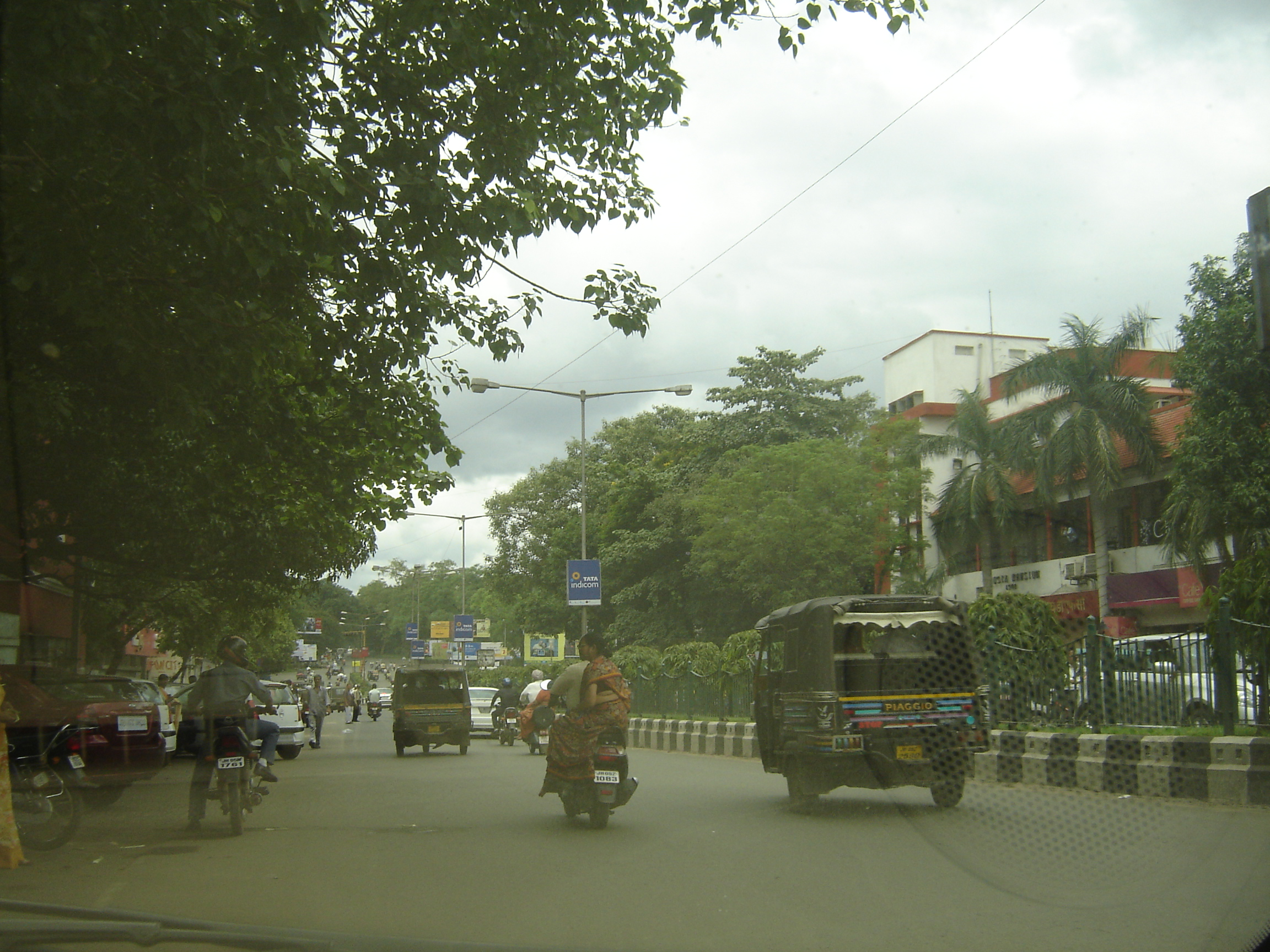
- P&M Hi-Tech City Centre Mall at night
- Interactive map of Bistupur
- Coordinates: 22°47′29″N 86°10′50″E
- Country: India
- City: Jamshedpur

Languages
  - Official: Hindi, Urdu
- Time zone: GMT + 0530
- Postal code: 831001

Bistupur is a neighbourhood in Jamshedpur, Jharkhand, India. It is located in central Jamshedpur and is bordered by Tata Steel and Northern Town to the east, Dhatkidih and Kadma to the north, Adityapur to the west and Jugsalai to the south. One of the oldest neighbourhoods. The Kharkai River flows through the westernmost side of Bistupur.

One of the earliest settlements formed during the planning of Jamshedpur, Bistupur emerged as one of the most affluent neighborhoods of Jamshedpur. The neighborhood is deeply rooted in historical significance, due to presence of numerous landmarks packed in stories. Ram Mandir is considered to be more than 100 years old. Regal Building was built in 1936, with leftover steel for Howrah Bridge in Kolkata. St. Mary's Church in South Park is oldest Catholic Church in Jamshedpur. Today, Bistupur is home to a large number of shopping malls, hotels, insurance companies, showrooms, restaurants and clubs.

During the establishment of Jamshedpur this area was established. This place was a commercial area. During the time of the British, The Regal Building was built. It is one of the oldest buildings in Jamshedpur. It is now a shopping mall. Other historical buildings in Bistupur include Muslim Library, Tata Steel Gate, Bistupur Masjid, Tata Steel Guest House and Circuit House. During World War II, troops came to stay at Circuit House.

== Civic administration ==
There is a police station at Bistupur.

== Education ==
=== Schools ===
- DAV Public School
- St Mary's English High School
- NHES

=== Colleges ===
- Jamshedpur Co-operative College
- GIIT Professional College
- Jamshedpur Co-operative Law College, Jamshedpur
- Mrs KMPM Vocational College, Jamshedpur

=== University ===
- Jamshedpur Women's University

== Tourist attractions ==
- P&M Hi-Tech City Centre Mall

== Landmarks and gallery ==
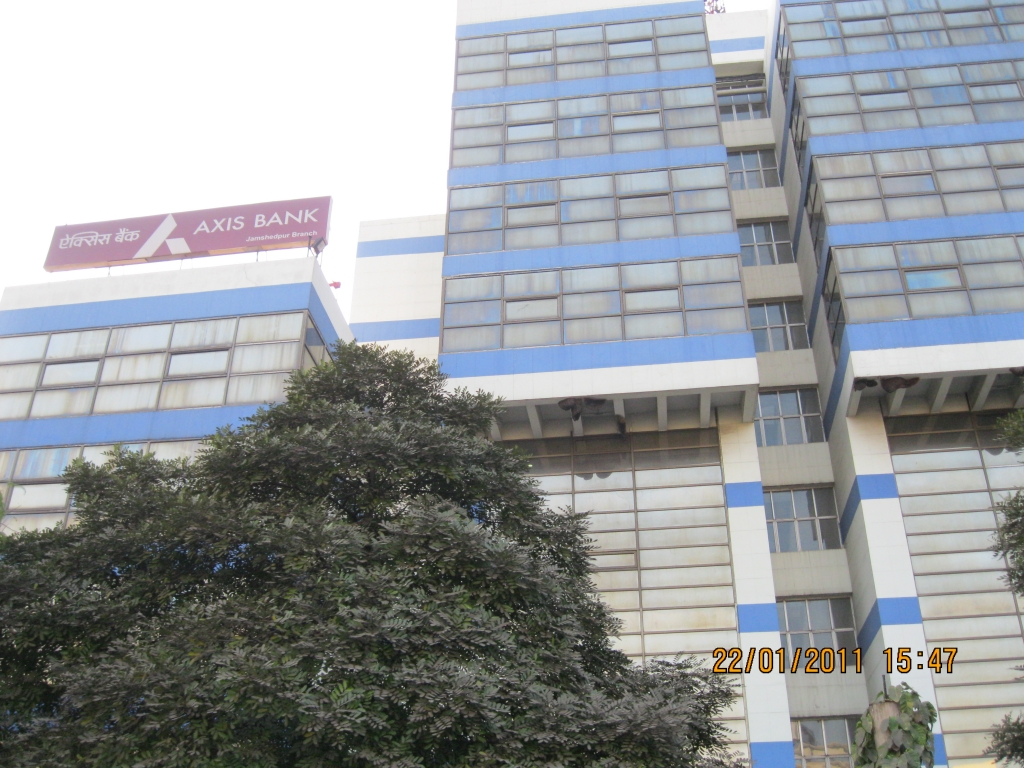
Voltas House Building

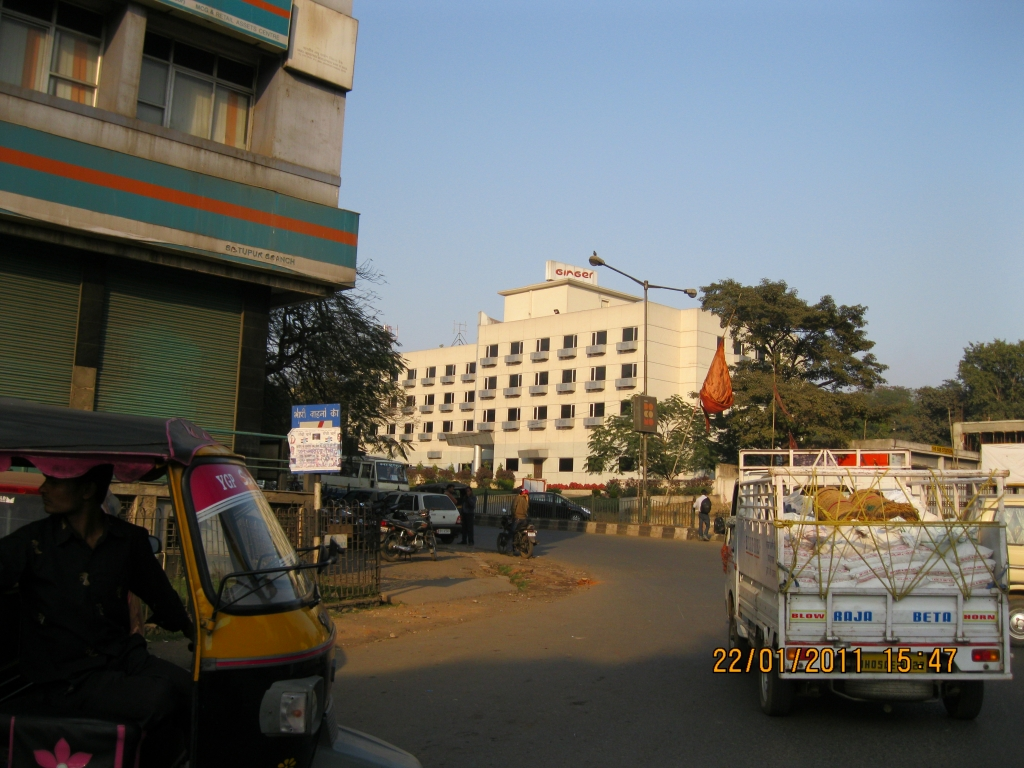
Ginger Hotel

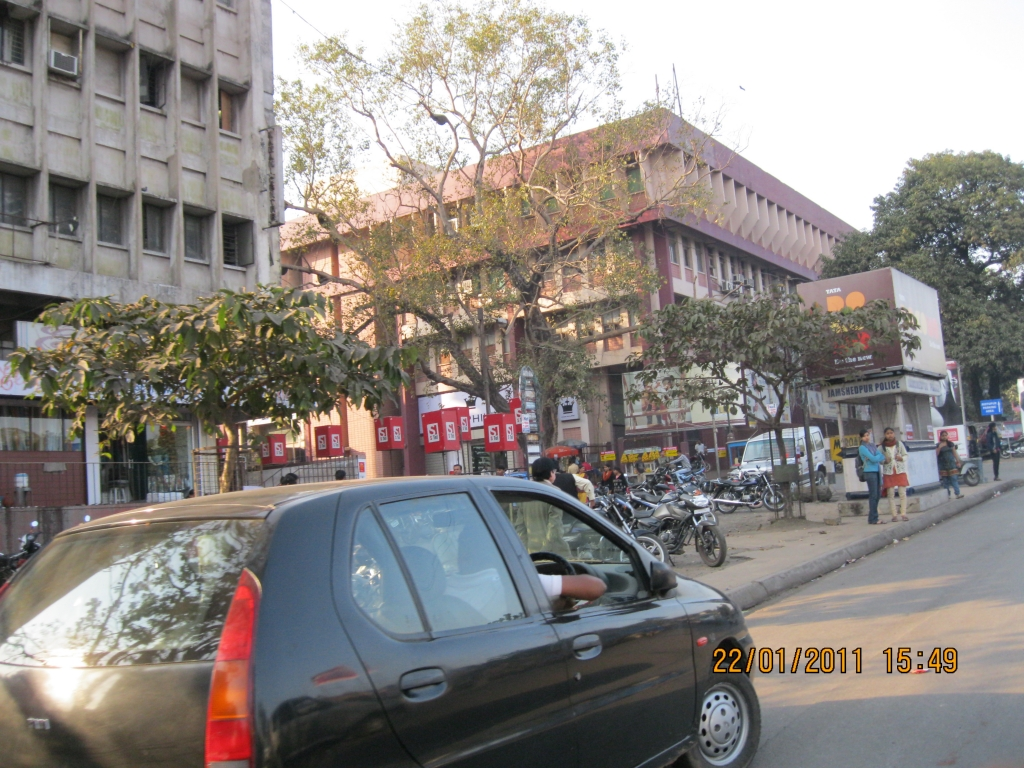
LIC Building, Bistupur main road

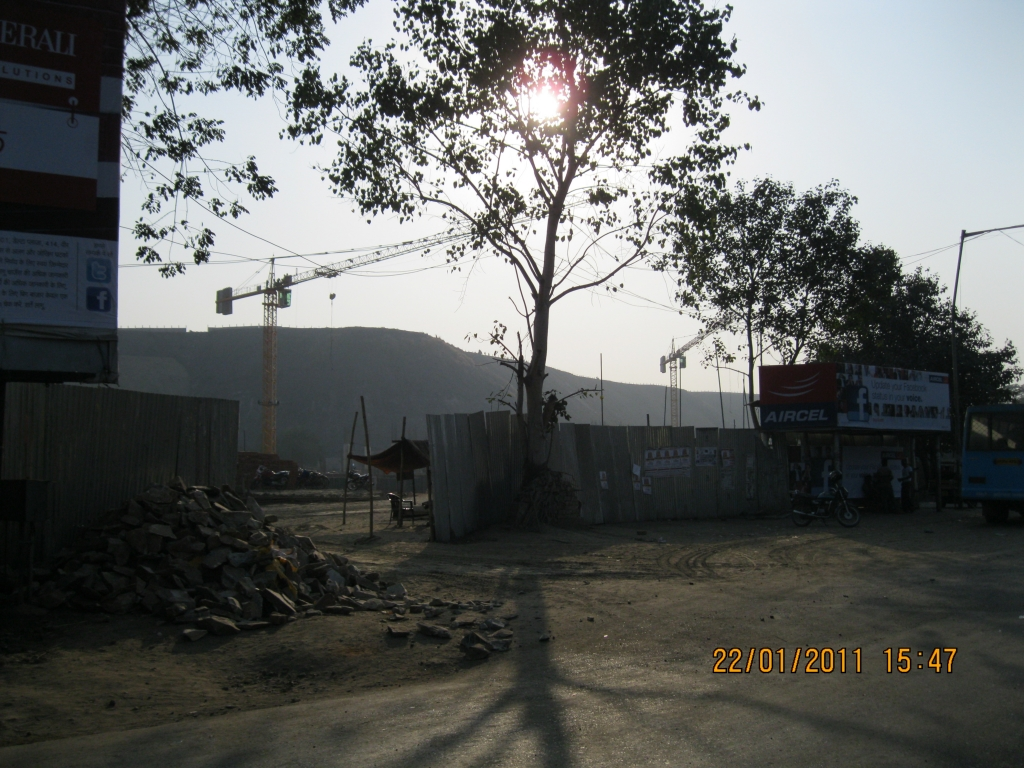
Centenary mall and multiplex project site in Bistupur (near Voltas House)

== See also ==
- Adityapur
- Jugsalai
- Kadma
- List of neighbourhoods of Jamshedpur
