= Ananth Raman =

American economist

Ananth Raman is an economist, focusing in supply chain management and the investors’ perspective on operations, currently the UPS Foundation Professor of Business Logistics at Harvard Business School.
