= De Nobili School, CMRI =

- Vidya Dadaati Vinyam

Location
- Jai Prakash Nagar; Dhanbad, Jharkhand; India; 23°48′31″N 86°25′33″E

Information
- Type: Private primary and secondary school
- Motto: In all things to love and serve विद्यां ददाति विनयं! (Vidya Dadati Vinayam)
- Religious affiliation: Catholicism
- Denomination: Jesuit
- Established: 1977; 49 years ago
- President: Rev. Fr. Jerome Cutinha, SJ
- Director: Rev. Fr. Michael P. Fernandes, SJ
- Principal: Mr G.T. Kennedy
- Teaching staff: 102
- Grades: LKG-12
- Gender: Coeducational
- Enrollment: 4000
- Affiliations: ICSE/ISC
- Website: www.denobilicmri.in

De Nobili School, CMRI is a private Catholic primary and secondary school located in Dhanbad, Jharkhand, India. The school draws it name from its association with the former Central Mining Research Institute (CMRI) and has classes one through twelve. The school is run by the Society of Jesus.

The school is named after a christian mission and Jesuit, Roberto de Nobili, who was the first foreigner to master Sanskrit, incognito, in sixteenth century Madurai. He apparently conducted himself like an orthodox Brahmin and is even said to have declared himself to be a descendant of Brahma.

== Program ==
De Nobili is an English medium school and other languages and cultures are taught in the curriculum. Courses of study offered lead to the Indian Certificate of Secondary Education (ICSE) examinations in Class 10 and the Indian School Certificate (ISC) examinations in Class 12.

=== Administration ===
Under the administration of De Nobili Jealgora, there are Nine English medium schools (FRI, CMRI, Chandrapura, Maithon, Mugma, Sijua (Koradih), Sindri, Bhuli, and Gomoh) and two Hindi medium schools (DBH, Gomoh and St. Xavier's Tundi) and one Bengali medium at Jilling, Purulia functioning in the Districts of Dhanbad and Bokaro of Jharkhand and Purulia of west Bengal. There are more than17000 students studying in these schools and there are more than 800 teaching and 300 non-teaching staff members.

Five of these schools at CMRI, Chandrapura, Maithon, Mugma and Sindri, are functioning in agreement with the Public Sector Companies/institutions. The Director of De Nobili Schools coordinates the common academic and co-curricular activities of De Nobili Schools.

== See also ==
- List of Jesuit schools
- List of schools in Jharkhand
- Violence against Christians in India
