= Kadma, Jamshedpur =

Kadma
- Residential area in Jamshedpur
- Kadma
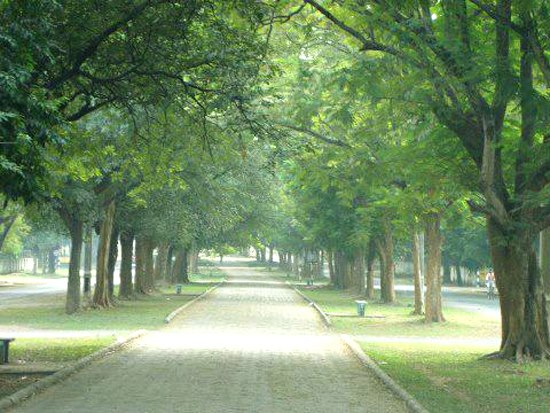
- Interactive map of Kadma
- Coordinates: 22°48′21″N 86°09′57″E
- Country: India
- City: Jamshedpur

Government
  - Type: Tata company quarters' area are governed by JUSCO, while large part of residential areas are governed by JNAC.

Population
  - Total: 100,000
- Time zone: GMT + 0530
- PIN Code: 831005

Kadma is a neighbourhood in the city of Jamshedpur, Jharkhand, India. It is a residential area. The area has both the residential quarters of Tata Steel and private residential apartment buildings.

== Civic administration ==
There is a police station at Kadma.

== See also ==
- Bistupur
- Sakchi
- Sonari, Jamshedpur
- List of neighbourhoods of Jamshedpur
