= Dumaria =

Dumaria may refer to one of the following villages in India:

- Dumaria, Chandauli district, in Uttar Pradesh state
- Dumaria, Gaya district, in Bihar state
- Dumaria block, a community development block in Jharkhand, India
- Dumaria, Purvi Singhbhum, a village in Jharkhand, India
