= Baharagora block =

Baharagora
- Community development block
- Coordinates: 22.3485°N 86.7167°E
- Country: India
- State: Jharkhand
- District: East Singhbhum

Government
  - Type: Federal democracy

Area
  - Total: 351.10 km^{2} (135.56 sq mi)

Population (2011)
  - Total: 153,051
  - Density: 435.92/km^{2} (1,129.0/sq mi)

Languages
  - Official: Hindi, Bengali
- Time zone: UTC+5:30 (IST)
- PIN: 832101
- Telephone/STD code: 0657
- Vehicle registration: JH 05
- Literacy: 64.45%
- Lok Sabha constituency: Jamshedpur
- Vidhan Sabha constituency: Baharagora
- Website: jamshedpur.nic.in

Baharagora block is a CD block that forms an administrative division in the Ghatshila subdivision of East Singhbhum district, in the Indian state of Jharkhand.

== History ==
The laying of the foundation stone of the steel plant by Tata Steel (then known as Tata Iron and Steel Company) in 1907 at Sakchi Kalimati in Singhbhum district marked the beginning of the industrialisation of the area. The first police station in the area was opened in 1912 at Jugsalai. The Kalimati Sakchi village was renamed ‘Jamshedpur’ in 1917. Dhalbhum subdivision was created in 1920 with Jamshedpur as headquarters. Jamshedpur Notified Area was established in 1924. East Singhbhum district, with Jamshedpur as headquarters, was set up in 1990.

== Geography ==
Baharagora is located at 22.3485°N 86.7167°E.

“The district forms a part of the Chota Nagpur Plateau and is a hilly upland tract”. The Seraikela Dhalbhumgarh upland and the Dalma range are natural divisions of the district. The main rivers are the Subarnarekha and the Kharkai.

The district consists of two subdivisions - (1) Dhalbhum subdivision with Patamda, Boram, Golmuri-cum-Jugsalai and Potka CD blocks, and (2) Ghatshila subdivision with Ghatshila, Dhalbhumgarh, Musabani, Dumaria, Gurbandha, Chakulia and Baharagora CD blocks.

Baharagora CD block is bounded by the Chakulia CD block on the north, the Gopiballavpur I and Gopiballavpur II CD blocks in the Jhargram district of the West Bengal state to the east, the Saraskana CD block in the Mayurbhanj district of the Odisha state on the south, and the Gurbandha CD block on the west.
Note: Jhargram is a new district, carved out of Paschim Medinipur district, in West Bengal and maps are yet to be updated.

Baharagora CD block has an area of 351.10 km^{2}.Bahragora police station serves Baharagora CD block. The headquarters of Baharagora CD block is located at Baharagora village.

== Demographics ==
=== Population ===
According to the 2011 Census of India, Baharagora CD block had a total population of 153,051, all of which were rural. There were 78,103 (51%) males and 74,988 (49%) females. Population in the age range 0–6 years was 19,937. Scheduled Castes numbered 10,466 (6.84%) and Scheduled Tribes numbered 54,968 (35.91%).

=== Literacy ===
According to the 2011 census, the total number of literate persons in Baharagora CD block was 85,794 (64.45% of the population over 6 years) out of which males numbered 50,489 (74.42% of the male population over 6 years) and females numbered 35,305 (54.09% of the female population over 6 years). The gender disparity (the difference between female and male literacy rates) was 20.32%.

As of 2011 census, literacy in Purbi Singhbhum district was 76.13%. Literacy in Jharkhand was 67.63% in 2011. Literacy in India in 2011 was 74.04%.

See also – List of Jharkhand districts ranked by literacy rate

Literacy in CD Blocks of
Purbi Singhbhum district
Dhalbhum subdivision
Patamda – 59.37%
Boram – 58.02%
Golmuri-cum-Jugsalai – 79.00%
Potka – 64.09%
Ghatshila subdivision
Ghatshila – 70.72%
Musabani – 70.94%
Dumaria – 57.11%
Dhalbhumgarh – 62.75%
Gurbandha – 55.05%
Chakulia – 64.35%
Baharagora – 64.45%
Source: 2011 Census: CD block Wise
Primary Census Abstract Data

== Language and religion ==
Languages in Baharagora CD block (2011)
1. Bengali (59.6%)
2. Santali (18.3%)
3. Odia (11.9%)
4. Mundari (8.48%)
5. Hindi (0.93%)
6. Others (0.81%)

According to the Population by Mother Tongue 2011 data, in the Baharagora subdistrict, Bengali was the mother-tongue of 91,255 persons forming 59.62% of the population, followed by (number of persons and percentage of population in brackets) Santali (27,973/18.28), Odia (18,181/11.88), Mundari (12,982/8.48%), Hindi (1,583/ 1.03%), and persons with other languages as mother-tongue (1,077/ 0.18%).

Note: An attempt has been made to include all language groups each with at least 500 persons as their mother-tongue and only those groups with less than 500 persons as their mother-tongue are included in the “other languages” category. Comparatively smaller language groups with 200+ persons as their mother-tongue are mentioned in the text. Many languages have sub-groups. Those who are interested can see the reference for more details.

Hindi is the official language in Jharkhand and Urdu has been declared as an additional official language.

Religion in Baharagora CD block (2011)
Hinduism	80.96%
Sarna	17.99%
Islam	0.83%
Other or not stated	0.22%

According to the Population by Religious Communities 2011 data, in the Baharagora subdistrict, Hindus numbered 123,905 and formed 80.96% of the population, followed by (number of persons and percentage of population in brackets) Other religious communities (27,573/ 18.02%), Muslims (1,270/ 0.83%), Christians (158/ 0.10%), and persons who did not state their religion (145/ 0.09%).

== Economy ==
=== Overview ===
NITI Aayog (National Institution for Transforming India) has released the National Multidimensional Poverty Index (NMPI) baseline report in November 2021. “MPI is calculated using 12 segments - nutrition, child and adolescent mortality, antenatal care, years of schooling, school attendance, cooking fuel, sanitation, drinking water, electricity, housing, assets and bank account, as compared to the previous approach of just considering the poverty line”. Approximately 25.01% population of the country was multidimensionally poor. State-wise Bihar was the poorest with 51.91% of the population being poor, followed by Jharkhand with 42.16% of the population being poor. The silver lining in this scenario is that within Jharkhand, the richest districts are East Singhbhum, Dhanbad, Bokaro, and Ranchi. These districts are having industries and/or mining activity. However, CD blocks still largely dependent on agriculture have remained traditional.

=== Livelihood ===
Livelihood
in Baharagora CD block
1. Cultivators (17.1%)
2. Agricultural labourers (63.5%)
3. Household industries (3.48%)
4. Other Workers (15.9%)

In Baharagora CD block in 2011, amongst the class of total workers, cultivators numbered 11,589 and formed 17.12%, agricultural labourers numbered 42,998 and formed 63.53%, household industry workers numbered 2,353 and formed 3.48% and other workers numbered 10,751 and formed 15.87%. Total workers numbered 67,681 and formed 44.22% of the total population non-workers numbered 85,370 and formed 55.78% of the population.

=== Infrastructure ===
There are 359 inhabited villages in Baharagora CD block. In 2011, 348 villages had power supply. 10 villages had tap water, 298 villages had well water (covered/ uncovered), 338 villages had hand pumps, and 4 villages did not have drinking water facility. 34 villages had post offices, 20 villages had sub post offices, 61 villages had telephone (land line), 210 villages had mobile phone coverage. 355 villages had pucca (paved) village roads, 56 villages had bus service (public/ private), 43 villages had autos/ modified autos, 54 villages had taxi/ vans, 97 villages had tractors. 37 villages had bank branches, 6 villages had agricultural credit societies, 24 villages had cinema/ video halls, 48 villages had availability of newspapers, 167 villages had ration shops, 113 villages had weekly haat, 168 villages had assembly polling stations.

== Education ==
Baharagora CD block had 22 villages with pre-primary schools, 208 villages with primary schools, 84 villages with middle schools, 20 villages with secondary schools, 2 villages with senior secondary schools, 1 special school for disabled, 143 villages with no educational facility.
.*Senior secondary schools are also known as Inter colleges in Jharkhand

Baharagora College was established at Baharagora in 1969.

== Healthcare ==
Baharagora CD block had 3 villages with primary health centres, 7 villages with primary health subcentres, 5 villages with maternity and child welfares centres, 4 villages with allopathic hospitals, 4 villages with dispensaries, 1 village with veterinary hospital, 3 villages with family welfare centres, 19 villages with medicine shops.
.*Private medical practitioners, alternative medicine etc. not included
