= Boram (disambiguation) =

Boram redirects to Jeon Boram.

It also refers to

- Boram block - a community development block in Jharkhand, India
- Boram, Purvi Singhbhum - a village in Jharkhand, India
