= Ghatshila block =

Ghatshila
- Community development block
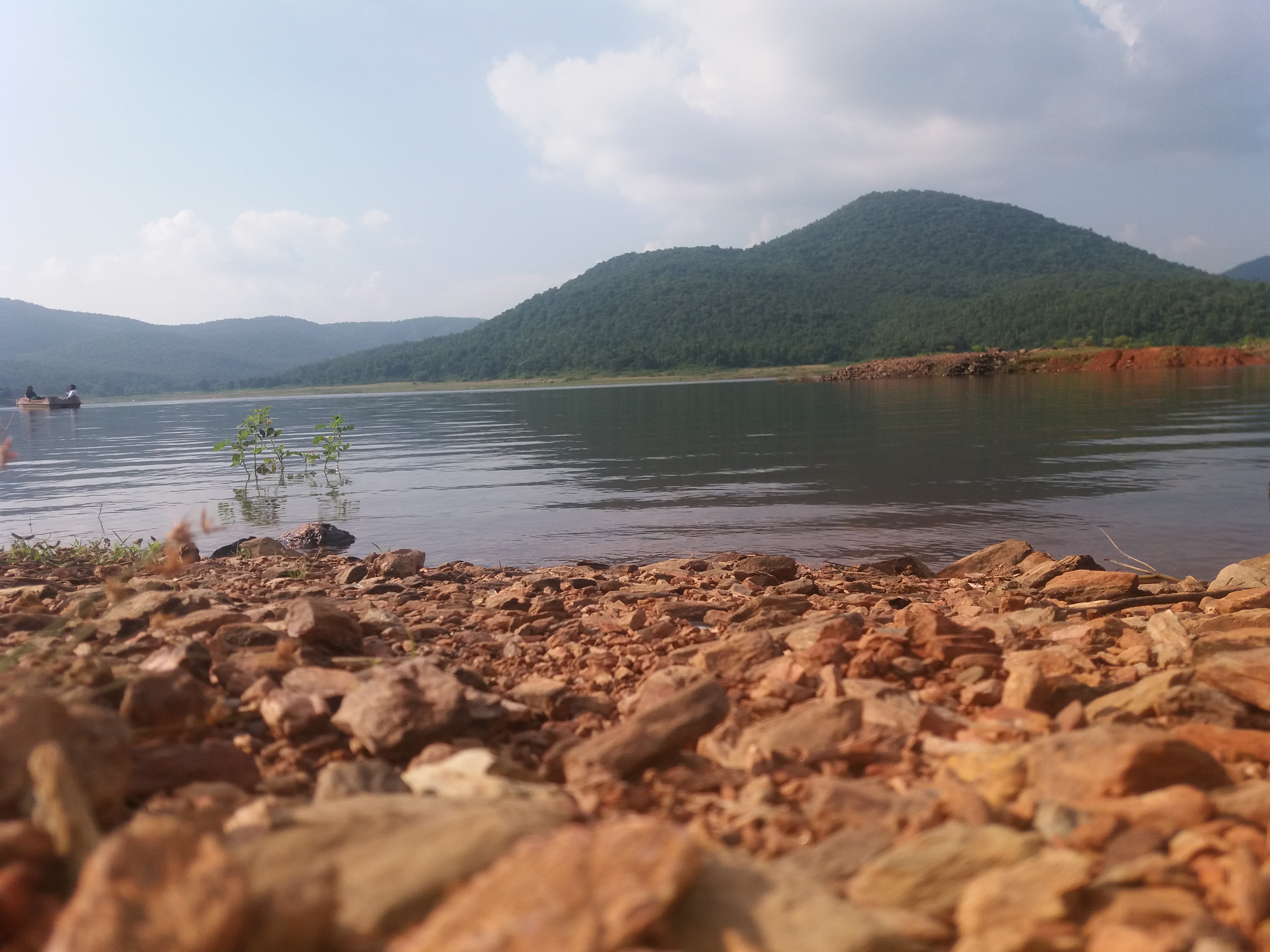
- Burudi lake in Ghatshila block

- Coordinates: 22.5921°N 86.4743°E
- Country: India
- State: Jharkhand
- District: East Singhbhum

Government
  - Type: Federal democracy

Area
  - Total: 349.12 km^{2} (134.80 sq mi)

Population (2011)
  - Total: 129,905
  - Density: 372.09/km^{2} (963.72/sq mi)

Languages
  - Official: Hindi, Bengali, English
  - Most spoken language: Bengali
- Time zone: UTC+5:30 (IST)
- PIN: 832103-832303
- Telephone/STD code: 0657
- Vehicle registration: JH 05
- Literacy: 70.02%
- Lok Sabha constituency: Jamshedpur
- Vidhan Sabha constituency: Ghatsila
- Website: jamshedpur.nic.in

Ghatshila block is a community development (CD) block that forms an administrative division in the Ghatshila subdivision of East Singhbhum district, in the Indian state of Jharkhand.

== History ==
The laying of the foundation stone of the steel plant by Tata Steel (then known as Tata Iron and Steel Company) in 1907 at Sakchi Kalimati in Singhbhum district marked the beginning of the industrialisation of the area. The first police station in the area was opened in 1912 at Jugsalai. The Kalimati Sakchi village was renamed ‘Jamshedpur’ in 1917. Dhalbhum subdivision was created in 1920 with Jamshedpur as headquarters. Jamshedpur Notified Area was established in 1924. East Singhbhum district, with Jamshedpur as headquarters, was set up in 1990.

Ghatshila was earlier the headquarters of the Rajas of Dhalbhum. Ghatshila block was established in 1962 with headquarters at Ghatshila.

== Geography ==
Ghatshila is located at 22.5921°N 86.4743°E.

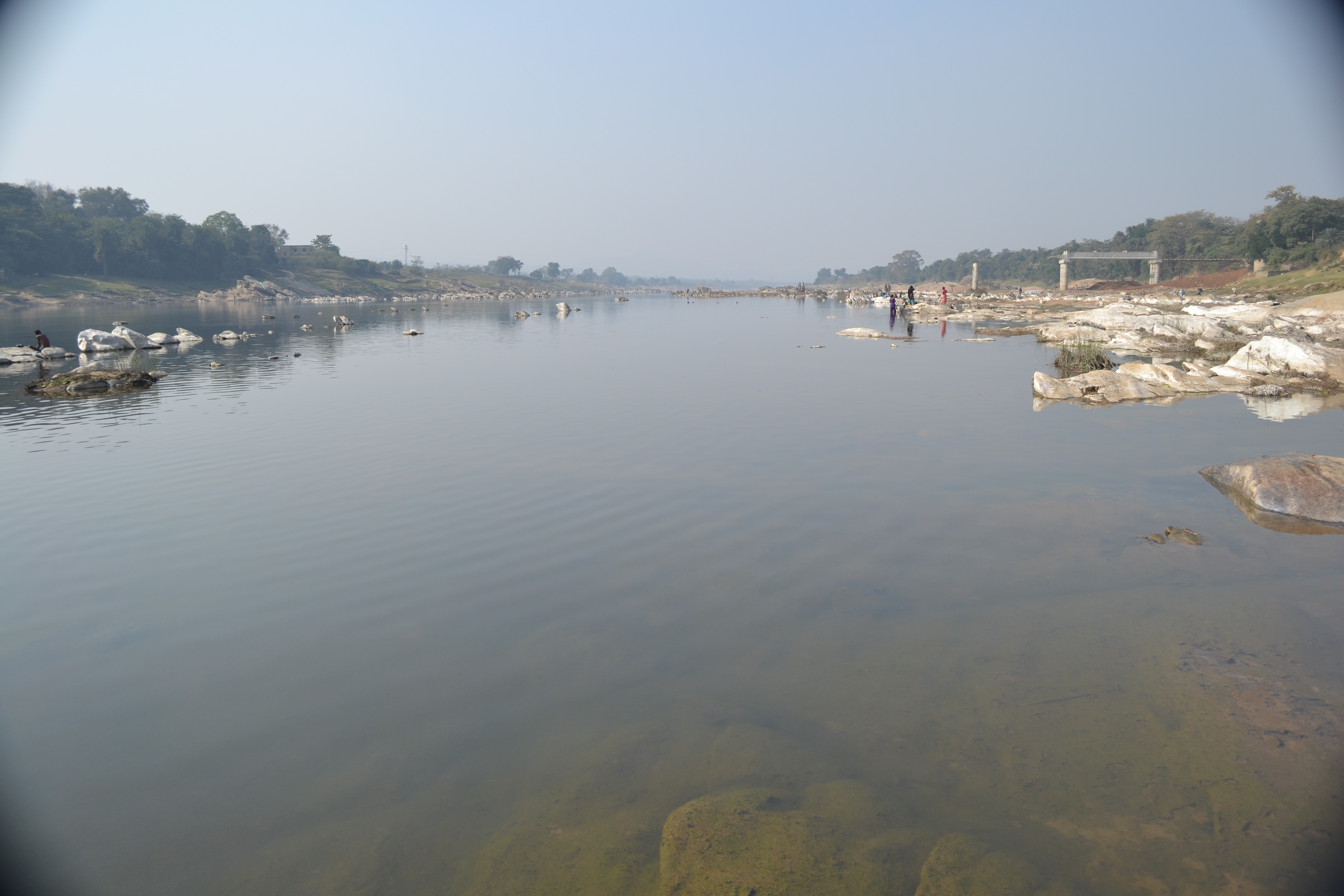
Subarnarekha at Ghatshila

“The district forms a part of the Chota Nagpur Plateau and is a hilly upland tract”. The Seraikela Dhalbhumgarh upland and the Dalma range are natural divisions of the district. The main rivers are the Subarnarekha and the Kharkai.

The district consists of two subdivisions - (1) Dhalbhum subdivision with Patamda, Boram, Golmuri-cum-Jugsalai and Potka CD blocks, and (2) Ghatshila subdivision with Ghatshila, Dhalbhumgarh, Musabani, Dumaria, Gurbandha, Chakulia and Baharagora CD blocks.

Ghatshila CD block is bounded by the Bandwan CD block in the Purulia district and Binpur II CD block in the Jhargram district of the West Bengal state on the north, the Dhalbhumgarh CD block on the east, the Musabani CD block on the south, and the Potka and the Golmuri-cum-Jugsalai CD blocks on the west.
Note: Jhargram is a new district, carved out of Paschim Medinipur district, in West Bengal and maps are yet to be updated.

Ghatshila CD block has an area of 349.12 km^{2}.Ghatshila and Galudih police stations serve Ghatshila CD block. The headquarters of Ghatshila CD block is located at Ghatshila town.

== Demographics ==
=== Population ===
According to the 2011 Census of India, Ghatshila CD block had a total population of 129,905, of which 89,281 were rural and 40,624 were urban. There were 65,918 (51%) males and 63,987 (49%) females. Population in the age range 0–6 years was 16,571. Scheduled Castes numbered 8,473 (6.52%) and Scheduled Tribes numbered 54,664 (42.08%).
Note: There seems to be a mismatch between the ST and language figures. The figures quoted here are as officially published on the internet. Percentages have been calculated.

The only Census town in the Ghatshila CD block is (2011 population figure in brackets): Ghatshila (40,624).

=== Literacy ===
According to the 2011 census, the total number of literate persons in Ghatshila CD block was 80,151 (70.72% of the population over 6 years) out of which males numbered 46,291 (80.54% of the male population over 6 years) and females numbered 33,860 (60.61% of the female population over 6 years). The gender disparity (the difference between female and male literacy rates) was 19.93%.

As of 2011 census, literacy in Purbi Singhbhum district was 76.13%. Literacy in Jharkhand was 67.63% in 2011. Literacy in India in 2011 was 74.04%.

See also – List of Jharkhand districts ranked by literacy rate

Literacy in CD Blocks of
Purbi Singhbhum district
Dhalbhum subdivision
Patamda – 59.37%
Boram – 58.02%
Golmuri-cum-Jugsalai – 79.00%
Potka – 64.09%
Ghatshila subdivision
Ghatshila – 70.72%
Musabani – 70.94%
Dumaria – 57.11%
Dhalbhumgarh – 62.75%
Gurbandha – 55.05%
Chakulia – 64.35%
Baharagora – 64.45%
Source: 2011 Census: CD block Wise
Primary Census Abstract Data

== Language and religion ==
Languages in Ghatshila CD block (2011)
1. Bengali (54.1%)
2. Santali (27.9%)
3. Hindi (6.19%)
4. Urdu (2.41%)
5. Mundari (1.97%)
6. Odia (1.86%)
7. Bhojpuri (1.51%)
8. Ho (1.24%)
9. Other languages (2.75%)

According to the Population by Mother Tongue 2011 data, in the Ghatshila subdistrict, Bengali was the mother-tongue of 70,318 persons forming 54.13% of the population, followed by (number of persons and percentage of population in brackets) Santali (36,374/ 28.00%), Hindi (11,188/ 8.61%), Urdu (3,161/ 2.43%), Mundari (2,519/ 1.94%), Odia (2,412/ 1.86%), Ho (1,617/ 1.24%), Punjabi (927/ 0.71%), and persons with other languages as mother-tongue (1,399/ 1.08%). Other languages included 489 persons having Maithili as mother-tongue.

Note: An attempt has been made to include all language groups each with at least 500 persons as their mother-tongue and only those groups with less than 500 persons as their mother-tongue are included in the “other languages” category. Comparatively smaller language groups with 200+ persons as their mother-tongue are mentioned in the text. Many languages have sub-groups. Those who are interested can see the reference for more details.

Hindi is the official language in Jharkhand and Urdu has been declared as an additional official language.

Religion in Ghatshila CD block (2011)
Hinduism	64.14%
Sarna	29.58%
Islam	4.53%
Christianity	0.91%
Sikhism	0.74%
Other or not stated	0.10%

According to the Population by Religious Communities 2011 data, in the Ghatshila subdistrict, Hindus numbered 83,327 and formed 64.14% of the population, followed by (number of persons and percentage of population in brackets) Other religious communities (39,423/ 30.35%), Muslims (5,882/ 4.53%), Christians (1,187/ 0.91%), and persons who did not state their religion (86/ 0.07%).

== Economy ==
=== Overview ===
NITI Aayog (National Institution for Transforming India) has released the National Multidimensional Poverty Index (NMPI) baseline report in November 2021. “MPI is calculated using 12 segments - nutrition, child and adolescent mortality, antenatal care, years of schooling, school attendance, cooking fuel, sanitation, drinking water, electricity, housing, assets and bank account, as compared to the previous approach of just considering the poverty line”. Approximately 25.01% population of the country was multidimensionally poor. State-wise Bihar was the poorest with 51.91% of the population being poor, followed by Jharkhand with 42.16% of the population being poor. The silver lining in this scenario is that within Jharkhand, the richest districts are East Singhbhum, Dhanbad, Bokaro, and Ranchi. These districts are having industries and/or mining activity. However, CD blocks still largely dependent on agriculture have remained traditional.

=== Livelihood ===
Livelihood
in Ghatshila CD block
1. Cultivators (22.6%)
2. Agricultural labourers (26.9%)
3. Household industries (3.58%)
4. Other Workers (46.9%)

In Ghatshila CD block in 2011, amongst the class of total workers, cultivators numbered 11,532 and formed 22.60%, agricultural labourers numbered 13,745 and formed 26.94%, household industry workers numbered 1,829 and formed 3.58% and other workers numbered 23,924 and formed 46.88%. Total workers numbered 51,030 and formed 39.28% of the total population non-workers numbered 78,875 and formed 60.72% of the population.

=== Infrastructure ===
There are 152 inhabited villages in Ghatshila CD block. In 2011, 136 villages had power supply. 23 villages had tap water, 135 villages had well water (covered/ uncovered), 143 villages had hand pumps, and 3 villages did not have drinking water facility. 13 villages had post offices, 5 villages had sub post offices, 23 villages had telephone (land line), 75 villages had mobile phone coverage. 148 villages had pucca (paved) village roads, 42 villages had bus service (public/ private), 18 villages had autos/ modified autos, 15 villages had taxi/ vans, 54 villages had tractors. 21 villages had bank branches, 17 village had agricultural credit society, 15 villages had cinema/ video halls, 30 villages had availability of newspapers, 102 villages had ration shops, 79 villages had weekly haat, 90 villages had assembly polling stations.

=== Copper industry ===
The Indian Copper Corporation, a British company, set up the Indian Copper Complex at Ghatshila in 1930. It was nationalised in 1972 and merged with Hindustan Copper Limited. It has copper mines at Surda, Siddheswari Chapri, Kendadih, Patharbera and Rakha and processing plants such as concentrator and smelter at Moubhander, about a mile Ghatshila. Owing to a sharp decline in the price of copper in the international market in 1989, mining operations were stopped. However, as of 2021, with price rise in the international market, operations are being revived in the mines.

== Transport ==
Ghatsila and Galudih railway stations are on the Kharagpur-Tatanagar line, which is a part of both Howrah-Nagpur-Mumbai line and Asansol-Tatanagar-Kharagpur line.

== Education ==
Ghatshila CD block had 26 villages with pre-primary schools, 103 villages with primary schools, 41 villages with middle schools, 8 villages with secondary schools, 3 villages with senior secondary schools, 44 villages with no educational facility.
.*Senior secondary schools are also known as Inter colleges in Jharkhand

Ghatshila College was established at Ghatshila in 1961.

== Healthcare ==
Ghatshila CD block had 2 villages with primary health centres, 26 villages with primary health subcentres, 9 villages with maternity and child welfares centre, 3 villages with dispensaries, 6 villages with family welfare centres, 8 villages with medicine shops.
.*Private medical practitioners, alternative medicine etc. not included
