= Chakulia block =

Chakulia
- Community development block
- Coordinates: 22.4785°N 86.7167°E
- Country: India
- State: Jharkhand
- District: East Singhbhum

Government
  - Type: Federal democracy

Area
  - Total: 412.81 km^{2} (159.39 sq mi)

Population (2011)
  - Total: 108,801
  - Density: 263.56/km^{2} (682.62/sq mi)

Languages
  - Official: Hindi, Santali
- Time zone: UTC+5:30 (IST)
- PIN: 832301
- Telephone/STD code: 0657
- Vehicle registration: JH 05
- Literacy: 64.35%
- Lok Sabha constituency: Jamshedpur
- Vidhan Sabha constituency: Baharagora
- Website: jamshedpur.nic.in

Chakulia block is a CD block that forms an administrative division in the Ghatshila subdivision of East Singhbhum district, in the Indian state of Jharkhand.

== History ==
The laying of the foundation stone of the steel plant by Tata Steel (then known as Tata Iron and Steel Company) in 1907 at Sakchi Kalimati in Singhbhum district marked the beginning of the industrialisation of the area. The first police station in the area was opened in 1912 at Jugsalai. The Kalimati Sakchi village was renamed ‘Jamshedpur’ in 1917. Dhalbhum subdivision was created in 1920 with Jamshedpur as headquarters. Jamshedpur Notified Area was established in 1924. East Singhbhum district, with Jamshedpur as headquarters, was set up in 1990.

== Geography ==
Chakulia is located at 22.4785°N 86.7167°E.

“The district forms a part of the Chota Nagpur Plateau and is a hilly upland tract”. The Seraikela Dhalbhumgarh upland and the Dalma range are natural divisions of the district. The main rivers are the Subarnarekha and the Kharkai.

The district consists of two subdivisions - (1) Dhalbhum subdivision with Patamda, Boram, Golmuri-cum-Jugsalai and Potka CD blocks, and (2) Ghatshila subdivision with Ghatshila, Dhalbhumgarh, Musabani, Dumaria, Gurbandha, Chakulia and Baharagora CD blocks.

Chakulia CD block is bounded by the Jamboni CD block in the Jhargram district of the West Bengal state on the north and the east, Baharagora CD block on the south, and the Gurbandha and Dhalbhumgarh CD blocks on the west. Jhargram is a new district, carved out of Paschim Medinipur district, in West Bengal and maps are yet to be updated.

Chakulia CD block has an area of 412.81 km^{2}.Chakulia police station serves Chakulia CD block. The headquarters of Chakulia CD block is located at Chakulia town.

== Demographics ==
=== Population ===
According to the 2011 Census of India, Chakulia CD block had a total population of 108,810, all of which were rural. There were 54,960 (51%) males and 53,850 (49%) females. Population in the age range 0–6 years was 14,610. Scheduled Castes numbered 3,144 (2.89%) and Scheduled Tribes numbered 55,753 (51.24%).

=== Literacy ===
According to the 2011 census, the total number of literate persons in Chakulia CD block was 60,615 (64.35% of the population over 6 years) out of which males numbered 36,310 (76.44% of the male population over 6 years) and females numbered 24,305 (52.05% of the female population over 6 years). The gender disparity (the difference between female and male literacy rates) was 24.39%.

As of 2011 census, literacy in Purbi Singhbhum district was 76.13%. Literacy in Jharkhand was 67.63% in 2011. Literacy in India in 2011 was 74.04%.

See also – List of Jharkhand districts ranked by literacy rate

Literacy in CD Blocks of
Purbi Singhbhum district
Dhalbhum subdivision
Patamda – 59.37%
Boram – 58.02%
Golmuri-cum-Jugsalai – 79.00%
Potka – 64.09%
Ghatshila subdivision
Ghatshila – 70.72%
Musabani – 70.94%
Dumaria – 57.11%
Dhalbhumgarh – 62.75%
Gurbandha – 55.05%
Chakulia – 64.35%
Baharagora – 64.45%
Source: 2011 Census: CD block Wise
Primary Census Abstract Data

== Language and religion ==
Languages of Chakulia CD block (2011)
1. Bengali (51.7%)
2. Santali (33.8%)
3. Mundari (3.21%)
4. Hindi (1.67%)
5. Urdu (7.00%)
6. Others (2.59%)

According to the Population by Mother Tongue 2011 data, in the Chakulia subdistrict, Bengali was the mother-tongue of 69,676 persons forming 51.69% of the population, followed by (number of persons and percentage of population in brackets) Santali (45,431/ 33.31%), Mundari (4,016/ 3.21%), Hindi (2,566/ 2.05%), Urdu (2,087/7.65), Odia (1,011/0.81), and persons with other languages as mother-tongue (331/ 0.26%).

Note: An attempt has been made to include all language groups each with at least 500 persons as their mother-tongue and only those groups with less than 500 persons as their mother-tongue are included in the “other languages” category. Comparatively smaller language groups with 200+ persons as their mother-tongue are mentioned in the text. Many languages have sub-groups. Those who are interested can see the reference for more details.

Hindi is the official language in Jharkhand and Urdu has been declared as an additional official language.

Religion in Chakulia CD block (2011)
Hinduism	54.83%
Sarna	36.80%
Islam	8.06%
Other or not stated	0.31%

According to the Population by Religious Communities 2011 data, in the Chakulia subdistrict, Hindus numbered 74,859 and formed 54.83% of the population, followed by (number of persons and percentage of population in brackets) Other religious communities (47,345/ 36.48%), Muslims (2,582/ 8.06%), Christians (145/ 0.12%), and persons who did not state their religion (185/ 0.15%).

== Economy ==
=== Overview ===
NITI Aayog (National Institution for Transforming India) has released the National Multidimensional Poverty Index (NMPI) baseline report in November 2021. “MPI is calculated using 12 segments - nutrition, child and adolescent mortality, antenatal care, years of schooling, school attendance, cooking fuel, sanitation, drinking water, electricity, housing, assets and bank account, as compared to the previous approach of just considering the poverty line”. Approximately 25.01% population of the country was multidimensionally poor. State-wise Bihar was the poorest with 51.91% of the population being poor, followed by Jharkhand with 42.16% of the population being poor. The silver lining in this scenario is that within Jharkhand, the richest districts are East Singhbhum, Dhanbad, Bokaro, and Ranchi. These districts are having industries and/or mining activity. However, CD blocks still largely dependent on agriculture have remained traditional.

=== Livelihood ===
Livelihood
in Chakulia CD block
1. Cultivators (20.9%)
2. Agricultural labourers (49.4%)
3. Household industries (3.26%)
4. Other Workers (26.4%)

In Chakulia CD block in 2011, amongst the class of total workers, cultivators numbered 12,152 and formed 20.93%, agricultural labourers numbered 28,675 and formed 49.39%, household industry workers numbered 1,890 and formed 3.26% and other workers numbered 15,346 and formed 26.43%. Total workers numbered 58,063 and formed 46.41% of the total population non-workers numbered 67,053 and formed 53.59% of the population.

=== Infrastructure ===
There are 257 inhabited villages in Chakulia CD block. In 2011, 237 villages had power supply. 24 villages had tap water, 252 villages had well water (covered/ uncovered), 241 villages had hand pumps, and all villages have drinking water facility. 24 villages had post offices, 17 villages had sub post offices, 8 villages had telephone (land line), 91 villages had mobile phone coverage. 257 villages had pucca (paved) village roads, 49 villages had bus service (public/ private), 17 villages had autos/ modified autos, 30 villages had taxi/ vans, 46 villages had tractors. 14 village had bank branches, 20 villages had agricultural credit societies, 12 villages had cinema/ video halls, 26 villages had availability of newspapers, 142 villages had ration shops, 101 villages had weekly haat, 143 villages had assembly polling stations.

== Education ==
Chakulia CD block had 15 villages with pre-primary schools, 190 villages with primary schools, 58 villages with middle schools, 7 villages with secondary schools, 1 special school for disabled, 67 villages with no educational facility.
.*Senior secondary schools are also known as Inter colleges in Jharkhand

Shibu Ranjan Khan Memorial Degree College was established at Chakuliya in 2010.

== Healthcare ==
Chakulia CD block had 1 village with primary health centre, 5 villages with primary health subcentres, 1 village with maternity and child welfares centre, 11 villages with medicine shops.
.*Private medical practitioners, alternative medicine etc. not included
