= Dhalbhumgarh block =

Dhalbhumgarh
- Community development block
- Coordinates: 22.5281°N 86.5543°E
- Country: India
- State: Jharkhand
- District: East Singhbhum

Government
  - Type: Federal democracy

Area
  - Total: 176.85 km^{2} (68.28 sq mi)

Population (2011)
  - Total: 61,932
  - Density: 350.20/km^{2} (907.00/sq mi)

Languages
  - Official: Hindi, Santali
- Time zone: UTC+5:30 (IST)
- PIN: 832302
- Telephone/STD code: 0657
- Vehicle registration: JH 05
- Literacy: 62.75%
- Lok Sabha constituency: Jamshedpur
- Vidhan Sabha constituency: Ghatsila
- Website: jamshedpur.nic.in

Dhalbhumgarh block is a CD block that forms an administrative division in the Ghatshila subdivision of East Singhbhum district, in the Indian state of Jharkhand.

== History ==
The laying of the foundation stone of the steel plant by Tata Steel (then known as Tata Iron and Steel Company) in 1907 at Sakchi Kalimati in Singhbhum district marked the beginning of the industrialisation of the area. The first police station in the area was opened in 1912 at Jugsalai. The Kalimati Sakchi village was renamed ‘Jamshedpur’ in 1917. Dhalbhum subdivision was created in 1920 with Jamshedpur as headquarters. Jamshedpur Notified Area was established in 1924. East Singhbhum district, with Jamshedpur as headquarters, was set up in 1990.

== Geography ==
Dhalbhumgarh is located at 22.5281°N 86.5543°E.

“The district forms a part of the Chota Nagpur Plateau and is a hilly upland tract”. The Seraikela Dhalbhumgarh upland and the Dalma range are natural divisions of the district. The main rivers are the Subarnarekha and the Kharkai.

The district consists of two subdivisions - (1) Dhalbhum subdivision with Patamda, Boram, Golmuri-cum-Jugsalai and Potka CD blocks, and (2) Ghatshila subdivision with Ghatshila, Dhalbhumgarh, Musabani, Dumaria, Gurbandha, Chakulia and Baharagora CD blocks.

Dhalbhumgarh CD block is bounded by the Ghatshila CD block and Jamboni CD block in the Jhargram district of the West Bengal state on the north, the Chakulia CD block on the east, the Gurbandha CD block on the south, and the Musabani CD block on the west.

Dhalbhumgarh CD block has an area of 176.85 km^{2}.Dhalbhumgarh police station serves Dhalbhumgarh CD block. The headquarters of Dhalbhumgarh CD block is located at Dhalbhumgarh village.

== Demographics ==
=== Population ===
According to the 2011 Census of India, Dhalbhumgarh CD block had a total population of 61,932, all of which were rural. There were 31,309 (51%) males and 30,623 (49%) females. Population in the age range 0–6 years was 8,588. Scheduled Castes numbered 2,535 (5.57%) and Scheduled Tribes numbered 33,679 (54.38%).

=== Literacy ===
According to the 2011 census, the total number of literate persons in Dhalbhumgarh CD block was 33,474 (62.75% of the population over 6 years) out of which males numbered 19,809 (73.52% of the male population over 6 years) and females numbered 13,665 (51.76% of the female population over 6 years). The gender disparity (the difference between female and male literacy rates) was 21.76%.

As of 2011 census, literacy in Purbi Singhbhum district was 76.13%. Literacy in Jharkhand was 67.63% in 2011. Literacy in India in 2011 was 74.04%.

See also – List of Jharkhand districts ranked by literacy rate

Literacy in CD Blocks of
Purbi Singhbhum district
Dhalbhum subdivision
Patamda – 59.37%
Boram – 58.02%
Golmuri-cum-Jugsalai – 79.00%
Potka – 64.09%
Ghatshila subdivision
Ghatshila – 70.72%
Musabani – 70.94%
Dumaria – 57.11%
Dhalbhumgarh – 62.75%
Gurbandha – 55.05%
Chakulia – 64.35%
Baharagora – 64.45%
Source: 2011 Census: CD block Wise
Primary Census Abstract Data

=== Language ===
Language in Dhalbhumgarh CD block (2011)
1. Bengali (50.6%)
2. Santali (41.0%)
3. Mundari (3.58%)
4. Hindi (2.64%)
5. Others (2.11%)

According to the Population by Mother Tongue 2011 data, in the Dhalbhumgarh subdistrict, Bengali was the mother-tongue of 31,203 persons forming 50.62% of the population, followed by (number of persons and percentage of population in brackets) Santali (25,301/ 41.05%), Hindi (2,206/ 3.58%), Mundari (2,104/ 3.41%), and persons with other languages as mother-tongue (828/ 1.34%). Other languages included 380 persons having Odia as mother-tongue and 296 persons having Urdu as mother-tongue. (Note: A systematic approach has been employed to encompass language groups, each consisting of a minimum of 500 individuals who identify it as their mother tongue. Those groups with fewer than 500 speakers are categorized under "other languages." Additionally, the text recognizes smaller language groups with 200 or more speakers as their mother tongue, acknowledging that many languages may have sub-groups.)

Hindi is the official language in Jharkhand and Urdu has been declared as an additional official language.

=== Religion ===
Religion in Dhalbhumgarh subdistrict
Hinduism	52.76%
Sarna	41.83%
Islam	4.18%
Christianity	0.81%
Other or not stated	0.52%

According to the Population by Religious Communities 2011 data, in the Dhalbhumgarh subdistrict, Hindus numbered 32,673 and formed 52.76% of the population, followed by (number of persons and percentage of population in brackets) Other religious communities (25,956/ 41.91%), Muslims (2,590/ 4.18%), Christians (501/ 0.81%), and persons who did not state their religion (212/ 0.34%).

== Economy ==
=== Overview ===
NITI Aayog (National Institution for Transforming India) has released the National Multidimensional Poverty Index (NMPI) baseline report in November 2021. “MPI is calculated using 12 segments - nutrition, child and adolescent mortality, antenatal care, years of schooling, school attendance, cooking fuel, sanitation, drinking water, electricity, housing, assets and bank account, as compared to the previous approach of just considering the poverty line”. Approximately 25.01% population of the country was multidimensionally poor. State-wise Bihar was the poorest with 51.91% of the population being poor, followed by Jharkhand with 42.16% of the population being poor. The silver lining in this scenario is that within Jharkhand, the richest districts are East Singhbhum, Dhanbad, Bokaro, and Ranchi. These districts are having industries and/or mining activity. However, CD blocks still largely dependent on agriculture have remained traditional.

=== Livelihood ===
Livelihood
in Dhalbhumgarh CD block
1. Cultivators (22.0%)
2. Agricultural labourers (43.5%)
3. Household industries (2.14%)
4. Other Workers (32.4%)

In Dhalbhumgarh CD block in 2011, amongst the class of total workers, cultivators numbered 5,789 and formed 21.96%, agricultural labourers numbered 11,467 and formed 43.50%, household industry workers numbered 563 and formed 2.14% and other workers numbered 8,544 and formed 32.41%. Total workers numbered 26,343 and formed 42.57% of the total population non-workers numbered 35,569 and formed 57.43% of the population.

=== Infrastructure ===
There are 103 inhabited villages in Dhalbhumgarh CD block. In 2011, 92 villages had power supply. 33 villages had tap water, 99 villages had well water (covered/ uncovered), 101 villages had hand pumps, and all villages have drinking water facility. 9 villages had post offices, 3 villages had sub post offices, 12 villages had telephone (land line), 40 villages had mobile phone coverage. 102 villages had pucca (paved) village roads, 17 villages had bus service (public/ private), 6 villages had autos/ modified autos, 3 villages had taxi/ vans, 22 villages had tractors. 8 village had bank branches, 5 villages had agricultural credit societies, 4 villages had cinema/ video halls, 21 villages had availability of newspapers, 52 villages had ration shops, 31 villages had weekly haat, 51 villages had assembly polling stations.

== Education ==
Dhalbhumgarh CD block had 8 villages with pre-primary schools, 83 villages with primary schools, 33 villages with middle schools, 3 villages with secondary schools, 2 villages with senior secondary schools, 20 villages with no educational facility. (Note: Senior secondary schools are also known as Inter colleges in Jharkhand.)

== Healthcare ==
Dhalbhumgarh CD block had 2 villages with primary health centres, 24 villages with primary health subcentres, 6 villages with maternity and child welfares centres, 2 villages with dispensaries, 15 villages with family welfare centres.. (Note: Private medical practitioners, alternative medicine etc. not included.)
