= Musabani block =

Musabani
- Community development block
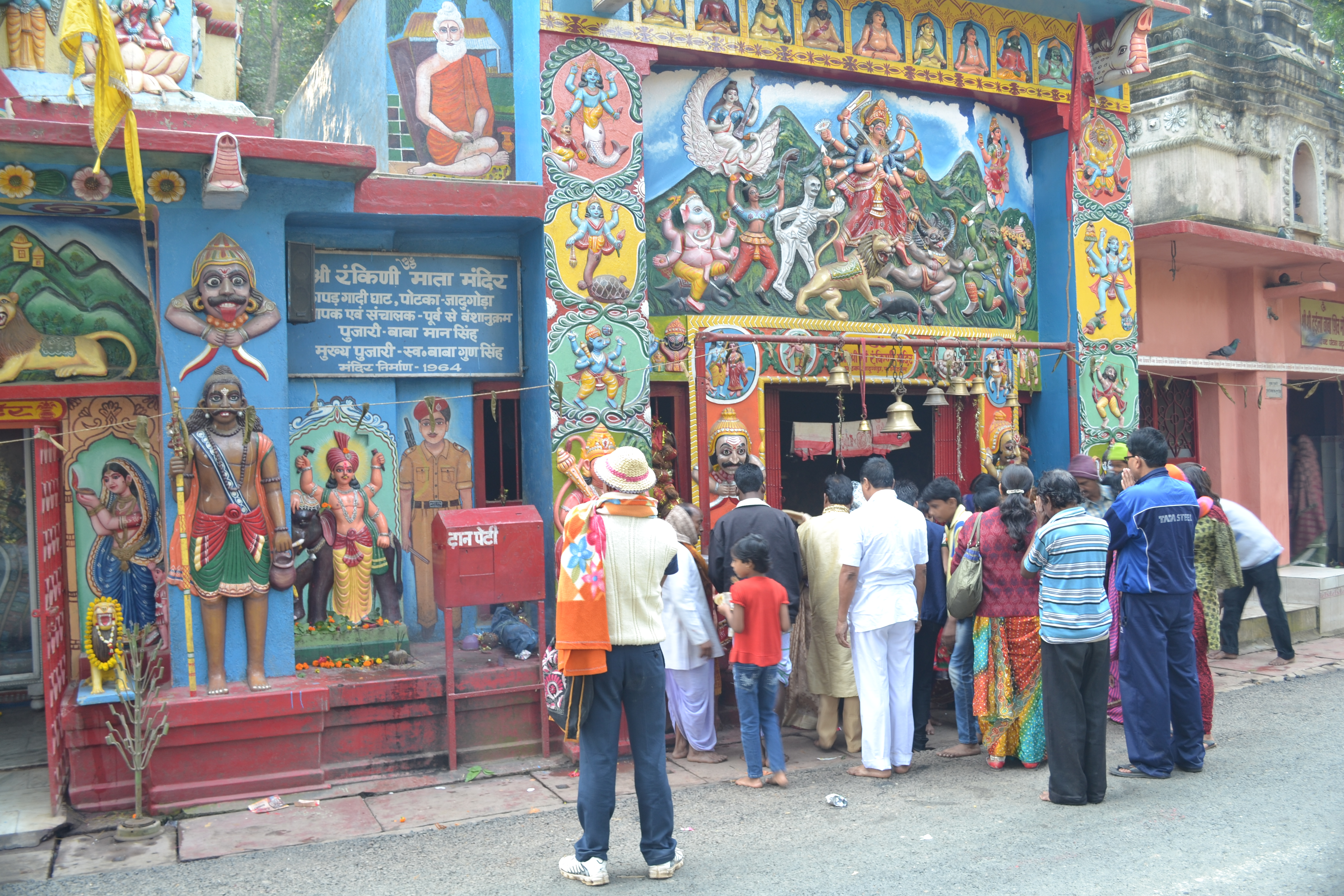
- Rankini temple gate, Jadugora

- Coordinates: 22.52°N 86.45°E
- Country: India
- State: Jharkhand
- District: East Singhbhum

Government
  - Type: Federal democracy

Area
  - Total: 239.00 km^{2} (92.28 sq mi)

Population (2011)
  - Total: 107,084
  - Density: 448.05/km^{2} (1,160.4/sq mi)

Languages
  - Official: Hindi, Santali
- Time zone: UTC+5:30 (IST)
- PIN: 831002
- Telephone/STD code: 0657
- Vehicle registration: JH 05
- Literacy: 70.94%
- Lok Sabha constituency: Jamshedpur
- Vidhan Sabha constituency: Ghatsila, Potka
- Website: jamshedpur.nic.in

Musabani block is a CD block that forms an administrative division in the Ghatshila subdivision of East Singhbhum district, in the Indian state of Jharkhand.

== History ==
The laying of the foundation stone of the steel plant by Tata Steel (then known as Tata Iron and Steel Company) in 1907 at Sakchi Kalimati in Singhbhum district marked the beginning of the industrialisation of the area. The first police station in the area was opened in 1912 at Jugsalai. The Kalimati Sakchi village was renamed ‘Jamshedpur’ in 1917. Dhalbhum subdivision was created in 1920 with Jamshedpur as headquarters. Jamshedpur Notified Area was established in 1924. East Singhbhum district, with Jamshedpur as headquarters, was set up in 1990.

== Geography ==
Musabani is located at 22.52°N 86.45°E.

“The district forms a part of the Chota Nagpur Plateau and is a hilly upland tract”. The Seraikela Dhalbhumgarh upland and the Dalma range are natural divisions of the district. The main rivers are the Subarnarekha and the Kharkai.

The district consists of two subdivisions - (1) Dhalbhum subdivision with Patamda, Boram, Golmuri-cum-Jugsalai and Potka CD blocks, and (2) Ghatshila subdivision with Ghatshila, Dhalbhumgarh, Musabani, Dumaria, Gurbandha, Chakulia and Baharagora CD blocks.

Musabani CD block is bounded by the Ghatshila CD block on the north, the Dhalbhumgarh and Gurbandha CD blocks on the east, the Dumaria CD block on the south, and the Potka CD block on the west.

Musabani CD block has an area of 239.00 km^{2}.Musabani police station serves Musabani CD block. The headquarters of Musabani CD block is located at Musabani town.

=== Population ===
According to the 2011 Census of India, Musabani CD block had a total population of 107,084, of which 57,486 were rural and 49,598 were urban. There were 54,296 (51%) males and 52,828 (49%) females. Population in the age range 0–6 years was 13,945. Scheduled Castes numbered 5,904 (5.51%) and Scheduled Tribes numbered 49,636 (46.35%).
Note: There seems to be a mismatch between the ST and language figures. The figures quoted here are as officially published on the internet. Percentages have been calculated.

Census towns in the Musabani CD block are (2011 population figure in brackets): Jadugora (18,563) and Musabani (31,035).

=== Literacy ===
According to the 2011 census, the total number of literate persons in Musabani CD block was 66,069 (70.94% of the population over 6 years) out of which males numbered 38,219 (81.18% of the male population over 6 years) and females numbered 27,850 (60.47% of the female population over 6 years). The gender disparity (the difference between female and male literacy rates) was 20.71%.

As of 2011 census, literacy in Purbi Singhbhum district was 76.13%. Literacy in Jharkhand was 67.63% in 2011. Literacy in India in 2011 was 74.04%.

See also – List of Jharkhand districts ranked by literacy rate

Literacy in CD Blocks of
Purbi Singhbhum district
Dhalbhum subdivision
Patamda – 59.37%
Boram – 58.02%
Golmuri-cum-Jugsalai – 79.00%
Potka – 64.09%
Ghatshila subdivision
Ghatshila – 70.72%
Musabani – 70.94%
Dumaria – 57.11%
Dhalbhumgarh – 62.75%
Gurbandha – 55.05%
Chakulia – 64.35%
Baharagora – 64.45%
Source: 2011 Census: CD block Wise
Primary Census Abstract Data

== Language and religion ==
Languages in Musabani CD block (2011)
1. Santali (34.1%)
2. Bengali (29.6%)
3. Hindi (9.42%)
4. Urdu (7.35%)
5. Ho (6.19%)
6. Odia (5.36%)
7. Bhojpuri (2.62%)
8. Mundari (1.02%)
9. Others (4.25%)

According to the Population by Mother Tongue 2011 data, in the Musabani subdistrict, Santhali was the mother-tongue of 36,791 persons forming 34.53% of the population, followed by (number of persons and percentage of population in brackets) Bengali (31,755/ 29.80%), Hindi (14,211/ 13.34%), Urdu (7,870/ 7.39%), Odia (5,738/ 5.39%), Ho (6,633/ 6.23%), Mundari (957/ 0.90%), Tamil (539/ 0.51%) and persons with other languages as mother-tongue (20,918/ 1.84%). Other languages included 473 persons having Nepali as mother-tongue,434 persons with Kurukh as mother-tongue, 422 persons having Maithili as mother-tongue, 285 persons having Punjabi as mother tongue, and 217 persons having Malayalam as mother-tongue.

Note: An attempt has been made to include all language groups each with at least 500 persons as their mother-tongue and only those groups with less than 500 persons as their mother-tongue are included in the “other languages” category. Comparatively smaller language groups with 200+ persons as their mother-tongue are mentioned in the text. Many languages have sub-groups. Those who are interested can see the reference for more details.

Hindi is the official language in Jharkhand and Urdu has been declared as an additional official language.

Religion in Musabani CD block (2011)
Hinduism	50.52%
Sarna	38.96%
Islam	8.44%
Christianity	1.55%
Other or not stated	0.53%

According to the Population by Religious Communities 2011 data, in the Musabani subdistrict, Hindus numbered 54,104 and formed 50.52% of the population, followed by (number of persons and percentage of population in brackets) Other religious communities (42,105/ 39.32%), Muslims (9,043/ 8.44%), Christians (1,657/ 1.55%), and persons who did not state their religion (175/ 0.16%).

== Religious demographics ==
=== Estimated Religious Population (2025) ===
Religious population of Musabani (Estimated for 2025)
Colour	Religion	Population (estimated)	Percentage (%)
	Hindu	17,609	46.20
	Muslim	12,540	32.90
	Christian	926	2.43
	Sikh	252	0.66
	Buddhist	69	0.18
	Jain	0	0.00
	Other religions	6,617	17.36
	Religion not stated	99	0.26
	Total	38,115	100.00

=== Official Census Data (2011) ===
Religious population of Musabani town (2011 Census)
Colour	Religion	Population	Percentage (%)
	Hindu	14,333	46.20
	Muslim	10,217	32.90
	Christian	754	2.43
	Sikh	205	0.66
	Buddhist	57	0.18
	Jain	1	0.00
	Other religions	5,388	17.36
	Religion not stated	80	0.26
	Total	31,035	100.00

== Majority Religion-wise Villages in Musabani ==
Religious Majority of Villages – Musabani (Estimated, 2025)
Colour	Religion	Village Name	Estimated Population
	Hindu	Kelabagan	297
	Hindu	1 Number	780
	Hindu	2 Number	813
	Muslim	Badiya	3,987
	Muslim	Mahulbera	3,461
	Muslim	Mohammad Nagar	480
	Sarna / Adivasi	Sonagara	1,309
	Sarna / Adivasi	Surda	1,432
	Sarna / Adivasi	Tilabani	1,440

=== References ===
- "District Census Handbook – East Singhbhum (2011)" (PDF). Census of India, Govt. of India.
- "Village Directory – Jharkhand Census 2011". Registrar General & Census Commissioner, India.

== Economy ==
=== Overview ===
NITI Aayog (National Institution for Transforming India) has released the National Multidimensional Poverty Index (NMPI) baseline report in November 2021. “MPI is calculated using 12 segments - nutrition, child and adolescent mortality, antenatal care, years of schooling, school attendance, cooking fuel, sanitation, drinking water, electricity, housing, assets and bank account, as compared to the previous approach of just considering the poverty line”. Approximately 25.01% population of the country was multidimensionally poor. State-wise Bihar was the poorest with 51.91% of the population being poor, followed by Jharkhand with 42.16% of the population being poor. The silver lining in this scenario is that within Jharkhand, the richest districts are East Singhbhum, Dhanbad, Bokaro, and Ranchi. These districts are having industries and/or mining activity. However, CD blocks still largely dependent on agriculture have remained traditional.

=== Livelihood ===
Livelihood
in Musabani CD block
1. Cultivators (14.6%)
2. Agricultural labourers (31.8%)
3. Household industries (3.19%)
4. Other Workers (50.4%)

In Musabani CD block in 2011, amongst the class of total workers, cultivators numbered 5,736 and formed 28.56%, agricultural labourers numbered 12,460 and formed 31.78%, household industry workers numbered 1,249 and formed 3.19% and other workers numbered 19,761 and formed 50.40%. Total workers numbered 39,206 and formed 36.61% of the total population non-workers numbered 67,878 and formed 63.39% of the population.

=== Infrastructure ===
There are 43 inhabited villages in Musabani CD block. In 2011, 42 villages had power supply. 15 villages had tap water, 40 villages had well water (covered/ uncovered), 42 villages had hand pumps, and all villages have drinking water facility. 4 villages had post offices, 3 villages had sub post offices, 21 villages had telephone (land line), 41 villages had mobile phone coverage. 39 villages had pucca (paved) village roads, 19 villages had bus service (public/ private), 1 village had autos/ modified autos, 4 villages had taxi/ vans, 23 villages had tractors. 7 villages had availability of newspapers, 40 villages had ration shops, 37 villages had weekly haat, 42 villages had assembly polling stations.

== Education ==
Musabani CD block had 42 villages with primary schools, 16 villages with middle schools, 5 villages with secondary schools, 2 villages with senior secondary schools, 1 village with no educational facility.
.*Senior secondary schools are also known as Inter colleges in Jharkhand

== Healthcare ==
Musabani CD block had 1 village with family welfare centre.
.*Private medical practitioners, alternative medicine etc. not included
