= Potka block =

Potka
- Community development block
- Coordinates: 22.6221°N 86.2133°E
- Country: India
- State: Jharkhand
- District: East Singhbhum

Government
  - Type: Federal democracy

Area
  - Total: 592.14 km^{2} (228.63 sq mi)

Population (2011)
  - Total: 199,612
  - Density: 337.10/km^{2} (873.09/sq mi)

Languages
  - Official: Hindi, Santali
- Time zone: UTC+5:30 (IST)
- PIN: 831002
- Telephone/STD code: 0657
- Vehicle registration: JH 05
- Literacy: 64.09%
- Lok Sabha constituency: Jamshedpur
- Vidhan Sabha constituency: Potka
- Website: jamshedpur.nic.in

Potka block is a CD block that forms an administrative division in the Dhalbhum subdivision of East Singhbhum district, in the Indian state of Jharkhand.

== History ==
The laying of the foundation stone of the steel plant by Tata Steel (then known as Tata Iron and Steel Company) in 1907 at Sakchi Kalimati in Singhbhum district marked the beginning of the industrialisation of the area. The first police station in the area was opened in 1912 at Jugsalai. The Kalimati Sakchi village was renamed ‘Jamshedpur’ in 1917. Dhalbhum subdivision was created in 1920 with Jamshedpur as headquarters. Jamshedpur Notified Area was established in 1924. East Singhbhum district, with Jamshedpur as headquarters, was set up in 1990.

== Geography ==
Potka is located at 22.6221°N 86.2133°E.

“The district forms a part of the Chota Nagpur Plateau and is a hilly upland tract”. The Seraikela Dhalbhumgarh upland and the Dalma range are natural divisions of the district. The main rivers are the Subarnarekha and the Kharkai.

The district consists of two subdivisions - (1) Dhalbhum subdivision with Patamda, Boram, Golmuri-cum-Jugsalai and Potka CD blocks, and (2) Ghatshila subdivision with Ghatshila, Dhalbhumgarh, Musabani, Dumaria, Gurbandha, Chakulia and Baharagora CD blocks.

Potka CD block is bounded by the Golmuri-cum-Jugsalai CD block on the north, the Ghatshila, Musabani and Dumaria CD blocks on the east, Tiring and Bahalda CD block/tehsils in the Mayurbahnj district of the Odisha state on the south, and the Gobindpur CD block in the Seraikela Kharsawan district on the west.

Potka CD block has an area of 592.14 km^{2}. Potka police station serves Potka CD block. The headquarters of Potka CD block is located at Potka village.

== Demographics ==
=== Population ===
According to the 2011 Census of India, Potka CD block had a total population of 199,612, of which 189,127 were rural and 10,485 were urban. There were 99,918 (50%) males and 99,694 (50%) females. Population in the age range 0–6 years was 30,391. Scheduled Castes numbered 7,773 (3.89%) and Scheduled Tribes numbered 104,706 (52.45%).
Note: There seems to be a mismatch between the ST and language figures. The figures quoted here are as officially published on the internet. Percentages have been calculated.

The only Census town in the Potka CD block is (2011 population figure in brackets): Haludpukur (10,485).

=== Literacy ===
According to the 2011 census, the total number of literate persons in Potka CD block was 108,462 (64.09% of the population over 6 years) out of which males numbered 64,425 (76.40% of the male population over 6 years) and females numbered 44,037 (51.87% of the female population over 6 years). The gender disparity (the difference between female and male literacy rates) was 24.53%.

As of 2011 census, literacy in Purbi Singhbhum district was 76.13%. Literacy in Jharkhand was 67.63% in 2011. Literacy in India in 2011 was 74.04%.

See also – List of Jharkhand districts ranked by literacy rate

Literacy in CD Blocks of
Purbi Singhbhum district
Dhalbhum subdivision
Patamda – 59.37%
Boram – 58.02%
Golmuri-cum-Jugsalai – 79.00%
Potka – 64.09%
Ghatshila subdivision
Ghatshila – 70.72%
Musabani – 70.94%
Dumaria – 57.11%
Dhalbhumgarh – 62.75%
Gurbandha – 55.05%
Chakulia – 64.35%
Baharagora – 64.45%
Source: 2011 Census: CD block Wise
Primary Census Abstract Data

== Language and religion ==
Languages in Potka CD block (2011) (Note: An attempt has been made to include all language groups each with at least 500 persons as their mother-tongue and only those groups with less than 500 persons as their mother-tongue are included in the “other languages” category. Comparatively smaller language groups with 200+ persons as their mother-tongue are mentioned in the text. Many languages have sub-groups. Those who are interested can see the reference for more details.)
1. Bengali (45.4%)
2. Santali (26.0%)
3. Mundari (10.7%)
4. Odia (7.12%)
5. Urdu (2.87%)
6. Bhumij (2.70%)
7. Ho (1.78%)
8. Hindi (1.46%)
9. Others (1.96%)

According to the Population by Mother Tongue 2011 data, in the Potka subdistrict, Bengali was the mother-tongue of 90,722 persons forming 45.41% of the population, followed by (number of persons and percentage of population in brackets) Santali (52,011/ 26.02%), Mundari (20,918/ 10.46%), Odia (14,209/ 7.11%), Urdu (5,738/ 2.87%), Bhumij (5,693/ 2.85), Hindi (5,178/ 2.59%), Ho (3,557/ 1.78%), Kharia (978/ 0.49%) and persons with other languages as mother-tongue (855/ 0.43%). Other languages included 419 persons having Munda as mother-tongue.

Hindi is the official language in Jharkhand and Urdu has been declared as an additional official language.

Religion in Potka CD block (2011)
Hinduism	54.43%
Sarna	42.12%
Islam	3.11%
Other or not stated	0.34%

According to the Population by Religious Communities 2011 data, in the Potka subdistrict, Hindus numbered 108,657 and formed 54.43% of the population, followed by (number of persons and percentage of population in brackets) Other religious communities (84,119/ 42.14%), Muslims (6,202/ 3.11%), Christians (377/ 0.19%), and persons who did not state their religion (257/ 0.13%).

== Economy ==
=== Overview ===
NITI Aayog (National Institution for Transforming India) has released the National Multidimensional Poverty Index (NMPI) baseline report in November 2021. “MPI is calculated using 12 segments - nutrition, child and adolescent mortality, antenatal care, years of schooling, school attendance, cooking fuel, sanitation, drinking water, electricity, housing, assets and bank account, as compared to the previous approach of just considering the poverty line”. Approximately 25.01% population of the country was multidimensionally poor. State-wise Bihar was the poorest with 51.91% of the population being poor, followed by Jharkhand with 42.16% of the population being poor. The silver lining in this scenario is that within Jharkhand, the richest districts are East Singhbhum, Dhanbad, Bokaro, and Ranchi. These districts are having industries and/or mining activity. However, CD blocks still largely dependent on agriculture have remained traditional.

=== Livelihood ===
Livelihood
in Potka CD block
1. Cultivators (28.6%)
2. Agricultural labourers (39.1%)
3. Household industries (2.78%)
4. Other Workers (29.5%)

In Potka CD block in 2011, amongst the class of total workers, cultivators numbered 22,526 and formed 28.56%, agricultural labourers numbered 30,858 and formed 39.12%, household industry workers numbered 2,192 and formed 2.78% and other workers numbered 23,304 and formed 29.54%. Total workers numbered 78,880 and formed 39.52% of the total population non-workers numbered 120,732 and formed 60.48% of the population.

=== Infrastructure ===
There are 283 inhabited villages in Potka CD block. In 2011, 252 villages had power supply. 57 villages had tap water, 273 villages had well water (covered/ uncovered), 253 villages had hand pumps, and 1 village did not have drinking water facility. 46 villages had post offices, 35 villages had sub post offices, 32 villages had telephone (land line), 94 villages had mobile phone coverage. 280 villages had pucca (paved) village roads, 48 villages had bus service (public/ private), 8 villages had autos/ modified autos, 10 villages had taxi/ vans, 87 villages had tractors. 27 villages had bank branches, 24 villages had agricultural credit societies, 8 villages had cinema/ video halls, 25 villages had availability of newspapers, 178 villages had ration shops, 130 villages had weekly haat, 175 villages had assembly polling stations.

== Education ==
Potka CD block had 11 villages with pre-primary schools, 247 villages with primary schools, 89 villages with middle schools, 14 villages with secondary schools, 2 villages with senior secondary schools, 36 villages with no educational facility.
.*Senior secondary schools are also known as Inter colleges in Jharkhand

== Healthcare ==
Potka CD block had 3 villages with primary health centres, 29 villages with primary health subcentres, 2 villages with maternity and child welfares centre, 4 villages with dispensaries, 3 villages with family welfare centres, 18 villages with medicine shops.
.*Private medical practitioners, alternative medicine etc. not included,

== Notable people ==
- Amulya Sardar - Ex-MLA, Potka, Jharkhand
- Hari Ram Sardar - Ex-MLA, Potka, Bihar
- Maneka Sardar - Three-term Ex-MLA, Potka, Jharkhand
- Sanatan Sardar - Ex-Irrigation Minister, Bihar and three-term Ex-MLA, Potka, Bihar
- Sanjib Sardar - MLA Potka, Jharkhand
