= Patamda block =

Patamda
- Community development block
- Coordinates: 22.9152°N 86.3858°E
- Country: India
- State: Jharkhand
- District: East Singhbhum

Government
  - Type: Federal democracy

Area
  - Total: 267.03 km^{2} (103.10 sq mi)

Population (2011)
  - Total: 82,876
  - Density: 310.36/km^{2} (803.83/sq mi)

Languages
  - Official: Hindi
- Time zone: UTC+5:30 (IST)
- PIN: 832105
- Telephone/STD code: 0657
- Vehicle registration: JH 05
- Literacy: 59.37%
- Lok Sabha constituency: Jamshedpur
- Vidhan Sabha constituency: Jugsalai
- Website: jamshedpur.nic.in

Patamda block is a CD block that forms an administrative division in the Dhalbhum subdivision of East Singhbhum district, in the Indian state of Jharkhand.

== History ==
The laying of the foundation stone of the steel plant by Tata Steel (then known as Tata Iron and Steel Company) in 1907 at Sakchi Kalimati in Singhbhum district marked the beginning of the industrialisation of the area. The first police station in the area was opened in 1912 at Jugsalai. The Kalimati Sakchi village was renamed ‘Jamshedpur’ in 1917. Dhalbhum subdivision was created in 1920 with Jamshedpur as headquarters. Jamshedpur Notified Area was established in 1924. However until the Bihar and West Bengal (Transfer of Territories) Act', 1956 the Patamda areas was part of Manbhum district of Bihar, thereafter it became part of Dhalbhum. East Singhbhum district, with Jamshedpur as headquarters, was set up in 1990.

== Geography ==
Patamda is located at 22.9152°N 86.3858°E.

“The district forms a part of the Chota Nagpur Plateau and is a hilly upland tract”. The Seraikela Dhalbhumgarh upland and the Dalma range are natural divisions of the district. The main rivers are the Subarnarekha and the Kharkai.

The district consists of two subdivisions - (1) Dhalbhum subdivision with Patamda, Boram, Golmuri-cum-Jugsalai and Potka CD blocks, and (2) Ghatshila subdivision with Ghatshila, Dhalbhumgarh, Musabani, Dumaria, Gurbandha, Chakulia and Baharagora CD blocks.

Patamda CD block is bounded by the Barabazar CD block in the Purulia district of the West Bengal state on the north, the Manbazar II and Bandwan CD blocks in the Purulia district on the east, the Golmuri-cum-Jugsalai CD block on the south, and the Boram CD block on the west.

Patamda CD block has an area of 267.03 km^{2}.Patamda police station serves Patamda CD block. The headquarters of Patamda CD block is located at Patamda village.

== Demographics ==
=== Population ===
According to the 2011 Census of India, Patamda CD block had a total population of 82,876, all of which were rural. There were 41,751 (50%) males and 41,125 (50%) females. Population in the age range 0–6 years was 12,245. Scheduled Castes numbered 4,847 (5.85%) and Scheduled Tribes numbered 33,101 (39.94%).
Note: There seems to be a mismatch between the ST and language figures. The figures quoted here are as officially published on the internet. Percentages have been calculated.

=== Literacy ===
According to the 2011 census, the total number of literate persons in Patamda CD block was 41,933 (59.37% of the population over 6 years) out of which males numbered 26,156 (73.72% of the male population over 6 years) and females numbered 15,777 (44.89% of the female population over 6 years). The gender disparity (the difference between female and male literacy rates) was 28.83%.

As of 2011 census, literacy in Purbi Singhbhum district was 76.13%. Literacy in Jharkhand was 67.63% in 2011. Literacy in India in 2011 was 74.04%.

See also – List of Jharkhand districts ranked by literacy rate

Literacy in CD Blocks of
Purbi Singhbhum district
Dhalbhum subdivision
Patamda – 59.37%
Boram – 58.02%
Golmuri-cum-Jugsalai – 79.00%
Potka – 64.09%
Ghatshila subdivision
Ghatshila – 70.72%
Musabani – 70.94%
Dumaria – 57.11%
Dhalbhumgarh – 62.75%
Gurbandha – 55.05%
Chakulia – 64.35%
Baharagora – 64.45%
Source: 2011 Census: CD block Wise
Primary Census Abstract Data

=== Language and religion ===
Languages of Patamda CD block (2011)
1. Bengali (79.8%)
2. Santali (19.1%)
3. Others (1.12%)

According to the Population by Mother Tongue 2011 data, in the Patamda subdistrict, Bengali was the mother-tongue of 66,106 persons forming 79.76% of the population, followed by (number of persons and percentage of population in brackets) Santali (15,845/19.12%), Hindi (513 / 0.62%), and persons with other languages as mother-tongue (412/ 0.05%).
Note: An attempt has been made to include all language groups each with at least 500 persons as their mother-tongue and only those groups with less than 500 persons as their mother-tongue are included in the “other languages” category. Comparatively smaller language groups with 200+ persons as their mother-tongue are mentioned in the text. Many languages have sub-groups. Those who are interested can see the reference for more details.

Hindi is the official language in Jharkhand and Urdu has been declared as an additional official language.

Religion in Patamda CD block (2011)
| Hinduism | 77.19% |
| Sarna | 21.10% |
| Islam | 1.01% |
| Other or religion not stated | 0.70% |

According to the Population by Religious Communities 2011 data, in the Patamda subdistrict, Hindus numbered 63,972 and formed 77.19% of the population, followed by (number of persons and percentage of population in brackets) Other religious communities/Sarna (17,488/ 21.10%), Muslims (838/1.01%), Christians (149/ 0.18%), and persons who did not state their religion (429/ 0.52%).

== Economy ==
=== Overview ===
NITI Aayog (National Institution for Transforming India) has released the National Multidimensional Poverty Index (NMPI) baseline report in November 2021. “MPI is calculated using 12 segments - nutrition, child and adolescent mortality, antenatal care, years of schooling, school attendance, cooking fuel, sanitation, drinking water, electricity, housing, assets and bank account, as compared to the previous approach of just considering the poverty line”. Approximately 25.01% population of the country was multidimensionally poor. State-wise Bihar was the poorest with 51.91% of the population being poor, followed by Jharkhand with 42.16% of the population being poor. The silver lining in this scenario is that within Jharkhand, the richest districts are East Singhbhum, Dhanbad, Bokaro, and Ranchi. These districts are having industries and/or mining activity. However, CD blocks still largely dependent on agriculture have remained traditional.

=== Livelihood ===
Livelihood
in Patamda CD block
1. Cultivators (30.7%)
2. Agricultural labourers (45.6%)
3. Household industries (2.62%)
4. Other Workers (21.1%)

In Patamda CD block in 2011, amongst the class of total workers, cultivators numbered 12,882 and formed 30.66%, agricultural labourers numbered 19,169 and formed 45.62%, household industry workers numbered 1,099 and formed 2.62% and other workers numbered 8,868 and formed 21.11%. Total workers numbered 42,018 and formed 50.70% of the total population non-workers numbered 40,858 and formed 49.30% of the population.

=== Infrastructure ===
There are 84 inhabited villages in Patamda CD block. In 2011, 72 villages had power supply. 14 villages had tap water, 81 villages had well water (covered/ uncovered), 84 villages had hand pumps, and all villages have drinking water facility. 14 villages had post offices, 20 villages had sub post offices, 2 villages had telephone (land line), 43 villages had mobile phone coverage. 84 villages had pucca (paved) village roads, 25 villages had bus service (public/ private), 3 villages had autos/ modified autos, 6 villages had taxi/ vans, 11 villages had tractors. 4 villages had bank branches, 1 village had agricultural credit society, 24 villages had availability of newspapers, 50 villages had ration shops, 41 villages had weekly haat, 66 villages had assembly polling stations.

== Education ==
Patamda CD block had 11 villages with pre-primary schools, 82 villages with primary schools, 30 villages with middle schools, 10 villages with secondary schools, 2 villages with senior secondary schools, 2 villages with no educational facility.
.*Senior secondary schools are also known as Inter colleges in Jharkhand

Patamda Degree College was established in 1993 at Patamda.

== Healthcare ==
Patamda CD block had 11 villages with primary health subcentres, 10 villages with maternity and child welfare centres, 2 villages with allopathic hospitals, 1 village with dispensary, 9 villages with medicine shops.
.*Private medical practitioners, alternative medicine etc. not included
