= Boram block =

Boram
- Community development block
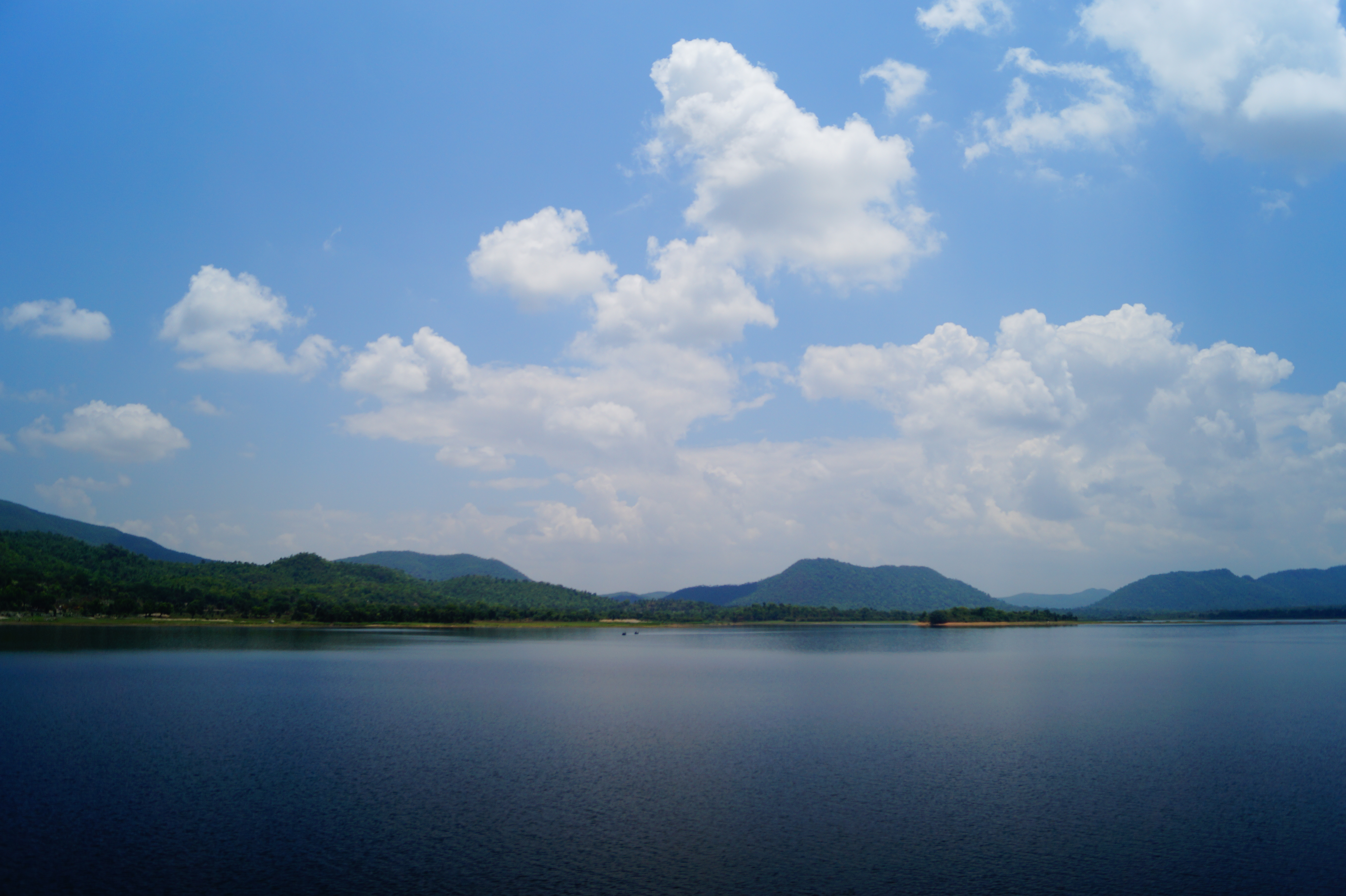
- Dimna Lake in Boram block - Dalma Hills in the background

- Coordinates: 22.9568°N 86.2844°E
- Country: India
- State: Jharkhand
- District: East Singhbhum

Government
  - Type: Federal democracy

Area
  - Total: 244.41 km^{2} (94.37 sq mi)

Population (2011)
  - Total: 69,013
  - Density: 282.37/km^{2} (731.32/sq mi)

Languages
  - Official: Hindi, Urdu
- Time zone: UTC+5:30 (IST)
- PIN: 832112
- Telephone/STD code: 0657
- Vehicle registration: JH 05
- Literacy: 58.02%
- Lok Sabha constituency: Jamshedpur
- Vidhan Sabha constituency: Jugsalai
- Website: jamshedpur.nic.in

Boram block is a CD block that forms an administrative division in the Dhalbhum subdivision of East Singhbhum district, in the Indian state of Jharkhand.

== History ==
The laying of the foundation stone of the steel plant by Tata Steel (then known as Tata Iron and Steel Company) in 1907 at Sakchi Kalimati in Singhbhum district marked the beginning of the industrialisation of the area. The first police station in the area was opened in 1912 at Jugsalai. The Kalimati Sakchi village was renamed ‘Jamshedpur’ in 1917. Dhalbhum subdivision was created in 1920 with Jamshedpur as headquarters. Jamshedpur Notified Area was established in 1924. East Singhbhum district, with Jamshedpur as headquarters, was set up in 1990.

== Geography ==
Boram is located at 22.9568°N 86.2844°E.

“The district forms a part of the Chota Nagpur Plateau and is a hilly upland tract”. The Seraikela Dhalbhumgarh upland and the Dalma range are natural divisions of the district. The main rivers are the Subarnarekha and the Kharkai.

The district consists of two subdivisions - (1) Dhalbhum subdivision with Patamda, Boram, Golmuri-cum-Jugsalai and Potka CD blocks, and (2) Ghatshila subdivision with Ghatshila, Dhalbhumgarh, Musabani, Dumaria, Gurbandha, Chakulia and Baharagora CD blocks.

Dimna Lake was constructed by Tata Steel in Boram block.

Boram CD block is bounded by the Barabazar CD block in the Purulia district of the West Bengal state on the north, the Patamda CD block on the east, the Golmuri-cum-Jugsalai CD block on the south, and the Nimdih CD block in Seraikela Kharswan district on the west.

Boram CD block has an area of 244.41 km^{2}.Boram police station serves Boram CD block. The headquarters of Boram CD block is located at Boram village.

== Demographics ==
=== Population ===
According to the 2011 Census of India, Boram CD block had a total population of 69,013, all of which were rural. There were 35,142 (51%) males and 33,871 (49%) females. Population in the age range 0–6 years was 10,510. Scheduled Castes numbered 3,250 (4.71%) and Scheduled Tribes numbered 29,147 (42.23%).
Note: There seems to be a mismatch between the ST and language figures. The figures quoted here are as officially published on the internet. Percentages have been calculated.

=== Literacy ===
According to the 2011 census, the total number of literate persons in Boram CD block was 33,943 (58.02% of the population over 6 years) out of which males numbered 21,559 (72.45% of the male population over 6 years) and females numbered 12,384 (43.08% of the female population over 6 years). The gender disparity (the difference between female and male literacy rates) was 29.37%.

As of 2011 census, literacy in Purbi Singhbhum district was 76.13%. Literacy in Jharkhand was 67.63% in 2011. Literacy in India in 2011 was 74.04%.

See also – List of Jharkhand districts ranked by literacy rate

Literacy in CD Blocks of
Purbi Singhbhum district
Dhalbhum subdivision
Patamda – 59.37%
Boram – 58.02%
Golmuri-cum-Jugsalai – 79.00%
Potka – 64.09%
Ghatshila subdivision
Ghatshila – 70.72%
Musabani – 70.94%
Dumaria – 57.11%
Dhalbhumgarh – 62.75%
Gurbandha – 55.05%
Chakulia – 64.35%
Baharagora – 64.45%
Source: 2011 Census: CD block Wise
Primary Census Abstract Data

=== Language and religion ===
Language in Boram CD block (2011)
1. Bengali (78.4%)
2. Santali (18.2%)
3. Karmali (1.23%)
4. Other languages (2.23%)

According to the Population by Mother Tongue 2011 data, in the Boram subdistrict, Bengali was the mother-tongue of 54,025 persons forming 78.38% of the population, followed by (number of persons and percentage of population in brackets) Santali (13,329/19.34%), Hindi (845 / 1.23%), and persons with other languages as mother-tongue (730/ 0.05%). Other languages include Kharia with 370 speakers.
Note: An attempt has been made to include all language groups each with at least 500 persons as their mother-tongue and only those groups with less than 500 persons as their mother-tongue are included in the “other languages” category. Comparatively smaller language groups with 200+ persons as their mother-tongue are mentioned in the text. Many languages have sub-groups. Those who are interested can see the reference for more details.

Hindi is the official language in Jharkhand and Urdu has been declared as an additional official language.

Religion in Boram CD block (2011)
Hinduism	76.23%
Sarna	22.42%
Islam	1.00%
Other or not stated	0.35%

According to the Population by Religious Communities 2011 data, in the Boram subdistrict, Hindus numbered 52,608 and formed 76.23% of the population, followed by (number of persons and percentage of population in brackets) Other religious communities (15,486/ 22.44%), Muslims (690/ 1.00%), Christians (49/ 0.07%), and persons who did not state their religion (180/ 0.26%).

== Economy ==
=== Overview ===
NITI Aayog (National Institution for Transforming India) has released the National Multidimensional Poverty Index (NMPI) baseline report in November 2021. “MPI is calculated using 12 segments - nutrition, child and adolescent mortality, antenatal care, years of schooling, school attendance, cooking fuel, sanitation, drinking water, electricity, housing, assets and bank account, as compared to the previous approach of just considering the poverty line”. Approximately 25.01% population of the country was multidimensionally poor. State-wise Bihar was the poorest with 51.91% of the population being poor, followed by Jharkhand with 42.16% of the population being poor. The silver lining in this scenario is that within Jharkhand, the richest districts are East Singhbhum, Dhanbad, Bokaro, and Ranchi. These districts are having industries and/or mining activity. However, CD blocks still largely dependent on agriculture have remained traditional.

=== Livelihood ===
Livelihood
in Boram CD block
1. Cultivators (32.2%)
2. Agricultural labourers (38.6%)
3. Household industries (2.64%)
4. Other Workers (26.6%)

In Boram CD block in 2011, amongst the class of total workers, cultivators numbered 10,644 and formed 32.24%, agricultural labourers numbered 12,733 and formed 38.56%, household industry workers numbered 872 and formed 2.64% and other workers numbered 8,770 and formed 26.56%. Total workers numbered 33,019 and formed 47.84% of the total population Non-workers numbered 35,944 and formed 52.16% of the population.

=== Infrastructure ===
There are 73 inhabited villages in Boram CD block. In 2011, 61 villages had power supply. 2 villages had tap water, 73 villages had well water (covered/ uncovered), 73 villages had hand pumps, and all villages have drinking water facility. 12 villages had post offices, 9 villages had sub post offices, 39 villages had mobile phone coverage. 73 villages had pucca (paved) village roads, 28 villages had bus service (public/ private), 4 villages had taxi/ vans, 9 villages had tractors. 2 villages had bank branches, x village had agricultural credit society, 1 village had cinema/ video hall, 12 villages had availability of newspapers, 44 villages had ration shops, 30 villages had weekly haat, 56 villages had assembly polling stations.

== Education ==
Boram CD block had 1 village with pre-primary school, 70 villages with primary schools, 32=villages with middle schools, 3 villages with secondary schools, 3 villages with no educational facility.
.*Senior secondary schools are also known as Inter colleges in Jharkhand

== Healthcare ==
Boram CD block had 1 village with primary health centre, 8 villages with primary health subcentres, 1 village with maternity and child welfare centre, 1 village with dispensary, 1 village with family welfare centre, 1 village with medicine shop.
.*Private medical practitioners, alternative medicine etc. not included
