= Dumaria block =

Dumaria
- Community development block
- Coordinates: 22.4636°N 86.4387°E
- Country: India
- State: Jharkhand
- District: East Singhbhum

Government
  - Type: Federal democracy

Area
  - Total: 316.74 km^{2} (122.29 sq mi)

Population (2011)
  - Total: 62,128
  - Density: 196.15/km^{2} (508.02/sq mi)

Languages
  - Official: Hindi, Santali
- Time zone: UTC+5:30 (IST)
- PIN: 832104
- Telephone/STD code: 0657
- Vehicle registration: JH 05
- Literacy: 57.11%
- Lok Sabha constituency: Jamshedpur
- Vidhan Sabha constituency: Potka
- Website: jamshedpur.nic.in

Dumaria block (also spelled Dumriya) is a CD block that forms an administrative division in the Ghatshila subdivision of East Singhbhum district, in the Indian state of Jharkhand.

== History ==
The laying of the foundation stone of the steel plant by Tata Steel (then known as Tata Iron and Steel Company) in 1907 at Sakchi Kalimati in Singhbhum district marked the beginning of the industrialisation of the area. The first police station in the area was opened in 1912 at Jugsalai. The Kalimati Sakchi village was renamed ‘Jamshedpur’ in 1917. Dhalbhum subdivision was created in 1920 with Jamshedpur as headquarters. Jamshedpur Notified Area was established in 1924. East Singhbhum district, with Jamshedpur as headquarters, was set up in 1990.

== Geography ==
Dumaria is located at 22.4636°N 86.4387°E.

“The district forms a part of the Chota Nagpur Plateau and is a hilly upland tract”. The Seraikela Dhalbhumgarh upland and the Dalma range are natural divisions of the district. The main rivers are the Subarnarekha and the Kharkai.

The district consists of two subdivisions - (1) Dhalbhum subdivision with Patamda, Boram, Golmuri-cum-Jugsalai and Potka CD blocks, and (2) Ghatshila subdivision with Ghatshila, Dhalbhumgarh, Musabani, Dumaria, Gurbandha, Chakulia and Baharagora CD blocks.

Dumaria CD block is bounded by the Musabani CD block on the north, Gurbandha CD block on the east, the Rajrangpur and Bijatola CD blocks/ tehsils in the Mayurbhanj district of the Odisha state on the south, and the Potka CD block on the west.

Dumaria CD block has an area of 316.74 km^{2}.Dumaria police station serves Dumaria CD block. The headquarters of Dumaria CD block is located at Dumaria village.

== Demographics ==
=== Population ===
According to the 2011 Census of India, Dumaria CD block had a total population of 62,128, all of which were rural. There were 31,043 (50%) males and 31,085 (50%) females. Population in the age range 0–6 years was 9,876. Scheduled Castes numbered 3,460 (5.57%) and Scheduled Tribes numbered 44,658 (71.88%).

=== Literacy ===
According to the 2011 census, the total number of literate persons in Dumaria CD block was 29,840 (57.11% of the population over 6 years) out of which males numbered 18,137 (69.89% of the male population over 6 years) and females numbered 11,703 (44.50% of the female population over 6 years). The gender disparity (the difference between female and male literacy rates) was 25.39%.

As of 2011 census, literacy in Purbi Singhbhum district was 76.13%. Literacy in Jharkhand was 67.63% in 2011. Literacy in India in 2011 was 74.04%.

See also – List of Jharkhand districts ranked by literacy rate

Literacy in CD Blocks of
Purbi Singhbhum district
Dhalbhum subdivision
Patamda – 59.37%
Boram – 58.02%
Golmuri-cum-Jugsalai – 79.00%
Potka – 64.09%
Ghatshila subdivision
Ghatshila – 70.72%
Musabani – 70.94%
Dumaria – 57.11%
Dhalbhumgarh – 62.75%
Gurbandha – 55.05%
Chakulia – 64.35%
Baharagora – 64.45%
Source: 2011 Census: CD block Wise
Primary Census Abstract Data

== Language and religion ==
Languages in Dumaria CD block (2011)
1. Santali (47.3%)
2. Bengali (22.0%)
3. Ho (13.5%)
4. Odia (11.0%)
5. Mundari (2.79%)
6. Kharia (1.65%)
7. Others (1.77%)

According to the Population by Mother Tongue 2011 data, in the Dumaria subdistrict, Santhali was the mother-tongue of 29,880 persons forming 48.09% of the population, followed by (number of persons and percentage of population in brackets) Bengali (13,697/ 21.98%), Ho (8,382/ 13.49%), Odia (6,848/ 11.02%), Mundari (1,547/ 2.49%), Kharia (1,027/ 1.65), Hindi (494/ 0.80%), and persons with other languages as mother-tongue (297/ 0.43%).

Note: An attempt has been made to include all language groups each with at least 500 persons as their mother-tongue and only those groups with less than 500 persons as their mother-tongue are included in the “other languages” category. Comparatively smaller language groups with 200+ persons as their mother-tongue are mentioned in the text. Many languages have sub-groups. Those who are interested can see the reference for more details.

Hindi is the official language in Jharkhand and Urdu has been declared as an additional official language.

Religion in Dumaria CD block (2011)
Sarna	63.36%
Hinduism	34.52%
Islam	1.63%
Other or not stated	0.35%

According to the Population by Religious Communities 2011 data, in the Dumaria subdistrict, “Other religious communities” numbered 39,367 and formed 63.36% of the population, followed by (number of persons and percentage of population in brackets) Hindus (21,444/ 34.52%), Muslims (1,010/ 1.63%), Christians (240/ 0.39%), and persons who did not state their religion (67/ 0.11%).

== Economy ==
=== Overview ===
NITI Aayog (National Institution for Transforming India) has released the National Multidimensional Poverty Index (NMPI) baseline report in November 2021. “MPI is calculated using 12 segments - nutrition, child and adolescent mortality, antenatal care, years of schooling, school attendance, cooking fuel, sanitation, drinking water, electricity, housing, assets and bank account, as compared to the previous approach of just considering the poverty line”. Approximately 25.01% population of the country was multidimensionally poor. State-wise Bihar was the poorest with 51.91% of the population being poor, followed by Jharkhand with 42.16% of the population being poor. The silver lining in this scenario is that within Jharkhand, the richest districts are East Singhbhum, Dhanbad, Bokaro, and Ranchi. These districts are having industries and/or mining activity. However, CD blocks still largely dependent on agriculture have remained traditional.

=== Livelihood ===
Livelihood
in Dumaria CD block
1. Cultivators (31.3%)
2. Agricultural labourers (53.0%)
3. Household industries (2.92%)
4. Other Workers (12.8%)

In Dumaria CD block in 2011, amongst the class of total workers, cultivators numbered 9,301 and formed 31.26%, agricultural labourers numbered 15,773 and formed 53.02%, household industry workers numbered 869 and formed 2.92% and other workers numbered 3,808 and formed 12.80%. Total workers numbered 29,751 and formed 47.89% of the total population non-workers numbered 32,377 and formed 52.11% of the population.

=== Infrastructure ===
There are 100 inhabited villages in Dumaria CD block. In 2011, 27 villages had power supply. x villages had tap water, 89 villages had well water (covered/ uncovered), 85 villages had hand pumps, and all villages have drinking water facility. 1 village had post office, 1 village had sub post office, 1 village had telephone (land line), 74 villages had mobile phone coverage. 83 villages had pucca (paved) village roads, 5 villages had bus service (public/ private), 1 village had autos/ modified autos, 1 village had taxi/ van, 44 villages had tractors. 1 village had bank branches, 16 villages had agricultural credit societies, 13 villages had availability of newspapers, 52 villages had ration shops, 19 villages had weekly haat, 61 villages had assembly polling stations.

== Education ==
Dumaria CD block had 5 villages with pre-primary schools, 87 villages with primary schools, 30 villages with middle schools, 3 villages with secondary schools, 2 villages with senior secondary schools, 3 villages with no educational facility.
.*Senior secondary schools are also known as Inter colleges in Jharkhand

== Healthcare ==
Dumaria CD block had 4 villages with primary health subcentres, 1 village with maternity and child welfares centre, 1 village with allopathic hospital, 2 villages with dispensaries, 1 village with family welfare centre, 2 villages with medicine shops.
.*Private medical practitioners, alternative medicine etc. not included
