= Dhalbhumgarh =

- Village
- Rasmancha in Dhalbhum Rajpalace

- Location in Jharkhand, India Dhalbhumgarh (India)
- Coordinates: 22.5161°N 86.5543°E
- Country: India
- State: Jharkhand
- District: East Singhbhum

Government
  - Type: Federal democracy

Languages *
  - Official: Hindi, Santali
- Time zone: UTC+5:30 (IST)
- PIN: 832302
- Telephone/ STD code: 0657
- Vehicle registration: JH 05
- Lok Sabha constituency: Jamshedpur
- Vidhan Sabha constituency: Ghatsila
- Website: jamshedpur.nic.in

Dhalbhumargh is a village in the Dhalbhumgarh CD block in the Ghatshila subdivision of the East Singhbhum District in the Indian state of Jharkhand.

== History ==
The Dhal Clan is traditionally identified as a Chandravanshi (Lunar dynasty) Kshatriya lineage, with ancestral origins associated with the ancient Kalachuris of Dahala in Central India. During the reign of Anangabhima Deva III (1211–1238 CE) of the Eastern Ganga dynasty of Odisha, the Gajapati kingdom expanded its political influence through military campaigns in neighbouring territories. According to Dhal clan traditions, following the defeat of the Kalachuris, four brothers belonging to the Kalachuri lineage established relations with Anangabhima Deva III and travelled to Jagannath Puri, where they were received as honoured guests at his royal palace Barabati fort. They were subsequently granted the responsibility of administering and governing different territories under the patronage of the Gajapati ruler. According to clan traditions, Anangabhima Deva III also supported the brothers in their military expedition to conquer the Dhalbhum region. During this campaign, the Dhal warriors are said to have defeated Chintamoni Dhoba, a local ruler associated with the region, and established their authority over the territory. The conquered region subsequently came to be known as Dhalbhum, a name traditionally associated with the Dhal lineage and its rule. The Dhal clan traditions further associate this conquest with the establishment of their political authority in territories across present-day Odisha and Jharkhand.

Dhalbhum was first written about when the British Army attacked the Dhalbhum and Ghatsila region in 1767 jointly with Raja of Midnapore, after a previous abortive attempt in 1765. The campaign against Dhalbhum was led by John Fergusson, who launched an attack on Ghatsila from Jambuni, defeating the local king and destroying Narsingarh Fort. The King was taken captive and deported to Midnapur. His nephew Jagannath Dhal was placed on the throne on the condition that he would pay a yearly sum of Rs 55,000 to the British Government. Jagannath found it tough to cope with the demand, and was consequently replaced by Baikuntha Dhal. This did not deter Jagannath, who attacked Baikuntha with the help of the ruler of Jhargram and the zamindar of Ghatsila, Raja Jagannath Singh. Finally, he was reinstated on the condition that during the first year of his reign, he would pay a tax of Rs 2000, in the second year Rs 3000 and in the third year Rs 4000. In 1800, rent of Rs 4, 267 was fixed, which was to be paid by the Kingdom. In 1845 the region was incorporated into the Singhbhum District. Following this, in accordance with 1848 Regulation Act, Singhbhum District was converted into a non-regulation district under the Governor of Bengal.

In 1766, Raja Jagannath Singh, a zamindar of Dampara of Ghatsila in Dhalbhum, revolted against the enhanced revenue taxes of the British East India Company. This revolt is well known as Chuar revolt, the first revolt against British East India Company in Bengal Presidency.

== Geography ==
Cities, towns and locations in East Singhbhum district in Kolhan Division (Locations around Jamshedpur are shown in the Jamshedpur Urban Agglomeration map - see Bagbera Colony page)
M: municipality, R: rural/ urban centre, CT: census town, T: tourist centre
Owing to space constraints in the small map, the actual locations in a larger map may vary slightly

=== Location ===
Dhalbhumgarh is located at 22.5161°N 86.5543°E.

Dhalbhumgarh is shown in Palashbani village/ mouza in the map of Dhalbhumgarh CD block in the District Census Handbook, Purbi Singhbhum, Series 21, Part XII A.

=== Area overview ===
The area shown in the map “forms a part of the Chota Nagpur Plateau and is a hilly upland tract”. The main rivers draining the district are the Subarnarekha and the Kharkai. The area lying between Jamshedpur and Ghatshila is the main industrial mining zone. The rest of the district is primarily agricultural. In the district, as of 2011, 56.9% of the population lives in the rural areas and a high 43.1% lives in the urban areas.

Note: The map alongside presents some of the notable locations in the district. All places marked in the map are linked in the larger full screen map.

== Civic administration ==
There is a police station at Dhalbhumgarh.

The headquarters of Dhalbhumgarh CD block is located at Dhalbhumgarh village.

== Demographics ==
According to the 2011 Census of India, Palashbani had a total population of 415, of which 197 (47%) were males and 218 (53%) were females. Population in the age range 0–6 years was 57. The total number of literate persons in Palashbani was 218 (60.89% of the population over 6 years).

(*For language details see Dhalbhumgarh block#Language and religion)

== Transport ==
Dhalbhumgarh railway station is managed by South Eastern Railways. National Highway 18 passes through Dhalbhumgarh. The closest airport, Sonari Airport, is at Jamshedpur, but Dhalbhumgarh Airport is planned.

== Education ==
Kasturba Gandhi Balika Vidyalaya is a Hindi-medium girls only institution established in 2006. It has facilities for teaching from class VI to class XII. The school has a playground, a library with 300 books, and has 7 computers for teaching and learning purposes.
