= Baharagora =

- Town
- Location in Jharkhand, India Baharagora (India)
- Coordinates: 22.28°N 86.72°E
- Country: India
- State: Jharkhand
- District: East Singhbhum
- Elevation: 79 m (259 ft)

Population (2011)
  - Total: 1,132

Languages*
  - Official: Hindi, Santali
- Time zone: UTC+5:30 (IST)
- PIN: 832101
- Telephone code: 91-6594
- Vehicle registration: JH 05
- Literacy: 89.54%
- Lok Sabha constituency: Jamshedpur
- Vidhan Sabha constituency: Baharagora
- Website: jamshedpur.nic.in

Baharagora is a town in the Baharagora CD block in the Ghatshila subdivision of the East Singhbhum district, in the Indian state of Jharkhand.

== History ==
Baharagora CD block was established in 1956.

== Geography ==
Cities, towns and locations in East Singhbhum district in Kolhan Division (Locations around Jamshedpur are shown in the Jamshedpur Urban Agglomeration map - see Bagbera Colony page)
M: municipality, R: rural/ urban centre, CT: census town, T: tourist centre
Owing to space constraints in the small map, the actual locations in a larger map may vary slightly

=== Location ===
Baharagora is located at 22.28°N 86.72°E. It has an average elevation of 79 m (259 ft). The Subarnarekha River flows along its adjoining areas (approx at a distance of 7 km [4.3 mi]).

It is situated on the south-east corner of Jharkhand. It is 60 km (37 mi) from Kharagpur, 90 km (56 mi) from Jamshedpur, 50 km (31 mi) from Ghatshila, 50 km (31 mi) from Baripada and 200 km (120 mi) from Kolkata

Baharagora is the entry point of Jharkhand from the two states, namely West Bengal and Odisha, as it is located at the border, West Bengal is approx 12 km (7.5 mi) and Odisha is approx 7 km (4.3 mi) from there.

== Civic administration ==
There is a police station at Baharagora.

The headquarters of Baharagora CD block is located at Baharagora village.

== Demographics ==
According to the 2011 Census of India, Baharagora had a total population of 1,132, of which 571 (50%) were males and 561 (50%) were females. Population in the age range 0-6 years was 128. The total number of literate persons in Baharagora was 899 (89.54% of the population over 6 years).

(*For language details see Baharagora block#Language and religion)

Dialect spoken: Bahraagi

== Transport ==
Baharagora is a very important hub for transport as National Highway 6/Asian Highway 46 passes through here and almost all the Transport Companies have their transit hub here. National Highway 18 connects NH 6 at Baharagora and NH 2 at Barhi, Jharkhand. It is connected to Baripada in Odisha by NH 18.

The nearest railway stations are Chakulia 30.6 km (19.0 mi), Ghatsila 47 km (29 mi), Jhargram 50 km (31 mi), Kharagpur 60 km (37 mi), Tatanagar 90 km (56 mi) & Kolkata (Howrah) 189 km (117 mi).

Nearest International Airport Kolkata, Netaji Subhas Chandra Bose International Airport.

== Education ==
=== Schools ===
- Jawahar Navodaya Vidyalaya, Balikuria
- Kasturba Gandhi Balika Vidyalaya, Baharagora

== Culture ==
- Chitreshwer Shiv Mandir - 12 km (7.5 mi).
- Baharagora Krishi Mela.
