= Gurbandha =

- Village
- Location in Jharkhand, India Gurbandha (India)
- Coordinates: 22.3376°N 86.5456°E
- Country: India
- State: Jharkhand
- District: East Singhbhum

Government
  - Type: Federal democracy

Population (2011)
  - Total: 1,312

Languages *
  - Official: Hindi, Urdu
- Time zone: UTC+5:30 (IST)
- PIN: 832302
- Telephone/ STD code: 0657
- Vehicle registration: JH 05
- Literacy: 66.81%
- Lok Sabha constituency: Jamshedpur
- Vidhan Sabha constituency: Baharagora
- Website: jamshedpur.nic.in

Gurbandha (also written as Gurbanda) is a village in the Gurbandha CD block in the Ghatshila subdivision of the East Singhbhum district in the Indian state of Jharkhand.

== Geography ==
Cities, towns and locations in East Singhbhum district in Kolhan Division (Locations around Jamshedpur are shown in the Jamshedpur Urban Agglomeration map - see Bagbera Colony page)
M: municipality, R: rural/ urban centre, CT: census town, T: tourist centre
Owing to space constraints in the small map, the actual locations in a larger map may vary slightly

=== Location ===
Gurbandha is located at 22.3376°N 86.5456°E.

=== Area overview ===
The area shown in the map "forms a part of the Chota Nagpur Plateau and is a hilly upland tract". The main rivers draining the district are the Subarnarekha and the Kharkai. The area lying between Jamshedpur and Ghatshila is the main industrial mining zone. The rest of the district is primarily agricultural. In the district, as of 2011, 56.9% of the population lives in the rural areas and a high 43.1% lives in the urban areas.

Note: The map alongside presents some of the notable locations in the district. All places marked in the map are linked in the larger full screen map.

== Civic administration ==
There is a police station at Gurabanda.

The headquarters of Gurabandha CD block is located at Gurabandha village.

== Demographics ==
According to the 2011 Census of India, Gurbandha had a total population of 1,312, of which 658 (50%) were males and 654 (50%) were females. Population in the age range 0–6 years was 158. The total number of literate persons in Gurbandha was 771 (66.81% of the population over 6 years).

(*For language details see Gurbandha block#Language and religion)

== Education ==
Government High School Gurabanda is a Hindi-medium coeducational institution established in 1973. It has facilities for teaching from class I to class X. The school has a library with 621 books.
