= Ghatshila subdivision =

- Subdivision
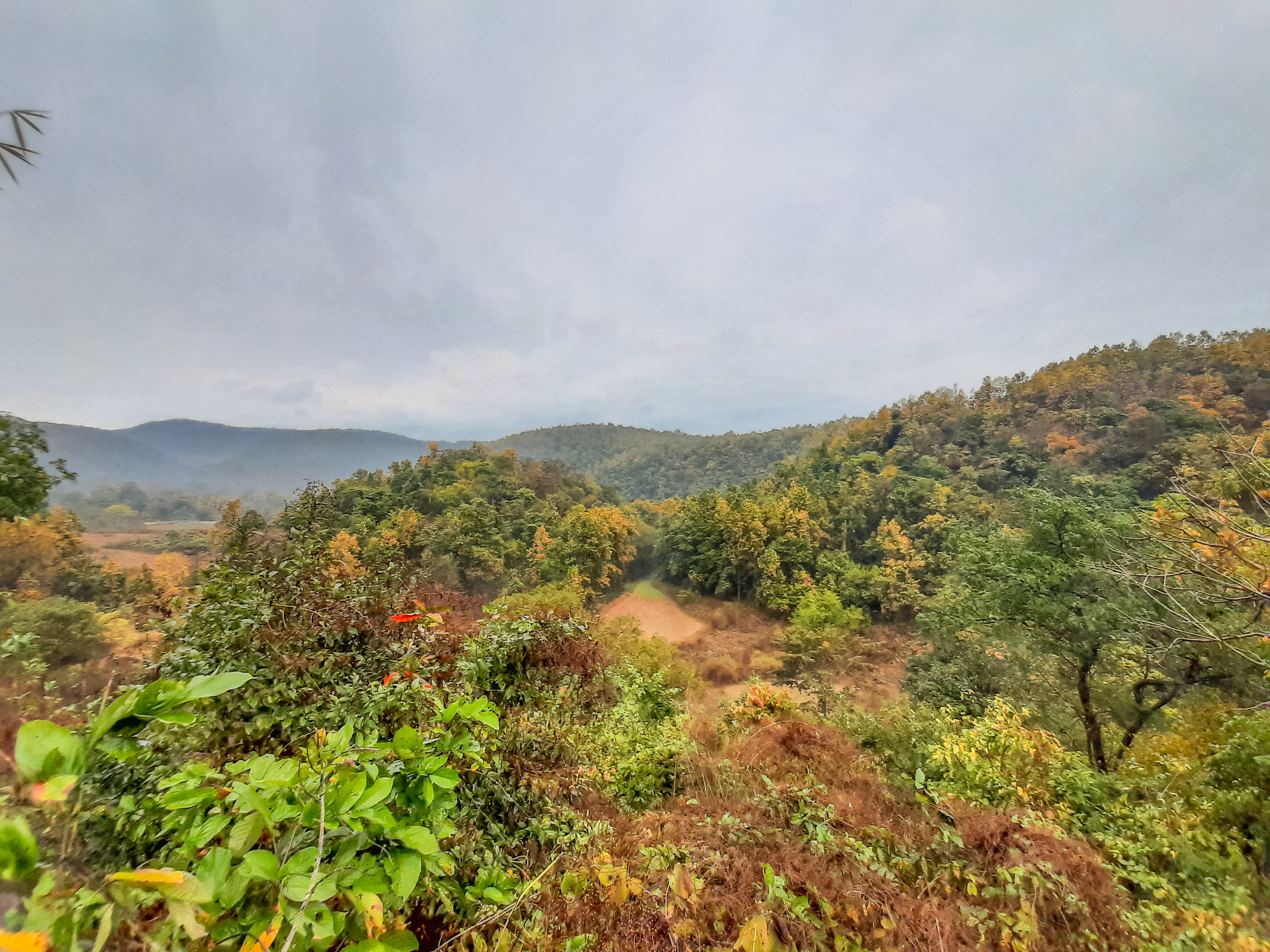
- On the way to Dharagiri Falls, Ghatshila

- Location in Jharkhand, India Ghatshila subdivision (India)
- Coordinates: 22.5801°N 86.4543°E
- Country: India
- State: Jharkhand
- District: Purbi Singhbhum
- Headquarters: Ghatshila

Area
  - Total: 2,094.79 km^{2} (808.80 sq mi)

Population
  - Total: 682,217
  - Density: 325.673/km^{2} (843.490/sq mi)

Languages
  - Official: Hindi, Urdu
  - Most spoken language: Bengali
- Time zone: UTC+5:30 (IST)
- Website: jamshedpur.nic.in

Ghatshila subdivision is an administrative subdivision of the East Singhbhum district in the Kolhan division in the state of Jharkhand, India.

== Administration ==
For Cities, towns and locations in East Singhbhum district in Kolhan Division (Locations around Jamshedpur are shown in the Jamshedpur Urban Agglomeration map - see Bagbera Colony page)
M: municipality, R: rural/ urban centre, CT: census town, T: tourist centre
Owing to space constraints in the small map, the actual locations in a larger map may vary slightly

The district East Singhbhum consists of two subdivisions - (1) Dhalbhum subdivision with Patamda, Boram, Golmuri-cum-Jugsalai and Potka CD blocks, and (2) Ghatshila subdivision with Ghatshila, Dhalbhumgarh, Musabani, Dumaria, Gurbandha, Chakulia and Baharagora CD blocks.

The subdivisions of Purbi Singhbhum district have the following distinctions:

Subdivision	Headquarters	Area km^{2}	Population (2011) (Note: Calculated on the basis of block-wise data available.)	Rural population % (2011)	Urban population % (2011)
Dhalbhum	Jamshedpur	1,460.73	1,611,702	27.53	72.47
Ghatshila	Ghatshila	2,094.79	682,217	86.78	13.22

=== Blocks ===
Community development blocks in the Ghatshila subdivision are:

CD Block	Headquarters	Area km^{2}	Population (2011)	SC %	ST %	Literacy rate %	CT
Ghatshila	Ghatshila	349.12	129,905	6.52	42.08	70.72	Ghatshila
Musabani	Musabani	239.00	107,084	5.51	46.35	70.94	Jadugora, Musabani
Dhalbhumgarh	Dhalbhumgarh	176.85	61,932	5.57	54.38	62.75	-
Dumaria	Dumaria	316.74	62,128	5.57	71.88	57.11	-
Chakulia	Chakuliya	412.81	108,810	2.89	51.24	64.35	-
Gurbandha	Gurbandha	229.07	43,001	3.33	66.59	55.05	-
Baharagora	Baharagora	351.10	153,051	6.84	35.91	64.45	-

=== Police stations ===
Police stations in the Ghatshila subdivision are at:

1. Bharagora
2. Chakulia
3. Dumaria
4. Dhalbhumgarh
5. Galudih
6. Ghatshila
7. Gurbanda
8. Jadugora
9. Musabani
10. Burasol
11. Maubhandar

== Education ==
In 2011, in Ghatshila subdivision out of a total 1,086 inhabited villages in 7 CD blocks there were 80 villages with pre-primary schools, 768 villages with primary schools, 281 villages with middle schools, 51 villages with secondary schools, 11 villages with senior secondary schools, 4 villages with general degree colleges, 304 villages with no educational facility.

The 4 census towns + 1 nagar panchayat had 54 primary schools, 30 middle schools, 21 secondary schools, 11 senior secondary schools, 6 general degree colleges. (Census towns are normally considered to be a part of the CD block but it is not clear where these are being considered here).
.*Senior secondary schools are also known as Inter colleges in Jharkhand.

=== Educational institutions ===
The following institutions are located in Ghatshila subdivision:

- Ghatshila College was established at Ghatshila in 1961.
- Baharagora College was established at Baharagora in 1969.
- Shibu Ranjan Khan Memorial Degree College was established at Chakuliya in 2010.
- BDSL Mahila College, Ghatsila was established at Ghatsila in 1982.

== Healthcare ==
In 2011, in Ghatshia subdivision, in the 7 CD blocks, there were 9 villages with primary health centres, 68 villages with primary health subcentres, 23 villages with maternity and child welfare centres, 5 villages with allopathic hospitals, 11 villages with dispensaries, 1 village with a veterinary hospital, 27 villages with family welfare centres, 38 villages with medicine shops.

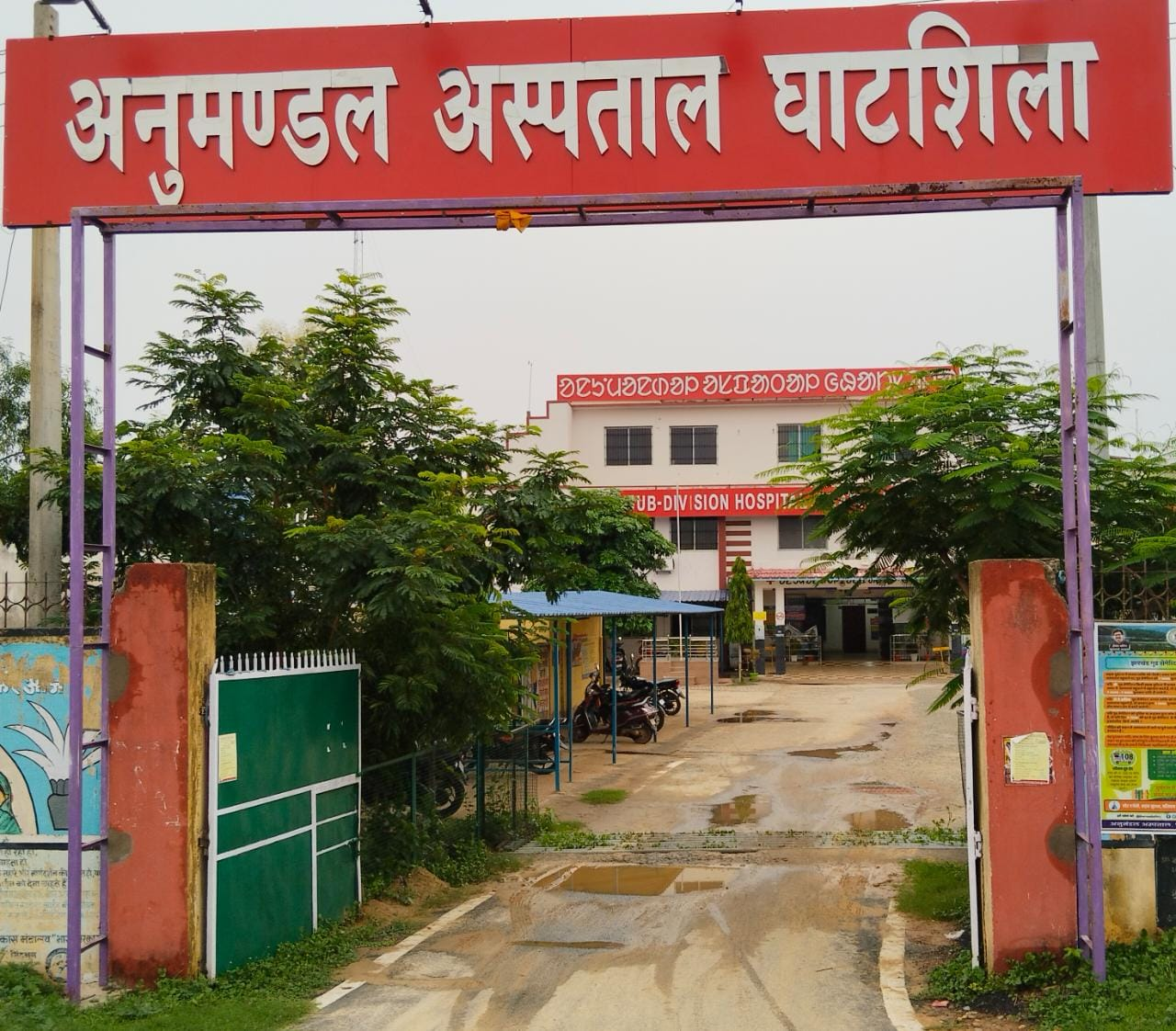
Sub-division hospital, Ghatshila

The 4 census towns + 1 nagar panchayat had 7 hospitals, 7 nursing homes, 84 dispensaries, 171 maternity and child welfare centres, 45 medicine shops. (Census towns are normally considered to be a part of the CD block but it is not clear where these are being considered here).
.*Private medical practitioners, alternative medicine etc. not included
