= Boram, Purvi Singhbhum =

Boram
- Village
- Location in Jharkhand, India Boram (India)
- Coordinates: 22.9568°N 86.2844°E
- Country: India
- State: Jharkhand
- District: East Singhbhum
- Established: founder =

Government
  - Type: Federal democracy

Population (2011)
  - Total: 3,317

Languages *
  - Official: Hindi, Urdu
- Time zone: UTC+5:30 (IST)
- PIN: 832112
- Telephone/ STD code: 0657
- Vehicle registration: JH 05
- Literacy: 68.17%
- Lok Sabha constituency: Jamshedpur
- Vidhan Sabha constituency: Jugsalai
- Website: jamshedpur.nic.in

Boram is a village in the Boram CD block in the Dhalbhum subdivision of the East Singhbhum district in the Indian state of Jharkhand.

== Geography ==
Cities, towns and locations in East Singhbhum district in Kolhan Division (Locations around Jamshedpur are shown in the Jamshedpur Urban Agglomeration map - see Bagbera Colony page)
M: municipality, R: rural/ urban centre, CT: census town, T: tourist centre
Owing to space constraints in the small map, the actual locations in a larger map may vary slightly

=== Location ===
Boram is located at 22.9568°N 86.2844°E.

=== Area overview ===
The area shown in the map "forms a part of the Chota Nagpur Plateau and is a hilly upland tract". The main rivers draining the district are the Subarnarekha and the Kharkai. The area lying between Jamshedpur and Ghatshila is the main industrial mining zone. The rest of the district is primarily agricultural. In the district, as of 2011, 56.9% of the population lives in the rural areas and a high 43.1% lives in the urban areas.

Note: The map alongside presents some of the notable locations in the district. All places marked in the map are linked in the larger full screen map.

== Civic administration ==
There is a police station at Boram.

The headquarters of Boram CD block is located at Boram village.

== Demographics ==
According to the 2011 Census of India, Boram had a total population of 3,314, of which 1,760 (53%) were males and 1,554 (47%) were females. Population in the age range 0–6 years was 485. The total number of literate persons in Boram was 1,807 (63.87% of the population over 6 years).

(*For language details see Boram block#Language and religion)

== Education ==
Adibasi High School is a Bengali-medium coeducational institution established in 1963. It has facilities for teaching in classes IX and X. The school has a library with 773 books.
