= Dhalbhumgarh railway station =

Railway Station in Jharkhand

Dhalbhumgarh Railway Station
- Dhalbhumgarh railway station

General information
- Location: National Highway 33, Dhalbhumgarh, East Singhbhum district, Jharkhand; India
- Coordinates: 22.505586°N 86.552968°E
- Elevation: 115 m (377 ft)
- System: Passenger train station
- Owner: Indian Railways
- Operator: South Eastern Railway
- Line: Howrah–Nagpur–Mumbai line
- Platforms: 4

Construction
- Structure type: Standard (on ground station)

Other information
- Status: Functioning
- Station code: DVM
- Zone(s): South Eastern Railway zone
- Division(s): Kharagpur railway division

History
- Former names: Bengal Nagpur Railway
Location
- Location within India Location within Jharkhand

Dhalbhumgarh Railway Station is a railway station on Howrah–Nagpur–Mumbai line under Kharagpur railway division of South Eastern Railway zone. It is situated at Dhalbhumgarh in East Singhbhum district in the Indian state of Jharkhand. It is 48 km (30 mi) from Tatanagar Junction.
