= Dumaria, Purvi Singhbhum =

Dumaria
- Village
- Location in Jharkhand, India Dumaria (India)
- Coordinates: 22.4556°N 86.4387°E
- Country: India
- State: Jharkhand
- District: East Singhbhum

Government
  - Type: Federal democracy

Population (2011)
  - Total: 1,507

Languages *
  - Official: Hindi, Santali
- Time zone: UTC+5:30 (IST)
- PIN: 832104
- Telephone/ STD code: 0657
- Vehicle registration: JH 05
- Literacy: 76.52%
- Lok Sabha constituency: Jamshedpur
- Vidhan Sabha constituency: Potka
- Website: jamshedpur.nic.in

Dumaria (also spelled Dumariya, Dumriya) is a village in the Dumaria CD block in the Ghatshila subdivision of the East Singhbhum district in the Indian state of Jharkhand.

== Geography ==
Cities, towns and locations in East Singhbhum district in Kolhan Division (Locations around Jamshedpur are shown in the Jamshedpur Urban Agglomeration map - see Bagbera Colony page)
M: municipality, R: rural/ urban centre, CT: census town, T: tourist centre
Owing to space constraints in the small map, the actual locations in a larger map may vary slightly

=== Location ===
Dumriya is located at 22.4556°N 86.4387°E.

=== Area overview ===
The area shown in the map "forms a part of the Chota Nagpur Plateau and is a hilly upland tract". The main rivers draining the district are the Subarnarekha and the Kharkai. The area lying between Jamshedpur and Ghatshila is the main industrial mining zone. The rest of the district is primarily agricultural. In the district, as of 2011, 56.9% of the population lives in the rural areas and a high 43.1% lives in the urban areas.

Note: The map alongside presents some of the notable locations in the district. All places marked in the map are linked in the larger full screen map.

== Civic administration ==
There is a police station at Dumaria.

The headquarters of Dumaria CD block is located at Dumaria village.

== Demographics ==
According to the 2011 Census of India, Dumariya had a total population of 1,507, of which 778 (52%) were males and 729 (48%) were females. Population in the age range 0–6 years was 187. The total number of literate persons in Dumariya was 1,010 (76.52% of the population over 6 years).

(*For language details see Dumaria block#Language and religion)

== Education ==
Model School Dumaria is an English-medium coeducational institution established in 2011. It has facilities for teaching from class VI to class X.

Project Balika High School is a Hindi-medium girls only institution established in 1984. It has facilities for teaching in classes IX and X. The school has a playground and a library with 800 books.
