= Dumaria, Chandauli district =

Village in Chandauli District, Uttar Pradesh, India

Dumaria is a village in Naugarh Block of Chandauli District of Eastern Uttar Pradesh in North India.
Co-ordinates : 24.8298838°N, 83.2088458,696°E ZIP Code : 232111.
