= Chitreshwer =

Chitreshwer Chitreshwar Baba Dham Chitreshwar
- Village
- Location in Jharkhand, India Chitreshwer (India)
- Coordinates: 22°16′51″N 86°44′19″E
- Country: India
- State: Jharkhand
- District: East Singhbhum

Population
  - Total: 2,500

Languages
  - Official: Hindi, Santali, Bengali
- Time zone: UTC+5:30 (IST)
- PIN: 832101
- Vehicle registration: JH

Chitreshwer or Chitreshwar is a village in Jharkhand, India. It has a population of nearly 1500.

== Economy ==
The major occupations are farming and commerce. The area produces mainly peanuts and vegetables. The village has done well recently with the peanut crop, contributing to the growth and development of the village. The people of the village are also in the peanut trading business. They supply peanuts to whole east Singhbhum and nearby areas of Midnapore districts. The village is advancing as well in terms of literacy as well as culture. The farmers use the latest equipment and technology. The government is contributing for modernisation in the area, providing a 24-hour electricity supply and concrete roads for better connectivity to major locations nearby. The village has all major mobile towers and internet facilities as well. The village has direct connectivity via buses to Jamshedpur, Kharagpur, and Baripada in Mayurbhanj district. This village is also known for its great hospitality. The village people welcome each and everybody with great warmth and pleasure. Once visited, you will surely return to this place if you love "desi" hospitality.

== Chitreshwar temple ==
Chitreshwar Temple, in Chitreshwar village, houses the largest natural Shiva linga in India, although not known to many people. The next largest is at Lingaraj Temple in Bhubaneswar. The present temple dates back to 10th century and was built by the Somavamshi dynasty /Keshari dynasty of Odisha. This temple was built in Odishan temple architecture. It is traditionally believed to be about 3,000 years old and is mentioned in the Utkala Khanda of Skandha Purana.

It is believed that all the wishes made here are fulfilled, and Lord Shiva blesses his devotees by fulfilling their wishes. Every year during February or March on the day of Maha Shivaratri or the Shiva Chaturdasi festival, devotees of Lord Shiva come from distant places to pray to the god. This event attracts a few thousand people annually. A huge "Mela" or Fair is held at this time. Devotees do "tongue piercing" on this occasion. The village also has "Subarnarekha" river passing by its side. It is believed and witnessed by the people of this village that gold floats on the banks of this river "Subarnarekha".

Chitreshwar Temple is an ancient temple dedicated to Lord Shiva. It is located at Chitreshwar, which is 55 km from Chakulia Railway Station. The town of Bahragora is 12 km from here. A popular fair is held in temple on the day of Shiva Chaturdasi. The devotees from several places, particularly from the bordering villages of Midnapore (West Bengal) and Mayurbhanj (Odisha) districts, assemble here.
