= Musabani =

Musabani مسابانی
- Census Town
- Nickname: Tamranagari
- Location in Jharkhand, India Musabani (India)
- Coordinates: 22.52°N 86.45°E
- Country: India
- State: Jharkhand
- District: East Singhbhum

Area
  - Total: 10.99 km^{2} (4.24 sq mi)
- Elevation: 160 m (520 ft)

Population (2011)
  - Total: 31,035 Musabani Population Religion Data Religion Percentage Hindu 46.20% Muslim 32.90% Christian 2.43% Sikh 0.66% Buddhist 0.18% Jain 0.00% Others 17.36% No Religion 0.26%
  - Density: 2,824/km^{2} (7,314/sq mi)
- Time zone: UTC+5:30 (IST)
- PIN: 832104
- Telephone/STD code: 0657
- Vehicle registration: JH 05
- Literacy: 79.20%
- Lok Sabha constituency: Jamshedpur
- Vidhan Sabha constituency: Ghatsila
- Website: jamshedpur.nic.in

Musabani, also spelt as Mosabani or Mushabani, is a census town in the Musabani block, a Community development block in the Ghatshila subdivision of the East Singhbhum district in the Indian state of Jharkhand.

== History ==
Origin of the town dates backs before the independence of India. Mining was done from the ancient time but the place saw an economic boom when mining was restarted by the British. Mines situated in Musabani are some of the first copper mines of then British India. Mining started in early 1930s as the first mine. Banalopa mine was started in 1928.

Cities, towns and locations in East Singhbhum district in Kolhan Division (Locations around Jamshedpur are shown in the Jamshedpur Urban Agglomeration map - see Bagbera Colony page)
M: municipality, R: rural/ urban centre, CT: census town, T: tourist centre
Owing to space constraints in the small map, the actual locations in a larger map may vary slightly

== Location ==
Musabani is located at 22.52°N 86.45°E. It has an average elevation of 160 m (520 ft).

== Civic administration ==
There is a police station at Musabani.

The headquarters of the Musabani CD block is located at Musabani village.

== Demographics ==
According to the 2011 Census of India, Musabani had a total population of 31,035, of which 16,063 (52%) were males and 14,972 (48%) were females. Population in the age range 0–6 years was 3,537. The total number of literate persons in Musabani was 21,778 (79.20% of the population over 6 years).

(*For language details see Musabani block#Language and religion)

As of 2001 India census, Musabani had a population of 33,892. Males constitute 52% of the population and females 48%. Musabani has an average literacy rate of 67%, higher than the national average of 59.5%: male literacy is 76%, and female literacy is 58%. In Musabani, 12% of the population is under 6 years of age.

=== Languages ===
Languages spoken in Musabani Town (2011)
1. Urdu (24.6%)
2. Bengali (18.6%)
3. Santali (17.3%)
4. Hindi (14.4%)
5. Odia (9.32%)
6. Bhojpuri (3.01%)
7. Others (12.8%)

=== Religion ===
Religion in Musabani Town (2011)
1. Hindu (46.2%)
2. Muslim (32.9%)
3. Sarna (17.4%)
4. Christian (2.43%)
5. Sikh (0.66%)
6. Buddhist (0.18%)
7. Others (0.27%)

== Infrastructure ==
According to the District Census Handbook 2011, Purbi Singhbhum, Musabani covered an area of 10.99 km^{2} (4.24 sq mi). It has an annual rainfall of 1,030.2 mm (40.56 in).
