= NITI Aayog =

Indian government think tank

- Logo of NITI Aayog

Government agency overview
- Formed: 1 January 2015; 11 years ago
- Jurisdiction: Government of the Republic of India
- Headquarters: New Delhi
- Annual budget: ₹339.65 crores currency (2018-19) including Ministry of Planning
- Government agency executives: Narendra Modi, Chairperson; Ashok Lahiri, Vice Chairperson; Anurag Jain (IAS) , CEO
- Parent Government agency: Ministry of Planning
- Website: www.niti.gov.in

The NITI Aayog (National Institution for Transforming India) serves as the apex public policy think tank of the Government of the Republic of India, and the nodal agency tasked with catalyzing economic development, and fostering cooperative federalism and moving away from bargaining federalism through the involvement of State Governments of India in the economic policy-making process using a bottom-up approach.

It was established in 2015, by the NDA government, to replace the Planning Commission which followed a top-down model. The NITI Aayog council comprises all the state Chief Ministers, along with the Chief Ministers of Delhi, Puducherry and Jammu and Kashmir, Lieutenant Governors of all Union Territories, and a vice-chairman nominated by the Prime Minister. In addition, temporary members are selected from leading universities and research institutions. These members include a chief executive officer, four ex-officio members, and three part-time members.

== History ==
On 29 May 2014, the Independent Evaluation Office submitted an assessment report to Prime Minister Narendra Modi with the recommendation to replace the Planning Commission with a "control commission." On 13 August 2014, the Union Cabinet scrapped the Planning Commission, to be replaced with a diluted version of the National Advisory Council (NAC) of India which was established by the United Progressive Alliance (UPA) government. On 1 January 2015, a Cabinet resolution was passed to replace the Planning Commission with the newly formed NITI Aayog (National Institution for Transforming India). The Union Government of India announced the formation of NITI Aayog on 1 January 2015. The first meeting of NITI Aayog was chaired by Narendra Modi on 8 February 2015.

Finance Minister during that time made the following observation on the necessity of creating NITI Aayog, "The 65-year-old Planning Commission had become a redundant organization. It was relevant in a command economy structure, but not any longer. India is a diversified country and its states are in various phases of economic development along with their own strengths and weaknesses. In this context, a ‘one size fits all’ approach to economic planning is obsolete. It cannot make India competitive in today's global economy."

== NITI Lectures ==
NITI Aayog has started a new initiative on the advice of Prime Minister Narendra Modi called NITI Lectures: Transforming India. The aim of this initiative is to invite globally reputed policy makers, experts, administrators to India to share their knowledge, expertise, experience in policy making and good governance with Indian counterparts. This initiative will be a series of lectures started with first lecture delivered by Deputy Prime Minister of Singapore Tharman Shanmugaratnam. He delivered lecture on subject called "India and the Global Economy" at Vigyan Bhavan, New Delhi. The Prime Minister spoke about the idea behind this lecture series and stated that his vision for India is rapid transformation, not gradual evolution.

On 31 August 2017, NITI Aayog developed a State Statistics Handbook that consolidates key statistics across sectors for every Indian State and Union Territory. While the State data on crucial indicators is currently fragmented across different sources, this handbook provides a one-stop database of important State statistics.

== Initiatives ==
NITI Aayog has taken initiative on blockchain usages in e-governance and has conceptualized the tech stack as 'India Chain'. India Chain is the name given to NITI Aayog's ambitious project to develop a nationwide blockchain network.

Artificial intelligence, machine learning, Internet of Things, blockchain and big data hold potential to take India to new heights

— Prime Minister Narendra Modi, at the 2016 World Economic Forum.

The vision is to link IndiaChain with IndiaStack, the digital infrastructure that forms the backbone of the Aadhaar project. The NITI Aayog initiative on the blockchain system will enforce contracts quicker, prevent fraudulent transactions, and help farmers through the efficient disbursement of subsidies. This project is the first step to a larger system of record keeping and public good disbursement.

NITI Aayog is developing a job portal to connect employers with workers who have returned to their home states due to nationwide lockdown.

The NITI Aayog has developed a Rs 75,000 crore vision for the industrial development of Great Nicobar Islands in Andaman and Nicobar Islands. The plan entails the development of a transshipment terminal with a greenfield international airport, townships and solar and gas-based power plants, and has faced substantial backlash from indigenous Shompen and Nicobarese communities who fear displacement. The proposed plan is expected to impose significant ecological pressure on the island, its wildlife and its surroundings.

In May 2025, NITI Aayog's Frontier Tech Hub hosted a high-level workshop on accelerating investments in AI-ready data centres across Indian states, organised in collaboration with Deloitte. NITI Aayog CEO B.V.R. Subrahmanyam urged state governments to move beyond land-centric approaches and build comprehensive AI ecosystems, noting that India generates nearly 20% of the world's data while accounting for only 3% of global data centre capacity. The workshop brought together senior officials from key state governments and central ministries including the Ministry of Finance, Department of Telecommunications and Ministry of New and Renewable Energy.

== Other initiatives ==
=== Student Entrepreneurship Programme ===
The Student Entrepreneurship Programme (SEP) 1.0 was launched in 2019 while the SEP 2.0 launched in 2020 aimed to convert the grassroot innovations of Atal Tinkering Lab (ATL) students into end products. The SEP 2.0 which was launched in 2020 provided the opportunity to the students of ATL to work with Dell volunteers and to get mentor support, end user feedback, manufacturing support and launch support of their products in the market. The scheme would be launched and run by Atal Innovation Mission (AIM) under NITI Aayog in association with Dell technologies.

=== Free tech-driven learning programmes ===
In September 2021, NITI Aayog in association with [oyo] launched an initiative to provide free tech-driven learning programmes to engineering aspirants from 112 districts of the country.

=== Behavioural Insights Unit ===
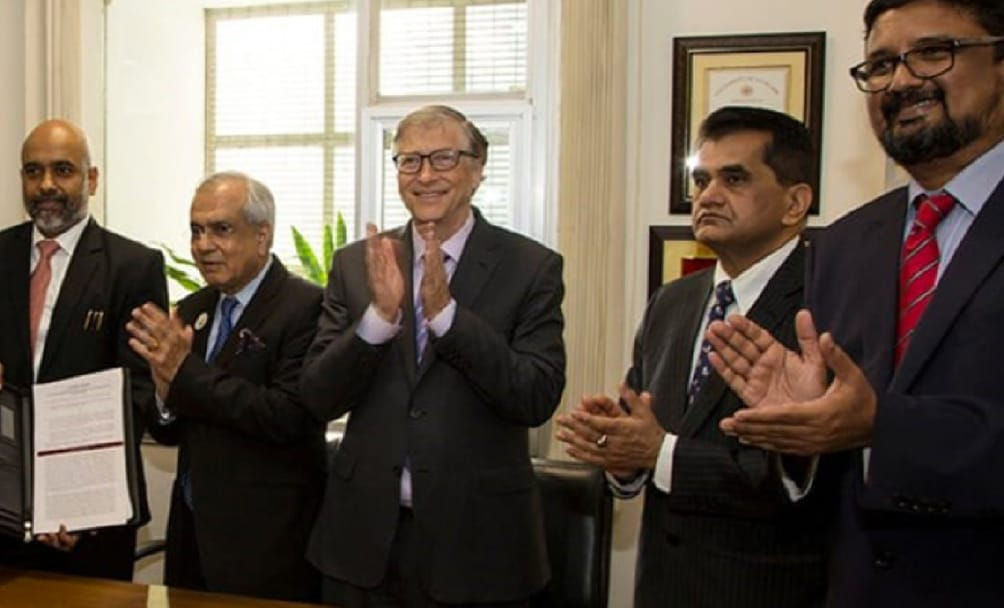
Bill Gates with Amitabh Kant (then CEO of Niti Aayog), Pavan Mamidi (Director of CSBC) and others

NITI Aayog launched the Behavioural Insights Unit (NITI-BIU) in partnership with the Centre for Social and Behaviour Change and the Bill and Melinda Gates Foundation in November 2019. It is an independent unit under the office of the CEO of NITI Aayog, aimed at enhancing the design and delivery of public policy in India. NITI-BIU has worked with various Government ministries to leverage behavioural science to improve policy outcomes. It was conceived under the guidance of Amitabh Kant, and the founding team includes Archna Vyas from BMGF, Pavan Mamidi from CSBC, and Pramath Sinha, the founder of Ashoka University. The BIU was inaugurated in the presence of Bill Gates, the founder of BMGF.

The NITI-BIU has launched several initiatives since, in partnership with various state governments:

1. Navigating the new normal: CSBC, in partnership with NITI Aayog and the Gates Foundation, organised a campaign called ‘Navigating the new normal’ to promote COVID-19 safe behaviours. The campaign has two parts: The first is a web portal containing resources informed by behavioural science and the use of nudge and social norms theory related to COVID-safe behavioural norms during the ongoing Unlock phase, and the second is a media campaign focused on wearing masks.
2. LiFE Mission (Lifestyle for Environment): LiFE plans to leverage the strength of social networks to influence social norms surrounding climate. The Mission intends to create and nurture a worldwide network of individuals, Pro-Planet People’ (P3), committed to adopting and promoting environmentally friendly lifestyles. Through the P3 community, the Mission seeks to create an ecosystem that will reinforce and enable ecologically friendly behaviours to be self-sustainable. The project partners with United Nations India, UNEP, UNDP, the World Resources Institute, the Bill and Melinda Gates Foundation, and the Centre for Social and Behaviour Change.
3. Poshan Gyan: NITI Aayog, in partnership with the Bill and Melinda Gates Foundation and Centre for Social and Behaviour Change, Ashoka University launched “Poshan Gyan”, a national digital repository on health and nutrition. Poshan Gyan repository enables the search for communication materials on 14 thematic areas of health and nutrition across diverse languages, media types, target audiences, and sources.
4. Jal Jeevan Mission: Launched in 2019, Jal Jeevan Mission (JJM) is a national mission-mode program that aims to provide a Functional Household Tap Connection (FHTC) to every rural household by 2024. The Behavioural Insights Unit focused on developing green field interventions, using behaviours as levers for change. Research efforts from the field have translated into key insights:
  1. Communications guidelines: An active playbook to help users understand various nuances of behaviour change communication and develop innovative communication plans (or strategies) for JJM.
  2. Behavioural diagnostic report: A diagnosis of people's behaviours and motivations within the NJJM ecosystem via extensive field research, stakeholder consultations and literature analysis.
  3. The Compendium of Best Practices report compiles effective behavioural interventions and strategies across various fields for the Jal Jeevan Mission. It serves as a resource for identifying and applying proven practices to influence behaviour positively and achieve desired outcomes in different contexts.
5. Stories of Change: The "Stories of Change" report highlights impactful case studies and success stories related to behavioural change initiatives. It features narratives demonstrating how various interventions and strategies have led to significant improvements in health and well-being.
6. Behaviour Change Report: The "Behavior Change Report" analyses various behaviour change interventions and their effectiveness. It details successful strategies for influencing behaviours in different contexts, such as public health, environment, and education. This report was in collaboration with the Development Monitoring and Evaluation Offices.

== Members ==
The NITI Aayog comprises the following:

Ex-officio chairperson is Prime Minister of India.

- A Governing Council composed of Chief Ministers of all the States and Union territories with Legislatures and lieutenant governors of Union Territories (except Delhi, Jammu and Kashmir and Puducherry).
- Regional Councils composed of Chief Ministers of States and Lt. Governors of Union Territories in the region to address specific issues and contingencies impacting more than one state or a region.
- Full-time organizational framework composed of a vice-chairperson, four full-time members, two part-time members (from leading universities, research organizations and other relevant institutions in an ex-officio capacity), four ex-officio members of the Union Council of Ministers, a chief executive officer (with the rank of Secretary to the Government of India) who looks after administration, and a secretariat.
- Experts and specialists in various fields.

With the Prime Minister as the chairperson, presently NITI Aayog consists of:

- Vice Chairperson: Ashok Lahiri.
- Ex-Officio Members: Amit Shah, Rajnath Singh, Nirmala Sitaraman and Shivraj Singh Chouhan.
- Special Invitees: Nitin Gadkari, Piyush Goyal, Virendra Kumar, Ashwini Vaishnaw and Rao Inderjit Singh.
- Full-time Members: Rajiv Gauba (former Cabinet Secretary of India), Prof. K. V. Raju (Economist), Prof. Gobardhan Das (Academician & Immunologist), Prof. Abhay Karandikar (Academician & Telecom Technocrat), Dr.R Balasubramaniam (Public policy expert), Dr. M. Srinivas (Public Health expert) and Dr. Joram Aniya (Research & Public policy practitioner).
- Chief Executive Officer (CEO): Anurag Jain
- Governing Council: All Chief Ministers of States (including Delhi, Jammu and Kashmir and Puducherry), Lieutenant Governors of all other UTs
