= Kharkai River =

River in India

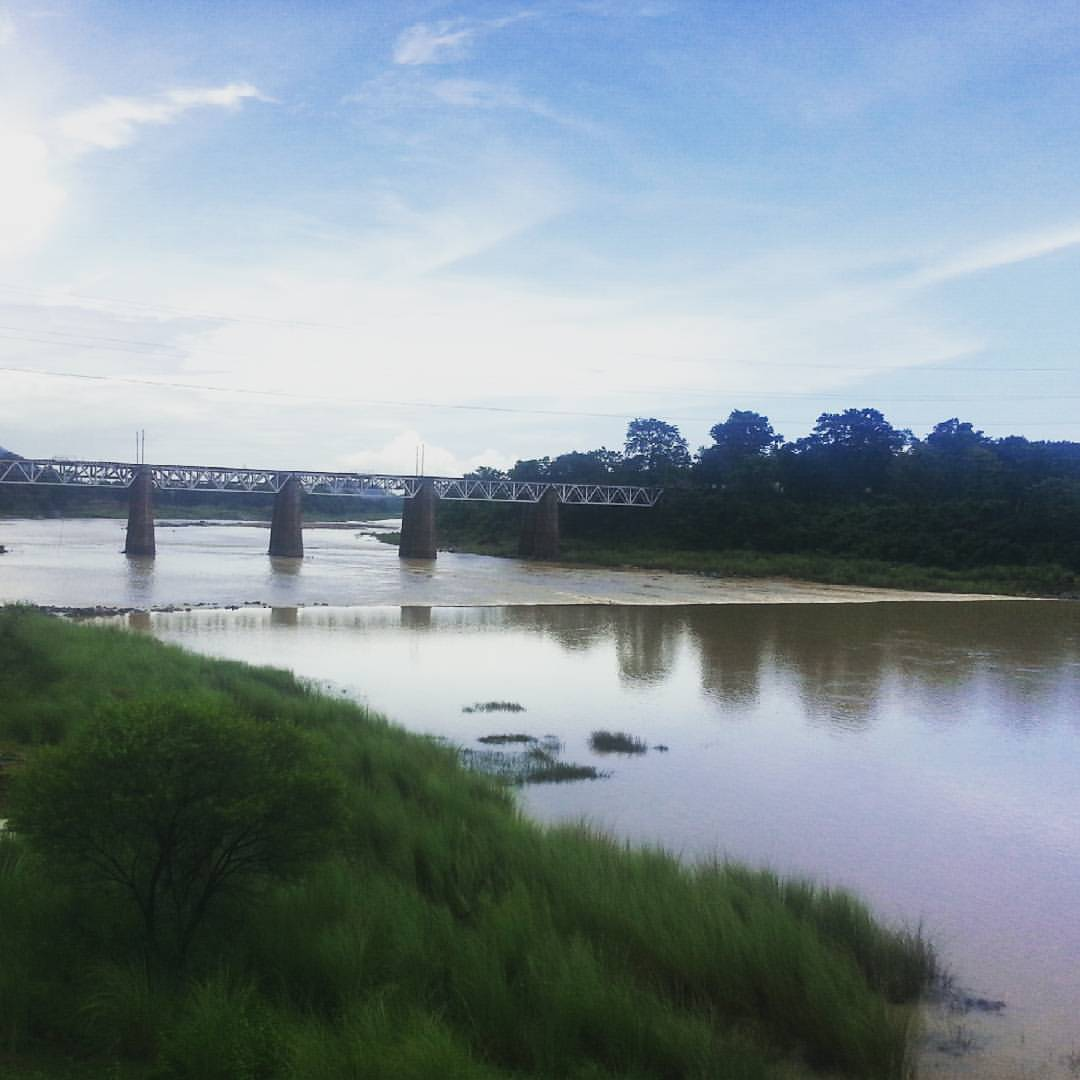
- Bridge over Kharkai river

Location
- Country: India
- State: Odisha, Jharkhand

Physical characteristics
- Source
  - location: Simlipal Massif, India
  - coordinates: 22°4′N 86°23′E
  - elevation: 928 m (3,045 ft)
- Mouth
  - location: Subarnarekha River, India
  - coordinates: 22°50′15″N 86°9′37″E
  - elevation: 134 m (440 ft)

The Kharkai River is a river in eastern India. It is one of the major tributaries of the Subarnarekha River. It flows through Adityapur region of Jamshedpur.

It arises in Mayurbhanj district, Odisha, on the north slopes of Darbarmela Parbat and the western slopes of Tungru Pahar, of the Simlipal Massif. It flows past Rairangpur and heads north to about Saraikela and then east, entering the Subarnarekha in northwestern Jamshedpur. Its tributaries in Orissa include the Kardkai, on the left; the Kandria, Nusa and Barhai on the right; and the Karanjia on the left. For about 9 kilometres (6 mi) below the junction with the Karanjia, the Kharkai forms the boundary between Odisha and Jharkhand State. After entering Jharkhand, its tributaries include the Torlo and Ili Gara on the left. Its last major tributary is the Sanjai, entering from the left, 17 kilometres (11 mi) above its mouth.

The valley of the lower Kharkai is quite wide and rice is the primary crop. Iron ore is mined in the mountains of the headwaters of the Kharkai, and there is a steel plant at Jamshedpur. The Kharkai Dam is located at Ichha, Odisha.

== Name ==
Some think that the river's name is derived from the Sanskrit word Kharakāyā meaning "fast flowing river" (khara means "fast" and kāyā means "body").
