= Birsanagar =

- Neighbourhood of Jamshedpur
- Birsanagar
- Motto: Johar Jharkhand
- Coordinates: 22°47′16.5″N 86°14′56″E
- Country: India
- City: Jamshedpur
- Time zone: GMT + 0530
- Postal code: 831019
- Commercial area of the city

Birsanagar is a part of Jamshedpur. It is divided into 12 zones which are further divided into smaller zones. Birsanagar was named after Birsa Munda.

== Civic administration ==
There is a police station at Birsanagar.

== See also ==
- Jamshedpur
- List of neighbourhoods of Jamshedpur
- Sakchi
- Adityapur
- Jugsalai
- Garabasa
- Bagbera
