= Dhalbhum subdivision =

- Subdivision
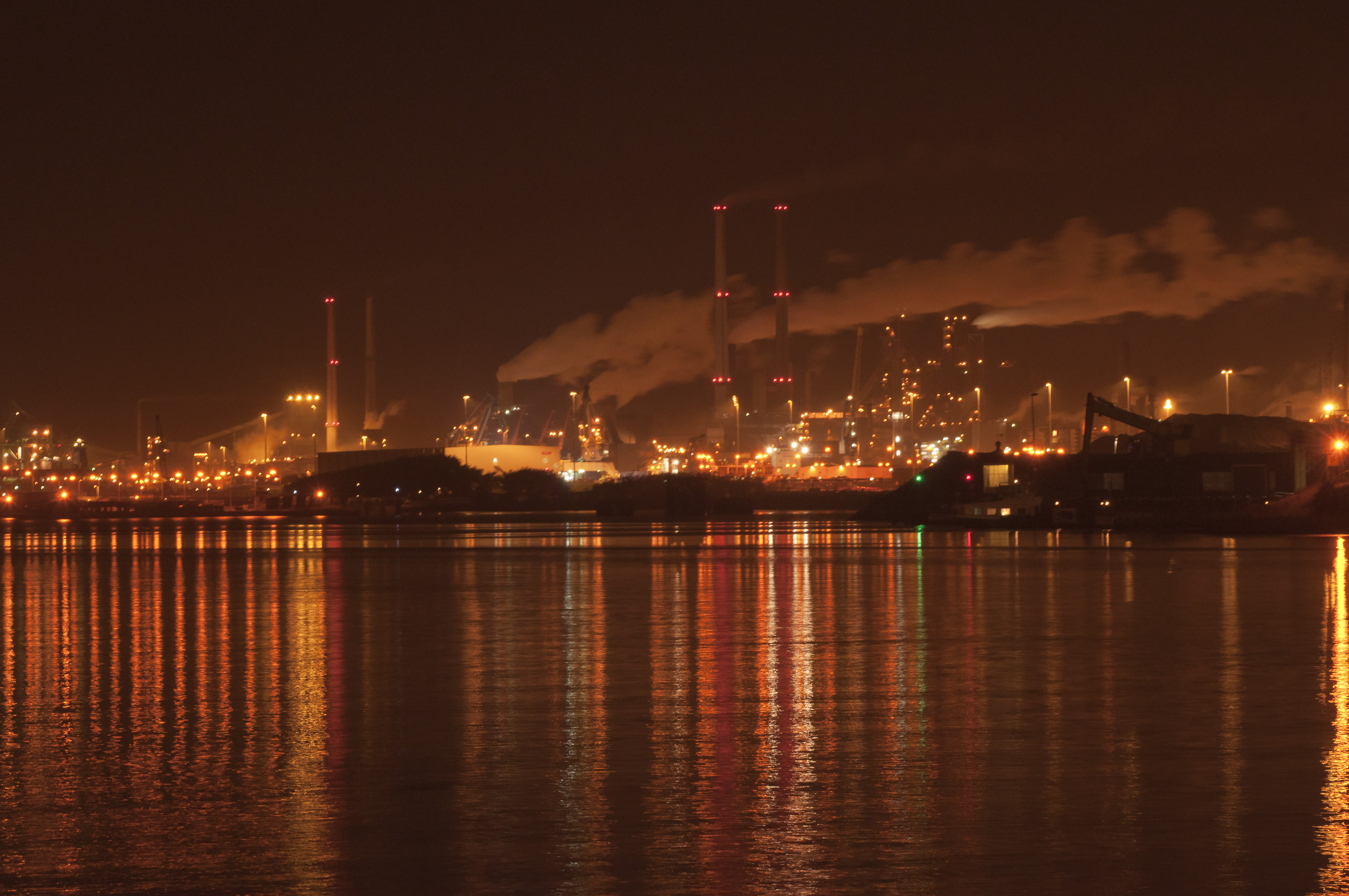
- Tata Steel in IJmuiden, the Netherlands

- Location in Jharkhand, India Dhalbhum subdivision (India)
- Coordinates: 22°46′10″N 86°10′49″E
- Country: India
- State: Jharkhand
- District: Purbi Singhbhum
- Headquarters: Jamshedpur

Area
  - Total: 1,460.73 km^{2} (563.99 sq mi)

Population
  - Total: 1,611,702
  - Density: 1,103.35/km^{2} (2,857.67/sq mi)

Languages
  - Official: Hindi, Urdu
  - Most spoken language: Bengali
- Time zone: UTC+5:30 (IST)
- Website: jamshedpur.nic.in

Dhalbhum subdivision is an administrative subdivision of the East Singhbhum district in the Kolhan division in the state of Jharkhand, India.

== History ==
Dhalbhum subdivision was created in 1920 with Jamshedpur as headquarters.

== Administrative set up ==
The district consists of two subdivisions - (1) Dhalbhum subdivision with Patamda, Boram, Golmuri-cum-Jugsalai and Potka CD blocks, and (2) Ghatshila subdivision with Ghatshila, Dhalbhumgarh, Musabani, Dumaria, Gurbandha, Chakulia and Baharagora CD blocks.

The subdivisions of Purbi Singhbhum district have the following distinctions:

Subdivision	Headquarters	Area km^{2}	Population (2011)	Rural population % (2011)	Urban population % (2011)
Dhalbhum	Jamshedpur	1,460.73	1,611,702	27.53	72.47
Ghatshila	Ghatshila	2,094.79	682,217	86.78	13.22

Note: Calculated on the basis of block-wise data available.

Cities, towns and locations in East Singhbhum district in Kolhan Division (Locations around Jamshedpur are shown in the Jamshedpur Urban Agglomeration map - see Bagbera Colony page)
M: municipality, R: rural/ urban centre, CT: census town, T: tourist centre
Owing to space constraints in the small map, the actual locations in a larger map may vary slightly

== Police stations ==
Police stations in the Dhalbhum subdivision are at:

1. Bagbera
2. Birsanagar
3. Bistupur
4. Boram
5. Govindpur
6. Jugsalai
7. Kadma
8. Mango
9. Patamda
10. Potka
11. Parsudih
12. Sakchi
13. Azadnagar
14. Burmamines
15. Golmuri
16. Kamalpur
17. Olidih
18. Sidhagora
19. Sitaramdera
20. Sonari
21. Sundarnagar
22. Sspur
23. Telco

== Blocks ==
Community development blocks in the Dhalbhum subdivision are:

CD Block	Headquarters	Area km^{2}	Population (2011)	SC %	ST %	Literacy rate %	CT
Golmuri-cum-Jugsalai	Jugsalai	246.61	355,372	3.10	28.91	79.00	Tata Nagar Railway Colony (OG), Bagbera, Haludbani, Sarjamda, Gadhra, Chhota Gobindpur, Ghorabandha, Purihasa
Patamada	Patamda	267.03	82,876	5.85	39.94	59.37	-
Boram	Boram	244.41	69,013	4.71	42.23	58.02	-
Potka	Potka	582.14	199,612	3.89	52.45	64.09	Haludpukur

== Education ==
In 2011, in Dhalbhum subdivision out of a total 523 inhabited villages in 4 CD blocks there were 38 villages with pre-primary schools, 479 villages with primary schools, 95 villages with middle schools, 40 villages with secondary schools, 5 villages with senior secondary schools, 44 villages with no educational facility.

The 3 statutory towns (Jamshedpur, Mango, Jugsalai) had 329 primary schools, 401 middle schools, 105 secondary schools, 16 senior secondary schools and 9 general degree colleges. 7 census towns had 84 primary schools, 38 middle schools, 23 secondary schools, 6 senior secondary schools, 1 general degree college. (Census towns are normally considered to be a part of the CD block but it is not clear where these are being considered here).
.*Senior secondary schools are also known as Inter colleges in Jharkhand.

=== Educational institutions ===
The following institutions are located in Dhalbhum subdivision:

- National Metallurgical Laboratory, a premier research organization, was established at Jamshedpur in 1950.
- XLRI – Xavier School of Management, the oldest business school in the country, was established at Jamshedpur in 1949.
- Jamshedpur Women's College was established at Jamshedpur in 1953.
- Jamshedpur Co-operative College was established at Jamshedpur in 1954.
- Jamshedpur Worker's College was established at Mango in 1957.
- Karim City College, Jamshedpur was established at Jamshedpur in 1961.
- The Graduate School College for Women, Jamshedpur was established at Jamshedpur in 1971.
- Lal Bahadur Shastri Memorial College was established at Jamshedpur in 1971.
- J. K. S. College, Jamshedpur was established at Jamshedpur in 1979.
- Patamda Degree College was established at Patamda in 1993.
- Jamshedpur Cooperative Law College was established at Jamshedpur in 2003.
- Loyola College of Education was established at Jamshedpur in 1976.

(Information about degree colleges in the subdivision with proper reference may be added here)

== Healthcare ==
In 2011, in Dhalbhum subdivision, in the 4 CD blocks, there were 6 villages with primary health centres, 55 villages with primary health subcentres, 15 villages with maternity and child welfare centres, 4 villages with allopathic hospitals, 7 villages with dispensaries, 7 villages with family welfare centres, 20 villages with medicine shops.

The 3 statutory towns in the subdivision had 29 hospitals, 43 nursing homes, 148 health centres, 148 dispensaries, 15 maternity and child welfare centres, 17 family welfare centres, 1,123 medicine shops. 7 census towns had 31 hospitals, 34 nursing homes, 30 dispensaries, 66 maternity and child welfare centres, 33 medicine shops. (Census towns are normally considered to be a part of the CD block but it is not clear where these are being considered here).
.*Private medical practitioners, alternative medicine etc. not included

=== Medical facilities ===
- Tata Main Hospital, with 914 beds, was established at Jamshedpur in 1908.
- Mahatma Gandhi Memorial Medical College, Jamshedpur, was established at Jamshedpur in 1961. It has 540 beds.

(Anybody having referenced information about location of government/ private medical facilities may please add it here)
