= Parsudih =

- Neighbourhood of Jamshedpur
- Location in Jharkhand, India Parsudih (India)
- Coordinates: 22.750556°N 86.224944°E
- Country: India
- State: Jharkhand
- District: Purbi Singhbhum
- City: Jamshedpur

Government
  - Type: Panchayat Samiti

Population
  - Total: 80,000

Languages
  - Official: Bengali, Hindi,
- Time zone: UTC+5:30 (IST)
- Postal code: 831002
- Vehicle registration: JH 05

Parsudih is a residential area in the city of Jamshedpur, Jharkhand state, India. It is situated on the other side of the Tatanagar railway station, towards Tata-Chaibasa highway.

It mostly has private residential and apartmental accommodation. It is located on the outskirts of Jamshedpur and falls under Panchayat. It is a Bengali dominated area in the city. Specifically there are no official languages. People residing here speak English, Hindi, Bengali, Oriya and Santhali.

Postal head office of Parsudih is Tatanagar. Parsudih comprises a vast area including Pramatha Nagar, Haludbani, Khasmahal, Sarjamda, Salgajhuri, Golpahari, Namotola, Dukhutola, Makhdumpur, Vidyasagar Pally and Karandih. Some of the neighbouring localities of Parsudih are Jugsalai, Sunder Nagar, Bagbera, Telco, Burma Mines. Tatanagar railway station is just a short distance from Parsudih.

== Demographics ==
As of 2001 India census, Parsudih had a population of 80000. Males constitute 51% of the population and females 49%. Parsudih has an average literacy rate of 71%, higher than the national average of 59.5%: male literacy is 78%, and female literacy is 62%. In Parsudih, 12% of the population is under 6 years of age. The people of PARSUDIH are 90% Bengali and 10% Indigenous. PARSUDIH is just about 5 km from JAMSHEDPUR'S biggest multiplex the P&M HIGH-TECH CITY CENTRE which opened recently, and has a big impact over the city. Parsudih market is very big and still contain the essence of 'HAT' Which means The bazar day The fresh vegetables, fruits and non-veg items like fresh fish is available during day, especially mornings. Chicken and mutton is always available

== Civic administration ==
There is a police station at Parsudih.
