= Golmuri-cum-Jugsalai block =

Golmuri-cum-Jugsalai
- Community development block
- Coordinates: 22.7638°N 86.1904°E
- Country: India
- State: Jharkhand
- District: East Singhbhum

Government
  - Type: Federal democracy

Area
  - Total: 246.61 km^{2} (95.22 sq mi)

Population (2011)
  - Total: 355,372
  - Density: 1,441.0/km^{2} (3,732.2/sq mi)

Languages
  - Official: Hindi, Urdu
- Time zone: UTC+5:30 (IST)
- PIN: 831002
- Telephone/STD code: 0657
- Vehicle registration: JH 05
- Literacy: 79.00%
- Lok Sabha constituency: Jamshedpur
- Vidhan Sabha constituency: Jugsalai, Potka
- Website: jamshedpur.nic.in

Golmuri-cum-Jugsalai block is a CD block that forms an administrative division in the Dhalbhum subdivision of East Singhbhum district, in the Indian state of Jharkhand.

== History ==
The laying of the foundation stone of the steel plant by Tata Steel (then known as Tata Iron and Steel Company) in 1907 at Sakchi Kalimati in Singhbhum district marked the beginning of the industrialisation of the area. The first police station in the area was opened in 1912 at Jugsalai. The Kalimati Sakchi village was renamed ‘Jamshedpur’ in 1917. Dhalbhum subdivision was created in 1920 with Jamshedpur as headquarters. Jamshedpur Notified Area was established in 1924. East Singhbhum district, with Jamshedpur as headquarters, was set up in 1990.

== Geography ==
Bagbera Colony, a constituent census town in the Golmuri-cum-Jugsalai CD block, is located at 22.7638°N 86.1904°E.

“The district forms a part of the Chota Nagpur Plateau and is a hilly upland tract”. The Seraikela Dhalbhumgarh upland and the Dalma range are natural divisions of the district. The main rivers are the Subarnarekha and the Kharkai.

The district consists of two subdivisions - (1) Dhalbhum subdivision with Patamda, Boram, Golmuri-cum-Jugsalai and Potka CD blocks, and (2) Ghatshila subdivision with Ghatshila, Dhalbhumgarh, Musabani, Dumaria, Gurbandha, Chakulia and Baharagora CD blocks.

Golmuri-cum-Jugsalai CD block is bounded by the Boram and the Patamda CD blocks on the north, the Bandwan CD block in the Purulia district of the West Bengal state and the Ghatshila CD block on the east, the Potka CD block on the south, and the Chandil and the Adityapur CD blocks in the Seraikela Kharsawan district on the west.

Golmuri-cum-Jugsalai CD block has an area of 246.61 km^{2}. Golmuri and Jugsalai police stations serve Golmuri-cum-Jugsalai CD block. The headquarters of Golmuri-cum-Jugsalai CD block is located at Jugsalai.

== Demographics ==
=== Population ===
According to the 2011 Census of India, Golmuri-cum-Jugsalai CD block had a total population of 355,372, of which 102,623 were rural and 252,749 were urban. There were 183,605 (52%) males and 171,767 (48%) females. Population in the age range 0–6 years was 48,799. Scheduled Castes numbered 11,028 (3.10%) and Scheduled Tribes numbered 102,739 (28.91%). (Note: There seems to be a mismatch between the ST and language figures. The figures quoted here are as officially published on the internet. Percentages have been calculated.)

Census towns in Golmuri-cum-Jugsalai CD block are (2011 population figure in brackets): Tata Nagar Railway Colony (OG) (45,986), Bagbera (78,356), Haludbani (25,360), Sarjamda (23,788), Gadhra (18,801), Chhota Gobindpur (31,843), Ghorabandha (20,718), Purihasa (7,897).

=== Literacy ===
According to the 2011 census, the total number of literate persons in Golmuri-cum-Jugsalai CD block was 242,180 (79.00% of the population over 6 years) out of which males numbered 137,277 (86.88% of the male population over 6 years) and females numbered 104,903 (70.61% of the female population over 6 years). The gender disparity (the difference between female and male literacy rates) was 16.27%.

As of 2011 census, literacy in Purbi Singhbhum district was 76.13%. Literacy in Jharkhand was 67.63% in 2011. Literacy in India in 2011 was 74.04%.

See also – List of Jharkhand districts ranked by literacy rate

Literacy in CD Blocks of
Purbi Singhbhum district
Dhalbhum subdivision
Patamda – 59.37%
Boram – 58.02%
Golmuri-cum-Jugsalai – 79.00%
Potka – 64.09%
Ghatshila subdivision
Ghatshila – 70.72%
Musabani – 70.94%
Dumaria – 57.11%
Dhalbhumgarh – 62.75%
Gurbandha – 55.05%
Chakulia – 64.35%
Baharagora – 64.45%
Source: 2011 Census: CD block Wise
Primary Census Abstract Data

== Language and religion ==
Language in Golmuri-cum-Jugsalai CD block (including Jamshedpur and Mango) (Note: An attempt has been made to include all language groups each with at least 500 persons as their mother-tongue and only those groups with less than 500 persons as their mother-tongue are included in the “other languages” category. Comparatively smaller language groups with 200+ persons as their mother-tongue are mentioned in the text. Many languages have sub-groups. For detailed breakdown see the reference.)
1. Hindi (28.5%)
2. Bengali (20.3%)
3. Urdu (11.7%)
4. Bhojpuri (9.80%)
5. Odia (5.56%)
6. Santali (4.75%)
7. Ho (3.34%)
8. Punjabi (3.27%)
9. Magahi (2.61%)
10. Maithili (2.24%)
11. Telugu (1.74%)
12. Mundari (1.13%)
13. Chhattisgarhi (0.92%)
14. Other (4.17%)

According to the 2011 census, in the Golmuri-cum-Jugsalai subdistrict (including Jamshedpur and Mango) Hindi was the mother-tongue of 549,888 persons forming 43.63% of the population, followed by (number of persons and percentage of population in brackets) Bengali (255,488/20.27%), Urdu (147,685/ 11.72%), Odia (70,206/ 5.56%), Santali (61,646/ 4.89%), Ho (42,142/ 3.34%), Punjabi (41,208/ 3.27), Maithili (28,285/ 2.24%), Telugu (21,880/ 1.74), Mundari (13,514/ 1.07%), Kurukh (5,501/ 0.44%), Tamil (5,241/ 0.42%), Gujarati (5,052/ 0.40%), Nepali (2,696/ 0.21%), Malayalam (2,170/ 0.17), Marathi (2,127/ 0.17), English (838/ 0.07%), Munda (760/0.06%), Bhumij, (738/ 0.06%), Kharia 620/0.05%) and persons with other languages as mother-tongue (2,685/ 0.21%). Hindi speakers included 123,489 persons having Bhojpuri as mother-tongue and 11,652 persons having Chhattisgarhi as mother-tongue. Other languages included 404 persons having Sindhi as mother-tongue and 218 persons having Kannada as mother-tongue.

Hindi is the official language in Jharkhand and Urdu has been declared as an additional official language.

Religion in Golmuri-cum-Jugsalai CD block (2011)
Hinduism	72.53%
Islam	13.79%
Sarna	8.43%
Sikhism	2.94%
Christianity	2.03%
Other or not stated	0.26%

According to the Population by Religious Communities 2011 data, in the Golmuri-cum-Jugsalai subdistrict, Hindus numbered 913,964 and formed 72.53% of the population, followed by (number of persons and percentage of population in brackets) Muslims (173,759/ 13.79%), Christians (25,557/ 2.03%), Other religious communities (145,664/11.56%), and persons who did not state their religion (1,257/ 0.10%).

== Economy ==
=== Overview ===
NITI Aayog (National Institution for Transforming India) has released the National Multidimensional Poverty Index (NMPI) baseline report in November 2021. “MPI is calculated using 12 segments - nutrition, child and adolescent mortality, antenatal care, years of schooling, school attendance, cooking fuel, sanitation, drinking water, electricity, housing, assets and bank account, as compared to the previous approach of just considering the poverty line”. Approximately 25.01% population of the country was multidimensionally poor. State-wise Bihar was the poorest with 51.91% of the population being poor, followed by Jharkhand with 42.16% of the population being poor. The silver lining in this scenario is that within Jharkhand, the richest districts are East Singhbhum, Dhanbad, Bokaro, and Ranchi. These districts are having industries and/or mining activity. However, CD blocks still largely dependent on agriculture have remained traditional.

=== Livelihood ===
Livelihood
in Golmuri-cum-Jugsalai CD block
1. Cultivators (1.64%)
2. Agricultural labourers (1.83%)
3. Household industries (1.97%)
4. Other Workers (94.6%)

In Golmuri-cum-Jugsalai CD block in 2011, amongst the class of total workers, cultivators numbered 6,392 and formed 1.64%, agricultural labourers numbered 7,120 and formed 1.83%, household industry workers numbered 7,682 and formed 1.97% and other workers numbered 368,589 and formed 94.56%. Total workers numbered 389,783 and formed 30.93% of the total population non-workers numbered 870,418 and formed 69.07% of the population.

=== Infrastructure ===
There are 83 inhabited villages in Golmuri-cum-Jugsalai CD block. In 2011, 81 villages had power supply. 10 villages had tap water, 73 villages had well water (covered/ uncovered), 83 villages had hand pumps, and all villages have drinking water facility. 18 villages had post offices, 8 villages had sub post offices, 11 villages had telephone (land line), 56 villages had mobile phone coverage. 83 villages had pucca (paved) village roads, 19 villages had bus service (public/ private), 7 villages had autos/ modified autos, 9 villages had taxi/ vans, 26 villages had tractors. 7 villages had bank branches, 8 village had agricultural credit society, 1 village had cinema/ video hall, 38 villages had availability of newspapers, 62 villages had ration shops, 37 villages had weekly haat, 63 villages had assembly polling stations.

== Education ==
Golmuri-cum-Jugsalai CD block had 15 villages with pre-primary schools, 80 villages with primary schools, 39 villages with middle schools, 13 villages with secondary schools, 1 village with senior secondary school, 3 villages with no educational facility. (Note: Senior secondary schools are also known as Inter colleges in Jharkhand)

== Healthcare ==
Golmuri-cum-Jugsalai CD block had 2 villages with primary health centres, 7 villages with primary health subcentres, 2 villages with maternity and child welfares centres, 2 villages with allopathic hospitals, 1 village with dispensary, 3 villages with medicine shops. (Note: Private medical practitioners, alternative medicine etc. not included.)
