= Chhota Gobindpur =

Chhota Gobindpur Chhota Govindpur
- Census Town
- Location in Jharkhand, India Chhota Gobindpur (India)
- Coordinates: 22.7601°N 86.2537°E
- Country: India
- State: Jharkhand
- District: Purbi Singhbhum
  - Rank: 2.63

Population (2011)
  - Total: 31,843

Languages*
  - Official: Hindi, Urdu
- Time zone: UTC+5:30 (IST)
- PIN: 831015
- Telephone/STD code: 0657
- Vehicle registration: JH 05
- Literacy: 89.31%
- Lok Sabha constituency: Jamshedpur
- Vidhan Sabha constituency: Jugsalai
- Website: jamshedpur.nic.in

Chhota Gobindpur (also spelled Chhota Govindpur) is a census town in the Golmuri-cum-Jugsalai CD block in the Dhalbhum subdivision of the Purbi Singhbhum district in the state of Jharkhand, India.

== Geography ==
Jamshedpur Urban Agglomeration
M: municipality, OG: outgrowth, CT: census town, T: tourist centre
Owing to space constraints in the small map, the actual locations in a larger map may vary slightly
For East Singhbhum district location map see Ghatshila or Musabani page

=== Location ===
Chhota Gobindpur is located at 22.7601°N 86.2537°E.

=== Jamshedpur Urban Agglomeration ===
With its recognition as an industrial town as early as the 1911 census, Jamshedpur was set on the road of steady population growth, as large number of emigrants flocked in for work opportunities. While in the earlier decades the central nucleus grew, in the later decades towns around Jamshedpur grew rapidly. In 2011, Jamshedpur Urban Agglomeration included 13 urban centres, with a total population of 1.3 million people. However, in more recent years, Jamshedpur UA “has lacked the growth and development observed around other similar industrial towns in western and southern India.”

Note: The map alongside presents the Jamshedpur Urban Agglomeration. All places marked in the map are linked in the larger full screen map.

== Civic administration ==
There is a police station at Gobindpur.

== Demographics ==
According to the 2011 Census of India, Chhota Govindpur had a total population of 31,843, of which 16.768 (53%) were males and 15,075 (47%) were females. Population in the age range 0-6 years was 4,021. The total number of literate persons in Chhota Govindpur was 24,847 (89.31% of the population over 6 years).

(*For language details see Golmuri-cum-Jugsalai block#Language and religion)

Jamshedpur Urban Agglomeration includes: Jamshedpur (Industrial Town), Jamshedpur (NAC), Tata Nagar Railway Colony (OG), Mango (NAC), Jugsalai (M), Bagbera (CT), Chhota Gobindpur (CT), Haludbani (CT), Sarjamda (CT), Gadhra (CT), Ghorabandha (CT), Purihasa (CT), Adityapur (M Corp.), Chota Gamahria (CT) and Kapali (CT).

As of 2001 India census, Chhota Govindpur had a population of 24,751. Males constitute 53% of the population and females 47%. Chhota Govindpur has an average literacy rate of 76%, higher than the national average of 59.5%; with male literacy of 82% and female literacy of 69%. 12% of the population is under 6 years of age. Hindi is the most widely spoken language while Bengali and Santhali are also spoken by many people.

== Infrastructure ==
According to the District Census Handbook 2011, Purbi Singhbhum, Chhota Gobindpur covered an area of 2.63 km^{2} (1.02 sq mi). It has an annual rainfall of 1,030.2 mm (40.56 in). Among the civic amenities, it had 16 km (9.9 mi) of roads with both closed and open drains, the protected water supply involved tube well/ bore well, handpump, overhead tank. It had 5,557 domestic electric connections, 63 road lighting points. Among the medical facilities, it had 8 hospitals, 2 dispensaries, 2 health centres, 20 family welfare centres, 18 maternity and child welfare centres, 19 maternity homes, 2 nursing homes, 2 charitable hospitals/ nursing homes, 18 veterinary hospitals. Among the educational facilities it had 13 primary schools, 8 middle schools, 5 secondary schools, 3 senior secondary schools, the nearest general degree college at Jamshedpur, 19 km (12 mi) away. It produced puffed rice. It had the branch offices of 1 nationalised bank, 1 private commercial bank, 1 cooperative bank, 1 agricultural credit society, 3 non-agricultural credit soc1eties.
