= Sarjamda =

- Census Town
- Location in Jharkhand, India Sarjamda (India)
- Coordinates: 22.75°N 86.23°E
- Country: India
- State: Jharkhand
- District: Purbi Singhbhum

Area
  - Total: 2.63 km^{2} (1.02 sq mi)

Population (2011)
  - Total: 23,788
  - Density: 9,040/km^{2} (23,400/sq mi)

Languages*
  - Official: Hindi, Urdu
- Time zone: UTC+5:30 (IST)
- PIN: 831002
- Telephone/STD code: 0657
- Vehicle registration: JH 05
- Literacy: 76.90%
- Lok Sabha constituency: Jamshedpur
- Vidhan Sabha constituency: Potka
- Website: jamshedpur.nic.in

Sarjamda is a census town in the Golmuri-cum-Jugsalai CD block in the Dhalbhum subdivision of the Purbi Singhbhum district in the Indian state of Jharkhand.

== Geography ==
Jamshedpur Urban Agglomeration
M: municipality, OG: outgrowth, CT: census town, T: tourist centre
Owing to space constraints in the small map, the actual locations in a larger map may vary slightly
For East Singhbhum district location map see Ghatshila or Musabani page

=== Location ===
Sarjamda is located at 22.75°N 86.23°E.

=== Jamshedpur Urban Agglomeration ===
With its recognition as an industrial town as early as the 1911 census, Jamshedpur was set on the road of steady population growth, as large number of emigrants flocked in for work opportunities. While in the earlier decades the central nucleus grew, in the later decades towns around Jamshedpur grew rapidly. In 2011, Jamshedpur Urban Agglomeration included 13 urban centres, with a total population of 1.3 million people. However, in more recent years, Jamshedpur UA “has lacked the growth and development observed around other similar industrial towns in western and southern India.”

Note: The map alongside presents the Jamshedpur Urban Agglomeration. All places marked in the map are linked in the larger full screen map.

== Demographics ==
According to the 2011 Census, Sarijamda town had a total of 4,970 households and a population of 23,788, with 51.1% males and 48.9% females. The Scheduled Caste (SC) population comprised 5.8% (1,370) of the total, while the Scheduled Tribe (ST) population constituted 50% (11,894) of the population. Of the total population, 66.1% were literate, while 33.9% were illiterate. Population in the age range 0-6 years was 3,329, leaving this group the literate persons in Sarjamda was 15,733 (76.90% of the population over 6 years). The town had 31.1% of its population engaged in some form of work, with 28.6% being main workers and 2.3% marginal workers. There were 68.9% non-workers, with 26.0% being male and 42.8% female.

Languages spoken in Sarjamda census town (2011)
1. Santali (26.2%)
2. Bengali (18.3%)
3. Hindi (15.0%)
4. Ho (11.0%)
5. Bhojpuri (6.80%)
6. Mundari (6.70%)
7. Odia (6.40%)
8. Magahi (2.10%)
9. Maithili (1.40%)
10. Munda (0.80%)
11. Other (5.30%)

Jamshedpur Urban Agglomeration includes: Jamshedpur (Industrial Town), Jamshedpur (NAC), Tata Nagar Railway Colony (OG), Mango (NAC), Jugsalai (M), Bagbera (CT), Chhota Gobindpur (CT), Haludbani (CT), Sarjamda (CT), Gadhra (CT), Ghorabandha (CT), Purihasa (CT), Adityapur (M Corp.), Chota Gamahria (CT) and Kapali (CT).

As of 2001 India census, Sarjamda had a population of 18,373. Males constitute 51% of the population and females 49%. Sarjamda has an average literacy rate of 60%, higher than the national average of 59.5%: male literacy is 71%, and female literacy is 48%. In Sarjamda, 15% of the population is under 6 years of age.

== Infrastructure ==
According to the District Census Handbook 2011, Purbi Singhbhum, Sarjamda covered an area of 2.63 km^{2} (1.02 sq mi). It has an annual rainfall of 1,030.2 mm (40.56 in). Among the civic amenities, it had 14 km (8.7 mi) of roads with both closed and open drains, the protected water supply involved hand pump, uncovered well. It had 3,496 domestic electric connections. Among the medical facilities, it had 10 hospitals, 10 dispensaries, 10 health centres, 5 family welfare centres, 10 maternity and child welfare centres, 10 maternity homes, 3 nursing homes, 2 charitable hospitals/ nursing homes, 5 veterinary hospitals, 8 medicine shops. Among the educational facilities it had 11 primary schools, 2 middle schools, 1 secondary school, 1 senior secondary school, the nearest general degree college at Khasmahal, 3 km (1.9 mi) away. Among social, cultural and recreational facilities, it had 1 cinema theatre, 1 auditorium/ community hall. Three important commodities it produced were bread, agarbatti, paper plate. It had the branch offices of 1 nationalised bank, 2 cooperative banks.
