= Purihasa =

- Census Town
- Location in Jharkhand, India Purihasa (India)
- Coordinates: 22.7463°N 86.1928°E
- Country: India
- State: Jharkhand
- District: Purbi Singhbhum

Area
  - Total: 2.23 km^{2} (0.86 sq mi)

Population (2011)
  - Total: 7,897
  - Density: 3,540/km^{2} (9,170/sq mi)

Languages*
  - Official: Hindi, Urdu
- Time zone: UTC+5:30 (IST)
- PIN: 832107
- Telephone/STD code: 0657
- Vehicle registration: JH 05
- Literacy: 74.38%
- Lok Sabha constituency: Jamshedpur
- Vidhan Sabha constituency: Potka
- Website: jamshedpur.nic.in

Purihasa is a census town in the Golmuri-cum-Jugsalai CD block in the Dhalbhum subdivision of the Purbi Singhbhum district in the Indian state of Jharkhand.

== Geography ==
Jamshedpur Urban Agglomeration
M: municipality, OG: outgrowth, CT: census town, T: tourist centre
Note: Owing to space constraints in the small map, the actual locations in a larger map may vary slightly.
For East Singhbhum district location map see Ghatshila or Musabani page.

=== Location ===
Purihasa is located at 22.7463°N 86.1928°E.

Physical Aspects
Rainfall (in mm)	Temperature(in centigrade)(Maximum)	Temperature(in centigrade)(Minimum)
1030.2	45.8	10

=== Jamshedpur Urban Agglomeration ===
With its recognition as an industrial town as early as the 1911 census, Jamshedpur was set on the road of steady population growth, as large number of emigrants flocked in for work opportunities. While in the earlier decades the central nucleus grew, in the later decades towns around Jamshedpur grew rapidly. In 2011, Jamshedpur Urban Agglomeration included 13 urban centres, with a total population of 1.3 million people. However, in more recent years, Jamshedpur UA "has lacked the growth and development observed around other similar industrial towns in western and southern India."

== Civic administration ==
Sundarnagar police station serves the area.

== Demographics ==
According to the 2011 Census, Purihasa town had a total of 1,711 households and a population of 7,897, with 51.3% males and 48.7% females. The Scheduled Caste (SC) population comprised 101 (1.3%) of the total, while the Scheduled Tribe (ST) population constituted 5,081 (64.4%) of the population. Of the total population, 63.6% were literate, while 36.4% were illiterate. Population in the age range 0-6 years was 1,141, leaving this group the literate persons in Purihasa was 5,025 (74.38% of the population over 6 years). The town had 31.1% of its population engaged in some form of work, with 27.2% being main workers and 3.7% marginal workers. There were 68.9% non-workers, with 26.4% being male and 42.5% female.

Purihasa census town is part of Jamshedpur Urban Agglomeration, which includes: Jamshedpur (Industrial Town), Jamshedpur (NAC), Tata Nagar Railway Colony (OG), Mango (NAC), Jugsalai (M), Bagbera (CT), Chhota Gobindpur (CT), Haludbani (CT), Sarjamda (CT), Gadhra (CT), Ghorabandha (CT), Adityapur (M Corp.), Chota Gamahria (CT) and Kapali (CT).

=== Language ===
Languages spoken in Purihasa census town (2011)
1. Santali (47.9%)
2. Bengali (13.1%)
3. Ho (11.9%)
4. Hindi (7.30%)
5. Odia (4.30%)
6. Bhojpuri (4.20%)
7. Punjabi (2.40%)
8. Mundari (2.30%)
9. Other (6.60%)

=== Religion ===
Religions in Purihasa town (2011)
Religion	Percent
Unclassified Sect.	62.6%
Hinduism	32.7%
Christianity	2.6%
Sikhism	1.8%
Islam	0.2%
Not stated	0.1%

== Infrastructure ==
According to the District Census Handbook 2011, Purbi Singhbhum, Purihasa covered an area of 2.23 km^{2} (0.86 sq mi). It has an annual rainfall of 1,030.2 mm (40.56 in). Among the civic amenities, it had 4 km (2.5 mi) of roads with open drains, the protected water supply involved tap water from treated sources, tube well/ bore well, overhead tank. It had 1,339 domestic electric connections, 4 road lighting points. Among the medical facilities, it had 2 hospitals, 1 dispensary, 1 health centre, 1 family welfare centre, 1 maternity and child welfare centre, 2 maternity homes, 1 nursing home, 1 veterinary hospital, 3 medicine shops. Among the educational facilities it had 4 primary schools, 2 middle schools, 2 secondary schools, 1 senior secondary school, 1 general degree college. It had 1 non-formal education centre (Sarva Shiksha Abhiyan). Among social, cultural and recreational facilities, it had 1 stadium. It had the branch offices of 1 nationalised bank, 1 cooperative bank.

== Transport ==
State Highway 6 passes through Purihasa.

== Education ==
Type of educational institution
Primary	Middle	matriculation	senior secondary
4	2	2	1

Lal Bahadur Shastri Memorial College was established in 1971 at Karandih.
