= Gadhra =

- Census Town
- Location in Jharkhand, India Gadhra (India)
- Coordinates: 22.7418°N 86.2436°E
- Country: India
- State: Jharkhand
- District: Purbi Singhbhum

Area
  - Total: 4.48 km^{2} (1.73 sq mi)

Population (2011)
  - Total: 18,801
  - Density: 4,200/km^{2} (10,900/sq mi)

Languages*
  - Official: Hindi, Urdu
- Time zone: UTC+5:30 (IST)
- PIN: 831002
- Telephone/STD code: 0657
- Vehicle registration: JH 05
- Literacy: 81.63%
- Lok Sabha constituency: Jamshedpur
- Vidhan Sabha constituency: Potka
- Website: jamshedpur.nic.in

Gadhra is a census town in the Golmuri-cum-Jugsalai CD block in the Dhalbhum subdivision of the Purbi Singhbhum district in the state of Jharkhand, India.

== Geography ==
Jamshedpur Urban Agglomeration
M: municipality, OG: outgrowth, CT: census town, T: tourist centre
Owing to space constraints in the small map, the actual locations in a larger map may vary slightly
For East Singhbhum district location map see Ghatshila or Musabani page

=== Location ===
Gadhra is located at 22.7418°N 86.2436°E.

=== Jamshedpur Urban Agglomeration ===
With its recognition as an industrial town as early as the 1911 census, Jamshedpur was set on the road of steady population growth, as large number of emigrants flocked in for work opportunities. While in the earlier decades the central nucleus grew, in the later decades towns around Jamshedpur grew rapidly. In 2011, Jamshedpur Urban Agglomeration included 13 urban centres, with a total population of 1.3 million people. However, in more recent years, Jamshedpur UA “has lacked the growth and development observed around other similar industrial towns in western and southern India.”

Note: The map alongside presents the Jamshedpur Urban Agglomeration. All places marked in the map are linked in the larger full screen map.

== Demographics ==
According to the 2011 Census of India, Gadhra had a total population of 18,801, of which 9,837 (52%) were males and 8,964 (48%) were females. Population in the age range 0-6 years was 2,550. The total number of literate persons in Gadhra was 13,266 (81.63% of the population over 6 years).

(*For language details see Golmuri-cum-Jugsalai block#Language and religion)

Jamshedpur Urban Agglomeration includes: Jamshedpur (Industrial Town), Jamshedpur (NAC), Tata Nagar Railway Colony (OG), Mango (NAC), Jugsalai (M), Bagbera (CT), Chhota Gobindpur (CT), Haludbani (CT), Sarjamda (CT), Gadhra (CT), Ghorabandha (CT), Purihasa (CT), Adityapur (M Corp.), Chota Gamahria (CT) and Kapali (CT).

As of 2001 India census, Gadhra had a population of 15,742. Males constitute 53% of the population and females 47%. Gadhra has an average literacy rate of 65%, higher than the national average of 59.5%: male literacy is 75%, and female literacy is 55%. In Gadhra, 14% of the population is under 6 years of age.

== Infrastructure ==
According to the District Census Handbook 2011, Purbi Singhbhum, Gadhra covered an area of 4.48 km^{2} (1.73 sq mi). It has an annual rainfall of 1,030.2 mm (40.56 in). Among the civic amenities, it had 14 km (8.7 mi) of roads with open drains, the protected water supply involved hand pump, uncovered well. It had 3,228 domestic electric connections. Among the medical facilities, it had 2 hospitals, 2 dispensaries, 2 health centres, 18 family welfare centres, 18 maternity and child welfare centres, 16 maternity homes, 3 nursing homes, 4 veterinary hospitals, 5 medicine shops. Among the educational facilities it had 7 primary schools, 4 middle schools, 2 secondary schools, 1 senior secondary school, the nearest general degree college at Karandih, 7 km (4.3 mi) away. Two important commodities it produced were cement, iron. It had the branch offices of 1 nationalised bank, 1 private commercial bank, 1 cooperative bank, 12 non-agricultural credit soc1eties.
