= Chota Gamahria =

Chhota Gamharia
- Census Town
- Location in Jharkhand, India Chhota Gamharia (India)
- Coordinates: 22.8201°N 86.0987°E
- Country: India
- State: Jharkhand
- District: Seraikela Kharsawan

Government
  - Type: Federal democracy

Area
  - Total: 2.07 km^{2} (0.80 sq mi)

Population (2011)
  - Total: 7,505
  - Density: 3,630/km^{2} (9,390/sq mi)

Languages *
  - Official: Hindi, Bengali
- Time zone: UTC+5:30 (IST)
- PIN: 832108
- Telephone/ STD code: 0657
- Vehicle registration: JH 05
- Literacy: 88.48%
- Lok Sabha constituency: Singhbhum
- Vidhan Sabha constituency: Seraikella
- Website: seraikela.nic.in

Chota Gamharia (also spelled Gamahria or Gamaria) is a census town in the Adityapur CD block in the Seraikela Sadar subdivision of the Seraikela Kharsawan district in the Indian state of Jharkhand.

== Geography ==
Jamshedpur Urban Agglomeration
M: municipality, OG: outgrowth, CT: census town, T: tourist centre
Owing to space constraints in the small map, the actual locations in a larger map may vary slightly
For Seraikela Kharsawan district location map see Saraikela page

=== Location ===
Chota Gamaria is located at 22.8201°N 86.0987°E.

=== Jamshedpur Urban Agglomeration ===
With its recognition as an industrial town as early as the 1911 census, Jamshedpur was set on the road of steady population growth, as large number of emigrants flocked in for work opportunities. While in the earlier decades the central nucleus grew, in the later decades towns around Jamshedpur grew rapidly. In 2011, Jamshedpur Urban Agglomeration included 13 urban centres, with a total population of 1.3 million people. However, in more recent years, Jamshedpur UA "has lacked the growth and development observed around other similar industrial towns in western and southern India."

Note: The map alongside presents the Jamshedpur Urban Agglomeration. All places marked in the map are linked in the larger full screen map.

== Civic administration ==
There is a police station at Gamharia.

== Demographics ==
According to the 2011 Census of India, Chota Gamahria had a total population of 7,505, of which 4,033 (54%) were males and 3,472 (46%) were females. Population in the age range 0-6 years was 970. The total number of literate persons in Chota Gamahria was 5,782 (88.48% of the population over 6 years).

(*For language details see Adityapur block#Language and religion)

Jamshedpur Urban Agglomeration includes: Jamshedpur (Industrial Town), Jamshedpur (NAC), Tata Nagar Railway Colony (OG), Mango (NAC), Jugsalai (M), Bagbera (CT), Chhota Gobindpur (CT), Haludbani (CT), Sarjamda (CT), Gadhra (CT), Ghorabandha (CT), Purihasa (CT), Adityapur (M Corp.), Chota Gamahria (CT) and Kapali (CT).

== Infrastructure ==
According to the District Census Handbook 2011, Seraikela Kharsawan, Chota Gamahria covered an area of 2.07 km^{2} (0.80 sq mi). It has an annual rainfall of 1,086.1 mm (42.76 in). Among the civic amenities, it had six km (3.7 mi) of roads with both closed and open drains. The protected water supply involved tube well/ bore well, hand pump, overhead tank. It had 1,588 domestic electric connections. Among the medical facilities, it had 5 hospitals, 1 dispensary, 1 health centre, 1 family welfare centre, 1 maternity and child welfare centre, 1 maternity home, 1 nursing home, 1 charitable hospital/ nursing home, 1 veterinary hospital, 4 medicine shops. Among the educational facilities it had 4 primary schools, 1 middle school, 1 secondary school, other educational facilities at Jamshedpurfifteen km (9.3 mi) away. It had 1 polytechnic. Among social, cultural and recreational facilities, it had 1 cinema theatre, 1 auditorium/ community hall, 1 public library, 1 reading room. Three important commodities it produced were bell metal utensils, gold jewellery, mask making. It had the branch offices of 6 nationalised banks, 1 private commercial bank, 1 co-operative bank, 1 agricultural credit society.

== Transport ==
There is a station at Gamharia on the Tatanagar-Bilaspur section of the Howrah-Nagpur-Mumbai line.

== Education ==
Arka Jain University, is a private university at Mohanpur, Gamharia, established in 2011. It offers 25 courses across 10 streams.

MSME Tool Room (Indo Danish Tool Room), Jamshedpur Main Centre, located at Gamharia, offers diploma, certificate and skill development programmes.

XITE (Xavier Institute of Tribal Education) College was established at Gamharia by the Jamshedpur Jesuit Society in 2003 initially as a coaching centre, "but in 2007 it began to offer degree programmes BBA (Bachelor of Business Administration) and subsequently B.Com (Bachelor of Commerce Honors) and other programmes." XITE College is one of the units of Xavier Colleges. It has a 34.5-acre campus with hostels, sports facilities etc. "The College provides additional facilities such as training in CAT, XAT, GMAT, Banking, Railway, Tally, and other competitive examinations to its students".

Government High School at Chota Gamahria is a Hindi-medium coeducational institution established in 1960. It has facilities for teaching in classes IX and XII. The school has a playground.
