= Tata Nagar Railway Colony =

- Out growth
- Location in Jharkhand, India Tata Nagar Railway Colony (India)
- Coordinates: 22.769344°N 86.195278°E
- Country: India
- State: Jharkhand
- District: Purbi Singhbhum

Population (2011)
  - Total: 45,986

Languages*
  - Official: Hindi, Urdu
- Time zone: UTC+5:30 (IST)
- PIN: 831002
- Telephone/STD code: 0657
- Vehicle registration: JH 05
- Literacy: 78.29%
- Lok Sabha constituency: Jamshedpur
- Vidhan Sabha constituency: Jugsalai
- Website: jamshedpur.nic.in

Tata Nagar Railway Colony is an Out growth in the Golmuri-cum-Jugsalai CD block in the Dhalbhum subdivision of the Purbi Singhbhum district in the Indian state of Jharkhand.

== Geography ==
Jamshedpur Urban Agglomeration
M: municipality, OG: outgrowth, CT: census town, T: tourist centre
Owing to space constraints in the small map, the actual locations in a larger map may vary slightly
For East Singhbhum district location map see Ghatshila or Musabani page

=== Location ===
Tata Nagar Railway Colony is located at 22.769344°N 86.195278°E.

=== Jamshedpur Urban Agglomeration ===
With its recognition as an industrial town as early as the 1911 census, Jamshedpur was set on the road of steady population growth, as large number of emigrants flocked in for work opportunities. While in the earlier decades the central nucleus grew, in the later decades towns around Jamshedpur grew rapidly. In 2011, Jamshedpur Urban Agglomeration included 13 urban centres, with a total population of 1.3 million people. However, in more recent years, Jamshedpur UA "has lacked the growth and development observed around other similar industrial towns in western and southern India."

Note: The map alongside presents the Jamshedpur Urban Agglomeration. All places marked in the map are linked in the larger full screen map.

== Demographics ==
According to the 2011 Census of India, Tata Nagar Railway Colony had a total population of 45,986, of which 24,376 (53%) were males and 21,610 (47%) were females. Population in the age range 0-6 years was 6,250. The total number of literate persons in Tata Nagar Railway Colony was 31,508 (79.29% of the population over 6 years).

(*For language details see Golmuri-cum-Jugsalai block#Language and religion)

Jamshedpur Urban Agglomeration includes: Jamshedpur (Industrial Town), Jamshedpur (NAC), Tata Nagar Railway Colony (OG), Mango (NAC), Jugsalai (M), Bagbera (CT), Chhota Gobindpur (CT), Haludbani (CT), Sarjamda (CT), Gadhra (CT), Ghorabandha (CT), Purihasa (CT), Adityapur (M Corp.), Chota Gamahria (CT) and Kapali (CT).
