= Mango (Jamshedpur) =

- City and neighborhood
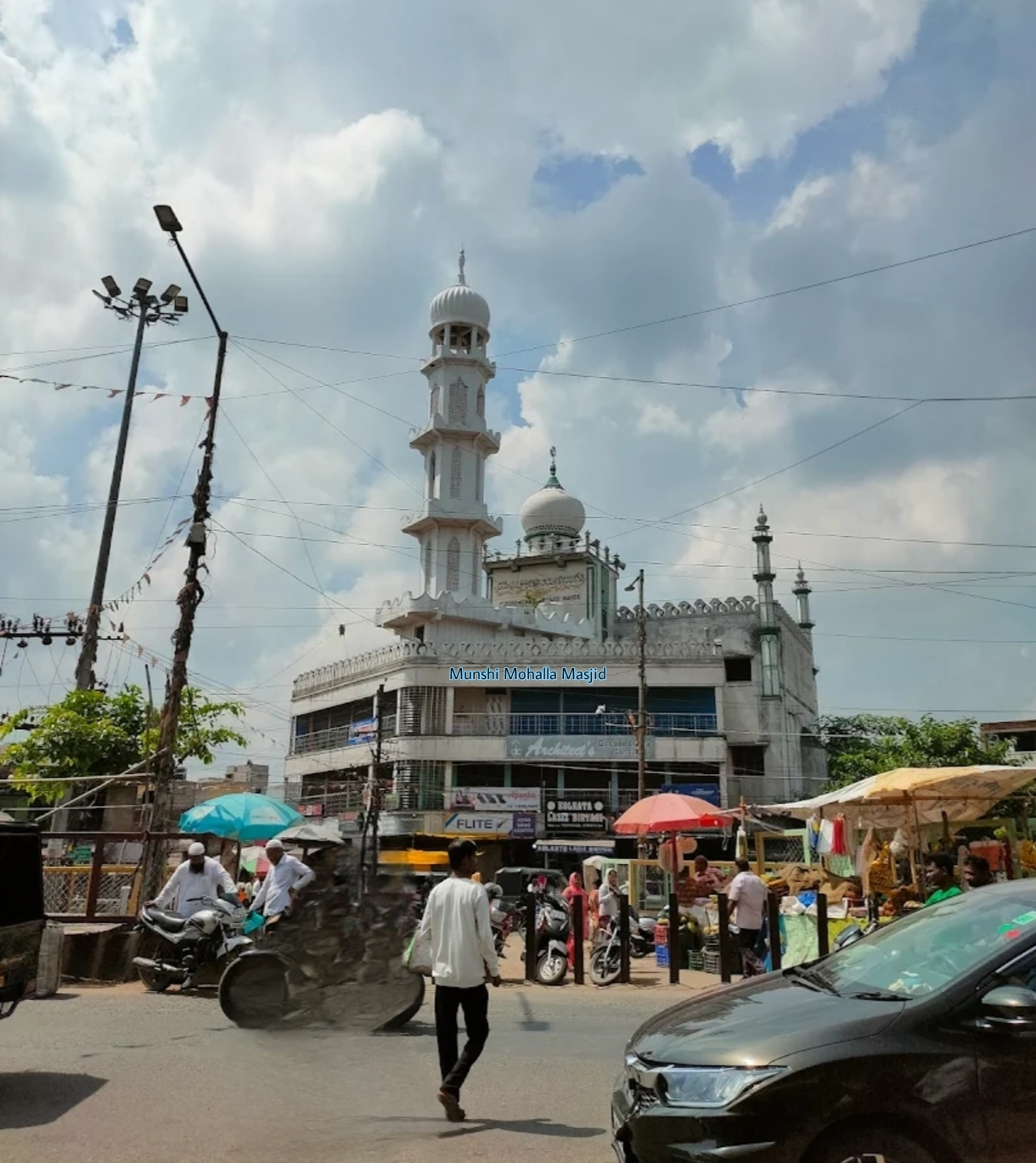
- Munshi Mohalla Masjid

- Location in Jharkhand, India Mango (India)
- Coordinates: 22°49′39″N 86°12′59″E
- Country: India
- State: Jharkhand
- District: East Singhbhum

Government
  - Type: Municipal Corporation
  - Body: Mango Municipal Corporation

Area
  - Total: 18.03 km^{2} (6.96 sq mi)

Population (2011)
  - Total: 223,805
  - Density: 12,410/km^{2} (32,150/sq mi)

Languages*
  - Official: Hindi, Urdu
- Time zone: UTC+5:30 (IST)
- PIN: 831012, 831018, 832110
- Vehicle registration: JH
- Website: https://udhd.jharkhand.gov.in/ULB/mango/mango.aspx

Mango is a suburb in Jamshedpur, Jharkhand. The city is situated across the Subarnarkeha River and is connected to Jamshedpur via three bridges laid side by side. It is a huge and growing residential area. Once a less populated little town in the Dhalbhum subdivision of the East Singhbhum district, it is now a booming neighbourhood and real estate hotbed.

It has the status of a 'city' according to the government through being an important part of the main city Jamshedpur and its metropolitan area. The city is classified as a notified area and is run by its own notified area committee, namely, Mango Notified Area Committee (MNAC). The electricity services are provided by the state-run electricity board Jharkhand Bijli Vitran Nigam Limited (JBVNL).

Despite witnessing a drastic rise in infrastructure and housing projects, this area has been plagued with one of the highest crime rates in the city of Jamshedpur. Termed "the crime hub of Jamshedpur" by local news websites and journalists, this area has witnessed a significant rise in crime rates since the early noughties, Blocks like Ulidih, Azadnagar and Shankusai (Sankosai) being the centres of violent crimes including thefts, shootings and stabbings.

== Geography ==
Jamshedpur Urban Agglomeration
M: municipality, OG: outgrowth, CT: census town, T: tourist centre
Owing to space constraints in the small map, the actual locations in a larger map may vary slightly
For East Singhbhum district location map see Ghatshila or Musabani page

=== Location ===
Mango is located at 22°49′39″N 86°12′59″E.

=== Jamshedpur Urban Agglomeration ===
With its recognition as an industrial town as early as the 1911 census, Jamshedpur was set on the road of steady population growth, as large number of emigrants flocked in for work opportunities. While in the earlier decades the central nucleus grew, in the later decades towns around Jamshedpur grew rapidly. In 2011, Jamshedpur Urban Agglomeration included 13 urban centres, with a total population of 1.3 million people. However, in more recent years, Jamshedpur UA "has lacked the growth and development observed around other similar industrial towns in western and southern India."

Note: The map alongside presents the Jamshedpur Urban Agglomeration. All places marked in the map are linked in the larger full screen map.

== Civic administration ==
There is a police station at Mango. https://udhd.jharkhand.gov.in Mango Municipal Corporation

== Demographics ==
According to the 2011 Census of India, Mango had a total population of 223,805, of which 115,970 (52%) were males and 107,835 (48%) were females. Population in the age range 0–6 years was 29,338. The total number of literate persons in Mango was 166,870 (85.81% of the population over 6 years).

Jamshedpur Urban Agglomeration includes: Jamshedpur (Industrial Town), Jamshedpur (NAC), Tata Nagar Railway Colony (OG), Mango (NAC), Jugsalai (M), Bagbera (CT), Chhota Gobindpur (CT), Haludbani (CT), Sarjamda (CT), Gadhra (CT), Ghorabandha(CT), Purihasa (CT), Adityapur (M Corp.), Chota Gamahria (CT) and Kapali (CT).

As of 2001 India census, Mango had a population of 166,091. Males constitute 53% of the population and females 47%. Mango has an average literacy rate of 70%, higher than the national average of 59.5%: male literacy is 76%, and female literacy is 63%. In Mango, 14% of the population is under 6 years of age.

Religion in Mango NAC (2011)
Religion	Percent
Hinduism	52.34%
Islam	40.85%
Sarna	2.89%
Christianity	1.92%
Sikhism	1.88%
Other or not stated	0.12%

=== Languages ===
Languages spoken in Mango NAC (2011)
1. Urdu (37.6%)
2. Hindi (31.5%)
3. Bengali (15.5%)
4. Bhojpuri (3.82%)
5. Punjabi (1.91%)
6. Ho (1.69%)
7. Odia (1.61%)
8. Magahi (1.37%)
9. Santali (1.18%)
10. Others (3.75%)

== Economy ==
Mango's economy is mostly based on real estate and it is the largest hotspot for this sector. Apart from that Mango's economy is mostly based on motor parts manufacturing, selling & repairs and transportation. However, in recent years the area has also become a destination of information technology (IT) and business processing outsource (BPO). Aegis have a campus in Maango which employees around 2000 peoples.

Mango also have industries like Jharkhand State Beverages Corp., Triveni Earthmovers etc.

== Education ==
=== Colleges ===
==== General ====
- Jamshedpur Worker's College
- J.K.S College
- Karim City College (Mango Campus)

===== Engineering =====
- Maryland Institute Of Technology & Management

====== Medical ======
- Awadh Dental College & Hospital
- Mahatma Gandhi Memorial Medical College, Jamshedpur

====== Polytechnic ======
- Al Kabir Polytechnic

==== Schools ====
- Kabir Memorial Urdu high school

==== University ====
- Netaji Subhas University
- Grace Bible College

== Transport ==
Many buses and auto-rickshaws operate from Sakchi, Jamshedpur to Mango on a regular basis. Tatanagar Junction railway station is the nearest railway station at a distance of 12 km.

== See also ==
- List of neighbourhoods of Jamshedpur
