= Garabasa =

Garabasa गाराबासा गाराबासा
- Town
- Location in Jharkhand, India Garabasa (India)
- Coordinates: 22°46′9″N 86°11′35″E
- Country: India
- State: Jharkhand
- District: Purbi Singhbhum district

Languages
  - Official: Hindi, Santali
- Time zone: UTC+5:30 (IST)
- PIN: 831002
- Telephone code: 91-0657
- Vehicle registration: JH 05

Garabasa is a part of Bagbera, a census town in Purbi Singhbhum district in the state of Jharkhand, India.
