= Ghorabandha =

- Census Town
- Location in Jharkhand, India Ghorabandha (India)
- Coordinates: 22.7791°N 86.2787°E
- Country: India
- State: Jharkhand
- District: Purbi Singhbhum

Area
  - Total: 3.23 km^{2} (1.25 sq mi)

Population (2011)
  - Total: 20,718
  - Density: 6,410/km^{2} (16,600/sq mi)

Languages*
  - Official: Hindi, Urdu
- Time zone: UTC+5:30 (IST)
- PIN: 831004
- Telephone/STD code: 0657
- Vehicle registration: JH 05
- Literacy: 86.42%
- Lok Sabha constituency: Jamshedpur
- Vidhan Sabha constituency: Potka
- Website: jamshedpur.nic.in

Ghorabandha is a census town in the Golmuri-cum-Jugsalai CD block in the Dhalbhum subdivision of the Purbi Singhbhum district in the Indian state of Jharkhand.

== Geography ==
Jamshedpur Urban Agglomeration
M: municipality, OG: outgrowth, CT: census town, T: tourist centre
Owing to space constraints in the small map, the actual locations in a larger map may vary slightly
For East Singhbhum district location map see Ghatshila or Musabani page

=== Location ===
Ghorabandha is located at 22.7791°N 86.2787°E.

=== Jamshedpur Urban Agglomeration ===
With its recognition as an industrial town as early as the 1911 census, Jamshedpur was set on the road to steady population growth, as large number of emigrants flocked in for work opportunities. While in the earlier decades the central nucleus grew, in the later decades towns around Jamshedpur grew rapidly. In 2011, Jamshedpur Urban Agglomeration included 13 urban centres, with a total population of 1.3 million people. However, in more recent years, Jamshedpur UA “has lacked the growth and development observed around other similar industrial towns in western and southern India.”

Note: The map alongside presents the Jamshedpur Urban Agglomeration. All places marked in the map are linked in the larger full screen map.

== Demographics ==
According to the 2011 Census of India, Ghorabandha had a total population of 20,718, of which 10,612 (51%) were males and 10.106 (49%) were females. Population in the age range 0–6 years was 2,588. The total number of literate persons in Ghorabandha was 15,668 (86.42% of the population over 6 years).

(*For language details see Golmuri-cum-Jugsalai block#Language and religion)

Jamshedpur Urban Agglomeration includes: Jamshedpur (Industrial Town), Jamshedpur (NAC), Tata Nagar Railway Colony (OG), Mango (NAC), Jugsalai (M), Bagbera (CT), Chhota Gobindpur (CT), Haludbani (CT), Sarjamda (CT), Gadhra (CT), Ghorabandha (CT), Purihasa (CT), Adityapur (M Corp.), Chota Gamahria (CT) and Kapali (CT).

As of 2001 the India census, Ghorabandha had a population of 14,751. Males constitute 52% of the population and females 48%. Ghorabandha has an average literacy rate of 75%, higher than the national average of 59.5%: male literacy is 81%, and female literacy is 69%. In Ghorabandha, 13% of the population is under 6 years of age.

== Infrastructure ==
According to the District Census Handbook 2011, Purbi Singhbhum, Ghorabandha covered an area of 3.23 km^{2} (1.25 sq mi). It has an annual rainfall of 1,030.2 mm (40.56 in). Among the civic amenities, it had 16 km (9.9 mi) of roads with both closed and open drains, the protected water supply involved tap water from treated sources, tube well/ bore well, overhead tank. It had 3,826 domestic electric connections, 160 road lighting points. Among the medical facilities, it had 3 hospitals, 8 dispensaries, 8 health centres, 4 family welfare centres, 3 maternity and child welfare centres, 3 maternity homes, 13 nursing homes, 2 charitable hospitals/ nursing homes, 3 veterinary hospitals, 5 medicine shops. Among the educational facilities it had 3 primary schools, 3 middle schools, 2 secondary schools, 1 senior secondary school, the nearest general degree college at Jamshedpur, 12 km (7.5 mi) away. It had the branch offices of 1 nationalised bank, 1 cooperative bank, 3 non-agricultural credit soc1eties.
