= Adityapur =

Suburb/Satellite city in Jharkhand, India

- Suburb / Satellite city
- Location in Jharkhand, India Adityapur (India)
- Coordinates: 22.7901°N 86.1657°E
- Country: India
- State or Union Territory: Jharkhand
- Metro/City/Town: Jamshedpur

Languages*
  - Official: Hindi, Urdu
- Time zone: UTC+5:30 (IST)
- PIN: 831013
- Telephone code: 0657
- Vehicle registration: JH 22
- Lok Sabha constituency: Singhbhum
- Vidhan Sabha constituency: Seraikella
- Website: seraikela.nic.in

Adityapur is a city and suburb in Jamshedpur, Jharkhand, India. It is a municipal corporation in the Seraikela Sadar subdivision in the Seraikela Kharsawan district. Adityapur is part of the Greater Jamshedpur, under the Indian government's Jawaharlal Nehru National Urban Renewal Mission (JNNURM). It is separated from Jamshedpur by the Kharkai River.

== History ==
Adityapur is named after Raja Aditya Pratap Singh Deo (1887-1969), the last ruler of Seraikela State. The region around Adityapur is rich in history. Patkum State's capital was at Ichagarh. In Ichagarh there is a cave and a century old temple. The Ichagarh Palace was the seat of Patkum State. It was established by the Scion of King Vikramaditya of Ujjain. This place hosts several historical places on the banks of rivers Karkari and Swarnarekha.

By the conquering of Kolhan by the British, a new district—Singhbhum district—was formed which corresponds to the modern Kolhan region. Owing to modern development in the time of British Empire, police stations were opened at Ichagarh, Patamda and Chandil. Previously this place was inhabited mainly by Santhalis, Odias and Bengalis (now Jharkhandis). The area came into prominence with the industrial development of Jamshedpur. Thus many peoples form other parts of India came an made the city's multicultural and cosmopolitan culture.

After independence, Adityapur came into existence. In 1972, the Bihar government (now the Jharkhand Government) notified Adityapur as an industrial area and a municipal corporation. Prior to Jharkhand's establishment, the original Jharkhandis were credited for the contribution to the state. Within few times, it developed rapidly as an industrial satellite city for the Jamshedpur metropolitan area. Various new projects are coming here now. Now Adityapur is one of the fastest growing satellite cities in India.

== Geography ==
Jamshedpur Urban Agglomeration
M: municipality, OG: outgrowth, CT: census town, T: tourist centre
Owing to space constraints in the small map, the actual locations in a larger map may vary slightly
For Seraikela Kharsawan district location map see Saraikela page

Adityapur is located at 22.7901°N 86.1657°E. Kharkai River surrounds Adityapur on three sides (except the west). Adityapur is connected, over the Kharkai River, to the city of Jamshedpur via a toll bridge through Kadma and Kharkai Bridge through Bistupur. Adityapur covered an area of 49 km^{2} (19 sq mi). It has an annual rainfall of 1,132.9 mm (44.60 in).

With its recognition as an industrial town as early as the 1911 census, Jamshedpur was set on the road of steady population growth, as a large number of emigrants flocked in for work opportunities. While in the earlier decades the central nucleus grew, in the later decades towns around Jamshedpur grew rapidly. In 2011, the Jamshedpur Urban Agglomeration included 13 urban centres, with a total population of 1.3 million people. However, in more recent years, the Jamshedpur metropolitan area has lacked the growth and development observed around other similar industrial cities in western and southern India.

Note: The map alongside presents the Jamshedpur Urban Agglomeration. All places marked in the map are linked in the larger full screen map.

== Civic administration ==
There is a police station at Adityapur. The headquarters of the Adityapur CD block are located at Adityapur city. The protected water supply involved tap water from treated sources, hand pumps, and overhead tanks. It had 31,710 domestic electric connections and 572 road lighting points.

== Demographics ==
According to the 2011 Census of India, Adityapur had a total population of 174,355 of which 91,664 (53%) were males and 82,691 (47%) were females. Population in the age range 0–6 years was 24,041. The total number of literate persons in Adityapur was 123,158 (81.93% of the population over 6 years.

=== Languages ===
Languages spoken in Adityapur City (2011)
1. Bengali (30.8%)
2. Hindi (24.2%)
3. Bhojpuri (13.3%)
4. Odia (6.88%)
5. Ho (5.64%)
6. Maithili (5.27%)
7. Others (2.75%)

(*For language details see Adityapur block#Language and religion)

The Jamshedpur Urban Agglomeration includes Jamshedpur (Industrial Town), Jamshedpur (NAC), Tata Nagar Railway Colony (OG), Mango (NAC), Jugsalai (M), Bagbera (CT), Chhota Gobindpur (CT), Haludbani (CT), Sarjamda (CT), Gadhra (CT), Ghorabandha (CT), Purihasa (CT), Adityapur (M Corp.), Chota Gamahria (CT) and Kapali (CT).

As of the India census, Adityapur had a population of 119,221. Males constitute 54% of the population and females 46%. Adityapur has an average literacy rate of 68%, higher than the national average of 59.5%; with 60% of males and 40% of females literate. 14% of the population is under 6 years of age.

== Infrastructure ==
Among the civic amenities, it had one hundred and ninety-two km (119 mi) of roads with open drains. Among the medical facilities, it had three hospitals (with 75 beds), four dispensaries, four health centres, one family welfare centre, two maternity and child welfare centres, two maternity homes, two nursing homes, two charitable hospital/nursing homes, two veterinary hospitals, and 12 medicine shops. Three important commodities it produced were bus body building, saria (iron), and iron ore process. It had the branch offices of 9 nationalised banks, two private commercial banks, three co-operative banks.

== Economy ==
Adityapur is one of the largest industrial centers in India, and a special economic zone is in the works through the Adityapur Industrial Development Authority. The Adityapur Industrial Estate (33,970 acres, 53 sq. mile) has been Asia's largest industrial hub for a while. About 1,000 industries are located here and about 250 are under construction. There are about 20 large scale industries such as Tata Growth Shop, Usha Martin, Omni Auto, LMT and RSB. The Estate has an average annual production of ₹ 4,950 Crores.

The city is also emerging as a tech cluster and information technology hub. Adityapur also has an information technology company which is IT-SCIENT. This is a company based in Noida. Adityapur houses several corporate firms. Adityapur industrial area is a large zone in the city of Adityapur, housing a large number of companies.

Adityapur Auto Cluster is an economic cluster. It is a major economic hub of the city. The City Residency Private Limited will set up a large mixed-use project, namely, The Onyx in the heart of Adityapur, with a shopping mall, a hotel, office, commercial, entertainment and residential spaces. It will be the first shopping mall of Adityapur.

== Transport ==
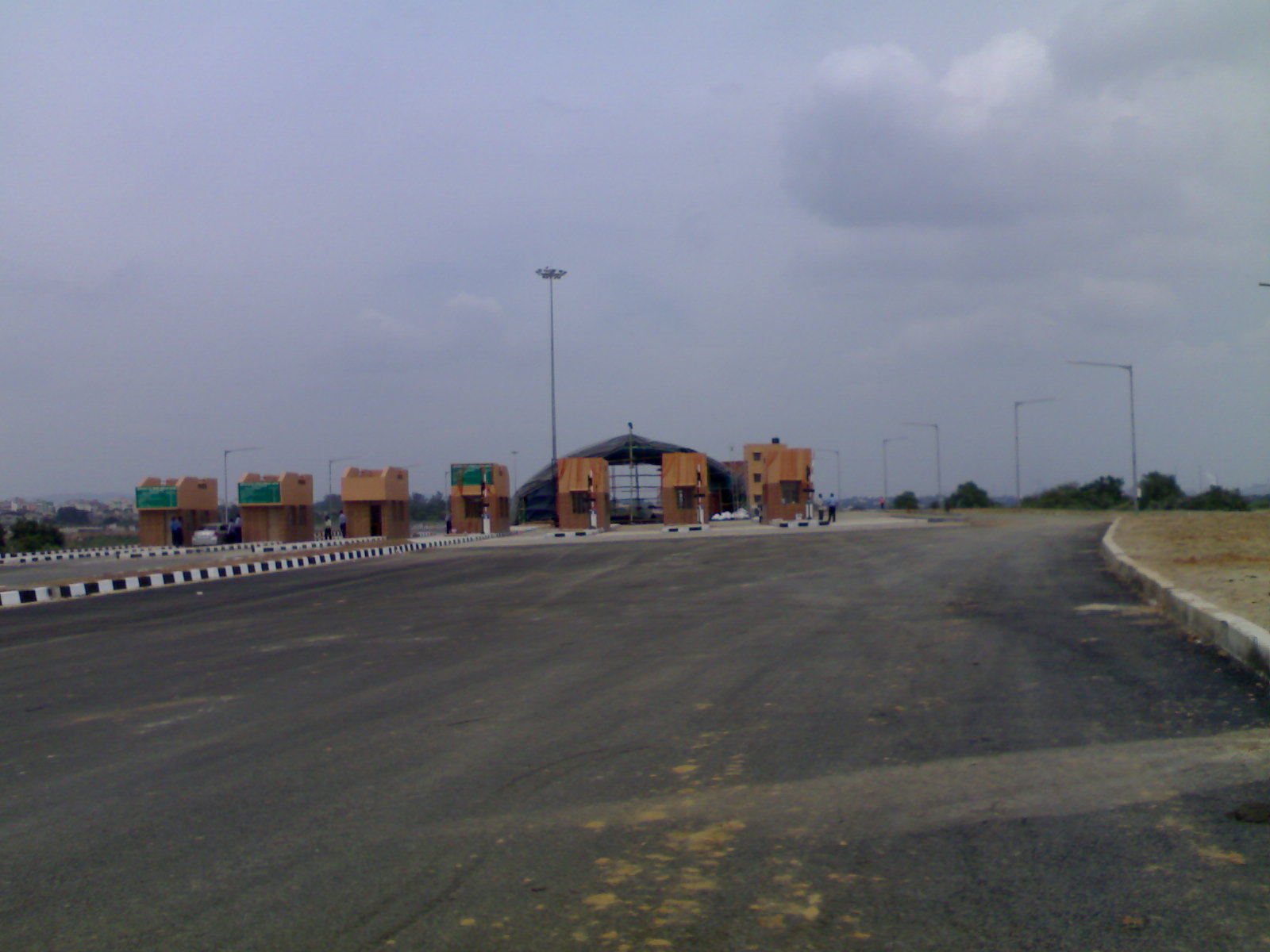
Adityapur Kadma Toll Bridge

- Adityapur railway station is located on the Tatanagar-Bilaspur section of the Howrah-Nagpur-Mumbai line and the Asansol-Tatanagar-Kharagpur line.
- Four-lane highway, (Adityapur - Kandra Road), connects Jamshedpur to Barbil via Seraikela and Chaibasa.
- The bridge between Kadma and Adityapur provides a shortcut to NH 18 via Marine Drive, Jamshedpur.

== Education ==
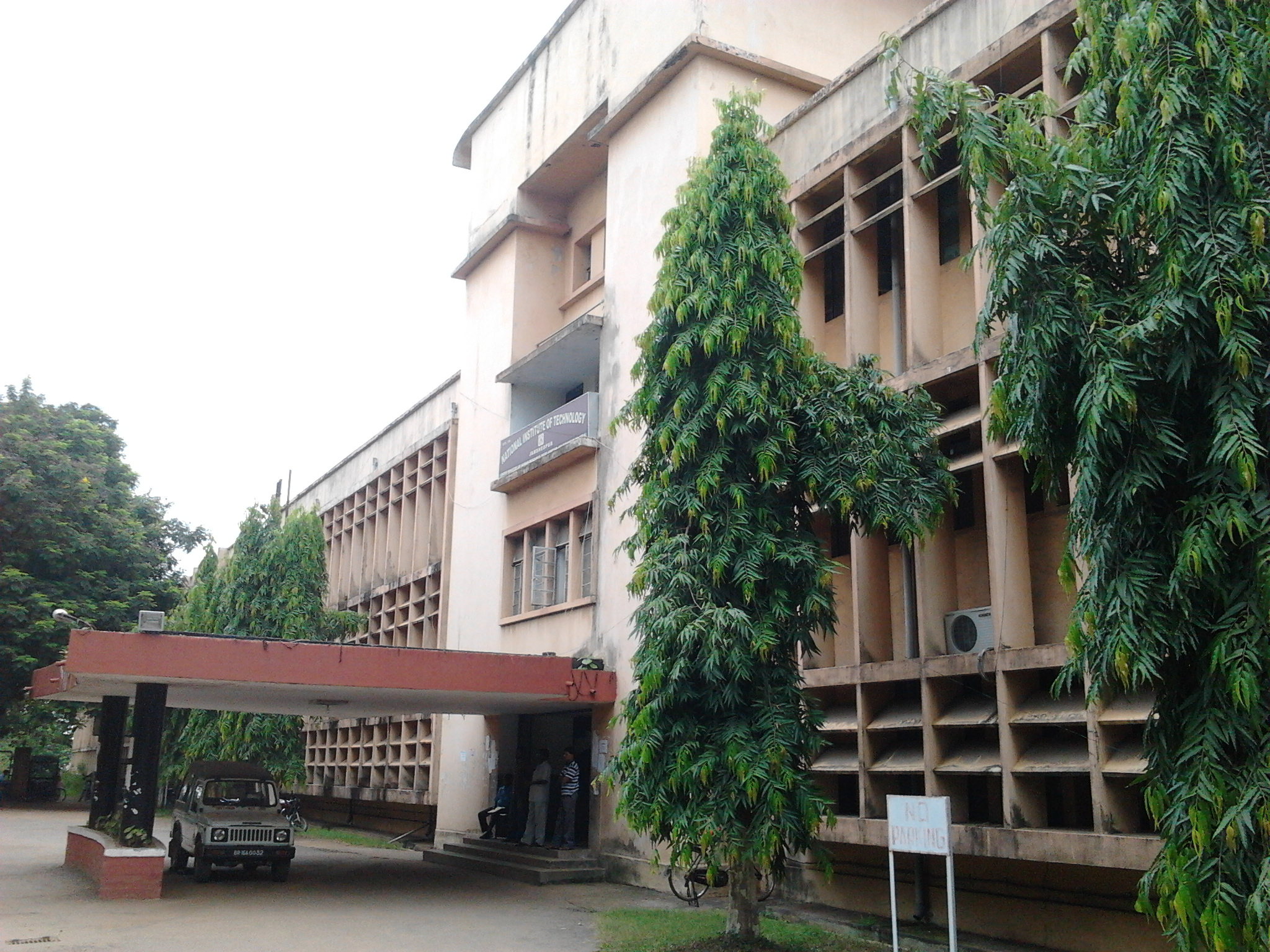
National Institute of Technology, Jamshedpur

Among the educational facilities it had 19 primary schools, 17 middle schools, four secondary schools, two senior secondary schools. The nearest general degree college is at Jamshedpur, four km (2.5 mi) away. It had an engineering college, a polytechnic, a non-formal education centre (Sarva Shiksha Abhiyan).

The National Institute of Technology Jamshedpur, an Institute of National Importance established at Adityapur in 1960, has the status of a Deemed University. Srinath University is a private institution at Dindli, Adityapur with diverse educational programmes. The Indo Danish Tool Room is one of the top polytechnic institutes in India that offers diploma in engineering courses. Government Polytechnic, established at Adityapur in 1980, offers diploma courses in engineering. DAV Public School, NIT Campus, Adityapur is an English-medium coeducational institution established in 1991. It is a higher secondary school affiliated with the CBSE. Central Public School Adityapur is an English-medium coeducational institution established in 2005. It has facilities for teaching from class I to class XII. The school has a playground and a library with 16,000 books and has 60 computers. Srinath Public School Adityapur is an English-medium coeducational institution established in 2014. It is a secondary school affiliated with the CBSE.

Kasturba Gandhi Balika Vidyalaya is a Hindi-medium girls only institution established in 2007. It has facilities for teaching from class VI to class XII. The school has a playground, and a library with 30 books and has 6 computers for teaching and learning purposes. Gayatri Shiksha Neekatan is a Hindi-medium coeducational institution established in 1985. It has facilities for teaching from class I to class XII. The school has a playground, and a library with 250 books and has 14 computers for teaching and learning purposes. Adarsh Shiksha Niketan is a Hindi-medium coeducational institution established in 1992. It has facilities for teaching from class I to class XII. The school has a playground, and a library with 500 books and has 1 computer for teaching and learning purposes. S.N. High School is a Hindi-medium coeducational institution established in 1972. It has facilities for teaching from class I to class X. The school has a playground, and a library with 95 books and has 2 computers for teaching and learning purposes. Victoria Memorial High School is a Hindi-medium coeducational institution established in 1984. It has facilities for teaching from class I to class X. The school has a playground, and a library with 625 books and has 2 computers for teaching and learning purposes. Shri Ram NG High School is a Hindi-medium coeducational institution established in 2009. It has facilities for teaching from class I to class X. The school has a library with 200 books.

== Culture ==
Jamshedpur has its radio station in Adityapur. Among social, cultural and recreational facilities, it had an old age home, a stadium, three cinema theatre, an auditorium/community hall, a public library, and a reading room.
