= Haludbani =

- Census Town
- Location in Jharkhand, India Haludbani (India)
- Coordinates: 22.7528°N 86.2131°E
- Country: India
- State: Jharkhand
- District: Purbi Singhbhum

Area
  - Total: 3.92 km^{2} (1.51 sq mi)

Population (2011)
  - Total: 23,260
  - Density: 5,930/km^{2} (15,400/sq mi)

Languages*
  - Official: Hindi, Urdu
- Time zone: UTC+5:30 (IST)
- PIN: 831002
- Telephone/STD code: 0657
- Vehicle registration: JH 05
- Literacy: 84.68%
- Lok Sabha constituency: Jamshedpur
- Vidhan Sabha constituency: Potka
- Website: jamshedpur.nic.in

Haludbani is a census town in the Golmuri-cum-Jugsalai CD block in the Dhalbhum subdivision of the Purbi Singhbhum district in the Indian state of Jharkhand.

== Geography ==
Jamshedpur Urban Agglomeration
M: municipality, OG: outgrowth, CT: census town, T: tourist centre
Owing to space constraints in the small map, the actual locations in a larger map may vary slightly
For East Singhbhum district location map see Ghatshila or Musabani page

=== Location ===
Haludbani is located at 22.7528°N 86.2131°E.

=== Jamshedpur Urban Agglomeration ===
With its recognition as an industrial town as early as the 1911 census, Jamshedpur was set on the road of steady population growth, as large number of emigrants flocked in for work opportunities. While in the earlier decades the central nucleus grew, in the later decades towns around Jamshedpur grew rapidly. In 2011, Jamshedpur Urban Agglomeration included 13 urban centres, with a total population of 1.3 million people. However, in more recent years, Jamshedpur UA “has lacked the growth and development observed around other similar industrial towns in western and southern India.”

Note: The map alongside presents the Jamshedpur Urban Agglomeration. All places marked in the map are linked in the larger full screen map.

== Demographics ==
Historical population
Year	Pop.	±%
1951	2,750	—
1961	4,239	+54.1%
1971		—
1981	9,520	—
1991	18,830	+97.8%
2001	19,929	+5.8%
2011	25,360	+27.3%
Source: Census of India

According to the 2011 Census, Haludbani town had a total of 5,633 households and a population of 25,360, with 51.1% males and 48.9% females. The Scheduled Caste (SC) population comprised 4% (1012) of the total, while the Scheduled Tribe (ST) population constituted 33% (8377) of the population. Of the total population, 74.7% were literate, while 25.3% were illiterate. Population in the age range 0-6 years was 3,003, leaving this group the literate persons in Haludbani was 18,931 (84.68% of the population over 6 years). The town had 31.9% of its population engaged in some form of work, with 30.1% being main workers and 1.8% marginal workers. There were 68.1% non-workers, with 24.7% being male and 43.3% female.

Haludbani (CT) is a part of Jamshedpur Urban Agglomeration, which includes: Jamshedpur (Industrial Town), Jamshedpur (NAC), Tata Nagar Railway Colony (OG), Mango (NAC), Jugsalai (M), Bagbera (CT), Chhota Gobindpur (CT), Sarjamda (CT), Gadhra (CT), Ghorabandha (CT), Purihasa (CT), Adityapur (M Corp.), Chota Gamahria (CT) and Kapali (CT).

At the 2001 India census, Haludbani had a population of 19,933 (51% male, 49% female). Haludbani had an average literacy rate of 71%, higher than the national average of 59.5%. Male literacy was 78% and female literacy was 62%. 12% of the population were under 6 years of age.

=== Language ===
Languages spoken in Haludbani census town (2011)
1. Bengali (45.9%)
2. Santali (16.8%)
3. Ho (11.7%)
4. Hindi (8.30%)
5. Odia (6.90%)
6. Bhajpuri (4.50%)
7. Mundari (2.00%)
8. Maithili (1.00%)
9. Other (2.90%)

=== Religion ===
Religions in Haludbani town (2011)
Religion	Percent
Hinduism	68.2%
Unclassified Sect.	29.3%
Christianity	1.9%
Islam	0.2%
Sikhism	0.1%
Not stated	0.1%

== Infrastructure ==
According to the District Census Handbook 2011, Purbi Singhbhum, Haludbani covered an area of 3.92 km^{2} (1.51 sq mi). It has an annual rainfall of 1,030.2 mm (40.56 in). Among the civic amenities, it had 12 km (7.5 mi) of roads with open drains, the protected water supply involved hand pump, tube well/ borewell, overhead tank. It had 4,787 domestic electric connections, 10 road lighting points. Among the medical facilities, it had 5 hospitals, 5 dispensaries, 5 health centres, 7 family welfare centres, 12 maternity and child welfare centres, 12 maternity homes, 12 nursing homes, 6 veterinary hospitals, 2 medicine shops. Among the educational facilities it had 3 primary schools, 2 middle schools, the nearest secondary and senior secondary school at Sarjamda, 3 km (1.9 mi) away, the nearest general degree college at Jamshedpur, 15 km (9.3 mi) away. It had 1 non-formal education centre (Sarva Shiksha Abhiyan). It produced sattu. It had the branch offices of 1 nationalised bank, 1 cooperative bank, 1 agricultural credit society.
