= List of neighbourhoods of Jamshedpur =

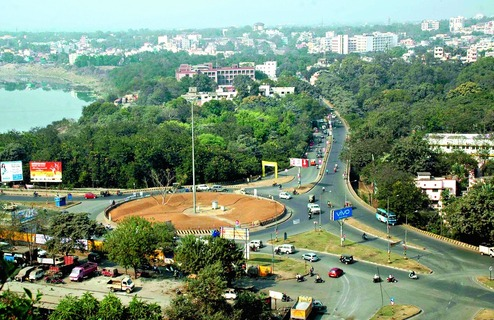
Jamshedpur

The article below provides a list of neighbourhoods in Jamshedpur, India.

== City centre ==
=== Sakchi ===
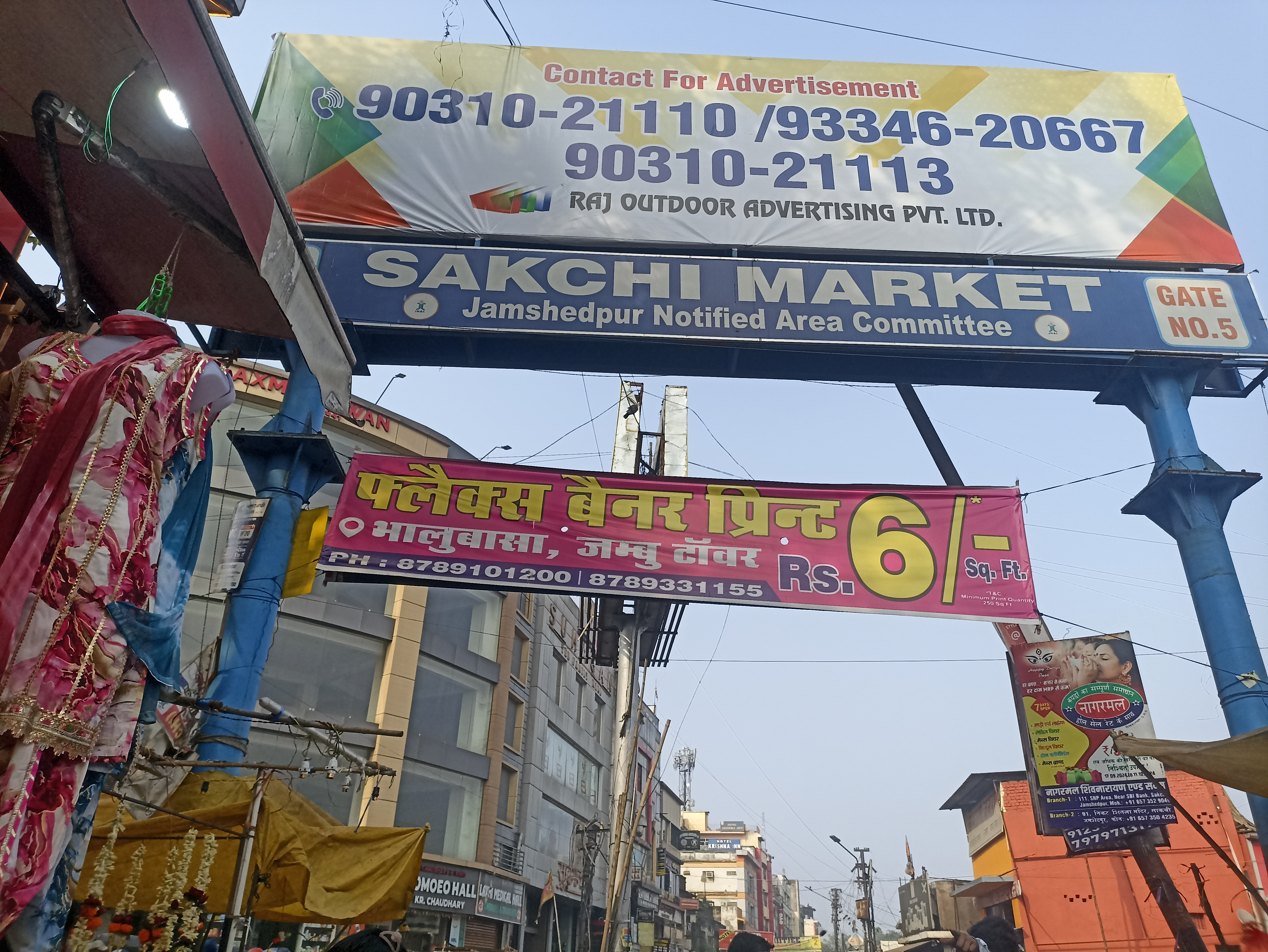
Sakchi

- Sakchi
- Kashidih
- Gurudwara Basti
- Hirasinghbagan
- Mohammedan Line
- Aambagan

=== Bistupur ===
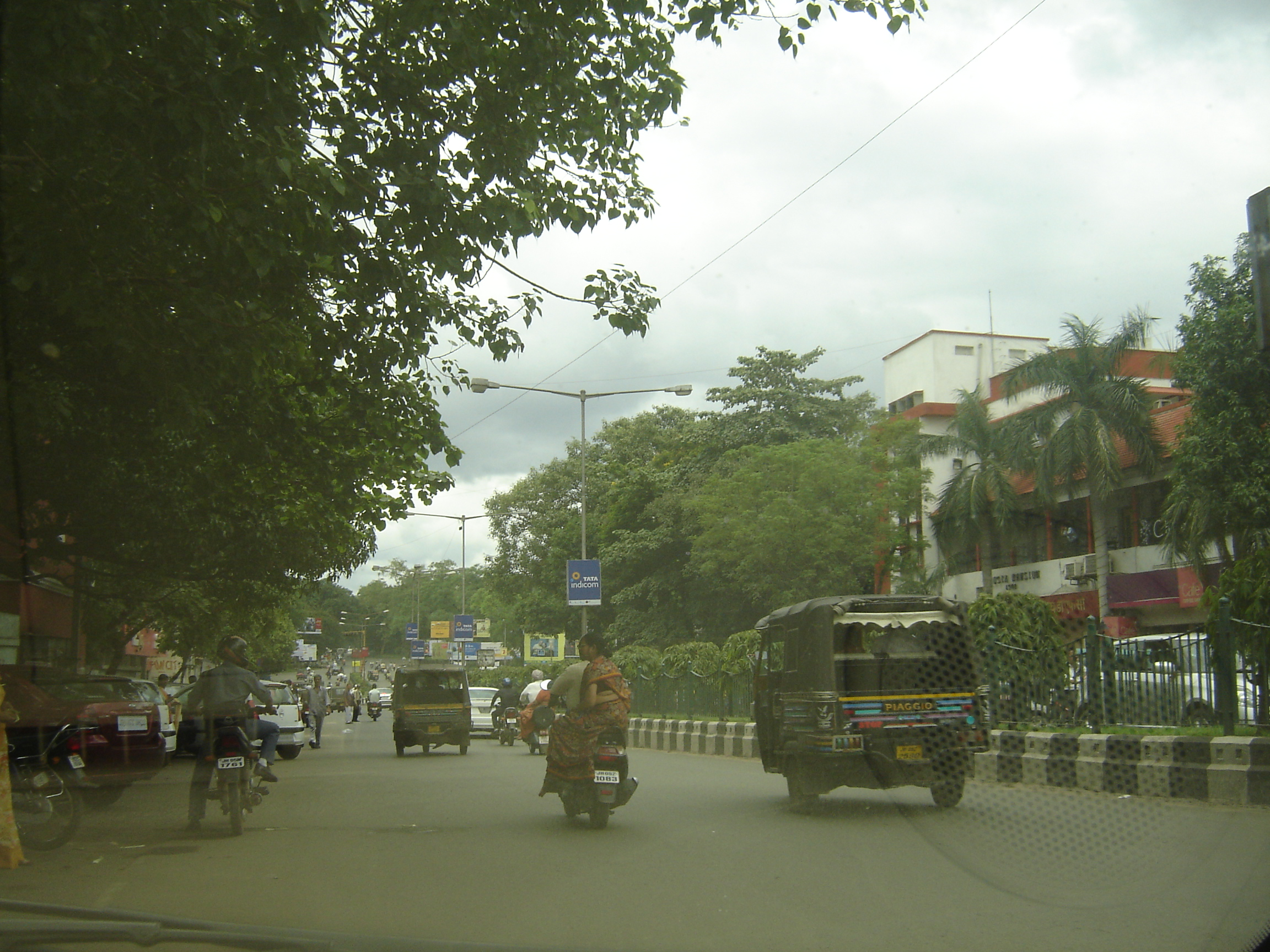
Bistupur

- Rani Kudar
- Ramdas Bhatta
- South Park

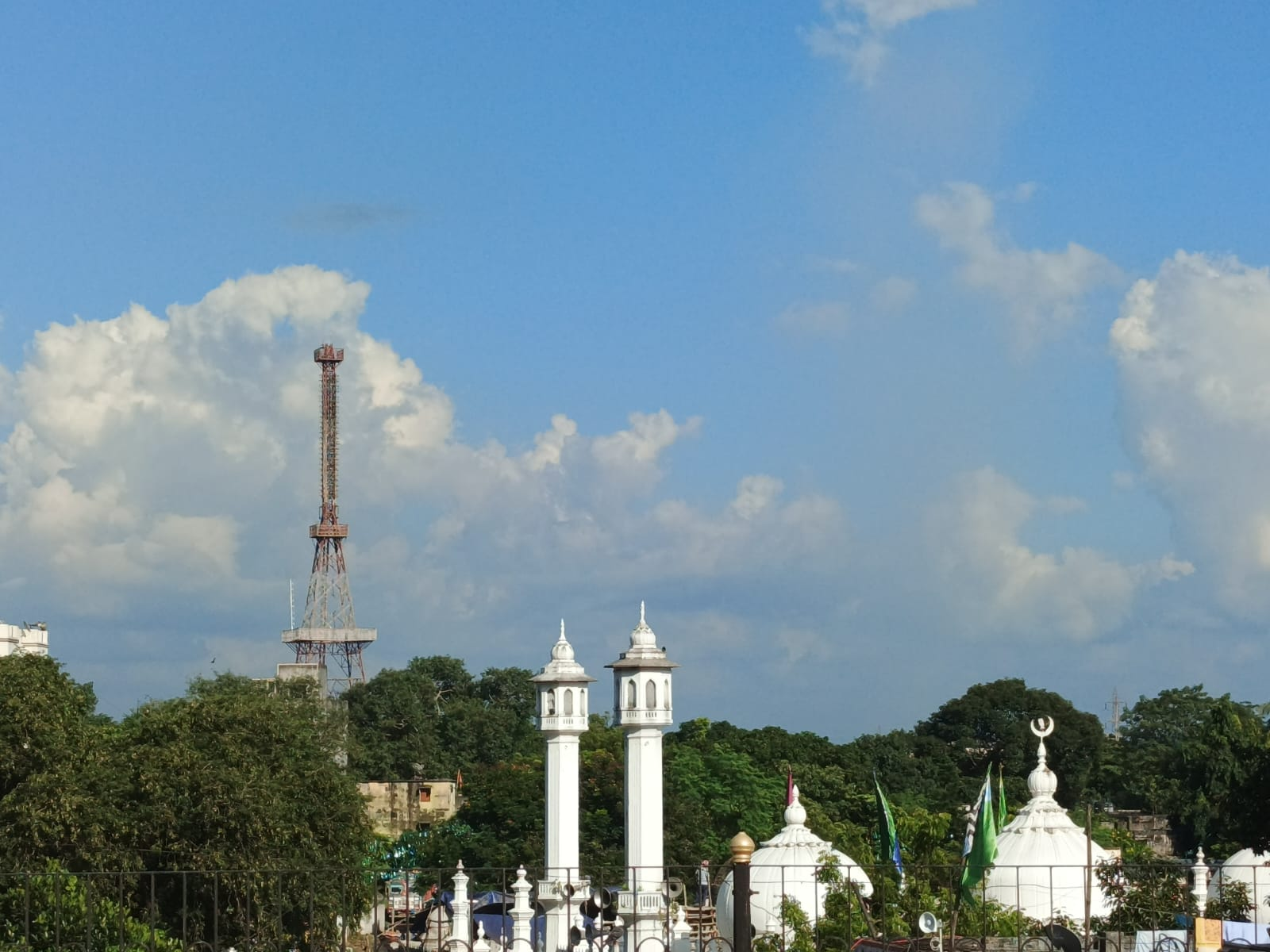
Golmuri

=== Golmuri ===
- Tuiladungri
- Garabasa
- Refugee Colony
- Namda Basti
- Cable Town
- Khawaja Colony
- Tinplate

=== Sidhgora ===
- Sidhgora
- Agrico
- Sitaramdera

=== Northern Town ===
- Circuit House Area
- JRD Tata Sports Complex
- Parsee Colony
- Park Road

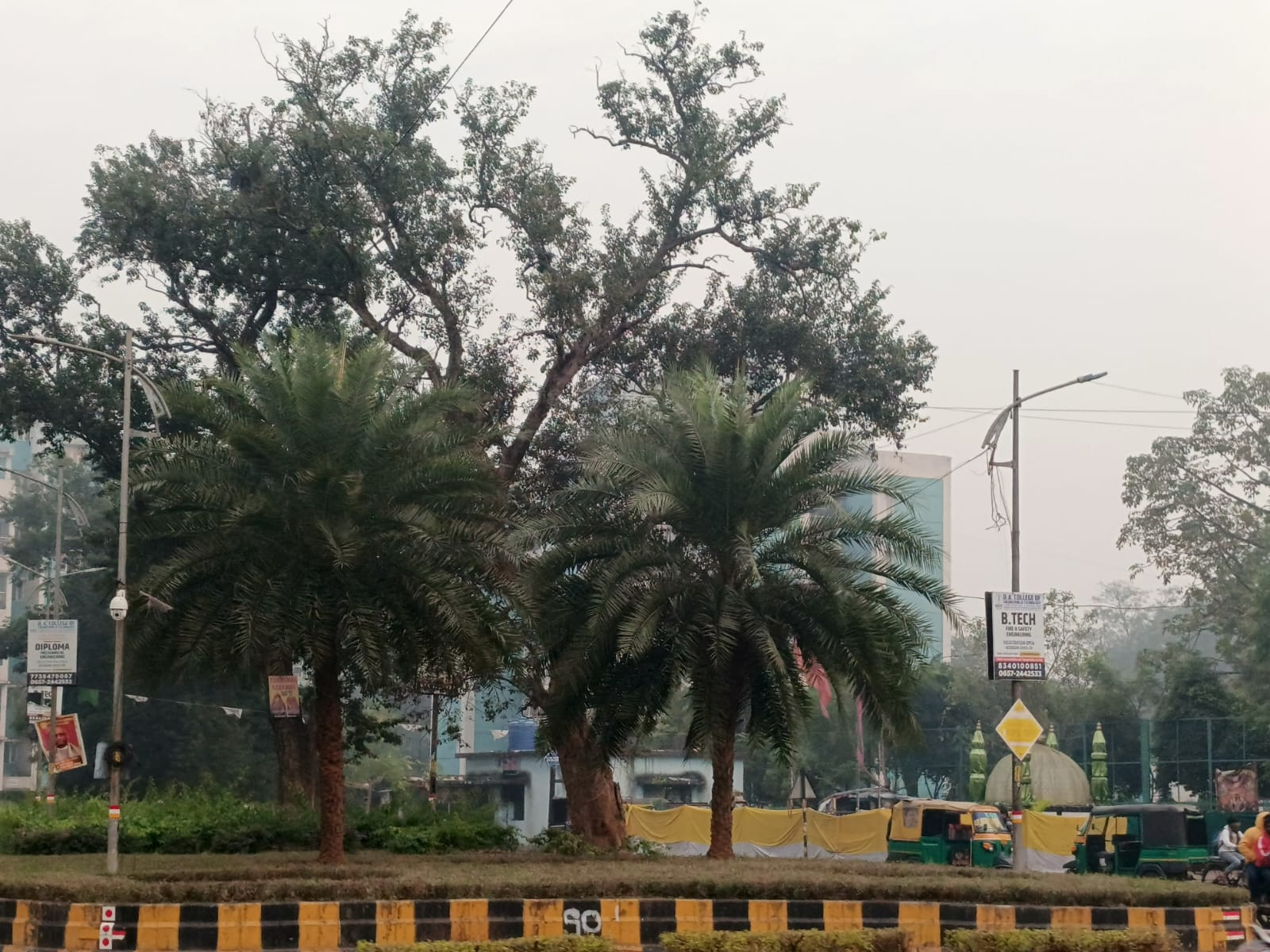
Dhatkidih

=== Dhatkidih ===
- Beldih
- Workers Colony
- A Block
- Masjid Road
- Harijan Basti

== Eastern Jamshedpur ==
Telco

=== Telco Colony ===
- Telco Colony
- Radhikanagar
- Kharangajhar
- Indiranagar
- Jojobera
- Barinagar

=== Birsanagar ===
- Birsanagar
- TRF Colony
- Sadhudera

=== Baridih ===
- Baridih
- Bara
- New Baridih
- Jawahartola

=== Nildih ===
- Gayatrinagar
- Namda Basti
- Gwalabasti
- Manfit
- Kalimali
- Ramadhinbagan

=== Govindpur ===
- Govindpur
- Chhota Govindpur
- Govindpur Colony
- Khankripara
- Samutola
- Khayerbani
- Yashodanagar

=== Moharda ===
- Moharda
- Murakati
- Vijaya Gardens
- Hurlung

=== Ghorabandha ===
- Ghorabandha
- Luabsa
- Manpita
- Prakashnagar

== Northern suburbs ==
=== Bhalubasa ===
- Bhalubasa
- Bhuiyadih
- Nandnagar

=== Pokhari ===
- Pokhari
- Idalbera
- Simaldanga
- Deoghar
- Betakocha
- Turyabera
- Bhelaipahari

=== Mango (lit. Maango) ===
Zakirnagar, Mango

- Chepapul
- Jawaharnagar
- Sabirnagar
- Azadnagar
- Iqra Colony
- Madhavbug
- Bari Colony
- Zakirnagar
- Kedarbagan
- Hayatnagar
- Dimna Road

Kabirnagar

=== Kapali ===
- TOP
- Millatnagar
- Kenddih
- Dangardih
- Kabirnagar

== Western Jamshedpur ==
=== Sonari ===
Sonari

- Adarshnagar
- Khutadih
- Christianpara
- Nirmalnagar
- Ballichela
- Domuhani
- Kaiser Bungalows

=== Kadma ===
- Uliyan
- Shastrinagar
- Dindli Enclave
- BH Area
- TC Colony
- Bhetiya
- ECC

== Western suburbs ==
=== Adityapur ===
- Adityapur
- Naginapuri
- Bantanagar
- Hatiyadih
- NIT More
- Muslim Basti

=== Gamharia ===
- Harisundarpur
- Usha More
- Mohanpur
- TISCO Colony
- Lal Building

=== Kandra ===
- Ratanpur

== Southern Jamshedpur ==
=== Jugsalai ===
- Bagbera
- Makhdumpur
- Kitadih
- Jugsalai Fatak
- Shivnagar
- Khasmahal
- Tatanagar Railway Colony
- Purihasa
- Mahtopara
- Islamnagar

=== Gadhra ===
- Gadhra
- Rahargora
- Barigora

=== Parsudih ===
- Sarjamda
- Sarjamda
- Karandih
- Pramathnagar
- Haludbani
