= Kopali =

Kopali Kapali
- Census Town
- Location in Jharkhand, India Kopali (India)
- Coordinates: 22°50′15″N 86°11′27″E
- Country: India
- State: Jharkhand
- District: Seraikela Kharsawan

Government
  - Type: Federal democracy

Area
  - Total: 6.74 km^{2} (2.60 sq mi)

Population (2011)
  - Total: 43,256
  - Density: 6,420/km^{2} (16,600/sq mi)

Languages*
  - Official: Hindi, Urdu
- Time zone: UTC+5:30 (IST)
- PIN: 832110
- Telephone/ STD code: 06597
- Vehicle registration: JH 22
- Literacy: 72.40%
- Lok Sabha constituency: Ranchi
- Vidhan Sabha constituency: Ichagarh
- Website: seraikela.nic.in

Kopali (also spelled as Kapali) is a census town in the Chandil CD block in the Chandil subdivision of the Seraikela Kharsawan district in the Indian state of Jharkhand.

== Geography ==
Jamshedpur Urban Agglomeration
M: municipality, OG: outgrowth, CT: census town, T: tourist centre
Owing to space constraints in the small map, the actual locations in a larger map may vary slightly
For Seraikela Kharsawan district location map see Saraikela page

=== Jamshedpur Urban Agglomeration ===
With its recognition as an industrial town as early as the 1911 census, Jamshedpur was set on the road of steady population growth, as large number of emigrants flocked in for work opportunities. While in the earlier decades the central nucleus grew, in the later decades towns around Jamshedpur grew rapidly. In 2011, Jamshedpur Urban Agglomeration included 13 urban centres, with a total population of 1.3 million people. However, in more recent years, Jamshedpur UA "has lacked the growth and development observed around other similar industrial towns in western and southern India."

Jamshedpur Urban Agglomeration includes: Jamshedpur (Industrial Town), Jamshedpur (NAC), Tata Nagar Railway Colony (OG), Mango (NAC), Jugsalai (M), Bagbera (CT), Chhota Gobindpur (CT), Haludbani (CT), Sarjamda (CT), Gadhra (CT), Ghorabandha (CT), Purihasa (CT), Adityapur (M Corp.), Chota Gamahria (CT) and Kapali (CT).

Note: The map alongside presents the Jamshedpur Urban Agglomeration. All places marked in the map are linked in the larger full screen map.

== Civic administration ==
There is a police outpost at Kapali.

== Demographics ==
Religion in Kopali (2011)
Religion	Percent
Islam	88.07%
Hinduism	11.26%
Other or not stated	0.67%

According to the 2011 Census of India, Kopali had a total population of 43,256, of which 22,337 (52%) were males and 20,919 (48%) were females. Population in the age range 0–6 years was 7,603. The total number of literate persons in Kopali was 21,815 (72.40% of the population over 6 years). Scheduled Castes and Scheduled Tribes make up 0.69% and 2.83% of the population respectively.

Languages spoken in Kopali (2011)
1. Urdu (52.5%)
2. Hindi (23.5%)
3. Bengali (22.4%)
4. Santali (0.92%)
5. Others (0.59%)

Kapali is a Muslim-majority suburb of Jamshedpur. Kopali is a multilingual city, with Urdu, Hindi and Bengali spoken by large populations.

== Infrastructure ==
According to the District Census Handbook 2011, Seraikela Kharsawan, Kopali covered an area of 6.74 km^{2} (2.60 sq mi). It has an annual rainfall of 1,086.1 mm (42.76 in). Among the civic amenities, it had fifteen km (9.3 mi) of roads with both closed and open drains, the protected water supply involved hand pump, tube well/ borewell, overhead tank. It had 6,351 domestic electric connections, 15 road lighting points. Among the medical facilities, it had 2 hospitals, 4 dispensaries, 4 health centres, 10 family welfare centres, 4 maternity and child welfare centres, 10 maternity homes, 2 nursing homes, 2 charitable hospital/ nursing homes, 10 veterinary hospitals, 5 medicine shops. Among the educational facilities it had 8 primary schools, 7 middle schools, 2 secondary schools, 1 senior secondary school, the nearest general degree college at Jamshedpur, ten km (6.2 mi) away. It had 9 non-formal education centres (Sarva Shiksha Abhiyan). Among social, cultural and recreational facilities, it had 1 orphanage home, 2 auditorium/ community halls. Two important commodities it produced were ready-made clothes, furniture. It had the branch offices of 1 nationalised bank, 4 non-agricultural credit societies.

== Education ==
Merry English School at Kapali is an English-medium coeducational institution established in 2001. It has facilities for teaching from class I to class XII.

[8]
