= Kharkai =

- Union Council
- Country: Pakistan
- Province: Khyber Pakhtunkhwa
- District: Malakand
- Time zone: UTC+5 (PST)

Kharkai is an administrative unit, known as Union council, of Malakand District in the Khyber Pakhtunkhwa province of Pakistan. Its population is near 50000 District Malakand has 2 Tehsils i.e. Swat Ranizai and Sam Ranizai. Each Tehsil comprises certain numbers of Union councils. There are 28 union councils in district Malakand.

== See also ==
- Malakand District
