= Jugsalai =

- Township
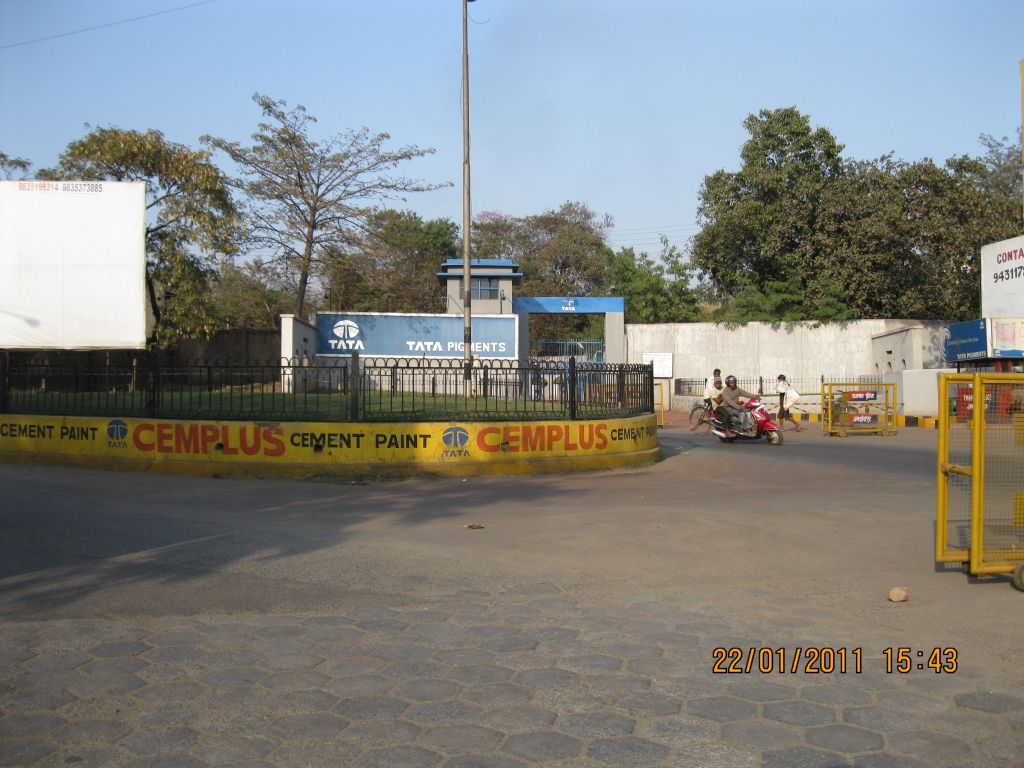
- The Tata Pigments

- Location in Jharkhand, India Jugsalai (India)
- Coordinates: 22°46′10″N 86°10′49″E
- Country: India
- State: Jharkhand
- District: Purbi Singhbhum

Government
  - Type: Municipality

Area
  - Total: 1.25 km^{2} (0.48 sq mi)

Population (2011)
  - Total: 49,660
  - Density: 39,700/km^{2} (103,000/sq mi)
- Time zone: GMT +5:30
- PIN: 831006
- Telephone/STD code: 0657
- Vehicle registration: JH 05
- Literacy: 84.36%
- Lok Sabha constituency: Jamshedpur
- Vidhan Sabha constituency: Jugsalai
- Website: jamshedpur.nic.in

Jugsalai is a township and business center adjacent to Tatanagar Railway Station, Jamshedpur and a municipality in the Dhalbhum subdivision of the Purbi Singhbhum district in the Indian state of Jharkhand. It is often referred as a wholesale market of Jamshedpur.

== Geography ==
Jamshedpur Urban Agglomeration
M: municipality, OG: outgrowth, CT: census town, T: tourist centre
Owing to space constraints in the small map, the actual locations in a larger map may vary slightly
For East Singhbhum district location map see Ghatshila or Musabani page

=== Location ===
Jugsalai is located at 22°46′10″N 86°10′49″E.

Jugsalai has an average elevation of 140 metres (459 feet).

=== Jamshedpur Urban Agglomeration ===
With its recognition as an industrial town as early as the 1911 census, Jamshedpur was set on the road of steady population growth, as large number of emigrants flocked in for work opportunities. While in the earlier decades the central nucleus grew, in the later decades towns around Jamshedpur grew rapidly. In 2011, Jamshedpur Urban Agglomeration included 13 urban centres, with a total population of 1.3 million people. However, in more recent years, Jamshedpur UA “has lacked the growth and development observed around other similar industrial towns in western and southern India.”

Note: The map alongside presents the Jamshedpur Urban Agglomeration. All places marked in the map are linked in the larger full screen map.

== Civic administration ==
The first police station in the area was opened in 1912 at Jugsalai.

== Demographics ==
Historical population
Year	Pop.	±%
1901	0	—
1911	0	0.00%
1921	1	—
1931	8,721	+872000.0%
1941	16,684	+91.3%
1951	——	—
1961	24,528	—
1971	27,364	+11.6%
1981	34,119	+24.7%
1991	38,623	+13.2%
2001	46,114	+19.4%
2011	49,660	+7.7%
Source: Census of India

According to the 2011 Census of India, Jugsalai had a total population of 49,660, of which 26,036 (52%) were males and 23,624 (48%) were females. Population in the age range 0–6 years was 6,115. The total number of literate persons in Jugsalai was 36,773 (84.36% of the population over 6 years).

(*For language details see Golmuri-cum-Jugsalai block#Language and religion)

Jamshedpur Urban Agglomeration includes: Jamshedpur (Industrial Town), Jamshedpur (NAC), Tata Nagar Railway Colony (OG), Mango (NAC), Jugsalai (M), Bagbera (CT), Chhota Gobindpur (CT), Haludbani (CT), Sarjamda (CT), Gadhra (CT), Ghorabandha (CT), Purihasa (CT), Adityapur (M Corp.), Chota Gamahria (CT) and Kapali (CT).

As of 2001 India census, Jugsalai had a population of 46,061. Males constitute 52% of the population and females 48%. Jugsalai has an average literacy rate of 72%, higher than the national average of 59.5%: male literacy is 77%, and female literacy is 67%. In Jugsalai, 13% of the population is under 6 years of age.

Major festivals celebrations in the Jugsalai area include in Chhath Puja Durga Puja, Makar Sankranti, Deepavali, Kali Puja, Holi, Christmas, Easter, Shab-e-baraat, Ramadan, Eid-al-fitr, Eid al-adha, Mawlid, Muharram. Hindu is the Majority Religion in Jugsalai.

== Infrastructure ==
According to the District Census Handbook 2011, Purbi Singhbhum, Jugsalai covered an area of 1.25 km^{2} (0.48 sq mi). It has an annual rainfall of 1,030.2 mm (40.56 in). Among the civic amenities, it had 17.47 km (10.86 mi) of roads with both closed and open drains, the protected water supply involved tap water from treated sources, tube well/ borewell, overhead tank. It had 8,366 domestic electric connections, 386 road lighting points. Among the medical facilities, it had 1 hospital (with 30 beds), 2 dispensaries, 2 health centres, 1 family welfare centre, 6 maternity and child welfare centres,1 maternity home, 1 nursing home, 2 charitable hospitals/ nursing homes, 1 veterinary hospital, 17 medicine shops. Among the educational facilities it had 5 primary schools, 5 middle schools, 4 secondary schools, the nearest senior secondary school at Bishtupur, 3 km (1.9 mi) away, the nearest general degree college at Jamshedpur, 4 km (2.5 mi) away. Among social, cultural and recreational facilities, it had 1 cinema theatre, 2 public library, 2 reading room. It had flour mill, oil mill and produced steel almirahs. It had the branch offices of 5 nationalised banks, 1 cooperative bank, 1 agricultural credit society, 2 non-agricultural credit societies.

== Main areas ==
.* Dispensary Road * Ghoda Chowk * Chowk Bazaar * Gouri Shankar Road * Shahid Thakurji Pathak House * Safih Ganj Mohallah * Goushala Nala Road * Bengali Para * R.P Patel School Road * Gouri Shankar Road * Marwari Para * Panchhi Mohallah * Gwala Para * Chaparia Mohallah * Islamnagar * Chuna Shah Colony * Rahbar Lane * Millatnagar * Habibnagar (Millatnagar) * Hill View Area (Millatnagar) * Warsi Colony (Millatnagar) * Gharib Nawaz Colony * Station Road * Mahato Para Road * Kali Asthan Road * Huma Lane * Ram Tekri Road * Nagar Palika Chowk * M.E. School Road * Safihganj Mohallah * Gadhabasa * Girls School Road * Rahmat Lane * Fish Lane * Ghausia Lane * Harijan Basti * Patnaiya Colony * D.B. Road * Hussaini Lane * Chuna Bhatta * Shiv Ghat Road * Raja Ram Badi * Dhobi Lane * M.E. School Road

== Notable people ==
- Thakur Ji Pathak

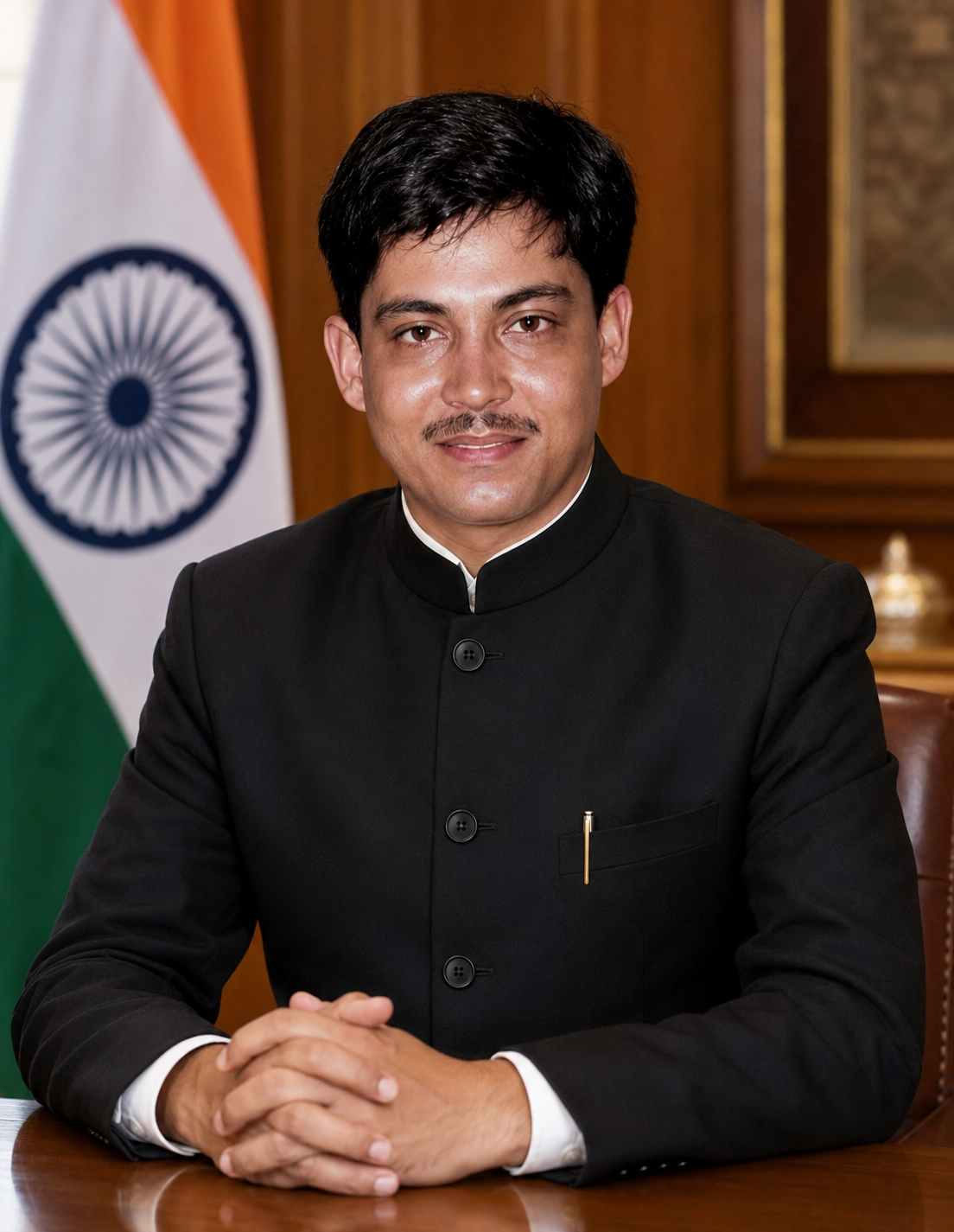
Thakur ji pathak at party office delhi

Indian Activist, National Politician From Jamshedpur Jharkhand (bihar).

- Ram Chandra Sahis Politician, Ex-MLA Jugsalai Vidhansabha Constituency.
- Mangal Kalindi Politician, Jugsalai Vidhansabha Constituency.
