= Bagbera Colony =

- Census Town
- Location in Jharkhand, India Bagbera Colony (India)
- Coordinates: 22.768°N 86.191°E
- Country: India
- State: Jharkhand
- District: Purbi Singhbhum

Population (2011)
  - Total: 78,356

Languages*
  - Official: Hindi, Urdu
- Time zone: UTC+5:30 (IST)
- PIN: 831002
- Telephone/STD code: 0657
- Vehicle registration: JH 05
- Literacy: 82.04%
- Lok Sabha constituency: Jamshedpur
- Vidhan Sabha constituency: Potka
- Website: jamshedpur.nic.in

Bagbera Colony (also referred to as Bagbera) is a census town in the Golmuri-cum-Jugsalai CD block in the Dhalbhum subdivision of the Purbi Singhbhum district in the state of Jharkhand, India.

== Geography ==
Jamshedpur Urban Agglomeration
M: municipality, OG: outgrowth, CT: census town, T: tourist centre
Owing to space constraints in the small map, the actual locations in a larger map may vary slightly
For East Singhbhum district location map see Ghatshila or Musabani page

=== Location ===
Bagbera Colony is located at 22.768°N 86.191°E.

=== Jamshedpur Urban Agglomeration ===
With its recognition as an industrial town as early as the 1911 census, Jamshedpur was set on the road of steady population growth, as large number of emigrants flocked in for work opportunities. While in the earlier decades the central nucleus grew, in the later decades towns around Jamshedpur grew rapidly. In 2011, Jamshedpur Urban Agglomeration included 13 urban centres, with a total population of 1.3 million people. However, in more recent years, Jamshedpur UA “has lacked the growth and development observed around other similar industrial towns in western and southern India.”

Note: The map alongside presents the Jamshedpur Urban Agglomeration. All places marked in the map are linked in the larger full screen map.

== Civic administration ==
There is a police station at Bagbera.

== Demographics ==
According to the 2011 Census of India, Bagbera had a total population of 78,356, of which 40,626 (52%) were males and 37,730 (48%) were females. Population in the age range 0–6 years was 10,039. The total number of literate persons in Bagbera was 56,047 (82.04% of the population over 6 years).

(*For language details see Golmuri-cum-Jugsalai block#Language and religion)

Jamshedpur Urban Agglomeration includes: Jamshedpur (Industrial Town), Jamshedpur (NAC), Tata Nagar Railway Colony (OG), Mango (NAC), Jugsalai (M), Bagbera (CT), Chhota Gobindpur (CT), Haludbani (CT), Sarjamda (CT), Gadhra (CT), Ghorabandha (CT), Purihasa (CT), Adityapur (M Corp.), Chota Gamahria (CT) and Kapali (CT).

As of 2001 India census, Bagbera had a population of 67,100. Males constitute 52% of the population and females 48%. Bagbera has an average literacy rate of 66%, higher than the national average of 59.5%; with 59% of the males and 41% of females literate. 14% of the population is under 6 years of age.

== Infrastructure ==
According to the District Census Handbook 2011, Purbi Singhbhum, Bagbera covered an area of 2.24 km^{2} (0.86 sq mi). It has an annual rainfall of 1,030.2 mm (40.56 in). Among the civic amenities, it had 22 km (14 mi) of roads with both closed and open drains, the protected water supply involved hand pump, tube well/ borewell, overhead tank. It had 14,426 domestic electric connections, 100 road lighting points. Among the medical facilities, it had 1 hospital (with 40 beds), 2 dispensaries, 2 health centres, 1 family welfare centre, 4 maternity and child welfare centres, 4 maternity homes, 1 nursing home, 4 veterinary hospitals. Among the educational facilities it had 43 primary schools, 17 middle schools, 11 secondary schools, 1 senior secondary school, the nearest general degree college at Bistupur, 8 km (5.0 mi) away. Three important products it produced were bucket, iron product, flour mill product. It had the branch offices of 1 nationalised bank, 2 cooperative banks, 1 agricultural credit society.
