= Ghatshila =

Ghatshila Ghātshilā (Hindi)
- Town
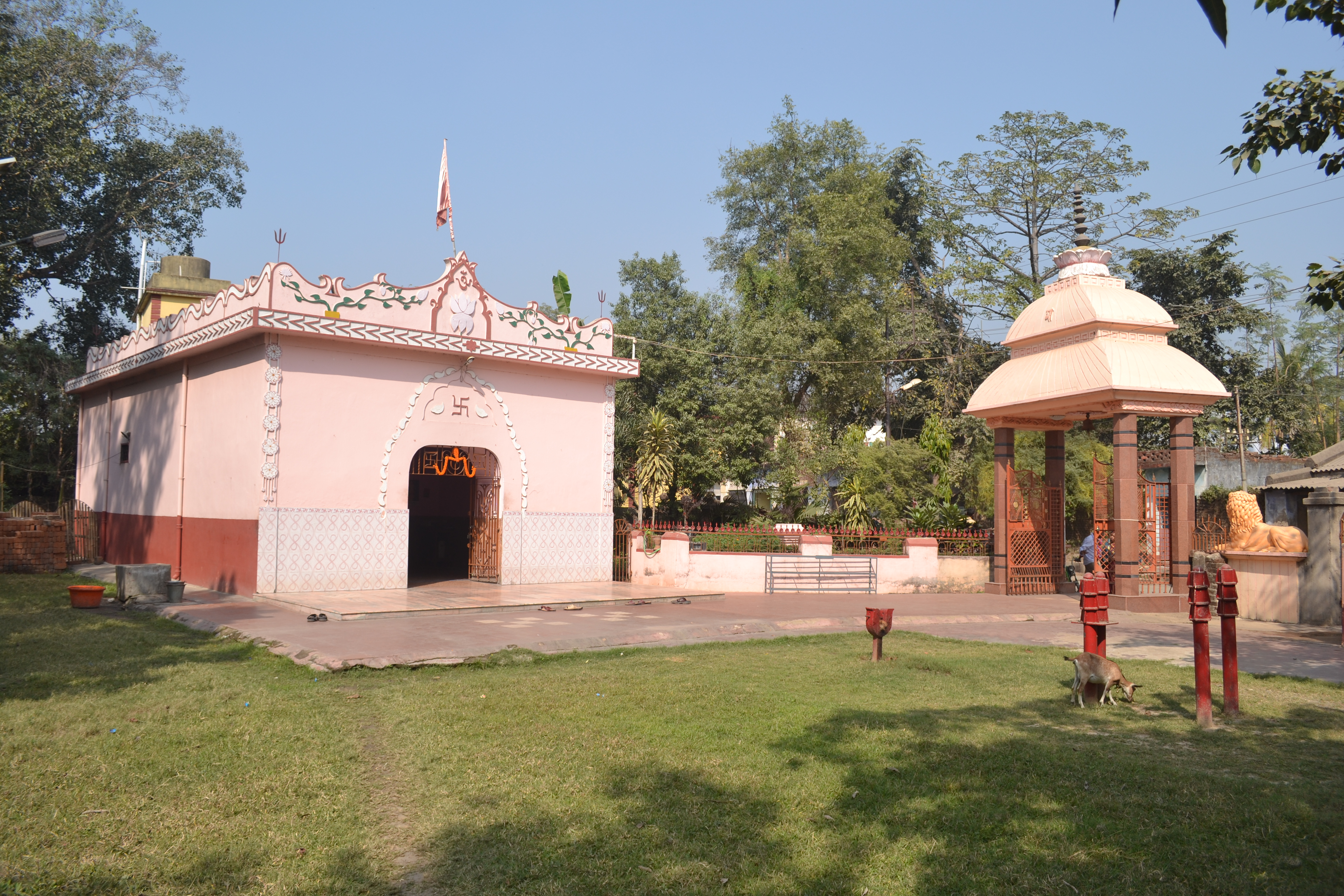
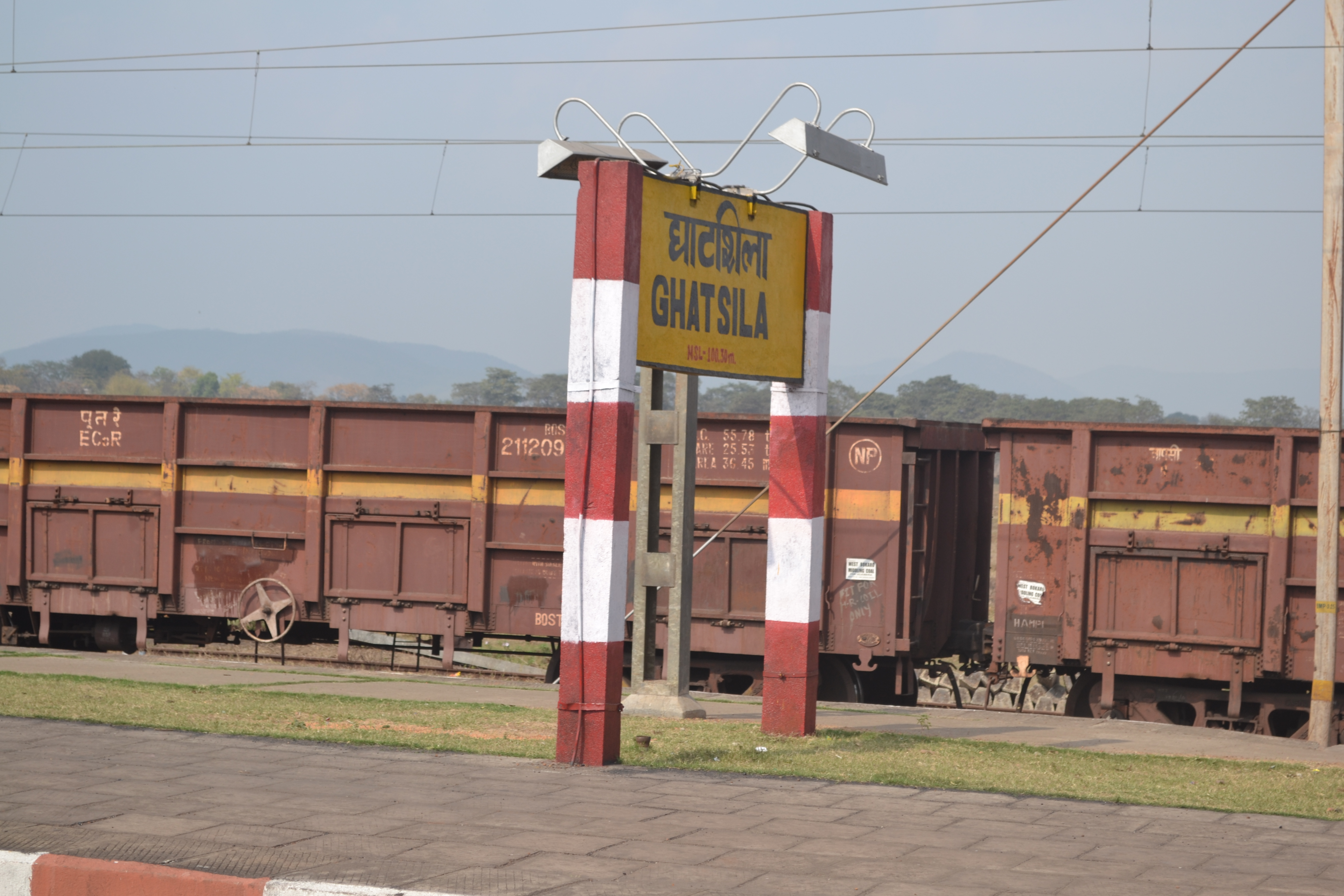
- Rankini Temple, Ghatshila (left), Ghatshila railway station (right)
- Nickname: Copper City
- Location in Jharkhand, India Ghatshila (India)
- Coordinates: 22.5801°N 86.4543°E
- Country: India
- State: Jharkhand
- District: East Singhbhum
- Elevation: 103 m (338 ft)

Population (2011)
  - Total: 40,624
  - Rank: Class III

Demographics
  - Literacy rate: 85.03%
  - Official language: Hindi
  - Most spoken language: Bengali
- Time zone: UTC+5:30 (IST)
- PIN: 832303
- Telephone/STD code: 0657
- Vehicle registration: JH 05
- Literacy: 85.03%
- Lok Sabha constituency: Jamshedpur
- Vidhan Sabha constituency: Ghatsila
- Website: jamshedpur.nic.in

Ghatshila is a small town in the Ghatshila CD block in the Ghatshila subdivision of the East Singhbhum district, in the Indian state of Jharkhand.

== History ==
According to legends, the Dhalbhum royal family is descended from the ancient Kalachuris of Dahala, from whom the surname Dhal, also traditionally known as Dhabal, is believed to have originated. The legends further state that the Dhal warriors defeated Chintamani Dhoba, a local ruler, and conquered his territory, which was subsequently named Dhalbhum after the Dhal lineage.These families kept up a sort of semi-royal state and dignified their heir-apparent and those in immediate succession with title of honour, which denotes precedence. Thus, in the Dhal dynasty of Dhalbhum, the oldest son of the ruling king (Rajah) took the title of Jubraj (Yuvraj), the second that of Hikkim, the third of Bara Thakur, the fourth that of Kuar, the fifth that of Musib and the rest Babu.

The area of the kingdom of Dhalbhum was approximately 1,200-square-mile (3,100 km^{2}). Raja Jaganath constructed the Rankini Mandir at Galudih. But due to some problem, he shifted the Kali temple along with all the associates and other people to Ghatsila and built up a temple of goddess Kali, beside Ghatshila police station which is known as Rankini Mata.

Ghatshila was the administrative capital of Dhalbhum. Ghatshila has several palaces, schools and administrative buildings constructed by the rulers of Dhalbhum zamindari.

=== Rebellions ===
==== Ghatshila Raj ====
After several attempts in 1765, the British invaded the Dhalbhum and Ghatshila areas in 1767. The Raja of Ghatshila resisted along with his countrymen, but was later arrested and his nephew Jagannath Dhal was appointed as the new ruler. In 1767, Jagannath Singh Patar, a zamindar of Dampara (Ghatshila) in Dhalbhum, revolted against the enhanced revenue taxes of the British East India Company. This revolt is well known as Chuar rebellion, the first revolt against British East India Company in Bengal Presidency.

Inspired by the Dampara zamindar Jagannath Patar, the Raja declared himself as an independent ruler of Dhalbhum and refused to pay taxes to the British. Captain Morgan was sent to Ghatshila, Raja Jagannath was removed from his throne and made Baikunth Dhal (Nemu Dhal) the king. Unhappy with the decision, Raja Jagannath Dhal revolted. In which the Rajah of Jhargram and Dampara sardar Jagannath Patar, assisted him. The English Company sent Lieutenant Rook and Charles Magan to suppress the rebellion. In 1777, the British re-proclaimed Jagannath Dhal as the king, after which the rebellion was quelled.

== Geography ==
Cities, towns and locations in East Singhbhum district in Kolhan Division (Locations around Jamshedpur are shown in the Jamshedpur Urban Agglomeration map - see Bagbera Colony page)
M: municipality, R: rural/ urban centre, CT: census town, T: tourist centre
Owing to space constraints in the small map, the actual locations in a larger map may vary slightly

=== Location ===
Ghatshila is located at 22.60°N 86.48°E. It has an average elevation of 103 m (338 ft).

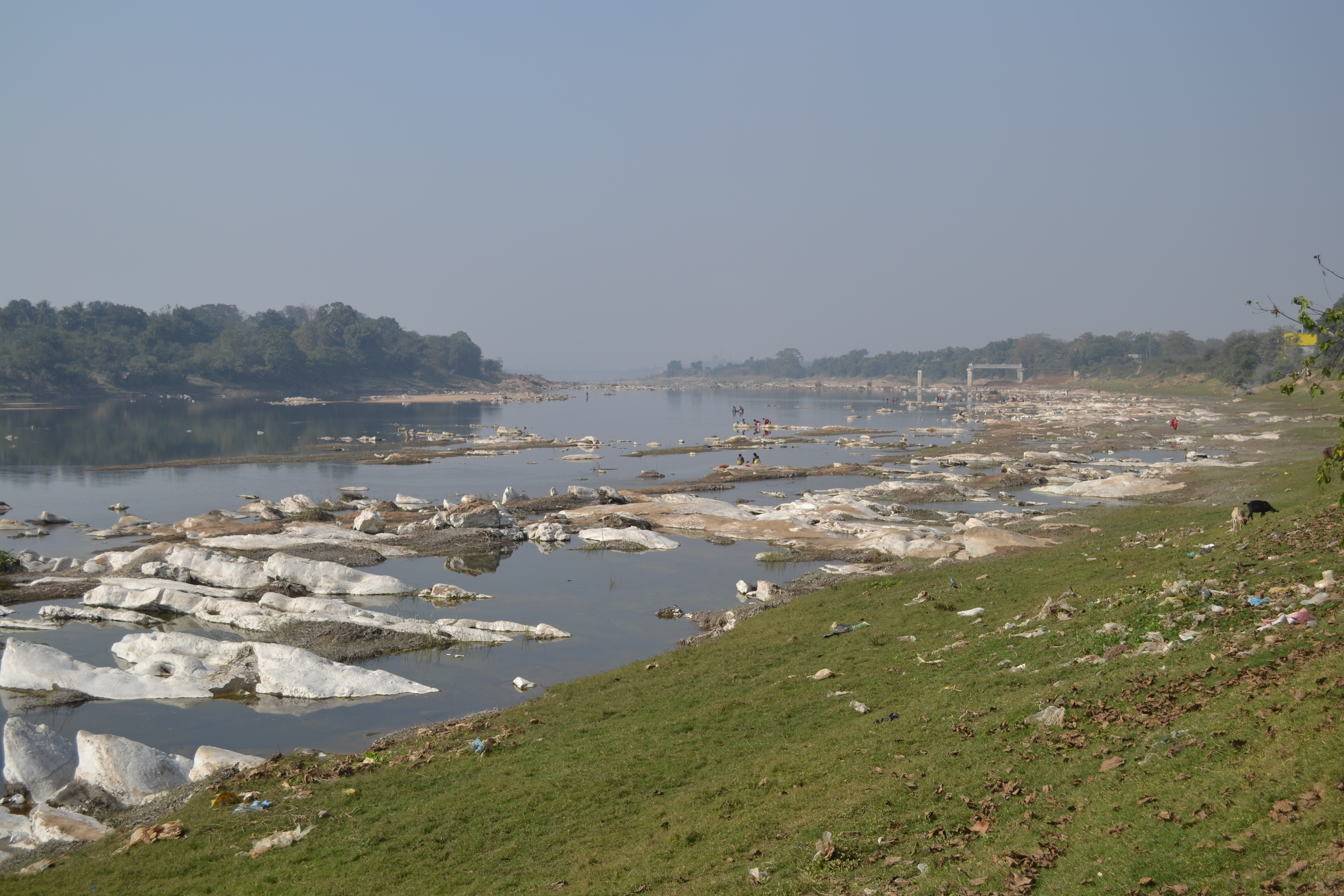
Subarnarekha river at Ghatshila

It is 45 km from Jamshedpur. The town is located on the bank of the Subarnarekha River, and it is situated in a forested area. It contains a railway station on the main line of the South Eastern Railway. Ghatsila was formerly the headquarters of the kingdom of Dhalbhum.

Ghatsila has its diversity with dams, falls, rivers, forest, mountains and valley. The scenes are breathtaking especially at sunset. It has a township as well as a village touch. There are areas where people do farming for a living.

There is a community development block named Ghatshila block, which has its headquarters at Ghatshila. This block was established on 4 May 1962.

=== Area overview ===
The area shown in the map “forms a part of the Chota Nagpur Plateau and is a hilly upland tract”. The main rivers draining the district are the Subarnarekha and the Kharkai. The area lying between Jamshedpur and Ghatshila is the main industrial mining zone. The rest of the district is primarily agricultural. In the district, as of 2011, 56.9% of the population lives in the rural areas and a high 43.1% lives in the urban areas.

Note: The map alongside presents some of the notable locations in the district. All places marked in the map are linked in the larger full screen map.

== Civic administration ==
There is a police station at Ghatshila.

== Demographics ==
Historical population
Year	Pop.	±%
1951	4,211	—
1961	14,330	+240.3%
1971	18,351	+28.1%
1981	25,175	+37.2%
1991	32,417	+28.8%
2001	37,854	+16.8%
2011	40,624	+7.3%
Source: Census of India

At initial baseline Ghatshila had a population of 4,211 people and At final baseline Ghatshila has a population of 40,624 people. This indicates a 864.7% population growth from 1951 to 2011.

According to the 2011 Census of India, Ghatshila had a total population of 40,624, of which 20,912 (51%) were males and 17,912 (49%) were females. Population in the age range 0–6 years was 4,292. The total number of literate persons in Ghatshila was 30,892 (85.03% of the population over 6 years).

(*For language details see Ghatshila block#Language and religion)

As of 2001 India census, Ghatshila had a population of 37,850. Males constitute 53% of the population and females 47%. Ghatshila has an average literacy rate of 73%, higher than the national average of 59.5%: male literacy is 79%, and female literacy is 65%. In Ghatshila, 11% of the population is under 6 years of age.

=== Religion ===
Religion in Ghatshila (2011).
1. Hinduism (76.7%)
2. Islam (11.6%)
3. Sikhism (2.28%)
4. Christianity (1.62%)
5. Other religions/Not stated (7.87%)

Hinduism is the dominant religion in Ghatshila, followed by 76.66% of the population. Islam is a significant minority, followed by 11.56% of the population. Other religions with a significant number of adherents include Sikhism (2.28%) and Christianity (1.62%).

=== Languages ===
Languages spoken in Ghatshila town (2011)
1. Bengali (50.6%)
2. Hindi (22.7%)
3. Urdu (7.59%)
4. Santali (6.40%)
5. Odia (5.24%)
6. Others (7.45%)

According to 2011 census, Bengali was the most spoken language in Ghatshila town with 20,572 speakers followed by Hindi at 9,215, Urdu at 3,085, Santali at 2,602 and Odia at 2,130.

== Infrastructure ==
According to the District Census Handbook 2011, Purbi Singhbhum, Ghatshila covered an area of 15.97 km^{2} (6.17 sq mi). It has an annual rainfall of 1,030.2 mm (40.56 in). Among the civic amenities, it had 24 km (15 mi) of roads with both closed and open drains, the protected water supply involved hand pump, tap water from treated sources, overhead tank. It had 8,153 domestic electric connections, 116 road lighting points. Among the medical facilities, it had 1 hospital (with 70 beds), 20 dispensaries, 20 health centres, 1 family welfare centre, 1 maternity and child welfare centre, 2 nursing homes, 1 veterinary hospital, 25 medicine shops. Among the educational facilities it had 16 primary schools, 5 middle schools, 4 secondary schools, 3 senior secondary schools, the nearest general degree college at Jamshedpur, 12 km (7.5 mi) away. It had 1 non-formal education centre (Sarva Shiksha Abhiyan), Among social, cultural and recreational facilities, it had 1 stadium, 1 cinema theatre, 1 auditorium/ community hall, 2 public libraries, 2 reading rooms. An important commodity it produced was copper. It had the branch offices of 3 nationalised banks, 1 private commercial bank, 1 cooperative bank, 1 agricultural credit society.

=== Economy ===
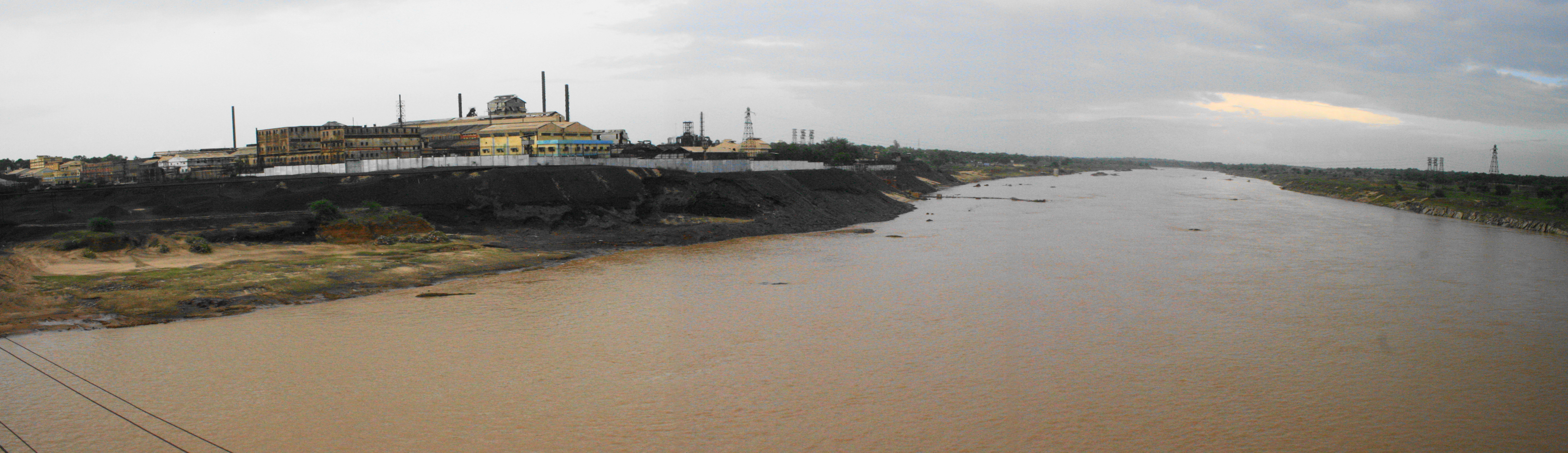
HCL copper smelter

Hindustan Copper Limited is located at Moubhandar, a mile away. This is the chief employer or indirect source of income for the people of Ghatshila, Moubhandar, Musabani and nearby villages. Ghatshila is best known for these mines because they are Asia's first copper mines and the world's second deepest mines.

=== Transport ===
Ghatshila is connected to most of the important stations in Bihar and Jharkhand through rail and road network. Jamshedpur is at a distance of 45 km (by road) and 37 km (by railroad) west of this town. Most of the trains running from Kharagpur that goes to west towards Jamshedpur, have a stoppage here. Distance between Ghatsila and Kharagpur is about 98 km.

Railway

The Ghatsila railway station is situated on the Kharagpur-Tatanagar section of Howrah–Mumbai track, 215 km from Howrah. Notable trains which stop here are Ispat Express (train no. 12781/12782), Kurla–Howrah Express (train no. 18030/18029), Steel Express (train no. 12813/12814). It is well connected to 3 metros in India namely Mumbai (by Bombay Express), Kolkata (many trains starting from 6 o'clock in the morning by Steel Express to midnight at 1.15 by Samleshwari Exp) and New Delhi (by Neelachal Express, Purushottam Express and Utkal Express). There are many local Passenger trains connecting Jamshedpur and Kharagpur with Ghatshila.

Road

It is about 240 km from Kolkata. Those travelling from Kolkata first have to take NH 6 to Baharagora and then take the road to Jamshedpur. Buses plying between Kharagpur and Jamshedpur pass through Ghatshila. Buses plying from Bhubaneswar or Kolkata to Jamshedpur or Ranchi also pass through Ghatshila. By road Jamshedpur is 45 km away. There are many buses connecting Ghatsila to Jamshedpur daily, from morning 6 o'clock to evening 5 o'clock. There are two routes connecting Jamshedpur to Ghatsila, one route through NH33 and another route through Jadugoda.

=== Education ===
There are large number of schools and colleges which help a large number of youths to get their primary education in the town itself which has also helped in increasing the literacy rate of Ghatshila to 85.03%. Some of the prominent schools and colleges are listed below.

Schools

- Kendriya Vidyalaya Surda, Ghatshila
- Irvine Adventist School, Gopalpur
- Sant Nandalal Smriti Vidya Mandir
- St. Joseph's Convent School at Tumandungri, Musaboni
- Shivlal +2 High School, Musaboni
- St. Joseph's Convent School (Kashida)
- Gyandeep Public School
- J.C School at College Road
- Saraswati Shishu Vidyamandir
- Sri Sri Vidyamandir at Kasidah
- Marwadi Hindi High School
- St. Paul High School
- The Oxford Convent at Dahigora
- Loreto Convent Public School
- Holy Heart School

Colleges

- Ghatsila College
- Ghatsila Women's College at Kasidah

== Media ==
Radio Station: 100.1 MHz (Akashvani Ghatshila)

== Festivals ==
Ghatsila has a very diverse culture since people from number of communities live here. Many festivals are celebrated here

- Sagun Sohrai
- Durga Puja
- Ganesh Puja
- Baha Bonga
- Makar Porob
- Dipawali (Diwali)
- Sohrai
- Mage Porob
- Saraswati Puja
- Laxmi Puja

== Tourism ==
Some of the places of interest are:

- Subarnarekha River, Moubhandar, Ghatshila - riverfront
- Chota Pul at Swarnarekha River
- Fuldungri Pahar at Phuldungri, Ghatshila
- Gouri Kunja, House of Bengali Writer Bibhuti Bhushan Bandhopadhayay
- Ramkrishna Math, Dahigora, Ghatshila
- Brahmarshi Jagadananda sanyas ashram, Dahigora, Ghatshila
- Ghatsila Rajbari, Rajstate
- Shivdas Ghosh Children's Park, Tamukpal
- Rankini Mandir, Ghatshila
- Ghatsila City Centre, college road, Ghatsila
- Burudi Dam
- Dharagiri Fall
- Amadubi-Panijiya Rural Tourism Centre, Panijiya, Jharkhand 832302
- Rankini Mandir, Jadugoda, Rohinibera
- Galudih Barrage, Ulda, Jharkhand 832304
- Birsa Fun City Waterpark, Karanja, Jharkhand 832304

== Gallery ==
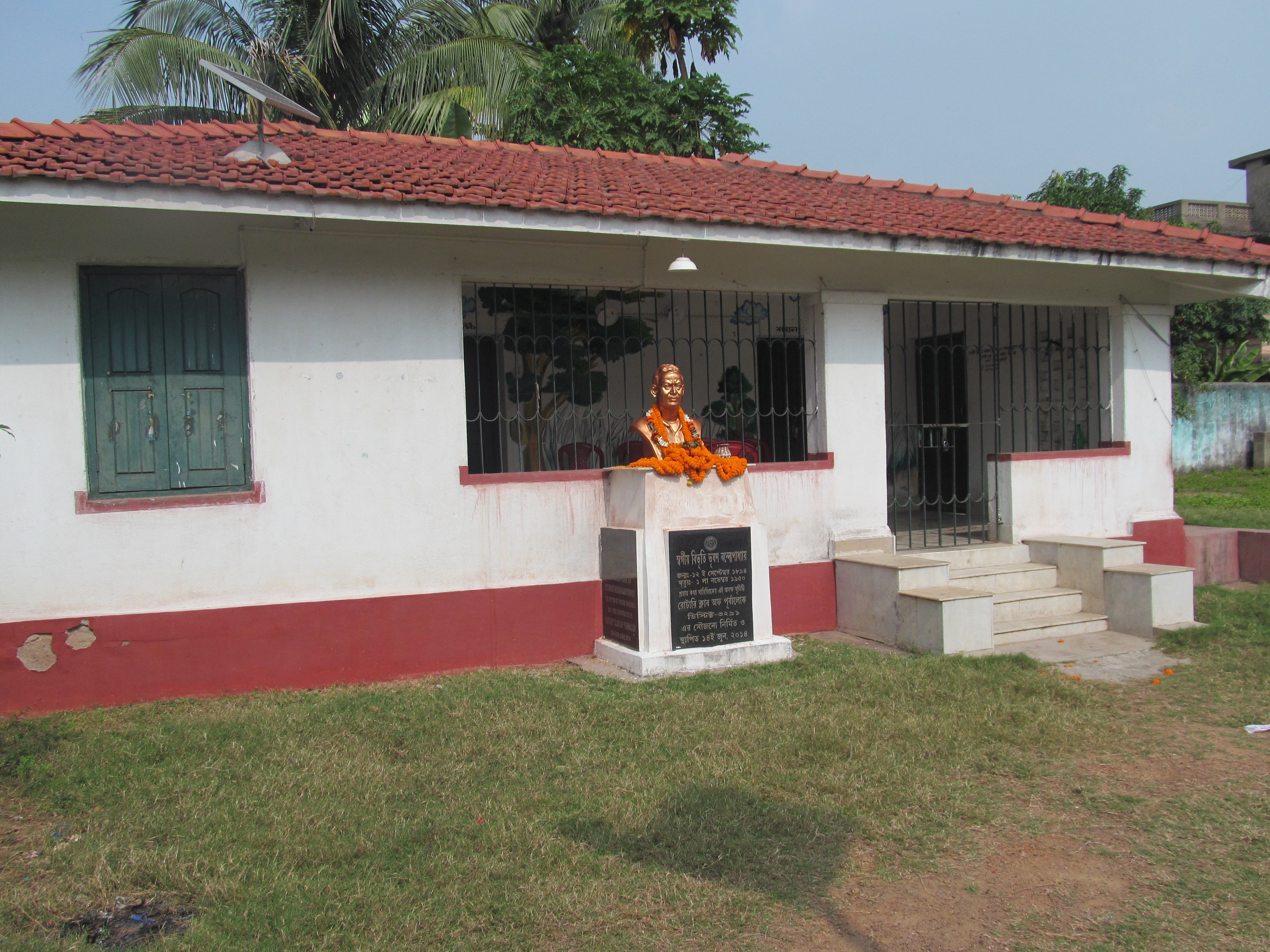
Gouri Kunja, the house of Bibhutibhuasan Bandyopadhyay

Moubhandar Bridge on Subarnarekh river

Ratmohana Waterfall

Old Moubhandar Bridge

Dharagiri Waterfalls

Hindustan Copper Limited factory at Moubhandar, Ghatshila
