= Railway stations in Jharkhand =

Railway stations in Jharkhand are under jurisdiction of four railway zones; the Eastern Railway zone, East Central Railway zone & South Eastern Railway Zone, and 8 divisions.

== List ==
These are the railway stations in the state of Jharkhand in India.

Station Name	Station Code	District	Railway Zone	Elevation
Adityapur railway station	ADTP	Seraikela Kharsawan district	South Eastern Railway zone	108 metres (354 ft)
Akashi railway station	AKZ	Lohardaga district	South Eastern Railway zone	682 metres (2,238 ft)
Amlo railway station	AMLO	Bokaro district	South Eastern Railway zone	200 metres (660 ft)
Angarpathra Halt railway station	ANJE	Dhanbad district	South Eastern Railway zone	200 metres (660 ft)
Argora railway station	AOR	Ranchi district	South Eastern Railway zone	641 metres (2,103 ft)
Arigada railway station	ARGD	Ramgarh district	South Eastern Railway zone	337 metres (1,106 ft)
Asanboni railway station	ASB	East Singhbhum district	South Eastern Railway zone	200 metres (660 ft)
Baidyanathdham railway station	BDME	Deoghar district	Eastern Railway zone	200 metres (660 ft)
Bakudi railway station	BKLE	Sahebganj district	South Eastern Railway zone	200 metres (660 ft)
Bano railway station	BANO	Simdega district	South Eastern Railway zone	300 metres (980 ft)
Bara Jamda railway station	BJMD	West Singhbhum district	South Eastern Railway zone	445 metres (1,460 ft)
Barabambo railway station	BRM	West Singhbhum district	South Eastern Railway zone	200 metres (660 ft)
Barharwa Junction railway station	BHW	Sahebganj district	South Eastern Railway zone	300 metres (980 ft)
Barkakana railway station	BRKA	Ramgarh district	East Central Railway zone	341 metres (1,119 ft)
Barmasia railway station	BRMA	Dumka district	Eastern Railway zone	207 metres (679 ft)
Bansjora railway station	BSZ	Dhanbad district	South Eastern Railway zone	200 metres (660 ft)
Barkipona railway station	BRKP	Ramgarh district	South Eastern Railway zone	355 metres (1,165 ft)
Barwadih Junction railway station	BRWD	Latehar district	South Eastern Railway zone	296 metres (971 ft)
Baseria railway station	BDB	Dhanbad district	South Eastern Railway zone	200 metres (660 ft)
Basukinath railway station	BSKH	Dumka district	Eastern Railway zone	207 metres (679 ft)
Bendi railway station	BFQ	Latehar district	East Central Railway zone	367 metres (1,204 ft)
Bermo railway station	BRMO	Bokaro district	East Central Railway zone	210 metres (690 ft)
Bhalulata railway station	BUL	Sundargarh district	South Eastern Railway zone	200 metres (660 ft)
Bhaga Junction railway station	VAA	Dhanbad district	South Eastern Railway zone	190 metres (620 ft)
Bhandaridah railway station	BHME	Bokaro district	South Eastern Railway zone	214 metres (702 ft)
Bhorwa Junction railway station	BCB	Dhanbad district	South Eastern Railway zone	200 metres (660 ft)
Bhojudih Junction railway station	BJE	Dhanbad district	South Eastern Railway zone	200 metres (660 ft)
Bhuli railway station	BHN	Dhanbad district	South Eastern Railway zone	200 metres (660 ft)
Bhurkunda railway station	BHKD	Ramgarh district	South Eastern Railway zone	200 metres (660 ft)
Bindubasini railway station	BDBS	Sahebganj district	South Eastern Railway zone	200 metres (660 ft)
Birarajpur railway station	BIRP	Saraikela Kharsawan district	South Eastern Railway zone	200 metres (660 ft)
Birbans railway station	BRBS	Saraikela Kharsawan district	South Eastern Railway zone	200 metres (660 ft)
Bokaro North Cabin railway station	BKSN	Bokaro district	South Eastern Railway zone	200 metres (660 ft)
Bokaro Steel City railway station	BKCA	Bokaro district	South Eastern Railway zone	200 metres (660 ft)
Bokaro Thermal railway station	BKRO	Bokaro district	South Eastern Railway zone	200 metres (660 ft)
Bonidanga Link Cabin railway station	BDLC	Sahebganj district	South Eastern Railway zone	200 metres (660 ft)
Budora railway station	BDQ	Dhanbad district	South Eastern Railway zone	200 metres (660 ft)
Chaibasa railway station	CBSA	West Singhbhum district	South Eastern Railway zone	227 metres (745 ft)
Chainpur railway station	CNPR	Ramgarh district	South Eastern Railway zone	200 metres (660 ft)
Chakradharpur railway station	CKP	West Singhbhum district	South Eastern Railway zone	200 metres (660 ft)
Chandanpahari railway station	CNPI	Dumka district	Eastern Railway zone	233 metres (764 ft)
Chandil Junction railway station	CNI	Saraikela Kharsawan district	South Eastern Railway zone	246 metres (807 ft)
Chandrapura railway station	CRP	Bokaro district	South Eastern Railway zone	200 metres (660 ft)
Chaube railway station	CBH	Koderma district	East Central Railway zone	326 metres (1,070 ft)
Chaudhribandh railway station	CBD	Giridih district	East Central Railway zone	200 metres (660 ft)
Chetar railway station	CTQ	Latehar district	South Eastern Railway zone	200 metres (660 ft)
Chhipadohar railway station	CPDR	Latehar district	South Eastern Railway zone	200 metres (660 ft)
Chhota Ambana railway station	CAM	Dhanbad district	South Eastern Railway zone	200 metres (660 ft)
Chianki railway station	CNF	Palamu district	South Eastern Railway zone	200 metres (660 ft)
Chichaki railway station	CCK	Giridih district	East Central Railway zone	337 metres (1,106 ft)
Daltonganj railway station	DTO	Palamu district	South Eastern Railway zone	520 metres (1,710 ft)
Danea railway station	DANEA	Bokaro district	South Eastern Railway zone	200 metres (660 ft)
Demu railway station	DEMU	Latehar district	South Eastern Railway zone	200 metres (660 ft)
Deoghar railway station	DGHR	Deoghar district	Eastern Railway zone	200 metres (660 ft)
Deonagar railway station	DNH	Bokaro district	South Eastern Railway zone	200 metres (660 ft)
Derawan Halt railway station	DON	West Singhbhum district	South Eastern Railway zone	200 metres (660 ft)
Derowan P. Halt railway station	DRWN	West Singhbhum district	South Eastern Railway zone	274 metres (899 ft)
Dhalbhumgarh railway station	DVM	East Singhbhum district	South Eastern Railway zone	200 metres (660 ft)
Dhamdhamia railway station	DDX	Sahebganj district	South Eastern Railway zone	200 metres (660 ft)
Dhanbad Junction railway station	DHN	Dhanbad district	East Central Railway zone	200 metres (660 ft)
Dugda railway station	DDGA	Bokaro district	South Eastern Railway zone	200 metres (660 ft)
Dumka railway station	DUMK	Dumka district	Eastern Railway zone	136 metres (446 ft)
Galudih railway station	GUD	East Singhbhum district	South Eastern Railway zone	200 metres (660 ft)
Gamarhia railway station	GMH	Saraikela Kharsawan district	South Eastern Railway zone	200 metres (660 ft)
Gangaghat railway station	GAG	Ranchi district	South Eastern Railway zone	543 metres (1,781 ft)
Garhwa railway station	GHQ	Garhwa district	South Eastern Railway zone	200 metres (660 ft)
Garwa Road Junction railway station	GHD	Palamu district	South Eastern Railway zone	200 metres (660 ft)
Giridih railway station	GRD	Giridih district	Eastern Railway zone	299 metres (981 ft)
Ghatsila railway station	GTS	East Singhbhum district	South Eastern Railway zone	200 metres (660 ft)
Ghormara railway station	GRMA	Deoghar district	Eastern Railway zone	252 metres (827 ft)
Goilkera railway station	GOL	West Singhbhum district	South Eastern Railway zone	330 metres (1,080 ft)
Gola Road railway station	GER	Ramgarh district	South Eastern Railway zone	200 metres (660 ft)
Govindpur Road railway station	GBX	Ranchi district	South Eastern Railway zone	577 metres (1,893 ft)
Gua railway station	GUA	West Singhbhum district	South Eastern Railway zone	441 metres (1,447 ft)
Gujhandi railway station	GJD	Koderma district	East Central Railway zone	835 metres (2,740 ft)
Gumani railway station	GMAN	Sahebganj district	East Central Railway zone	30 metres (98 ft)
Gumia railway station	GMIA	Bokaro district	South Eastern Railway zone	200 metres (660 ft)
Haludpukur railway station	HLD	East Singhbhum district	South Eastern Railway zone	193 metres (633 ft)
Hazaribagh Road railway station	HZD	Giridih district	East Central Railway zone	200 metres (660 ft)
Hazaribagh Town railway station	HZBN	Hazaribagh district	East Central Railway zone	200 metres (660 ft)
Haidernagar railway station	HDN	Palamu district	South Eastern Railway zone	200 metres (660 ft)
Hatia railway station	HTE	Ranchi district	South Eastern Railway zone	655 metres (2,149 ft)
Hendegir railway station	HNDR	Ramgarh district	South Eastern Railway zone	397 metres (1,302 ft)
Hirodih railway station	HRE	Koderma district	East Central Railway zone	374 metres (1,227 ft)
Itky railway station	ITKY	Ranchi district	South Eastern Railway zone	200 metres (660 ft)
Irgaon railway station	IRN	Lohardaga district	South Eastern Railway zone	200 metres (660 ft)
Jagadishpur railway station	JGD	Deoghar district	Eastern Railway zone	305 metres (1,001 ft)
Jama railway station	JAMA	Dumka district	Eastern Railway zone	207 metres (679 ft)
Jamadobu railway station	JBO	Dhanbad district	South Eastern Railway zone	194 metres (636 ft)
Jamtara railway station	JMT	Jamtara district	Eastern Railway zone	200 metres (660 ft)
Jamuni railway station	JMX	Dhanbad district	South Eastern Railway zone	200 metres (660 ft)
Januniatna railway station	JNN	Dhanbad district	South Eastern Railway zone	245 metres (804 ft)
Japla railway station	JPL	Palamu district	East Central Railway zone	149 metres (489 ft)
Jaraikela railway station	JRA	West Singhbhum district	South Eastern Railway zone	216 metres (709 ft)
Jarangdih railway station	JAN	Bokaro district	South Eastern Railway zone	214 metres (702 ft)
Jasidih Junction railway station	JSME	Deoghar district	Eastern Railway zone	200 metres (660 ft)
Jhinkpani railway station	JNK	West Singhbhum district	South Eastern Railway zone	296 metres (971 ft)
Jonha railway station	JON	Ranchi district	South Eastern Railway zone	470 metres (1,540 ft)
Joramow railway station	JR\W	Deoghar district	Eastern Railway zone	228 metres (748 ft)
Kajrat Nawadih railway station	KYF	Palamu district	East Central Railway zone	142 metres (466 ft)
Kajri railway station	KFT	Palamu district	East Central Railway zone	200 metres (660 ft)
Kalubathan railway station	KAO	Dhanbad district	South Eastern Railway zone	160 metres (520 ft)
Kalyan Chak railway station	KXE	Sahebganj district	Eastern Railway zone	200 metres (660 ft)
Kandra railway station	KND	Saraikela Kharsawan district	South Eastern Railway zone	200 metres (660 ft)
Karra railway station	KRRA	Khunti district	South Eastern Railway zone	641 metres (2,103 ft)
Kaseetar railway station	KEE	Jamtara district	Eastern Railway zone	219 metres (719 ft)
Katrasgarh railway station	KTH	Dhanbad district	South Eastern Railway zone	198 metres (650 ft)
Keckhi railway station	KCKI	Palamu district	South Eastern Railway zone	200 metres (660 ft)
kendposi railway station	KNPS	West Singhbhum district	South Eastern Railway zone	296 metres (971 ft)
Khanudihrailway station	KNF	Dhanbad district	South Eastern Railway zone	243 metres (797 ft)
Khario P. Halt railway station	KARO	Dhanbad district	South Eastern Railway zone	255 metres (837 ft)
Khalari railway station	KLRE	Ranchi district	East Central Railway zone	460 metres (1,510 ft)
Kharkhari railway station	KHRI	Dhanbad district	South Eastern Railway zone	227 metres (745 ft)
Kita railway station	KITA	Ranchi district	South Eastern Railway zone	318 metres (1,043 ft)
Koderma Junction railway station	KQR	Koderma district	East Central Railway zone	200 metres (660 ft)
Koderma Town railway station	KQRT	Koderma district	East Central Railway zone	200 metres (660 ft)
Kokpara railway station	KKPR	East Singhbhum district	South Eastern Railway zone	104 metres (341 ft)
Kosiara railway station	KVQ	Palamu district	East Central Railway zone	156 metres (512 ft)
Kotalpukur railway station	KLP	Sahebganj district	South Eastern Railway zone	40 metres (130 ft)
Krishna Ballabh railway station	KBSH	Giridih district	South Eastern Railway zone	200 metres (660 ft)
Kumrabad Rohini	KBQ	Deoghar district	Eastern Railway zone	200 metres (660 ft)
Kumardubi railway station	KMME	Dhanbad district	Eastern Railway zone	135 metres (443 ft)
Kumendi railway station	KMND	Latehar district	East Central Railway zone	352 metres (1,155 ft)
Kunki railway station	KZU	Saraikela Kharsawan district	South Eastern Railway zone	146 metres (479 ft)
Kurkura railway station	KRKR	Gumla district	South Eastern Railway zone	465 metres (1,526 ft)
Kusunda Junction railway station	KDS	Dhanbad district	East Central Railway zone	217 metres (712 ft)
Latehar railway station	LTHR	Latehar district	South Eastern Railway zone	381 metres (1,250 ft)
Layabad railway station	LYD	Dhanbad district	South Eastern Railway zone	191 metres (627 ft)
Lohardaga railway station	LAD	Lohardaga district	South Eastern Railway zone	643 metres (2,110 ft)
Lotapahar railway station	LPH	West Singhbhum district	South Eastern Railway zone	251 metres (823 ft)
Madankata railway station	MNC	Deoghar district	Eastern Railway zone	200 metres (660 ft)
Madanpur Halt railway station	MDNP	Dumka district	Eastern Railway zone	141 metres (463 ft)
Mael railway station	MAEL	Ramgarh district	South Eastern Railway zone	363 metres (1,191 ft)
Madhupur Junction railway station	MDP	Deoghar district	Eastern Railway zone	200 metres (660 ft)
Mahadevsal railway station	MXW	West Singhbhum district	South Eastern Railway zone	306 metres (1,004 ft)
Mahali Marup railway station	MVP	Saraikela Kharsawan district	South Eastern Railway zone	200 metres (660 ft)
Maheshmunda railway station	MMD	Giridih district	South Eastern Railway zone	289 metres (948 ft)
Mahuamilanrailway station	MMLN	Latehar district	East Central Railway zone	493 metres (1,617 ft)
Mahuda Junction railway station	MHQ	Dhanbad district	South Eastern Railway zone	200 metres (660 ft)
Malkera Junction railway station	MLQ	Dhanbad district	South Eastern Railway zone	199 metres (653 ft)
Maluka railway station	MLK	West Singhbhum district	South Eastern Railway zone	438 metres (1,437 ft)
Manikui railway station	MIK	Saraikela Kharsawan district	South Eastern Railway zone	200 metres (660 ft)
Manoharpur railway station	MOU	West Singhbhum district	South Eastern Railway zone	252 metres (827 ft)
Matari railway station	MRQ	Dhanbad district	South Eastern Railway zone	245 metres (804 ft)
Mathurapur railway station	MUW	Deoghar district	Eastern Railway zone	200 metres (660 ft)
McCluskieGanj railway station	MGME	Ranchi district	South Eastern Railway zone	476 metres (1,562 ft)
Meralgram railway station	MQX	Garhwa district	South Eastern Railway zone	200 metres (660 ft)
Mohanpur railway station	MHUR	Deoghar district	Eastern Railway zone	200 metres (660 ft)
Moharajpur railway station	MJP	Katihar district	South Eastern Railway zone	34 metres (112 ft)
Muhammadganj railway station	MDJ	Palamu district	South Eastern Railway zone	200 metres (660 ft)
Mugma railway station	MMU	Dhanbad district	Eastern Railway zone	133 metres (436 ft)
Muri Junction railway station	MURI	Ranchi district	South Eastern Railway zone	200 metres (660 ft)
Murli Halt railway station	MRLI	Sahebganj district	Eastern Railway zone	33 metres (108 ft)
Nagar Untari railway station	NUQ	Garhwa district	South Eastern Railway zone	200 metres (660 ft)
Nagjua railway station	NAJ	Lohardaga district	South Eastern Railway zone	690 metres (2,260 ft)
Namkon railway station	NKM	Ranchi district	South Eastern Railway zone	200 metres (660 ft)
Narkopi railway station	NRKP	Ranchi district	South Eastern Railway zone	696 metres (2,283 ft)
Nawadih Halt railway station	NWDH	Deoghar district	Eastern Railway zone	200 metres (660 ft)
Netaji Subhas Chandra Bose Gomoh railway station	GMO	Dhanbad district	South Eastern Railway zone	239 metres (784 ft)
New Giridih railway station	NGRH	Giridih district	East Central Railway zone	334 metres (1,096 ft)
New Madanpur railway station	MRPU	Dumka district	Eastern Railway zone	200 metres (660 ft)
Nichitpur railway station	NPJE	Dhanbad district	East Central Railway zone	224 metres (735 ft)
Nimdih railway station	NIM	Saraikela Kharsawan district	South Eastern Railway zone	211 metres (692 ft)
Nimiaghat railway station	NMG	Bokaro district	East Central Railway zone	268 metres (879 ft)
Noamundi railway station	NOMD	West Singhbhum district	South Eastern Railway zone	448 metres (1,470 ft)
Orga railway station	ORGA	Sundargarh district	South Eastern Railway zone	227 metres (745 ft)
Pada Pahar Junction railway station	PDPH	West Singhbhum district	South Eastern Railway zone	462 metres (1,516 ft)
Pakra railway station	PKC	Gumla district	South Eastern Railway zone	503 metres (1,650 ft)
Pakur railway station	PKR	Pakur district	Eastern Railway zone	200 metres (660 ft)
Pandrasali railway station	PRSL	West Singhbhum district	South Eastern Railway zone	225 metres (738 ft)
Parasnath railway station	PNME	Giridih district	South Eastern Railway zone	200 metres (660 ft)
Parsabad railway station	PSB	Koderma district	East Central Railway zone	345 metres (1,132 ft)
Pathardih Junction railway station	PEH	Dhanbad district	East Central Railway zone	200 metres (660 ft)
Patratu railway station	PTRU	Ramgarh district	South Eastern Railway zone	219 metres (719 ft)
Phulwartanr railway station	PLJE	Dhanbad district	East Central Railway zone	219 metres (719 ft)
Phusro railway station	PUS	Bokaro district	South Eastern Railway zone	216 metres (709 ft)
Piska railway station	PIS	Ranchi district	South Eastern Railway zone	708 metres (2,323 ft)
Pokla railway station	PKF	Simdega district	South Eastern Railway zone	548 metres (1,798 ft)
Posotia railway station	PST	West Singhbhum district	South Eastern Railway zone	200 metres (660 ft)
Pradhankhunta railway station	PKA	Dhanbad district	South Eastern Railway zone	200 metres (660 ft)
Pundhag railway station	PNW	Bokaro district	South Eastern Railway zone	291 metres (955 ft)
Radhagaon railway station	RDF	Bokaro district	South Eastern Railway zone	247 metres (810 ft)
Rajabera Link Cabin railway station	RJB	Bokaro district	East Central Railway zone	193 metres (633 ft)
Rajhura railway station	RHR	Palamu district	South Eastern Railway zone	210 metres (690 ft)
Rajkharsawan Junction railway station	RKSN	Saraikela Kharsawan district	South Eastern Railway zone	189 metres (620 ft)
Rajmahal railway station	RJL	Sahebganj district	South Eastern Railway zone	200 metres (660 ft)
Rakha Mines railway station	RHE	East Singhbhum district	South Eastern Railway zone	200 metres (660 ft)
Rakhitpur railway station	RKJE	Dhanbad district	East Central Railway zone	200 metres (660 ft)
Ramgarh Cantt railway station	RMT	Ramgarh district	South Eastern Railway zone	200 metres (660 ft)
Ramna railway station	RMF	Garhwa district	East Central Railway zone	245 metres (804 ft)
Ranchi railway station	RNC	Ranchi district	South Eastern Railway zone	200 metres (660 ft)
Ranchi Road railway station	RRME	Ramgarh district	South Eastern Railway zone	357 metres (1,171 ft)
Ray railway station	RAY	Chatra district	South Eastern Railway zone	441 metres (1,447 ft)
Richughutu railway station	RCGT	Latehar district	South Eastern Railway zone	200 metres (660 ft)
Sahibganj Junction railway station	SBG	Sahebganj district	Eastern Railway zone	40 metres (130 ft)
Sakrigali Junction railway station	SLJ	Sahebganj district	Eastern Railway zone	45 metres (148 ft)
Salga Jhari railway station	SLJR	East Singhbhum district	South Eastern Railway zone	169 metres (554 ft)
Shankarpur railway station	SNQ	Deoghar district	Eastern Railway zone	235 metres (771 ft)
Sarmatanr railway station	SMND	Koderma district	South Eastern Railway zone	351 metres (1,152 ft)
Satbahini railway station	SZF	Palamu district	South Eastern Railway zone	160 metres (520 ft)
Satsang Nagar Halt railway station	SSNR	Deoghar district	Eastern Railway zone	255 metres (837 ft)
Shewbabudih railway station	SBW	Dhanbad district	South Eastern Railway zone	159 metres (522 ft)
Sigsigi railway station	SQS	Palamu district	South Eastern Railway zone	181 metres (594 ft)
Sijua railway station	SJA	Dhanbad district	East Central Railway zone	207 metres (679 ft)
Silli railway station	SLF	Ranchi district	South Eastern Railway zone	269 metres (883 ft)
Sindri B H railway station	SDBH	Dhanbad district	South Eastern Railway zone	200 metres (660 ft)
Sindri Marshalling Yard railway station	SNMY	Dhanbad district	South Eastern Railway zone	200 metres (660 ft)
Sindri Town railway station	SNDT	Purulia district	South Eastern Railway zone	200 metres (660 ft)
Singhpokharia railway station	SIPA	West Singhbhum district	South Eastern Railway zone	200 metres (660 ft)
Sini Junction railway station	SINI	Saraikela Kharsawan district	South Eastern Railway zone	200 metres (660 ft)
Sonardih railway station	SZE	Dhanbad district	South Eastern Railway zone	200 metres (660 ft)
Sonua Railway station	SWR	West Singhbhum district	South Eastern Railway zone	200 metres (660 ft)
Talaburu railway station	TABU	West Singhbhum district	South Eastern Railway zone	365 metres (1,198 ft)
Talgaria railway station	TLE	Dhanbad district	South Eastern Railway zone	188 metres (617 ft)
Taljhari railway station	TLJ	Sahebganj district	Eastern Railway zone	38 metres (125 ft)
Tangarbasuli railway station	TGB	Ranchi district	South Eastern Railway zone	712 metres (2,336 ft)
Tatanagar Junction railway station	TATA	East Singhbhum district	South Eastern Railway zone	200 metres (660 ft)
Tata Sijua Halt railway station	TSAH	Dhanbad district	South Eastern Railway zone	194 metres (636 ft)
Tatisilwai railway station	TIS	Ranchi district	South Eastern Railway zone	200 metres (660 ft)
Telo railway station	TELO	Dhanbad district	South Eastern Railway zone	200 metres (660 ft)
Tentulla railway station	TNJE	Dhanbad district	South Eastern Railway zone	200 metres (660 ft)
Tetulmari railway station	TET	Dhanbad district	South Eastern Railway zone	200 metres (660 ft)
Thapar Nagar railway station	TNW	Dhanbad district	South Eastern Railway zone	200 metres (660 ft)
Tinpahar Junction railway station	TPH	Sahebganj district	South Eastern Railway zone	200 metres (660 ft)
Tilbhita railway station	TBB	Pakur district	South Eastern Railway zone	34 metres (112 ft)
Tiraldih railway station	TUL	Saraikela Kharsawan district	South Eastern Railway zone	200 metres (660 ft)
Tolra railway station	TRZ	Palamu district	East Central Railway zone	192 metres (630 ft)
Tokisud railway station	TKS	Ramgarh district	South Eastern Railway zone	374 metres (1,227 ft)
Tori railway station	TORI	Latehar district	South Eastern Railway zone	200 metres (660 ft)
Tundu railway station	TNO	Dhanbad district	South Eastern Railway zone	194 metres (636 ft)
Tunia railway station	TUX	West Singhbhum district	South Eastern Railway zone	298 metres (978 ft)
Tupkadih railway station	TKB	Bokaro district	South Eastern Railway zone	233 metres (764 ft)
Untari Road railway station	URD	Palamu district	South Eastern Railway zone	200 metres (660 ft)
Vidyasagar railway station	VDS	Jamtara district	Eastern Railway zone	244 metres (801 ft)
Yadudih railway station	YDD	Koderma district	East Central Railway zone	352 metres (1,155 ft)

== Top 10 Railway stations in Jharkhand ==
1. Dhanbad Junction railway station
2. Koderma Junction railway station
3. Tatanagar Junction railway station
4. Ranchi Junction railway station
5. Jasidih Junction railway station
6. Netaji Subhas Chandra Bose Gomoh railway station
7. Barkakana Junction railway station
8. Hatia railway station
9. Bokaro Steel City railway station
10. Madhupur Junction railway station
