= Loco Colony, Jamshedpur =

Colony in Jamshedpur, Jharkhand (India)

Loco colony
- Colony in India
- Location within Jharkhand Location within India
- Coordinates: 22.7635380°N 86.2165692°E
- Country: India
- State: Jharkhand
- District: East Singhbhum district
- Block: Golmuri-cum-Jugsalai
- City: Jamshedpur

Area
  - Total: 0.6475 km^{2} (0.2500 sq mi)

Population
  - Total: 1,303
  - Density: 2,012/km^{2} (5,212/sq mi)
- Time zone: UTC+5:30 (IST)
- Vehicle registration: JH-05

Loco Colony is a colony in Jamshedpur city in Golmuri-cum-Jugsalai block of East Singhbhum district, Jharkhand, India. It's boundaries are surrounded by railway lines. Loco colony Pahari Mandir is also situated here.

== Geography ==
Locations in Jamshedpur
M: municipality, R: rural/ urban centre, CT: census town, S: station, P: plant, B: block
Owing to space constraints in the small map, the actual locations in a larger map may vary slightly

Loco Colony has an approximate area of 64.75 hectares (160.0 acres), with population density estimated at 0.002012 inhabitants per square metre (20.12/ha; 8.14/acre), and is part of Burma Mines. Bagbera colony census town does own a part of Loco Colony. It is adjacent to Makdumpur, Shankarpur, Salgajhari, Parsudih at south, Tatanagar Residental colony, Burma Mines at west, Bamangora, Barigora, Jojobera, Telco colony at east, and Bajrangi Bagan, Jemco Azad Basti, Lakshimi Nagar, Carriage Colony at north.

== Transportation ==
=== Railways ===
Salga Jhari:

It is a cabin.

Tatanagar Junction:

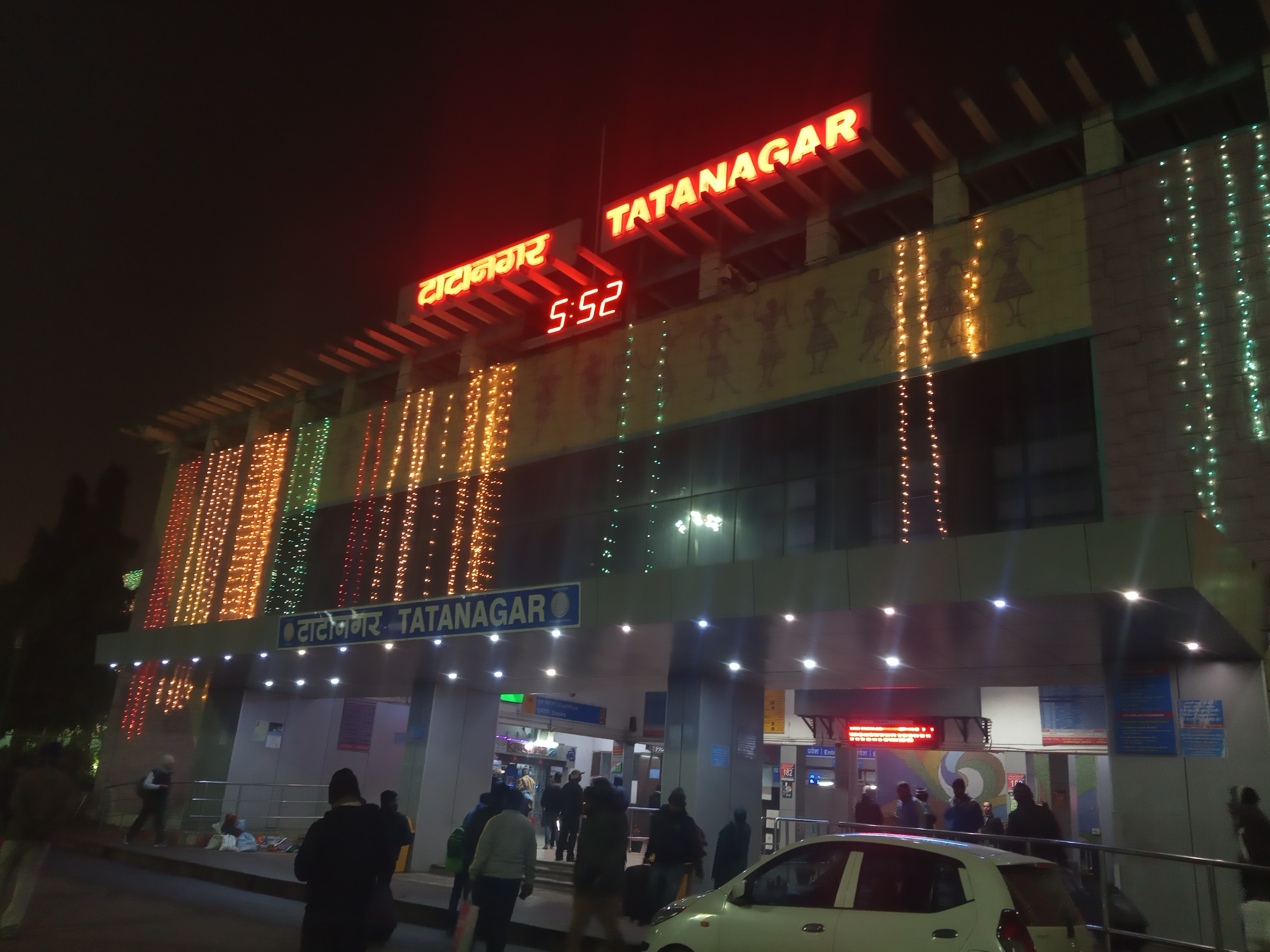
Tatanagar Junction railway station

Tatanagar Junction railway station (Code:TATA) is a railway station. It provided connectivity to residents. It consists of 5 platforms (Currently has 6 platforms), and 8 tracks. It is situated in Chakradharpur railway division and South Eastern Railway zone (SER). The station grade is A and Station category is NSG-2. Private buses are available here. Nearby stations include Adityapur, Govindpur, Gamharia Junction, Asanboni, Birajapur, Kandra Junction, Rakha Mines, Kunki, Manikui, Sini Junction, Mahali Murup, Galudih, Ghatsila, Rajkharsawan Junction, Chandil Junction, Pandrasali, Chaibasa, etc. The railway station is planned for redevelopment with redevelopment cost figures around ₹283C - ₹350 crores.

== Sports ==
Loco ground is situated here with football and cricket mainly played here.

== Healthcare ==
Loco Health unit Tatanagar Government hospital

The loco health unit hospital is primarily used for Railway employees and Locomotive pilots.

== Education ==
Government School, Loco Colony

There are two schools in the area:

1. Government School (Loco Colony Middle School)
2. Old Kendriya Vidyalaya

== Demographics ==
The colony is completely urban.
