= Derowan railway station =

Railway Station in Jharkhand

Derowan Railway Station

General information
- Location: Deruan, West Singhbhum district, Jharkhand; India
- Coordinates: 22.48785°N 85.29956°E
- Elevation: 274 m (899 ft)
- System: Passenger halt station
- Owner: Indian Railways
- Operator: South Eastern Railway
- Line: Howrah–Nagpur–Mumbai line
- Platforms: 2 (under up-gradation)

Construction
- Structure type: Standard (on ground station)

Other information
- Status: Functioning
- Station code: DRWN
- Zone(s): South Eastern Railway zone
- Division(s): Chakradharpur railway division

History
- Former names: Bengal Nagpur Railway
Location
- Location within India Location within Jharkhand

Derowan Railway Station is a passenger halt station on Howrah–Nagpur–Mumbai line under Chakradharpur railway division of South Eastern Railway zone. It is situated at Deruan, West Singhbhum district in the Indian state of Jharkhand. It is 36 km (22 mi) from Chakradharpur railway station.
