= Kalawade =

Village in Maharashtra

- Interactive map of Kalawade
- Country: India
- State: Maharashtra
- Division: Pune
- District: Karad

Kalawade (or Kalvade), is a village in Maharashtra, India.

== Geography ==
It is 251.09 km away from the state capital, Mumbai,

Nearby villages and towns include Patan Taluka towards the west, Kadegaon Taluka towards the East, and Shirala Taluka and Valva-Islampur Taluka to the South. Nearby cities include Karad, Islampur and Mahuli.

The locals are predominantly Hindu, with three temples in the village itself, and at least four more in the surrounding area. The Pratibhanagar School is nearby. According to Census data, Kalawade has a slightly higher literacy rate than the state's average, 83.46% compared to 82.34% of Maharashtra, literacy rates were higher with males than females. Most people work on farms, whilst a smaller percentage engage in local business.

== Chilaai Devi Temple ==
Chilaai Devi Mandir is the most visited of several Hindu temples in the area. It features a venerated portrait of a celebrated figure in Hinduism, and an old well.

It dates to India's medieval period (750-1250 AD), or earlier.

It serves as a center for worship, and hosts the traditional premarital rituals (known as sodane), along with the weddings.

== Demographics ==
The most commonly spoken language in Kalawade is Marathi.

The village has a population of 4,658 people in 947 households. Population of children with age 0-6 is 498, 10.69% of the total. The average sex ratio is 990, higher than Maharashtra state average of 929. Child sex ratio is 879, lower than Maharashtra average of 894.

== Transport ==
=== Road ===
It is an 11.2 km drive from the nearby town of Undale via the Patil Mala road, or a 3.7 km drive south from the town of Kale along the same road. The Patil Mala road cuts through the village. The road branches 2.5 km south to the town of Belwade Budruk. The village is directly connected to India's National Highway 48 by an unnamed road 2.91 km east of the village.

=== Rail ===
As of February 2019, no railways serve the area: the nearest line is about 14.7 km away, where it parallels National Highway 75. The nearest station is in the village of Shenoli.

=== Air ===
Kalawade is 67.5 km North of Kolhapur Airport. It is semi-directly connected to Kolhapur city via National Highway 48.
