= GMH =

GMH may refer to:

- Gandhi Medical College, in Hyderabad, India
- Georgsmarienhütte, a town in Lower Saxony, Germany
- General Mediterranean Holding, a Luxembourg holding company
- General Motors railway station, Melbourne, Australia
- Georgian Manganese Holding, in the Republic of Georgia
- Gibraltar Medallion of Honour, a civil award scheme of Gibraltar
- GivesMeHope, a now defunct American user-generated blog website
- GMH railway station, Elizabeth South, South Australia
- Gray matter hyperintensity, in neuroimaging
- Guam Memorial Hospital
- Holden, the Australian car making division of General Motors
- Middle High German ISO 639-2 and ISO 639-3 language codes
- Gamharia Junction railway station (station code: GMH), Jharkhand, India
