= BFQ =

BFQ or bfq may refer to:

== Transportation ==
- Bahia Piña (IATA code) an airport in Panama
- Bendi railway station (station code), in the Railway stations in Jharkhand
- BFQ, engine code for one of the Volkswagen EA827 engine family

== Other uses ==
- Badaga language (ISO 639-3 code: bfq)
- Bite force quotient, of animals
- Budget Fair Queueing, a Linux I/O scheduler
