= Howrah–Rourkela Vande Bharat Express =

Mini Vande Bharat Express train route in India

Howrah Junction – Rourkela Junction Vande Bharat Express

Overview
- Service type: Vande Bharat Express
- Locale: West Bengal, Jharkhand and Odisha
- First service: 15 September 2024 (Inaugural); 18 September 2024; 17 months ago (Commercial)
- Current operator: South Eastern Railways (SER)

Route
- Termini: Howrah Junction (HWH); Rourkela Junction (ROU)
- Stops: 03
- Distance travelled: 412 km (256 mi)
- Average journey time: 05 hrs 50 mins
- Service frequency: Six days a week (Note: Except Tuesdays)
- Train number: 20871 / 20872
- Line used: Howrah–Nagpur–Mumbai line (till Rourkela Junction)

On-board services
- Classes: AC Chair Car, AC Executive Chair Car
- Seating arrangements: Airline style; Rotatable seats
- Sleeping arrangements: No
- Catering facilities: On board Catering
- Observation facilities: Large windows in all coaches
- Entertainment facilities: On-board WiFi; Infotainment System; Electric outlets; Reading light; Seat Pockets; Bottle Holder; Tray Table
- Baggage facilities: Overhead racks
- Other facilities: Kavach

Technical
- Rolling stock: Mini Vande Bharat 2.0 (Last service: Oct 18 2025); Vande Bharat 2.0 (First service: Oct 19 2025)
- Track gauge: Indian gauge 1,676 mm (5 ft 6 in) broad gauge
- Electrification: 25 kV 50 Hz AC Overhead line
- Operating speed: 71 km/h (44 mph) (Avg.)
- Average length: 384 metres (1,260 ft) (16 coaches)
- Track owner: Indian Railways
- Rake maintenance: Santragachi Jn (SRC)

The 20871/20872 Howrah - Rourkela Vande Bharat Express is India's 58th Vande Bharat Express train, connecting the metropolitan and twin city of Kolkata, Howrah in West Bengal with the smart city of Rourkela in Odisha.

This express train was inaugurated on September 15, 2024, by Prime Minister Narendra Modi via video conferencing from the capital city of Ranchi instead of physically inaugurating at Tatanagar Junction in Jharkhand due to continuous rains in Jamshedpur.

== Overview ==
This train is currently operated by Indian Railways, connecting Howrah Jn, Kharagpur Jn, Tatanagar Jn, Chakradharpur and Rourkela Jn. It currently operates with train numbers 20871/20872 on 6 days a week basis.

== Rakes ==
It is the fifty-fifth 2nd Generation and thirty-ninth Mini Vande Bharat 2.0 Express train which was designed and manufactured by the Integral Coach Factory at Perambur, Chennai under the Make in India Initiative.

=== Coach augmentation ===
As per latest updates, this express train was augmented with 08 additional AC coaches, thereby running with Vande Bharat 2.0 trainset W.E.F. 19 October 2025 in order to enhance passenger capacity and make travel convenient on this route.

== Service ==
The 20871/20872 Howrah Jn - Rourkela Jn Vande Bharat Express operates six days a week except Tuesdays, covering a distance of 412 km (256 mi) in a travel time of 5 hours with an average speed of 71 km/h (44 mph). The Maximum Permissible Speed is 130 km/h (81 mph).

== See also ==
- Vande Bharat Express
- Tejas Express
- Gatiman Express
- Howrah Junction railway station
- Rourkela Junction railway station
