= Kokpara railway station =

Railway Station in Jharkhand

Kokpara Railway Station

General information
- Location: Station Road, Kokpara, East Singhbhum district, Jharkhand; India
- Coordinates: 22.474843°N 86.634562°E
- Elevation: 104 m (341 ft)
- System: Passenger train station
- Owner: Indian Railways
- Operator: South Eastern Railway
- Line: Howrah–Nagpur–Mumbai line
- Platforms: 4

Construction
- Structure type: Standard (on ground station)

Other information
- Status: Functioning
- Station code: KKPR
- Zone(s): South Eastern Railway zone
- Division(s): Kharagpur railway division

History
- Former names: Bengal Nagpur Railway
Location
- Location within India Location within Jharkhand

Kokpara Railway Station is an Indian railway station on Howrah–Nagpur–Mumbai line under Kharagpur railway division of South Eastern Railway zone. It is situated at Kokpara in East Singhbhum district in the state of Jharkhand. It is 38 km (24 mi) from Jhargram railway station and 58 km (36 mi) from Tatanagar Junction.
