= Jabalpur–Santragachi Humsafar Express =

Fast express train of the Indian Railways

Jabalpur - Santragachi Humsafar Express

Overview
- Service type: Humsafar Express
- First service: 1 August 2018; 7 years ago
- Current operator(s): South Eastern Railways

Route
- Termini: Jabalpur Junction (JBP); Santragachi Junction (SRC)
- Stops: 9
- Distance travelled: 1,117 km (694 mi)
- Average journey time: 19 hours 40 mins
- Service frequency: Weekly (Note: Runs one days in a week for every direction.)
- Train number(s): 20827 / 20828

On-board services
- Class(es): AC 3 tier
- Seating arrangements: Yes
- Sleeping arrangements: Yes
- Catering facilities: Available
- Observation facilities: Large windows

Technical
- Rolling stock: LHB Humsafar
- Track gauge: 1,676 mm (5 ft 6 in)
- Operating speed: 56 km/h (35 mph) Avg. Speed

The 20827 / 20828 Jabalpur - Santragachi Humsafar Express is a superfast express train of the Indian Railways connecting Santragachi in West Bengal and Jabalpur in Madhya Pradesh. It is currently being operated with 20827/20828 train numbers on a weekly basis.

== Coach composition ==
The trains is completely 3-tier AC sleeper trains designed by Indian Railways with features of LED screen display to show information about stations, train speed etc. and will have announcement system as well, Vending machines for tea, coffee and milk, Bio toilets in compartments as well as CCTV cameras.

== Service ==
The 20827/Jabalpur - Santragachi Humsafar Express has an average speed of 56 km/h, and covers 1117 km in 19h 50m.

The 20828/Santragachi - Jabalpur Humsafar Express has an average speed of 57 km/h, and covers 1117 km in 19h 30m.

== Route and halts ==
- Jabalpur Junction
- Katni South
- Shahdol
- Bilaspur
- Raigarh
- Jharsuguda
- Rourkela
- Chakradharpur
- Tatanagar
- Kharagpur
- Santragachi Junction

== Traction ==
Both trains are hauled by Santragachi Electric Loco Shed based WAP-7 locomotive.

== Rake sharing ==
The train shares its rake with 20821/20822 Santragachi-Pune Humsafar Express.

== See also ==
- Humsafar Express
- Jabalpur Junction railway station
- Santragachi Junction railway station
