= Dahinsara =

Dahinsara also sometimes written as a Dahisara, located in the province of Bhuj, Kutch, which lies in the western part of Gujarat, India. It is a large village with total 938 families residing. The village is occupied with population of 4331 of which 2154 are males while 2177 are females as per Population Census 2011.

In Dahinsara village population of children with age 0-6 is 531 which makes up 12.26 % of total population of village. Average Sex Ratio of Dahinsara village is 1011 which is higher than Gujarat state average of 919. Child Sex Ratio for the Dahinsara as per census is 952, higher than Gujarat average of 890.

Dahinsara village has lower literacy rate compared to Gujarat. In 2011, literacy rate of Dahinsara village was 74.34 % compared to 78.03 % of Gujarat. In Dahinsara Male literacy stands at 83.53 % while female literacy rate was 65.33 %.
