= GJD =

GJD could refer to:

- Gap junction δ, subcategory of gap junction proteins in biology
- Geocentric Julian Day
- Gujhandi railway station, a station in Koderma district, Jharkand, India; see Railway stations in Jharkhand
