= Birbans railway station =

Railway Station in Jharkhand

Birbans Railway Station

General information
- Location: Tirildih, Seraikela Kharsawan district, Jharkhand; India
- Coordinates: 22.794045°N 86.014212°E
- Elevation: 171 m (561 ft)
- System: Passenger train station
- Owner: Indian Railways
- Operator: South Eastern Railway
- Line: Howrah–Nagpur–Mumbai line
- Platforms: 2

Construction
- Structure type: Standard (on ground station)

Other information
- Status: Functioning
- Station code: BRBS
- Zone(s): South Eastern Railway zone
- Division(s): Chakradharpur railway division

History
- Former names: Bengal Nagpur Railway
Location
- Location within India Location within Jharkhand

Birbans Railway Station is a railway station on Howrah–Nagpur–Mumbai line under Chakradharpur railway division of South Eastern Railway zone. It is situated at Tirildih, Seraikela Kharsawan district in the Indian state of Jharkhand. It is 20 km (12 mi) from Tatanagar Junction.
