= Tunia railway station =

Railway Station in Jharkhand

Tunia Railway Station

General information
- Location: Tunia, West Singhbhum district, Jharkhand; India
- Coordinates: 22.544837°N 85.428663°E
- System: Passenger train station
- Owner: Indian Railways
- Operator: South Eastern Railway
- Line: Howrah–Nagpur–Mumbai line
- Platforms: 2 (under up-gradation)

Construction
- Structure type: Standard (on ground station)

Other information
- Status: Functioning
- Station code: TUX
- Zone(s): South Eastern Railway zone
- Division(s): Chakradharpur railway division

History
- Former names: Bengal Nagpur Railway
Location
- Location within India Location within Jharkhand

Tunia Railway Station is a railway station on Howrah–Nagpur–Mumbai line under Chakradharpur railway division of South Eastern Railway zone. It is situated at Tunia, West Singhbhum district in the Indian state of Jharkhand. It is 27 km (17 mi) from Chakradharpur railway station.
