= Sini Junction railway station =

Railway station in Jharkhand

Sini Junction Railway Station

General information
- Location: Sini, Seraikela Kharsawan district, Jharkhand; India
- Coordinates: 22.789452°N 85.947142°E
- Elevation: 183 m (600 ft)
- System: Express train and Passenger train station
- Owner: Indian Railways
- Operator: South Eastern Railway
- Lines: Howrah–Nagpur–Mumbai line Sini–Kandra–Asansol branch line
- Platforms: 3

Construction
- Structure type: Standard (on-ground station)

Other information
- Status: Functioning
- Station code: SINI
- Zone(s): South Eastern Railway zone
- Division(s): Chakradharpur

History
- Opened: 1889
- Former names: Bengal Nagpur Railway
Location
- Location within India Location within Jharkhand

Sini Junction Railway Station is a railway station on Howrah–Nagpur–Mumbai line under Chakradharpur railway division of South Eastern Railway zone. It is situated at Sini, Seraikela Kharsawan district in the Indian state of Jharkhand. It is 27 km (17 mi) from Tatanagar Junction and 35 km (22 mi) from Chakradharpur railway station.

== Electrification ==
The Sini–Tatanagar section was electrified in 1961–62.
