= MQX (disambiguation) =

MQX is an operating system.

MQX or mqx can also refer to:

- Alula Aba Nega Airport, an airport in Mekelle, Ethiopia, by IATA code
- Meralgram railway station, a train station in Garhwa district, Jharkhand state, India; see Railway stations in Jharkhand
- Mamuju language, a language spoken in Sulawesi island, Indonesia, by ISO 639 code
