= RJL =

RJL may refer to:

- RJL, the IATA code for Logroño–Agoncillo Airport, La Rioja, Spain
- RJL, the Indian Railways station code for Rajmahal railway station, Jharkhand, India
