= Gamharia Junction railway station =

Railway Station in Jharkhand

GAMHARIA JUNCTION
- Indian Railways logo

General information
- Location: Tata Kandra Road, Gamharia, Jamshedpur, Seraikela Kharsawan district, Jharkhand; India
- Coordinates: 22.796431°N 86.101534°E
- Elevation: 123 m (404 ft)
- System: Express train and Passenger train station
- Owner: Indian Railways
- Operator: South Eastern Railway
- Lines: Howrah–Nagpur–Mumbai line Tatanagar–Gamharia–Kandra branch line
- Platforms: 4

Construction
- Structure type: Standard (on-ground station)

Other information
- Status: Functioning
- Station code: GMH
- Zone(s): South Eastern Railway zone
- Division(s): Chakradharpur

History
- Former names: Bengal Nagpur Railway
Location
- Location within India Location within Jharkhand
- Interactive map of Gamharia Junction

Gamharia Junction Railway Station is a railway station on Howrah–Nagpur–Mumbai line under Chakradharpur railway division of South Eastern Railway zone. It is situated at Gamharia, Seraikela Kharsawan district in the Indian state of Jharkhand. It is 11 km (7 mi) from Tatanagar Junction.

Most trains are westbound and northbound but none of the train originate at Gamharia Junction railway station. It handles 26 trains daily.

The Howrah–Mumbai main line and the Tatanagar–Asansol line diverge from here.
