= Galudih railway station =

Railway Station in Jharkhand

Galudih Railway Station

General information
- Location: Mahulia, Galudih, East Singhbhum district, Jharkhand; India
- Coordinates: 22.586216°N 86.479044°E
- Elevation: 115 m (377 ft)
- System: Passenger train station
- Owner: Indian Railways
- Operator: South Eastern Railway
- Line: Howrah–Nagpur–Mumbai line
- Platforms: 4

Construction
- Structure type: Standard (on ground station)

Other information
- Status: Functioning
- Station code: GUD
- Zone(s): South Eastern Railway zone
- Division(s): Kharagpur railway division

History
- Former names: Bengal Nagpur Railway
Location
- Location within India Location within Jharkhand

Galudih Railway Station is a railway station on Howrah–Nagpur–Mumbai line under Kharagpur railway division of South Eastern Railway zone. It is situated at Galudih- Mahulia in East Singhbhum district in the Indian state of Jharkhand. It is 26 km (16 mi) from Tatanagar Junction.
