= Azad Hind Express =

Train in India

Overview
- Service type: Superfast Express
- Locale: Maharashtra, Chhattisgarh, Odisha, Jharkhand & West Bengal
- First service: 2 February 1996; 30 years ago
- Current operator: Central Railway

Route
- Termini: Pune (PUNE); Howrah (HWH)
- Stops: 31
- Distance travelled: 2,014 km (1,251 mi)
- Service frequency: Daily
- Train number: 12129 / 12130

On-board services
- Classes: AC 2 Tier, AC 3 Tier, Sleeper Class, General Unreserved
- Seating arrangements: Yes
- Sleeping arrangements: Yes
- Catering facilities: Available
- Observation facilities: Large windows
- Baggage facilities: Available
- Other facilities: Below the seats

Technical
- Rolling stock: LHB coach
- Track gauge: 1,676 mm (5 ft 6 in)
- Operating speed: 58 km/h (36 mph) average including halts.
Route map
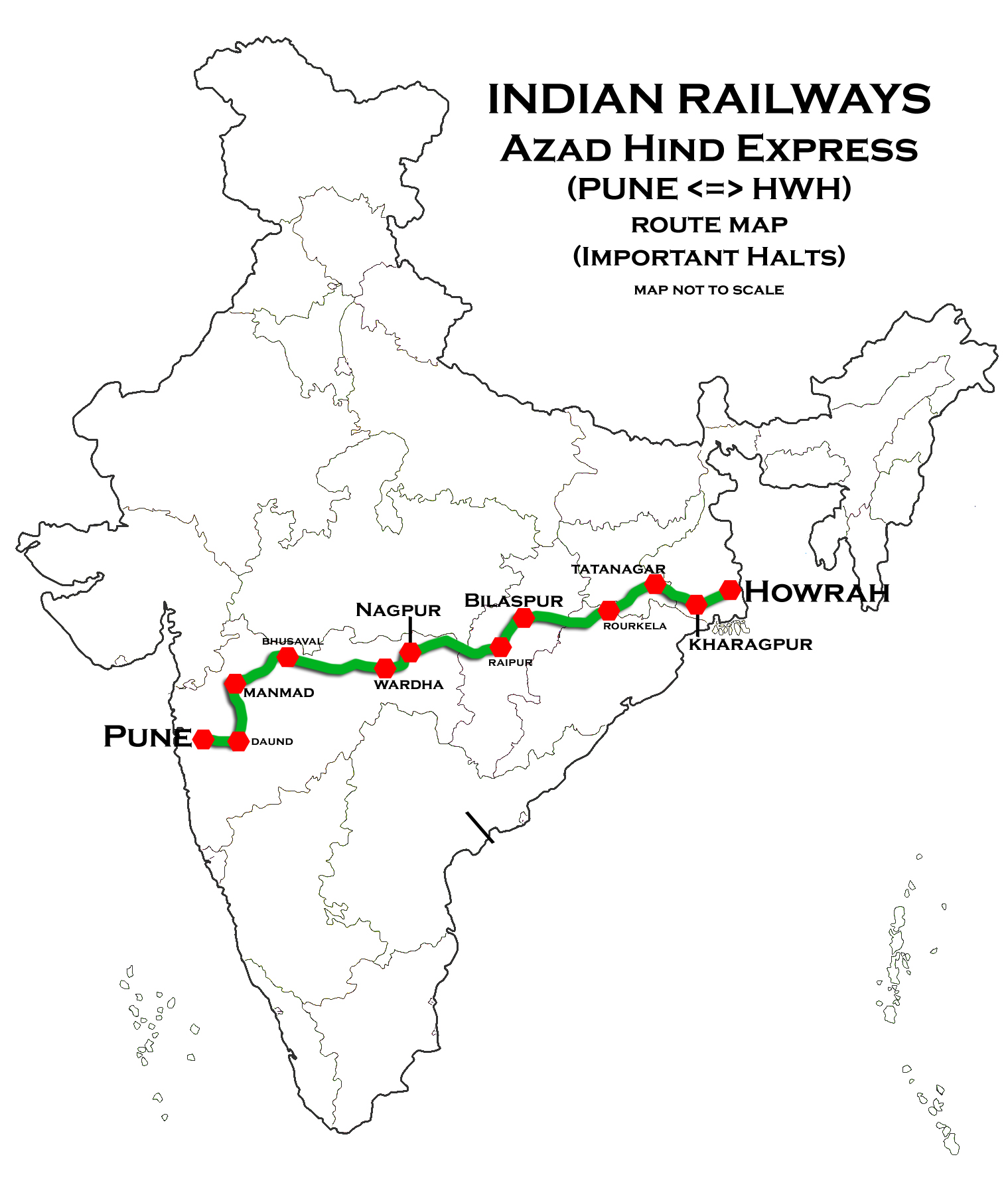

The 12129 / 12130 Azad Hind Express is a daily superfast express train operated by the Central Railway zone of Indian Railways connecting Pune with Howrah. Introduced in 1996, this train service is a tribute to Netaji Subash Chandra Bose. It is named after the Azad Hind Fauj that was led by him.

== Timings ==
It often gets rescheduled. So passengers are advised to check arrival and departure times before boarding.

== Traction ==
The train is hauled by a Bhusawal Loco Shed based WAP-4 or Pune Loco Shed based WAP-7 electric locomotive on its entire journey.

== Coaches ==
The train runs with 22 Integrated-Coach-Factory(ICF)coaches. It has four dedicated rakes whose primary maintenance is done at Pune and secondary maintenance is done at Santragachhi.

Legends
EOG/SLR	PC	MIL	H	A	HA	B	AB	G	K	E	C	S	D	GEN/UR
Generator cum luggage van	Pantry car or Hot buffet car	Military coach	First AC (1A)	Second AC (2A)	First AC cum Second AC	Third AC (3A)	Third AC cum Second AC	Third AC economy (3E)	Anubhuti coach (K)	Executive chair car (EC)	AC Chair car (CC)	Sleeper class (SL)	Second seating (2S)	General or Unreserved
	Loco and other service coach													
	AC coach													
	Non-AC coach													

Coach position of 12129 [PUNE-HWH]

Loco	1	2	3	4	5	6	7	8	9	10	11	12	13	14	15	16	17	18	19	20	21	22
	SLR	GEN	GEN	S1	S2	S3	S4	S5	S6	S7	PC	B1	B2	B3	B4	B5	B6	A1	A2	GEN	GEN	EOG

Coach position of 12130 [HWH-PUNE]

Loco	1	2	3	4	5	6	7	8	9	10	11	12	13	14	15	16	17	18	19	20	21	22
	EOG	GEN	GEN	A2	A1	B6	B5	B4	B3	B2	B1	PC	S7	S6	S5	S4	S3	S2	S1	GEN	GEN	SLR

Passengers are advised to check coach position indicator at station before boarding.

== See also ==
- Pune–Howrah Duronto Express
- Santragachi–Pune Humsafar Express
