= Santragachi–Pune Humsafar Express =

Santragachi - Pune Humsafar Express

Overview
- Service type: Humsafar Express
- First service: 11 August 2018; 7 years ago
- Current operator: South Eastern Railways

Route
- Termini: Santragachi (SRC); Pune (PUNE)
- Stops: 15
- Distance travelled: 2,058 km (1,279 mi)
- Average journey time: 32 hours 20 mins
- Service frequency: Weekly (Note: Runs twice in a week for every direction.)
- Train number: 20821 / 20822

On-board services
- Class: AC 3 tier
- Seating arrangements: No
- Sleeping arrangements: Yes
- Catering facilities: Available
- Observation facilities: Large windows
- Baggage facilities: Available

Technical
- Rolling stock: LHB Humsafar
- Track gauge: 1,676 mm (5 ft 6 in)
- Operating speed: 65 km/h (40 mph) Avg. Speed

The 20821/20822 Santragachi - Pune Humsafar Express is a Premium Humsafar Express train of the Indian Railways connecting Santragachi in Howrah near Kolkata in West Bengal and Pune in Maharashtra . It is currently being operated with 20821/20822 train numbers on a weekly basis.

== Loco link ==
This route is fully electrified and runs from end to end with Santragachi based WAP 7 locomotive.

== Coach composition ==
The trains is completely 3-tier AC sleeper trains designed by Indian Railways with features of LED screen display to show information about stations, train speed etc. and will have announcement system as well, Vending machines for tea, coffee and milk, Bio toilets in compartments as well as CCTV cameras.

== Service ==
It averages 65 km/h as 20821 Humsafar Express (PUNE-SRC) starts on Monday and covering 2058 km in 32 hrs 20 mins & 65 km/h as 20822 Humsafar Express (SRC-PUNE) starts on Saturday covering 2058 km in 32 hours 50 mins.

== Stoppage ==
1. Santragachi
2. Kharagpur Junction
3. Tatanagar Junction
4. Chakradharpur
5. Rourkela
6. Jharsuguda
7. Bilaspur Junction
8. Raipur Junction
9. Durg
10. Gondia Junction
11. Nagpur Junction
12. Bhusaval Junction
13. Kalyan Junction
14. Panvel
15. Pune Junction

== Rake sharing ==
The train shares its rake with 20827/20828 Jabalpur-Santragachi Humsafar Express.

== See also ==
- Humsafar Express
- Santragachi railway station
- Pune railway station
