= Mahali Marup railway station =

Railway Station in Jharkhand

Mahali Marup Railway Station

General information
- Location: Mahali Marup Seraikela Kharsawan district, Jharkhand; India
- Coordinates: 22.7550295°N 85.8703752°E
- Elevation: 182 m (597 ft)
- System: Passenger train station
- Owner: Indian Railways
- Operator: South Eastern Railway
- Line: Howrah–Nagpur–Mumbai line
- Platforms: 3

Construction
- Structure type: Standard (on ground station)

Other information
- Status: Functioning
- Station code: MMV
- Zone(s): South Eastern Railway zone
- Division(s): Chakradharpur railway division

History
- Former names: Bengal Nagpur Railway
Location
- Location within India Location within Jharkhand

Mahali Marup Railway Station is a railway station on Howrah–Nagpur–Mumbai line under Chakradharpur railway division of South Eastern Railway zone. It is situated at Mahali Marup, Seraikela Kharsawan district in the Indian state of Jharkhand. It is 34 km (21 mi) from Tatanagar Junction.
