= Barabambo railway station =

Railway Station in Jharkhand

Barabambo Railway Station

General information
- Location: Barabambo–Rajkharsawan Road, West Singhbhum district, Jharkhand; India
- Coordinates: 22.7013085°N 85.7283031°E
- Elevation: 213 m (699 ft)
- System: Passenger train station
- Owner: Indian Railways
- Operator: South Eastern Railway
- Line: Howrah–Nagpur–Mumbai line
- Platforms: 2

Construction
- Structure type: Standard (on-ground station)

Other information
- Status: Functioning
- Station code: BRM
- Zone(s): South Eastern Railway zone
- Division(s): Chakradharpur

History
- Former names: Bengal Nagpur Railway
Location
- Location within India Location within Jharkhand

Barabambo Railway Station is a railway station on Howrah–Nagpur–Mumbai line under Chakradharpur railway division of South Eastern Railway zone. It is situated at Barabambo, West Singhbhum district in the Indian state of Jharkhand. It is 10 km (6 mi) from Chakradharpur railway station.
