= Kokpara =

- Village
- Location in Jharkhand, India Kokpara (India)
- Coordinates: 22.466667°N 86.5864°E
- Country: India
- State: Jharkhand
- District: East Singhbhum
- Elevation: 92 m (302 ft)

Population
  - Total: 3,286

Languages*
  - Official: Hindi, Urdu
- Time zone: UTC+5:30 (IST)
- Telephone/ STD code: 0657
- Vehicle registration: JH 05
- Literacy: 66.27%
- Lok Sabha constituency: Jamshedpur
- Vidhan Sabha constituency: Ghatsila
- Website: jamshedpur.nic.in

Kokpara is a village in the Dhalbhumgarh CD block in the Ghatshila subdivision of the East Singhbhum district, Jharkhand, India.

== Geography ==
Cities, towns and locations in East Singhbhum district in Kolhan Division (Locations around Jamshedpur are shown in the Jamshedpur Urban Agglomeration map - see Bagbera Colony page)
M: municipality, R: rural/ urban centre, CT: census town, T: tourist centre
Owing to space constraints in the small map, the actual locations in a larger map may vary slightly

=== Location ===
It is located at 22.466667°N 86.5864°E at an elevation of 92 m from MSL.

=== Area overview ===
The area shown in the map “forms a part of the Chota Nagpur Plateau and is a hilly upland tract”. The main rivers draining the district are the Subarnarekha and the Kharkai. The area lying between Jamshedpur and Ghatshila is the main industrial mining zone. The rest of the district is primarily agricultural. In the district, as of 2011, 56.9% of the population lives in the rural areas and a high 43.1% lives in the urban areas.

Note: The map alongside presents some of the notable locations in the district. All places marked in the map are linked in the larger full screen map.

== Demographics ==
According to the 2011 Census of India, Kokpara had a total population of 3,286, of which 1,630 (50%) were males and 1,656 (50%) were females. Population in the age range 0–6 years was 396. The total number of literate persons in Kokpara was 1,916 (66.27% of the population over 6 years).

(*For language details see Dhalbhumgarh block#Language and religion)

== Transport ==
National Highway 18 (old number NH 33) passes through Kokpara. The nearest airport is Ranchi Airport and the nearest railway station is at Tatanagar. Jamshedpur is 80 km from Kokpara.
