= McCluskieganj =

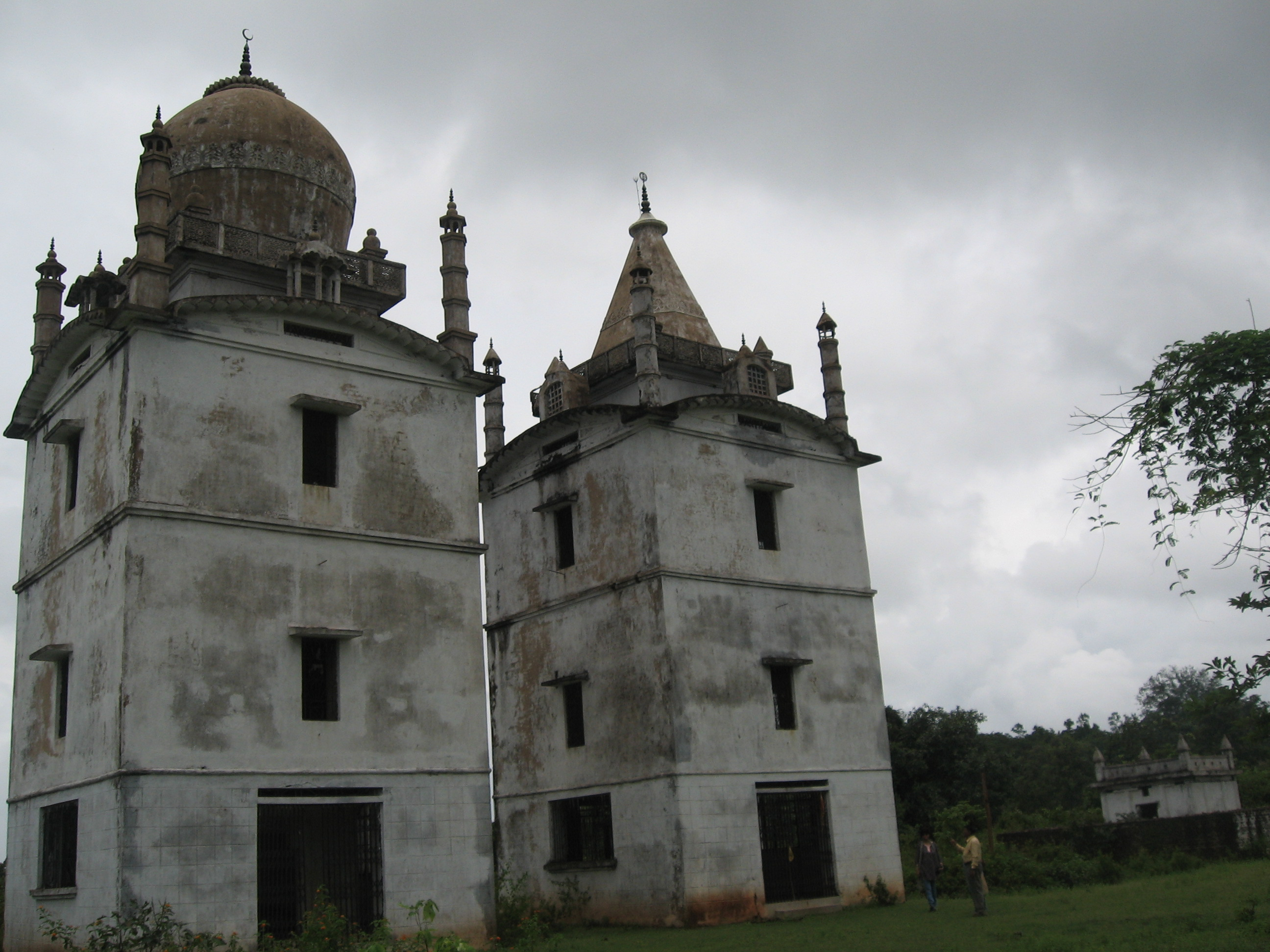
- Nickname: Mini England
- Location in Jharkhand, India McCluskieganj (India)
- Coordinates: 23.64°N 84.94°E
- Country: India
- State: Jharkhand
- District: Ranchi district
- Block: Khalari
- Established: 1933
- Founder: Ernest Timothy McCluskie
- Elevation: 450 m (1,480 ft)

Population
  - Total: 3,000

Languages
  - Official: Nagpuri, Hindi
- Time zone: UTC+5:30 (IST)
- PIN: 829208
- Vehicle registration: JH

McCluskieganj is a small hilly town in Jharkhand State, India, about 40 miles (64 km) northwest of the capital, Ranchi. The town used to have a significant Anglo-Indian community. It is now a tourist place for its British era old mansions, hills and streams.

== History ==
Ernest Timothy McCluskie, the Anglo Indian businessman from Kolkata visited the place and was impressed by the environment and climate of the area. He decided to build a town for Anglo Indian and purchased the lands from king of Chotanagpur, Udai Pratap Nath Shah Deo. In 1932, he sent circulars to nearly 200,000 Anglo-Indians in India inviting them to settle there. It was founded by the Colonization Society of India in 1933 as a homeland or "Mooluk" for Anglo-Indians. Anglo-Indians could buy Shares in this co-operative, the Colonization Society of India - which in turn would allot them a plot of land. It became home to 400 Anglo-Indian families within ten years. Of the nearly 300 original settlers, only 20 families remain, as most of the Anglo-Indian community left after World War II.

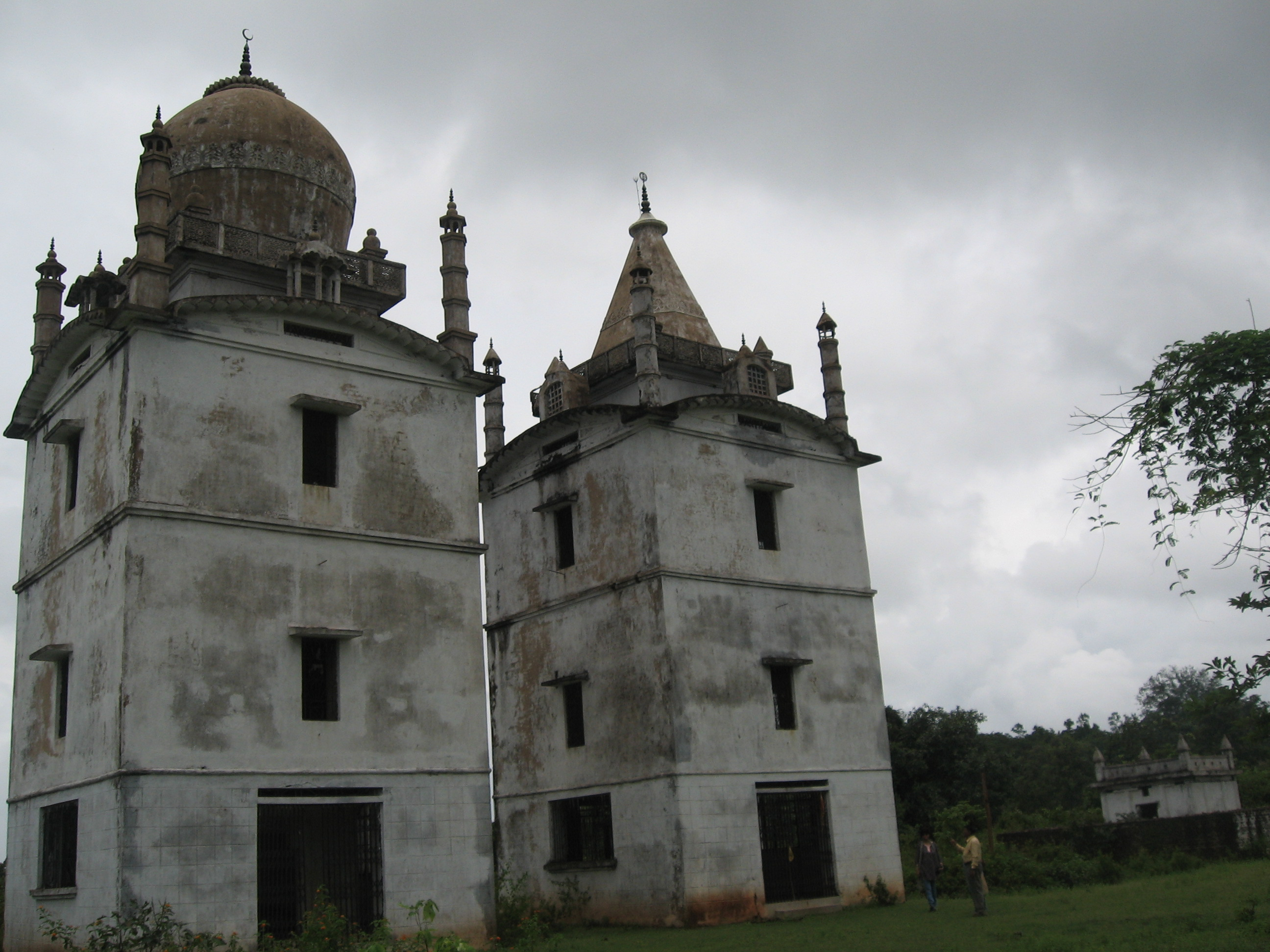
A mosque, a temple & a gurudwara at one place

Now, the population of the town is around 3000.

== Geography ==
McCluskieganj is located at the distance of around 60 km North West from state capital of Jharkhand, Ranchi in Khelari block. It is located at altitude of 450 meter. It is located near the Dugadugi river which is a tributary of Damodar River. Jhunjhunia waterfall located near Macluskieganj.

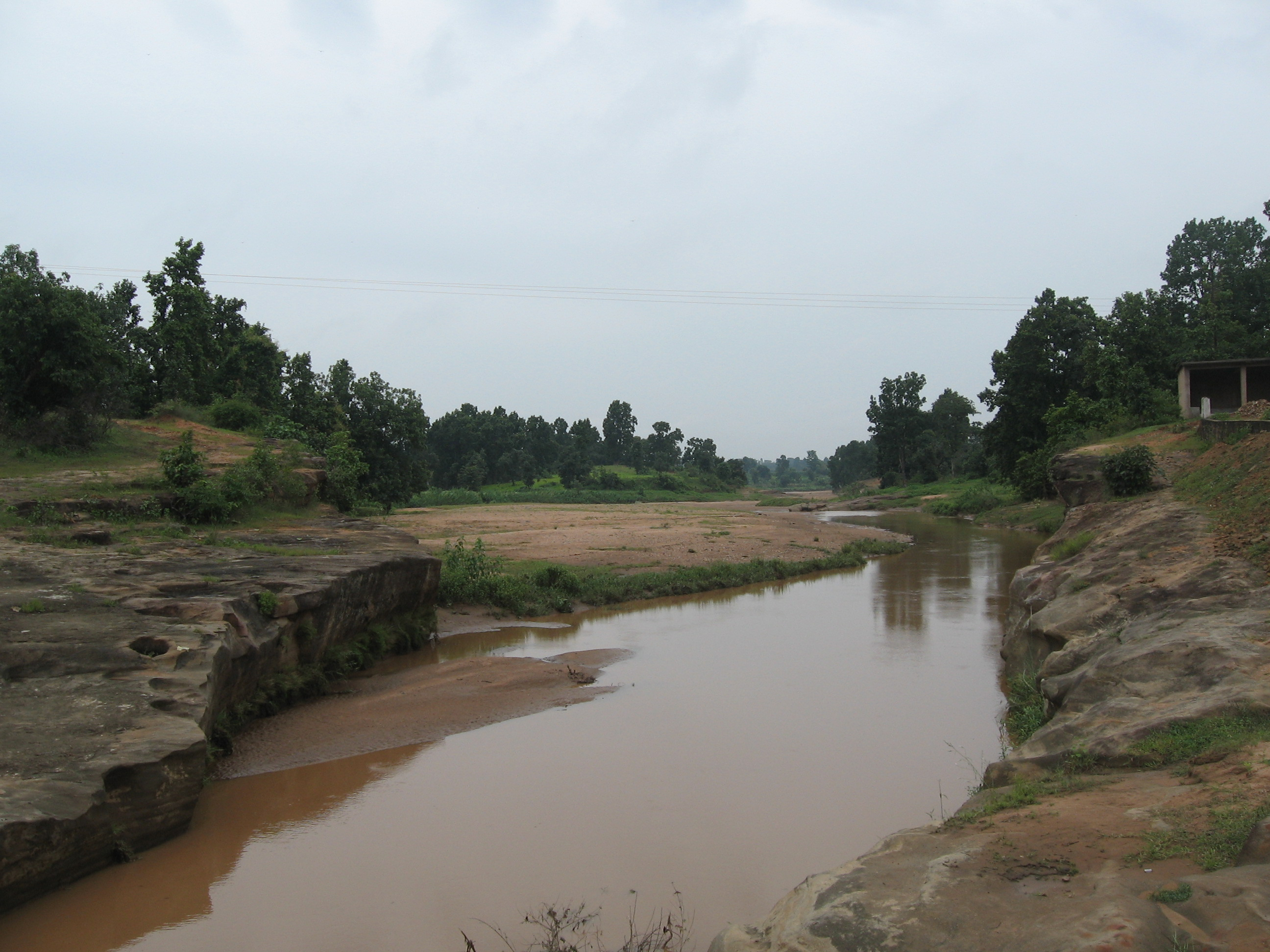
Dugadugi river

=== Climate ===
The climate of McCluskieganj is ideal with low humidity. McCluskieganj witnesses frost during winter which cover grass, vehicles and roofs. During cold wave, It records temperature around freezing points. In 2013, it recorded 1.5 °C in month of January.

== Infrastructure ==
=== Educational institution ===
- Adarsh High school, since 1985.
- Don Bosco Academy, since 1997.
- Saraswati Shishu Vidya Mandir, McCluskieganj, primary school since 1998.
- St. Teresa's Primary School.
- Janet Academy.
- Delhi Public International School.
- McCluskieganj Inter college, since 2012.

== Transport ==
National Highway 39 (Ranchi-Daltonganj), an important roadway in the Ranchi district, passes near McCluskieganj. McCluskieganj railway station is located in McCluskieganj.

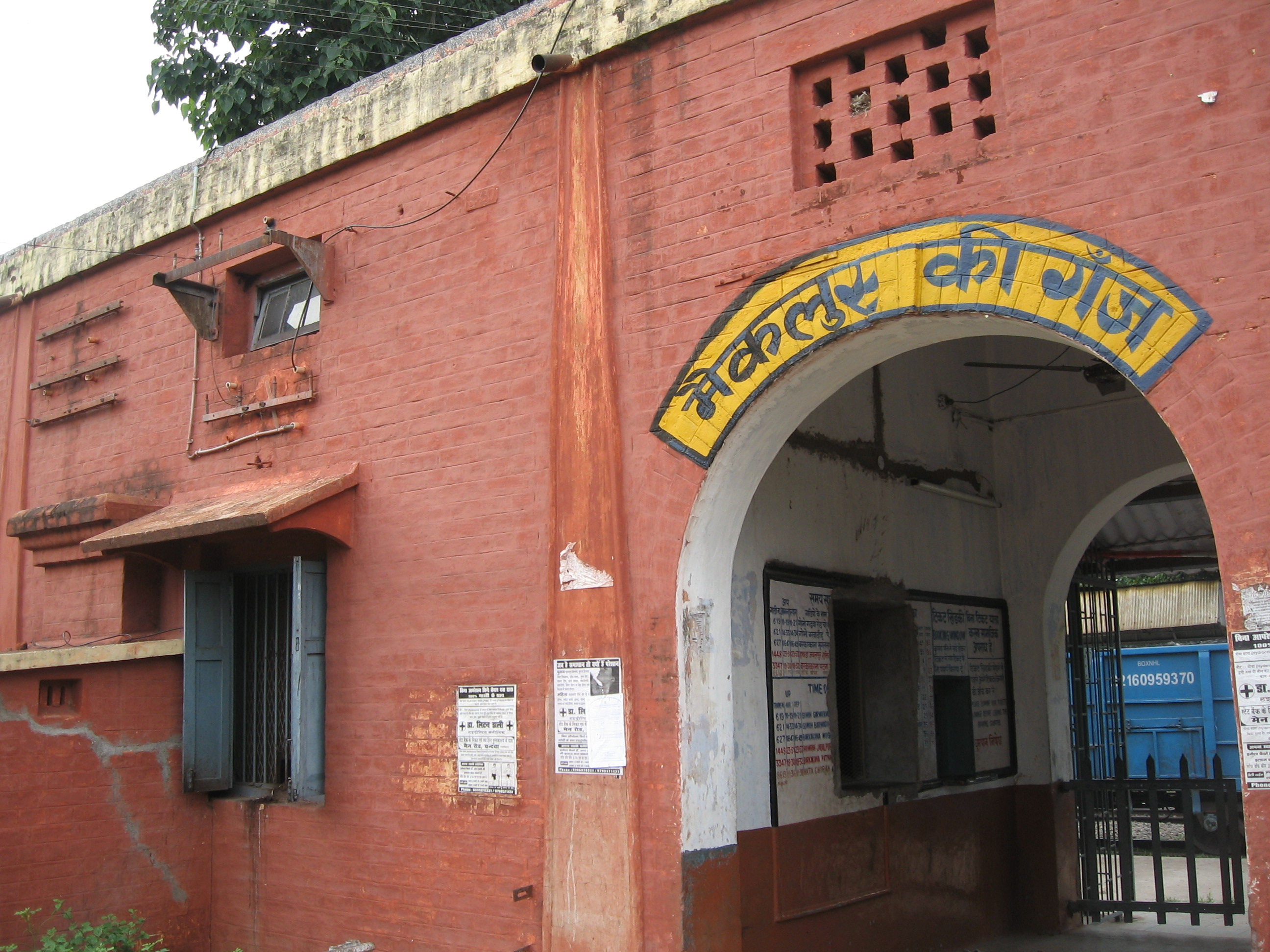
McCluskieganj railway station

== Attractions ==
- McCluskeiganj Gurudwara and Temple: lying in the same complex is a place of integrity and shows the brotherhood of India.
- McCluskeiganj Mosque: It is beside the Gurudwara and Temple complex.
- St. John's Church: A historical place built by Anglo-Indians during British rule.
- Nakta Hill: Peak for trekking and to get a 360 degree panoramic view of the city.

== In popular culture ==
The town was the inspiration for the Hindi novel Maikluskiganj (मैकलुस्कीगंज) by journalist-writer Vikas Kumar Jha, which was translated into English by Mahasweta Ghosh in 2005. The inspiration was liked by audience.

The 1967 Bengali film Chhuti was set in and around McCluskieganj.

McCluskieganj is also the setting for the 2016 film A Death in the Gunj, which is Konkona Sen Sharma's directorial debut, and set in 1979.
