= Murli Halt railway station =

Railway station in Jharkhand

Murli Halt

General information
- Location: Tin Pahar-Rajmahal Road, Mahadevpur, Sahebganj district, Jharkhand; India
- Coordinates: 25°01′02″N 87°46′24″E
- Elevation: 33 m (108 ft)
- System: Passenger train station
- Owner: Indian Railways
- Operator: Eastern Railway zone
- Line: Sahibganj loop line
- Platforms: 1
- Tracks: 1

Construction
- Structure type: Standard (on ground station)

Other information
- Status: Active
- Station code: MRLI
- Zone(s): Eastern Railway zone
- Division(s): Malda

History
- Former names: East Indian Railway Company
Location

Murli Halt railway station is a halt railway station on the branch of Sahibganj loop line under the Malda railway division of Eastern Railway zone. It is situated beside Tin Pahar-Rajmahal Road at Mahadevpur in Sahebganj district in the Indian state of Jharkhand.

Preceding station	Indian Railways	Following station
Tinpahar Junction towards ?	Eastern Railway zone Rajmahal branch line	Rajmahal towards ?
