= Galudih =

- Village
- Location in Jharkhand, India Galudih (India)
- Coordinates: 22.6464°N 86.4045°E
- Country: India
- State: Jharkhand
- District: East Singhbhum

Population
  - Total: 311

Languages*
  - Official: Hindi, Urdu
- Time zone: UTC+5:30 (IST)
- PIN: 833101
- Telephone/STD code: 0657
- Vehicle registration: JH 05
- Literacy: 59.62%
- Lok Sabha constituency: Jamshedpur
- Vidhan Sabha constituency: Ghatsila
- Website: jamshedpur.nic.in

Galudih is a village in the Ghatshila CD block in the Ghatshila subdivision of the East Singhbhum district, Jharkhand, India.

== Civic administration ==
There is a police station at Galudih.

== Demographics ==
According to the 2011 Census of India, Galudi had a total population of 311, of which 163 (52%) were males and 148 (48%) were females. Population in the age range 0–6 years was 46. The total number of literate persons in Galudi was 158 (59.62% of the population over 6 years).

== Geography ==
Cities, towns and locations in East Singhbhum district in Kolhan Division (Locations around Jamshedpur are shown in the Jamshedpur Urban Agglomeration map - see Bagbera Colony page)
M: municipality, R: rural/ urban centre, CT: census town, T: tourist centre
Owing to space constraints in the small map, the actual locations in a larger map may vary slightly

=== Location ===
Galudih is located at 22.6464°N 86.4045°E.

=== Galudih Barrage ===
The 436.2 m (1,431 ft) Galudih barrage across the Subarnarekha is a part of the Subarnarekha Multipurpose Project, which is a joint venture of the states of Bihar (later Jharkhand), West Bengal and Odisha. The barrage diverts water into canals on both sides of the river. Chandil Dam is also a part of this project. Burudi Lake is about 4 km away.

=== Area overview ===
The area shown in the map "forms a part of the Chota Nagpur Plateau and is a hilly upland tract". The main rivers draining the district are the Subarnarekha and the Kharkai. The area lying between Jamshedpur and Ghatshila is the main industrial mining zone. The rest of the district is primarily agricultural. In the district, as of 2011, 56.9% of the population lives in the rural areas and a high 43.1% lives in the urban areas.

Note: The map alongside presents some of the notable locations in the district. All places marked in the map are linked in the larger full screen map.

== Transport ==
Galudih railway station is on the Kharagpur-Tatanagar line.
