= Nakta Hill =

Nakta hills
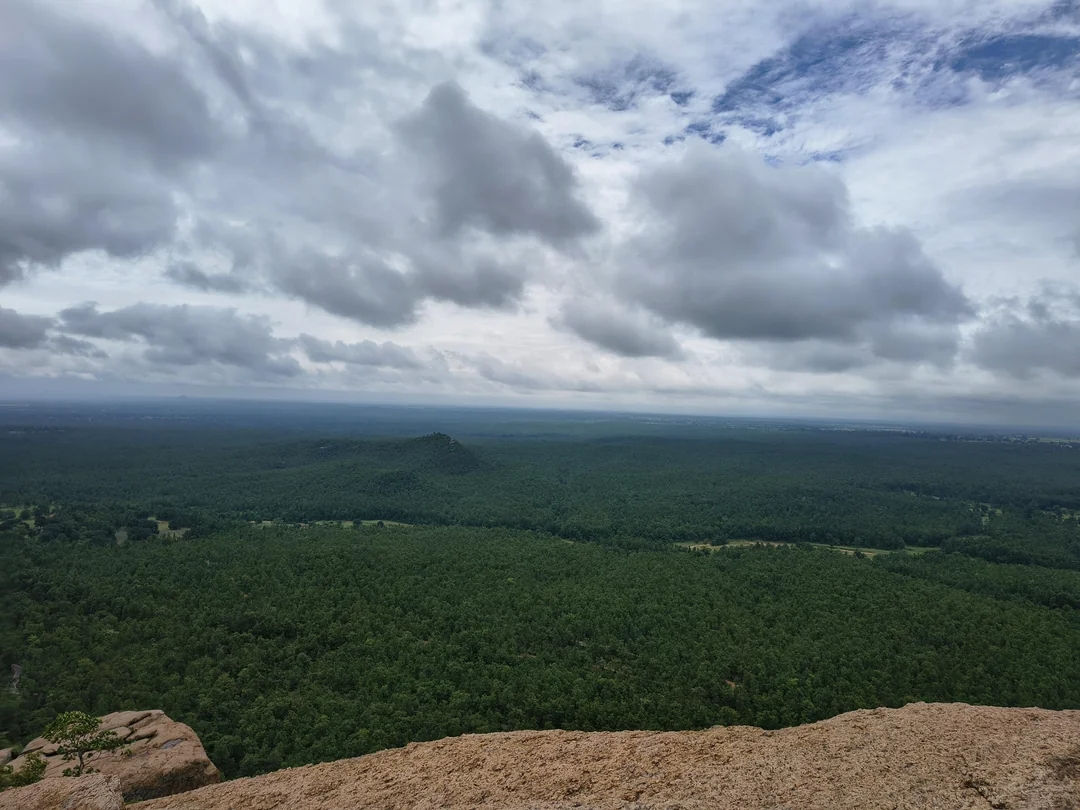
- Panoramic view of the surrounding area from the top of the hill

Highest point
- Elevation: 450 m (1,480 ft)
- Coordinates: 23°34′27″N 84°57′41″E

Geography
- Location within Jharkhand
- Location: McCluskieganj
- Country: India
- State: Jharkhand
- District: Ranchi
- Parent range: Chota Nagpur Plateau

Nakta Hill (Hindi: नकटा पहाड़) is a distinctive hill located near McCluskieganj in Ranchi district of the Indian state of Jharkhand. The hill is situated approximately 60 kilometres from Jharkhand's capital, Ranchi and forms part of the broader Chota Nagpur Plateau. Characterised by prominent rock formations, dense surrounding forests and elevated terrain, Nakta Hill offers wide panoramic 360-degree bird's-eye views of the surrounding landscape and is considered suitable for trekking and hiking. The hill's elevation is about 450 metres.

== See also ==
- Parasnath Hill
- Trikut Hill
