= Pune–Howrah Duronto Express =

Pune Junction - Howrah Junction AC Duronto Express
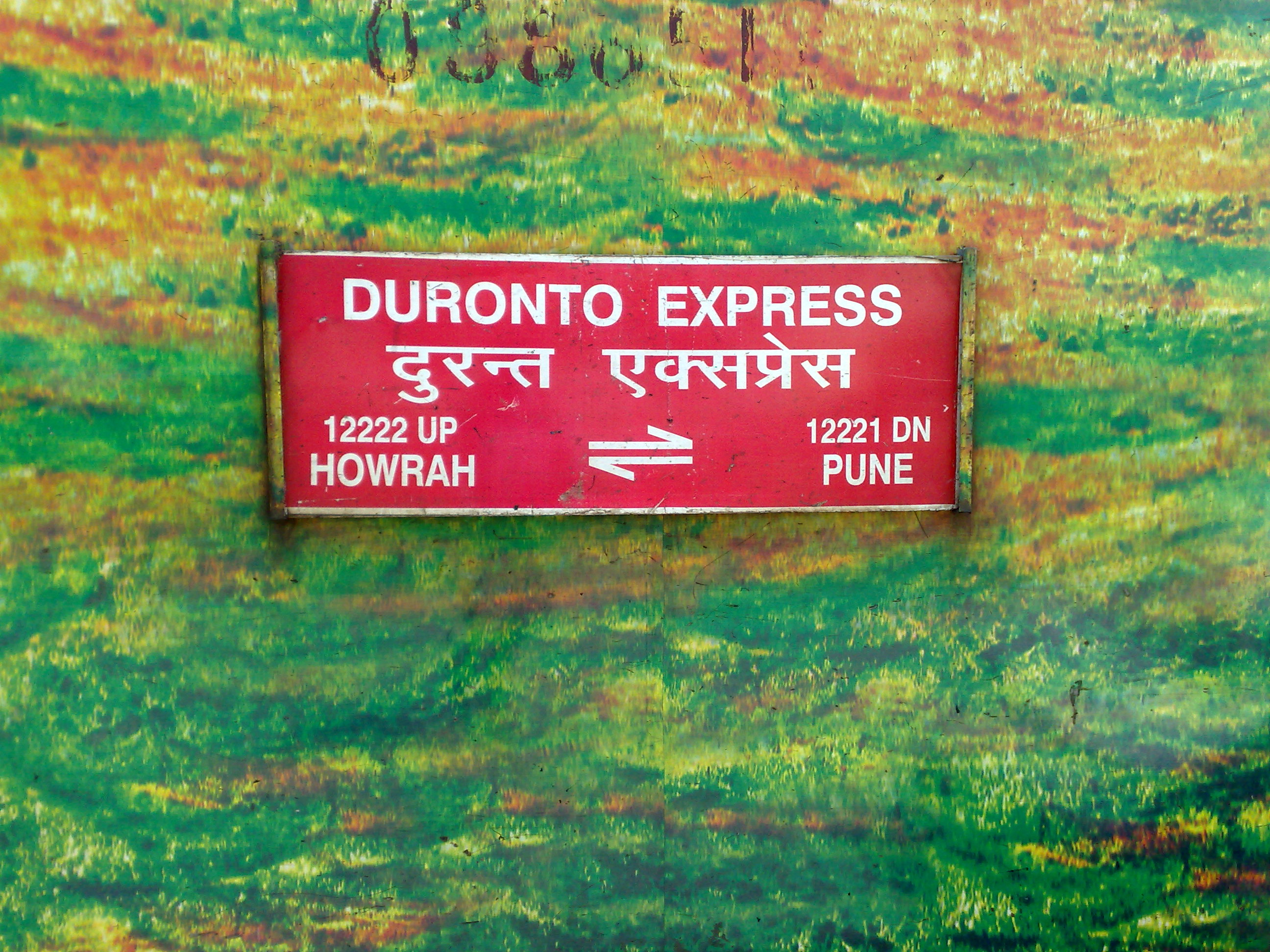

Overview
- Service type: Duronto Express
- First service: 9 October 2010
- Current operator: South Eastern Railway

Route
- Termini: Pune Junction; Howrah Junction
- Stops: 6
- Distance travelled: 2,020 km (1,260 mi)
- Average journey time: 28 hours, 35 minutes as 12221 Pune Howrah Duronto Express, 27 hours, 25 minutes as 12222 Howrah Pune Duronto Express
- Service frequency: 2 days a week. 12221 – Monday & Saturday, 12222 – Thursday & Saturday
- Train number: 12221, 12222

On-board services
- Classes: AC 1st Class, AC 2 tier, AC 3 tier
- Sleeping arrangements: Yes
- Catering facilities: Yes, Pantry car attached
- Observation facilities: Rake sharing with 12261/62 Howrah Mumbai CST Duronto Express

Technical
- Rolling stock: LHB coach
- Track gauge: Broad - 1,676 mm (5 ft 6 in)
- Operating speed: 140 km/h (87 mph) Maximum, 72.17 km/h (45 mph) (Average Speed), including halts

The Pune - Howrah Duronto Express is a Duronto Category Superfast Express train of the Indian Railways connecting Pune to Howrah.

It is one of three Duronto's operating out of Pune with the other two being 12263/64 Hazrat Nizamuddin Pune Duronto Express & 12297/98 Pune Ahmedabad Duronto Express.

== Coach composition ==
The rake has 1 AC 1st Class, 3 AC 2 tier, 10 AC 3 tier, 1 Pantry Car and 2 End on Generator coaches.

As with most train services in India, Coach Composition may be amended at the discretion of Indian Railways depending on demand.

== Service ==
It is the fastest train on the Pune – Howrah sector averaging over 5 hours faster than the only other train which does the Pune – Howrah sector 12129/30 Azad Hind Express.

It averages 70.67 km/h (44 mph) as 12221 Pune Howrah Duronto Express covering 2,020 km (1,260 mi) in 28 hrs 35 mins & 73.68 km/h (46 mph) as 12222 Howrah Pune Duronto Express covering the same distance in 27 hrs 25 mins.

== Train details ==
This train had its inaugural run on 9 October 2010. It is a fully AC train & uses LHB coach.

== Loco link ==
It is hauled by a Bhusaval-based WAP 4 or Howrah based WAP-7 from Pune Junction to Howrah Junction.

== Time table ==
Station Code	Station Name	Arrival	Departure
PUNE	Pune Junction	---	15:15
DDCC	Daund Chord Line	16:23	16:25
MMR	Manmad Junction	20:17	20:20
BL	Bhusawal Junction	22:40	22:45
AK	Akola Junction	00:38	00:40
NGP	Nagpur Junction	04:10	04:15
R	Raipur Junction	08:22	08:24
BSP	Bilaspur Junction	09:55	10:05
TATA	Tatanagar Junction	16:15	16:25
HWH	Howrah Junction	20:05	---

== See also ==
- Duronto Express
- Pune Junction
- Howrah Junction
- Azad Hind Express
- Dedicated Intercity trains of India
