= McCluskieganj railway station =

Railway station in Jharkhand, India

McCluskieganj

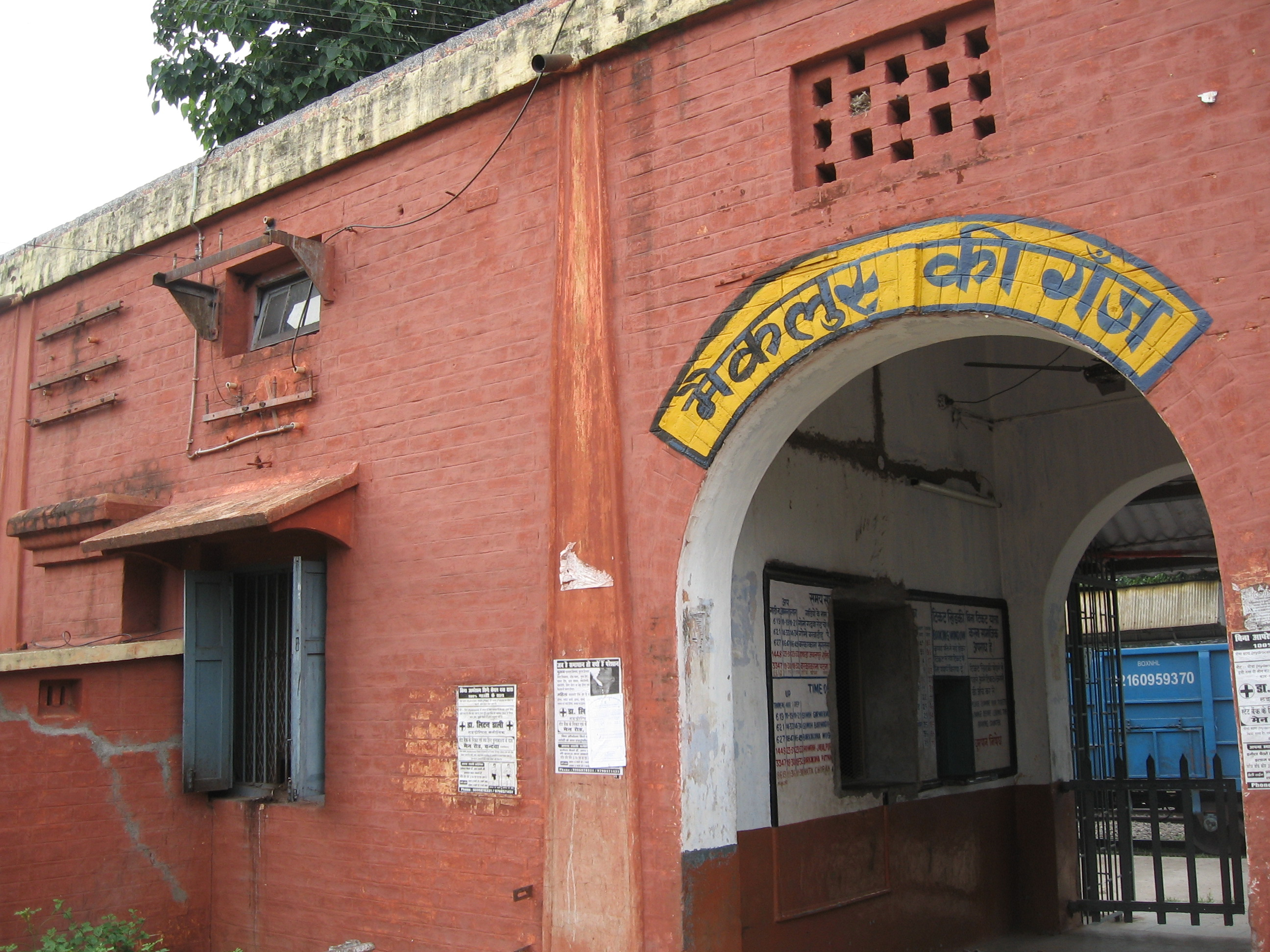
- McCluskieganj railway station entry gate

General information
- Location: McCluskieganj, Ranchi district, Jharkhand; India
- Coordinates: 23°39′07″N 84°56′29″E
- Elevation: 471.00 metres (1,545.28 ft)
- System: Indian Railways station
- Owner: East Central Railway
- Operator: Indian Railways
- Line: Barkakana-Son Nagar line
- Platforms: 3
- Tracks: Broad gauge

Construction
- Structure type: At-grade
- Parking: Available

Other information
- Status: Active
- Station code: MGME
- Zone(s): East Central Railway
- Division(s): Dhanbad
- Classification: NSG‑6

History
- Electrified: Double electrified 1992
- Former names: East Indian Railway
Route map
Location
- Location within Jharkhand Location within India
- Interactive map

McCluskieganj railway station (station code: MGME) is a railway station serving the town of McCluskieganj in Ranchi district in the Indian state of Jharkhand. It is part of the East Central Railway zone of Indian Railways and lies on the Barkakana-Son Nagar section, providing regional rail connectivity to the surrounding areas. It caters to visitors traveling to McCluskieganj, a popular hill destination noted for its Anglo-Indian history, scenic surroundings and excellent climate.

== History ==
The railway station serves the town of McCluskieganj, which was established in the early 1930s by Ernest Timothy McCluskie as an Anglo-Indian settlement in the Chota Nagpur Plateau region. Planned as a self sustaining township, McCluskieganj developed around its colonial character and natural surroundings. Rail connectivity along the Barkakana loop line facilitated access to the town, supporting its settlement and integration with nearby regions and the wider railway network of present day Jharkhand.

== Infrastructure and facilities ==
McCluskieganj railway station has three platforms, a foot over bridge and basic passenger amenities. Both express and passenger trains have scheduled halts at the station, serving local commuters and tourists visiting the town.
