= Tin Pahar =

- Census Town
- Location in Jharkhand, India Tin Pahar (India)
- Coordinates: 25.000233°N 87.740778°E
- Country: India
- State: Jharkhand
- District: Sahibganj

Area
  - Total: 1 km^{2} (0.39 sq mi)

Population (2011)
  - Total: 5,336
  - Density: 5,300/km^{2} (14,000/sq mi)

Languages (*For language details see Sahibganj (community development block)#Language and religion)
  - Official: Hindi, Urdu
- Time zone: UTC+5:30 (IST)
- PIN: 816116
- Telephone/ STD code: 06426
- Lok Sabha constituency: Rajmahal
- Vidhan Sabha constituency: Rajmahal
- Website: sahibganj.nic.in

Tin Pahar is a census town in the Rajmahal CD block in the Sahibganj subdivision of the Sahibganj district in the Indian state of Jharkhand.

== Geography ==
Cities, towns and locations in the Sahibganj, Godda and Pakur districts in Santhal Pargana Division
M: municipality, CT: census town, R: rural/ urban centre, H: historical/ religious/ tourist centre
Owing to space constraints in the small map, the actual locations in a larger map may vary slightly

=== Location ===
Tin Pahar is located at 25.000233°N 87.740778°E.

Tin Pahar has an area of 1 square kilometre (0.39 sq mi).

=== Overview ===
The map shows a hilly area with the Rajmahal hills running from the bank of the Ganges in the extreme north to the south, beyond the area covered by the map into Dumka district. ‘Farakka’ is marked on the map and that is where Farakka Barrage is, just inside West Bengal. Rajmahal coalfield is shown in the map. The entire area is overwhelmingly rural with only small pockets of urbanisation.

Note: All places marked on the map are linked and it is possible to enlarge the map to see what else is there – one gets railway links, many more road links and so on.

== Demographics ==
According to the 2011 Census of India, Tin Pahar had a total population of 5,336, of which 2,789 (52%) were males and 2,547 (48%) were females. Population in the age range 0–6 years was 840. The total number of literate persons in Tin Pahar was 4,496 (78.94% of the population over 6 years).

== Infrastructure ==
According to the District Census Handbook 2011, Sahibganj, Tin Pahar covered an area of 1.00 km^{2}. Among the civic amenities, it had 8 km roads with open drains, the protected water supply involved hand pump, uncovered well. It had 735 domestic electric connections. Among the educational facilities it had 2 primary schools, 2 middle schools, 2 secondary schools, 2 senior secondary schools. Among the social, cultural and recreational facilities, it had 1 auditorium/ community hall. Two important commodities it produced were stone, cotton. It had the branch office of 1 nationalised bank.

== Transport ==
Tinpahar Junction railway station is situated at Tin Pahar on the Sahibganj loop.

== Education ==
- Government Urdu Girls High School, an Urdu medium girls only institution established in 1929.
- Government High School, a Hindi-medium coeducational institution established in 1967.
- Tin Pahar Inter College is a Hindi-medium coeducational institution established in 1985.
