= Tinpahar Junction railway station =

Railway station in Jharkhand

Tinpahar Junction

General information
- Location: Tin Pahar, Sahebganj district, Jharkhand; India
- Coordinates: 24°59′49″N 87°44′38″E
- Elevation: 38 m (125 ft)
- System: Passenger train station
- Owner: Indian Railways
- Operator: Eastern Railway zone
- Line: Rampurhat-Sahibganj Section
- Platforms: 4
- Tracks: 2

Construction
- Structure type: Standard (on ground station)

Other information
- Status: Active
- Station code: TPH
- Zone(s): Eastern Railway zone
- Division(s): Malda

History
- Former names: East Indian Railway Company
Location

Tinpahar Junction railway station is a railway station on the Rampurhat-Sahibganj section under the Malda railway division of Eastern Railway zone. It is situated at Tin Pahar in Sahebganj district in the Indian state of Jharkhand.

Preceding station	Indian Railways	Following station
Dhamdhamia towards Khana	Eastern Railway zone Sahibganj loop	Kalian Chak towards Kiul Junction
Terminus	Eastern Railway zone Rajmahal branch line	Murli Halt towards ?
