= Dhamdhamia railway station =

Railway station in Jharkhand

Dhamdhamia

General information
- Location: Kathalbari, Dhamdhamia, Sahebganj district, Jharkhand; India
- Coordinates: 24°57′37″N 87°45′42″E
- Elevation: 37 m (121 ft)
- System: Passenger train station
- Owner: Indian Railways
- Operator: Eastern Railway zone
- Line: Rampurhat-Sahibganj Section
- Platforms: 2
- Tracks: 2

Construction
- Structure type: Standard (on ground station)

Other information
- Status: Active
- Station code: DDX
- Zone(s): Eastern Railway zone
- Division(s): Malda

History
- Former names: East Indian Railway Company

Services
Preceding station	Indian Railways	Following station
Bakudi towards Khana	Eastern Railway zone Sahibganj loop	Tinpahar Junction towards Kiul Junction
Location

Dhamdhamia railway station is a railway station on the Rampurhat-Sahibganj section under the Malda railway division of Eastern Railway zone. The station is situated at Kathalbari, Dhamdhamia in Sahebganj district in the Indian state of Jharkhand.
