= Rakha Mines railway station =

Railway Station in Jharkhand

Rakha Mines Railway Station
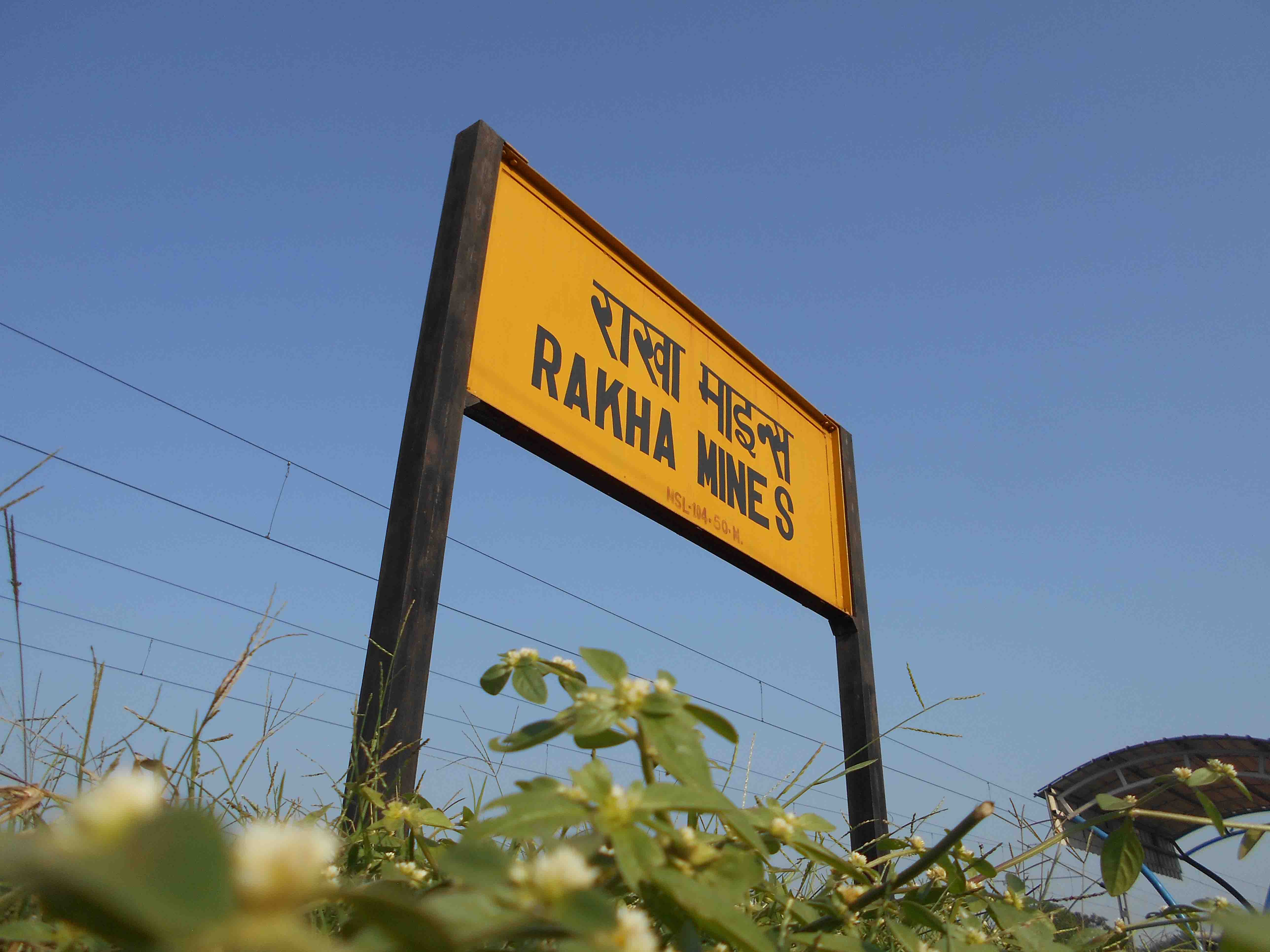

General information
- Location: Kuldiha, East Singhbhum district, Jharkhand; India
- Coordinates: 22.674535°N 86.354183°E
- Elevation: 118 m (387 ft)
- System: Passenger train station
- Owner: Indian Railways
- Operator: South Eastern Railways
- Line: Howrah–Nagpur–Mumbai line
- Platforms: 2
- Tracks: 4

Construction
- Structure type: Standard (on ground station)
- Parking: Yes

Other information
- Status: Functioning
- Station code: RHE
- Zone(s): South Eastern Railway zone
- Division(s): Kharagpur

History
- Former names: Bengal Nagpur Railway
Location
- Location within Jharkhand Location within India

Rakha Mines Railway Station (station code: RHE) is a railway station on Howrah–Nagpur–Mumbai line under Kharagpur railway division of South Eastern Railway zone. It is situated at Rakha Mines, Kuldiha in East Singhbhum district in the Indian state of Jharkhand. It is 19 km (12 mi) from Tatanagar Junction.
