= Sini, Jharkhand =

Sini
- Census Town
- Railway station of Sini.

- Location in Jharkhand, India Sini (India)
- Coordinates: 22.8021°N 85.9453°E
- Country: India
- State: Jharkhand
- District: Seraikela Kharsawan

Government
  - Type: Federal democracy

Area
  - Total: 2.02 km^{2} (0.78 sq mi)
- Elevation: 183 m (600 ft)

Population (2011)
  - Total: 6,382
  - Density: 3,160/km^{2} (8,180/sq mi)

Languages*
  - Official: Hindi, Urdu
- Time zone: UTC+5:30 (IST)
- PIN: 833219
- Telephone code: 06597
- Vehicle registration: JH-22
- Literacy: 84.52%
- Lok Sabha constituency: Singhbhum
- Vidhan Sabha constituency: Seraikella
- Website: seraikela.nic.in

Sini is a census town in the Seraikela CD block in the Seraikela Sadar subdivision of the Seraikella- Kharshwan district in the Indian state of Jharkhand.

== Geography ==
Cities, towns and locations in Seraikela Kharsawan district in Kolhan Division
M: municipality, R: rural/ urban centre, CT: census town, T: tourist centre
Owing to space constraints in the small map, the actual locations in a larger map may vary slightly

=== Location ===
Sini is located at 22.8°N 85.97°E. It has an average elevation of 183 metres (600 feet). The main source of livelihood for the common people is the Railway Workshop situated near the Sini Railway Station. There is also one Zonal Railway Training Institute (Z.R.T.I.) of Indian Railways situated at Sini. Sini is also blessed to have a very old cricket ground, popular as "Shershah Ground" (South Eastern Railway Sports Association or S.E.R.S.A.) where many inter division level competitions are held on a regular basis.

=== Area overview ===
The area shown in the map has been described as “part of the southern fringe of the Chotanagpur plateau and is a hilly upland tract”. 75.7% of the population lives in the rural areas and 24.3% lives in the urban areas.

Note: The map alongside presents some of the notable locations in the district. All places marked in the map are linked in the larger full screen map.

== Demographics ==
According to the 2011 Census of India, Sini had a total population of 6,382, of which 3,340 (52%) were males and 3,042 (48%) were females. Population in the age range 0-6 years was 724. The total number of literate persons in Sini was 4,782 (84.52% of the population over 6 years).

(*For language details see Seraikela block#Language and religion)

As of 2001 India census, Sini had a population of 6,489. Males constitute 53% of the population and females 47%. Sini has an average literacy rate of 72%, higher than the national average of 59.5%: male literacy is 80%, and female literacy is 63%. In Sini, 12% of the population is under 6 years of age.

== Infrastructure ==
According to the District Census Handbook 2011, Seraikela Kharsawan, Sini covered an area of 2.02 km^{2} (0.78 sq mi). It has an annual rainfall of 1,132.9 mm (44.60 in). Among the civic amenities, it had seven km (4.3 mi) of roads with both closed and open drains. The protected water supply involved tap water from treated sources, uncovered well, overhead tank. It had 1,292 domestic electric connections, 8 road lighting points. Among the medical facilities, it had 1 hospital, 2 dispensaries, 2 health centres, 1 family welfare centre, 5 maternity and child welfare centres, 6 maternity homes, 7 nursing homes, 10 veterinary hospitals, 2 medicine shops. Among the educational facilities it had 5 primary schools, 2 middle schools, 2 secondary schools, 1 senior secondary school, the nearest general degree college at Seraikela seven km (4.3 mi) away. Among social, cultural and recreational facilities, it had 1 auditorium/ community hall. An important commodity it produced was white stone. It had the branch offices of 1 nationalised bank, 1 co-operative banks.

== Transport ==
Sini is a station on the Tatanagar–Bilaspur section of Howrah-Nagpur-Mumbai line.

== Education ==
Versini High School is a Hindi-medium coeducational institution established in 1958. It has facilities for teaching from class IX to class XII. The school has a playground and a library with 1,855 books.

South Eastern Railway Inter College is a Hindi-medium coeducational institution. It has facilities for teaching in classes XI and XII. It has a playground, a library with 15,000 books, and has 5 computers for teaching and learning purposes.

== Culture ==
Noted filmmaker and writer Satyajit Ray has mentioned this place in his short story 'Ratan Babu ar Sei Lokta'.
