= Burudi =

- Village
- Burudi village

- Location in Jharkhand, India Burudi (India)
- Coordinates: 22.6427°N 86.4913°E
- Country: India
- State: Jharkhand
- District: East Singhbhum

Population
  - Total: 293

Languages*
  - Official: Hindi, Urdu
- Time zone: UTC+5:30 (IST)
- PIN: 833101
- Telephone/STD code: 0657
- Vehicle registration: JH 05
- Literacy: 72.80%
- Lok Sabha constituency: Jamshedpur
- Vidhan Sabha constituency: Ghatsila
- Website: jamshedpur.nic.in

Burudi is a village in the Ghatshila CD block in the Ghatshila subdivision of the East Singhbhum district, Jharkhand, India.

== Geography ==
Cities, towns and locations in East Singhbhum district in Kolhan Division (Locations around Jamshedpur are shown in the Jamshedpur Urban Agglomeration map - see Bagbera Colony page)
M: municipality, R: rural/ urban centre, CT: census town, T: tourist centre
Owing to space constraints in the small map, the actual locations in a larger map may vary slightly

=== Location ===
Burudi is located at 22.6427°N 86.4913°E.

Burudi Dam is 8.8 km (5.5 mi) from Ghatsila railway station, 50 km (31 mi) from Jamshedpur, and 244 km (152 mi) from Kolkata.

=== Burudi Dam ===
Burudi Dam was built in the scenic surroundings of Dalma Hills during the British Raj.

Binda Mela (fair), held for a fortnight in October, presents Santali handicrafts, paintings, jewellery, lamps, pots and other rural items.

Dharagiri Falls, about 20 ft (6.1 m) in height, and Phuldungri Hills, both popular tourist spots, are in the same direction as Burudi from Ghatshila.

=== Area overview ===
The area shown in the map "forms a part of the Chota Nagpur Plateau and is a hilly upland tract". The main rivers draining the district are the Subarnarekha and the Kharkai. The area lying between Jamshedpur and Ghatshila is the main industrial mining zone. The rest of the district is primarily agricultural. In the district, as of 2011, 56.9% of the population lives in the rural areas and a high 43.1% lives in the urban areas.

Note: The map alongside presents some of the notable locations in the district. All places marked in the map are linked in the larger full screen map.

== Demographics ==
According to the 2011 Census of India, Burudi had a total population of 293, of which 145 (49%) were males and 148 (51%) were females. Population in the age range 0–6 years was 43. The total number of literate persons in Burudi was 182 (72.80% of the population over 6 years).

(*For language details see Ghatshila block#Language and religion)

== Gallery ==
View of Burudi village

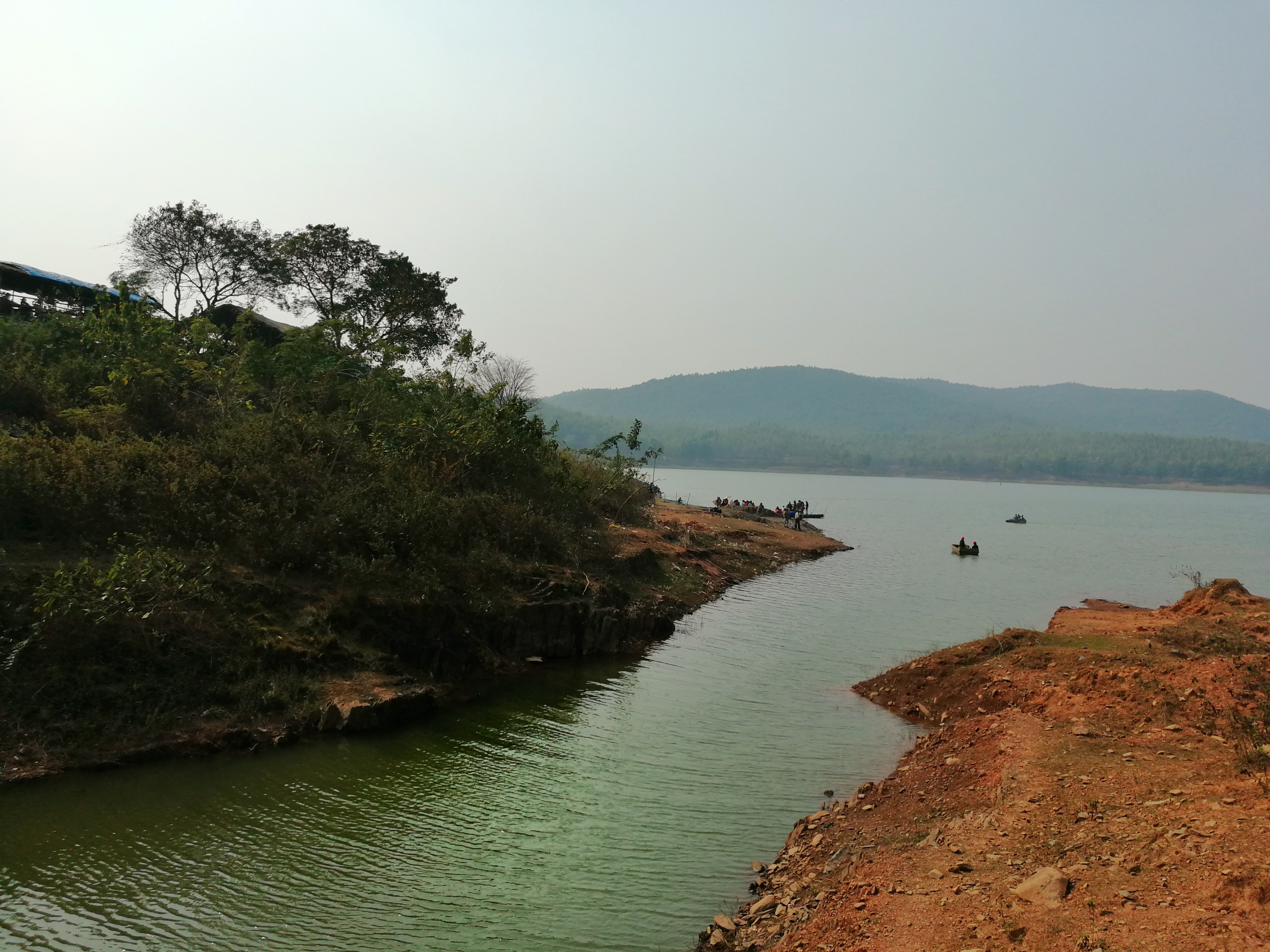
Burudih Lake

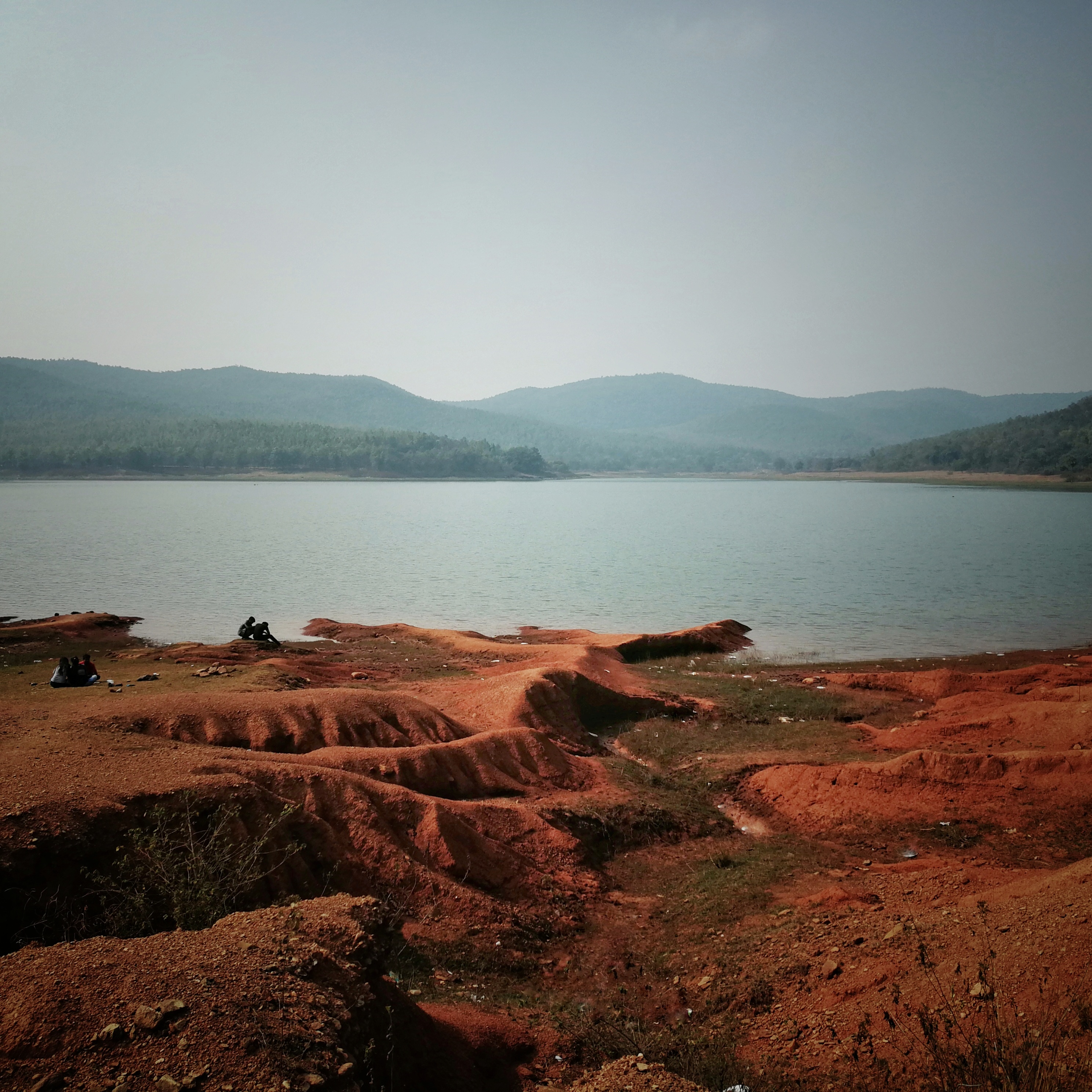
Burudih Lake

Burudi village

Burudi Dam
