= Child sex ratio in India =

2011 Census sex ratio map for the states and Union Territories of India Boys to Girls 0 to 1 age group

The child sex ratio in India is defined as the number of females per thousand males in the age group 0–6 years in a human population. Thus it is equal to 1000 x the reciprocal of the sex ratio (ratio of males to females in a population) in the same age group, i.e. under age seven. An imbalance in this age group will extend to older age groups in future years. Currently, the ratio of males to females is generally significantly greater than 1, i.e. there are more boys than girls.

According to the decennial Indian census, the sex ratio in the 0–6 age group in India went from 104.0 males per 100 females in 1981 to 105.8 in 1991, to 107.8 in 2001, to 108.8 in 2011. The ratio is significantly higher in certain states such as Punjab and Haryana (118 and 120 respectively per 2011 census). The child sex ratio has been more prominent for males in India for quite a while, since the 1980s with thirty fewer females to males

== Likelihood of an imbalanced child sex ratio ==
The natural "sex ratio at birth" is often considered to be around 105. This means that at birth on average, there are 105 males for every 100 females. Thus a significant departure from the ratio of 1.05 boys per every girl born indicates an imbalanced child sex ratio. Thus, India had a natural child sex ratio before 1981. But according to the 2011 census, a large city in India, Jhajjar had almost 15,000 more baby boys than baby girls, that is 128 boys per 100 girls.

== Variables that change the child sex ratio ==
=== Sex-selective abortions ===
In Asian culture, families want baby boys, because it is traditional that the boys take care of the parents, while the daughters marry and leave the family. These families want to ensure elderly security, therefore they want more boys in the family. Typically it cost more to have a daughter and they cannot contribute to the family nearly as much as the son can. These factors cause family to get an abortion because they want the variables that the boys have to offer, and it causes the child male to child female sex ratio it be imbalanced. Contrary to popular opinion, this is not driven by poorer families, but by wealthier ones, who can afford access to gender screening technology.

== Impact of skewed ratio ==
The impact of a skewed sex ratio—with more male children than females—is already being felt in some parts of India and China and is likely to continue to tighten the skewed ratio between genders.:

- When there are fewer women of marriageable age, a significant proportion of men will have to delay their marriage. This is known as the "marriage squeeze." This is when one group, of marriage eligible men, choose brides from a group of women that is fewer in numbers than the males. When the next group of eligibility enters the group there will be leftover men from the prior group added to current, group. If the woman sex ratio of eligible marriage age is significantly smaller than the men, there will be a resulting decline in fertility.
- This will initially affect younger generations of men in their 20s. These men will not only be in surplus within their cohort (age group), but they will also face competition from a backlog of older, unmarried men, who will still be in the marriage market.
- This problem will not be overcome simply by delaying marriage, due to the cumulative impact of the skewed sex ratio over several generations. Thus a proportion of men will in due course have to forgo marriage altogether. The poorest males will be disproportionately affected by this marriage squeeze. This may cause destabilization and may translate into class-based tensions.
- A larger number of unmarried men can cause havoc in the country. Relationships and marriage potentially keep these men out of trouble, therefore with the problem of not having enough women for men to marry can cause men to make poor decisions. Typically the men who are not able to marry are those of middle to low socioeconomic classes who do not have as much education, potentially leading to closing themselves off to society and engaging in violent behavior.

== See also ==
- List of states and union territories of India by sex ratio
- Lost boys (polygamy)
- Female foeticide in India
- Female Infanticide in India
- Sexy son hypothesis
- Asian Culture
- Sex-selective abortion
