= Rajmahal railway station =

Railway station in Jharkhand

Rajmahal

General information
- Location: State Highway 10, Rajmahal, Sahebganj district, Jharkhand; India
- Coordinates: 25°03′09″N 87°49′53″E
- Elevation: 34 m (112 ft)
- System: Passenger train station
- Owner: Indian Railways
- Operator: Eastern Railway zone
- Line: Sahibganj loop line
- Platforms: 2
- Tracks: 1

Construction
- Structure type: Standard (on ground station)

Other information
- Status: Active
- Station code: RJL
- Zone(s): Eastern Railway zone
- Division(s): Malda

History
- Former names: East Indian Railway Company
Location

Rajmahal railway station is a railway station on the branch of Sahibganj loop line under the Malda railway division of Eastern Railway zone. It is situated beside State Highway 10 at Rajmahal in Sahebganj district in the Indian state of Jharkhand.

== History ==
Before Farakka Barrage was made, trains to Northern Bengal & Assam used to run upto Rajmahal/RJL & Farakka/FKK, then passengers crossed Ganga by ferry & proceeded onwards. After Farakka barrage was made & the Rail-cum-Road Bridge thrown open in 1971/72, Farakka Station was closed & lines towards Farakka station were dismantled. Rajmahal station lost its importance as a train-ferry crossing station since 1972. Trains to Kolkata, Patna & Delhi from Rajmahal were withdrawn. Now just irregular shuttle service between Rajmahal & Tinpahar Jn. is left running. Rajmahal railway station is located 328 kilometres (204 mi) from Sealdah Junction Railway Station & 314 kilometres (195 mi) from Howrah Junction Railway Station

Preceding station	Indian Railways	Following station
Murli Halt towards ?	Eastern Railway zone Rajmahal branch line	Terminus
