= Chakradharpur railway station =

Railway station in Jharkhand, India

Chakradharpur

General information
- Location: Chakradharpur, West Singhbhum district, Jharkhand; India
- Coordinates: 22°40′34″N 85°37′26″E
- Elevation: 227 metres (745 ft)
- System: Indian Railways station
- Owner: Indian Railways
- Line: Tatanagar–Bilaspur section of Howrah–Nagpur–Mumbai line
- Platforms: 3

Construction
- Structure type: At ground
- Parking: Available

Other information
- Status: Active
- Station code: CKP
- Zone(s): South Eastern Railway
- Division(s): Chakradharpur
- Classification: NSG-3

History
- Opened: 1890
- Electrified: 1961–62
- Former names: Bengal Nagpur Railway

Services
Preceding station	Indian Railways	Following station
Barabambo towards ?	South Eastern Railway zone Tatanagar–Bilaspur section of Howrah–Nagpur–Mumbai line	Lotapahar towards ?
Route map
- Minor stations omitted
- Source: Indian Railway Time Table and Make my trip
Location
- Location within Jharkhand Location within India

Chakradharpur railway station (station code: CKP) is a railway station of South Eastern Railway in Chakradharpur of West Singhbhum district in the Indian state of Jharkhand. The station is on the Howrah–Nagpur–Mumbai line and serves as the divisional headquarters of the Chakradharpur railway division.

== History ==
The Bengal Nagpur Railway was formed in 1887 for the purpose of upgrading the Nagpur Chhattisgarh Railway and then extending it via Bilaspur to Asansol, in order to develop a shorter Howrah–Mumbai route than the one via Allahabad. The Bengal Nagpur Railway main line from Nagpur to Asansol, on the Howrah–Delhi main line, was opened for goods traffic on 1 February 1891.

== Electrification ==
The Purulia–Chakradharpur, Kandra–Gomharria, Sini–Adityapur, Adityapur–Tatanagar, Chakradharpur–Manoharpur and Manoharpur–Rourkela sections were electrified in 1961–62.
