= Tatanagar Junction railway station =

Railway junction station in India

TATANAGAR JUNCTION

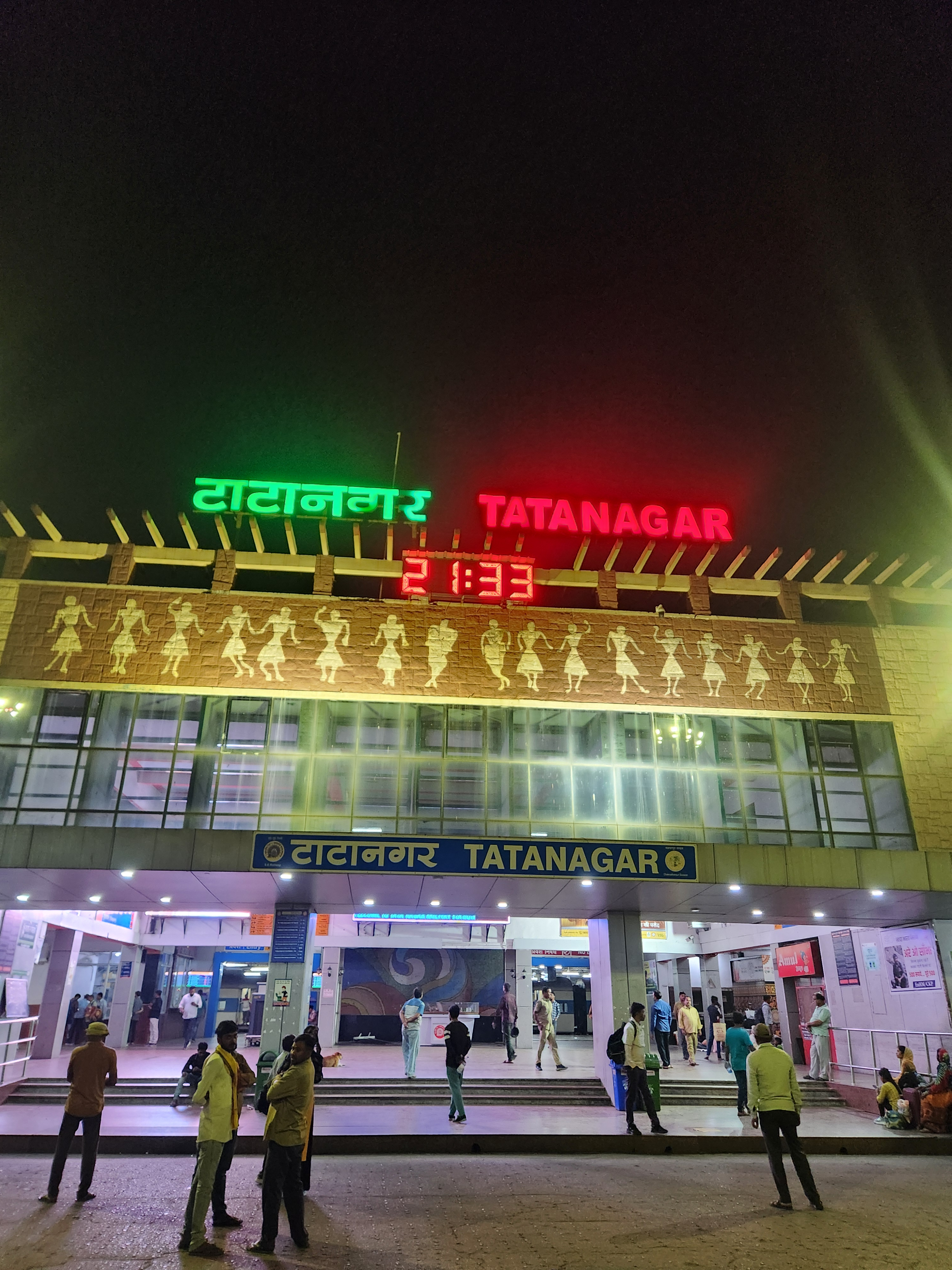
- Entrance of Tatanagar Junction railway station in Night

General information
- Location: Station Road, Jugsalai, Jamshedpur-831007, Jharkhand; India
- Coordinates: 22°46′06″N 86°12′00″E
- System: Indian Railways station
- Owner: Indian Railways
- Operator: South Eastern Railways
- Lines: Tatanagar–Bilaspur section of Howrah–Nagpur–Mumbai line; Asansol–Tatanagar–Kharagpur line; Tatanagar–Gourmahisani–Badampahar branch line
- Platforms: 6
- Tracks: 8

Construction
- Structure type: At grade
- Parking: Available
- Accessible: Available

Other information
- Status: Active
- Station code: TATA
- Zone(s): South Eastern Railway
- Division(s): Chakradharpur
- Classification: NSG-2

History
- Opened: 1910; 116 years ago
- Electrified: 1957

Passengers
- 1,00,000 per day

Other services
Location
- Location within India Location within Jharkhand
- Interactive map of Tatanagar Junction

Tatanagar Junction Railway Station, station code TATA, is the main railway station serving the city of Jamshedpur in the Indian state of Jharkhand. It is located on the Howrah–Nagpur–Mumbai line of the Indian Railways. It has 6 platforms and handles around 100 trains each day. On 26th February 2024, Prime Minister Narendra Modi virtually laid the foundation stone for the re-development of the station at cost of ₹335 Crores. GHV Infra Projects Limited has been awarded the tender for Re-development of the Station at a cost ₹284 Crores. Bhoomi Poojan was held on 12th October 2025, involves revamp to G+6 main building, G+3 second entry, increased platforms from 5 to 9.

== History ==
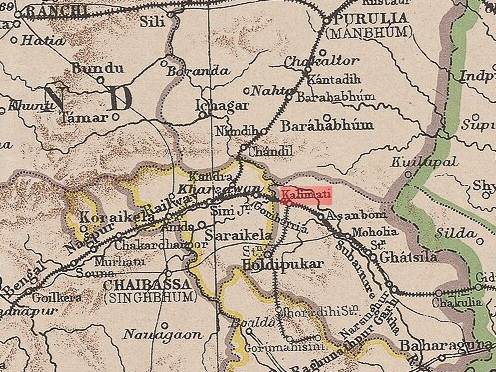
1910s map depicting Kalimati railway station.

The Tatanagar railway station was built in the early twentieth century. Sakchi was identified as the ideal site for an envisaged steel plant in December 1907. In 1910, the village Kalimati which was near Sakchi got itself a railway station on BNR's Howrah–Bombay route. The railway became the lifeline of the steel plant established by the Tatas. The name of the railway station was later changed to Tatanagar in honour of its founder Jamsetji Tata in 1919. Tatanagar–Rourkela section was the second 25 kV AC electrified section of the country, the first being Burdwan-Mughalsarai (in 1957).

The city's importance as an industrial hub encouraged travel patterns linking to much of India via the station. During smallpox eradication efforts across 1974 the station became notorious among eradication staff as "the world's greatest exporter of smallpox", exporting as many as 300 outbreaks across India and Nepal. For the duration of the epidemic train services were instead diverted to checkpoints where passengers could be assessed for symptoms of smallpox.

== Services ==
Tatanagar railway station lies on the Howrah–Mumbai route, and serves routes to places such as New Delhi, Chennai, Visakhapatnam and Orissa. It is a large station of South Eastern Railway. It falls under South Eastern Railway zone and Chakradharpur railway division. More than a 100 trains ply this route on any given day. It is one of the busiest trunk routes section of Eastern India. It includes 6 platforms, 5 for major trains while one (platform near the washing line) is used for some passenger trains.

== Trains ==
Tatanagar Junction served by several superfast, express, intercity and passenger trains from different cities, Following are some of the premium train services:

- Bhubaneswar Rajdhani Express
- Mumbai CSMT–Howrah Duronto Express
- Pune–Howrah Duronto Express
- Tatanagar–Patna Vande Bharat Express
- Tatanagar–Brahmapur Vande Bharat Express
- Howrah–Rourkela Vande Bharat Express
- Ranchi–Howrah Vande Bharat Express
- Odisha Sampark Kranti Express
- Howrah–Barbil Jan Shatabdi Express
- Santragachi–Pune Humsafar Express
- Santragachi–Rani Kamalapati Humsafar Express
- Jabalpur–Santragachi Humsafar Express
- Azad Hind Express

== See also ==
- New Delhi–Howrah main line
- Jamshedpur
- South Eastern Railway
- Adityapur
