= Chakradharpur railway division =

Railway division of India

Chakradharpur railway division is one of the four railway divisions under the jurisdiction of South Eastern Railway zone of the Indian Railways. This railway division was formed on 14 April 1952 and its headquarter is located at Chakradharpur in West Singhbhum district of the Indian state of Jharkhand.

Kharagpur railway division, Adra railway division and Ranchi railway division are the other three railway divisions under SER Zone, headquartered at Garden Reach, Kolkata.

== List of railway stations and towns ==
The list includes the stations under the Chakradharpur railway division and their station category.

Category of station	No. of stations	Names of stations
A-1 Category	1	Tatanagar Junction railway station
A Category	2	Rourkela Junction railway station, Jharsuguda Junction railway station
B Category	1	Chakradharpur
C Category (Suburban station)	1	Sini Junction railway station
D Category	—	—
E Category	—	—
F Category; Halt Station	—	—
Total	—	—

Stations closed for Passengers -
