= List of villages in East Singhbhum district =

East Singhbhum district is one of the 24 districts of Jharkhand state, India. This is the list of villages of East Singhbhum district according to respective 11 blocks.

== Baharagora ==
List of villages in Baharagora block
Sl.	Name of panchayats	Name of villages
1	Muturkham	Bansda
1	Muturkham	Gobrabani
1	Muturkham	Dholabera
1	Muturkham	Muturkham
1	Muturkham	Sirboi
1	Muturkham	Jarapal
1	Muturkham	Kandar
1	Muturkham	Kharikasol
1	Muturkham	Barol
1	Muturkham	Jamriya
1	Muturkham	Jarabani
1	Muturkham	Bodahincha
1	Muturkham	Siyalbindha
1	Muturkham	Muruniya
2	Chingra	Chingra
2	Chingra	Achrabad
2	Chingra	Dumriya
2	Chingra	Dhilahara
2	Chingra	Nadhnasol
2	Chingra	Katusol
2	Chingra	Dakshinasol
2	Chingra	Bhandarsol
2	Chingra	Arjunbera
2	Chingra	Putliyasol
2	Chingra	Kasaphaliya
2	Chingra	Hanabautiya
2	Chingra	Dombautiya
2	Chingra	Sanchingra
3	Purnapani	Buripokhar
3	Purnapani	Dudhkundi
3	Purnapani	Pachakhali
3	Purnapani	Parasiya
3	Purnapani	Mahulchui
3	Purnapani	Dandudih
3	Purnapani	Chandua
3	Purnapani	Kuldiha
3	Purnapani	Tilo
3	Purnapani	Kadokota
3	Purnapani	Simlabandhi
3	Purnapani	Purnapani
3	Purnapani	Karkata
3	Purnapani	Angarisol
3	Purnapani	Rangamatia
3	Purnapani	Dehrisol
4	Kesarda	Murakati
4	Kesarda	Kesarda
4	Kesarda	Mahuli
4	Kesarda	Chanchalda
4	Kesarda	Pathandiha
4	Kesarda	Baghrachura
4	Kesarda	Chirakuti
4	Kesarda	Kalamati
4	Kesarda	Jamsola
4	Kesarda	Purva Jambani
4	Kesarda	Aamdiha
4	Kesarda	Shirshi
5	Guhiapal	Muradevta
5	Guhiapal	Jharia
5	Guhiapal	Thakurdiha
5	Guhiapal	Maheshpur
5	Guhiapal	Asanbani
5	Guhiapal	Bankdah
5	Guhiapal	Jharapara
5	Guhiapal	Madhupur
5	Guhiapal	Darkhuli
5	Guhiapal	Guhiapal
5	Guhiapal	Baghakuli
5	Guhiapal	Dhadika
5	Guhiapal	Jotipahari
5	Guhiapal	Mohanpur
5	Guhiapal	Maghuabera
5	Guhiapal	Kotrama
5	Guhiapal	Raghunathpur
6	Pathri	Charakmara
6	Pathri	Radhanagar
6	Pathri	Jenadahi
6	Pathri	Jaipura
6	Pathri	Talpathri
6	Pathri	Pathri
6	Pathri	Dhuria
6	Pathri	Mahuldangri
6	Pathri	Pipli
6	Pathri	Kalaparasiya
6	Pathri	Bamdol
6	Pathri	Bhaliyatikri
6	Pathri	Gohaldangra
6	Pathri	Maghuabera
6	Pathri	Kuliyank
6	Pathri	Dinadahi
6	Pathri	Amlagora
6	Pathri	Talpatsiya
6	Pathri	Kamarrara
6	Pathri	Taltikri
6	Pathri	Maheshpur
6	Pathri	Murabani
7	Bankata	Kalasmohan
7	Bankata	Raghunathpur
7	Bankata	Muruniya
7	Bankata	Jalagariya
7	Bankata	Balagariya
7	Bankata	Solagariya
7	Bankata	Darkhuli
7	Bankata	Polikantaliya
7	Bankata	Chandiyas
7	Bankata	Nischintpur
7	Bankata	Nekrakandan
7	Bankata	Dumriya
7	Bankata	Bildubrajpur
7	Bankata	Kemi
7	Bankata	Salbani
7	Bankata	Benda
7	Bankata	Kui
7	Bankata	Bankata
7	Bankata	Bindabani
7	Bankata	Dahigram
7	Bankata	Bandihar
7	Bankata	Bhandariya
7	Bankata	Maluapal
7	Bankata	Madhubanpur
7	Bankata	Benagariya
7	Bankata	Medhadan
7	Bankata	Gourangpur
8	Mouda	Dubrajpur
8	Mouda	Mouda
8	Mouda	Khudputli
8	Mouda	Dudhiyasol
8	Mouda	Jhatiyasol
8	Mouda	Kankrisol
8	Mouda	Mahulisol
8	Mouda	Domsol
8	Mouda	Bankati
8	Mouda	Barigram
8	Mouda	Dakshinasol
8	Mouda	Khairbani
8	Mouda	Rungram
8	Mouda	Pochagariya
9	Patpur	Patpur
9	Patpur	Mohanpur
9	Patpur	Pithapura
9	Patpur	Bhurshan
9	Patpur	Kewla
9	Patpur	Bhagabandi
9	Patpur	Hijli
9	Patpur	Gurursai
9	Patpur	Gumardubi
10	Rajlabandh	Patbera
10	Rajlabandh	Jagdha
10	Rajlabandh	Rajlabandh
10	Rajlabandh	Rasikpur
10	Rajlabandh	Kalia
10	Rajlabandh	Uinala
10	Rajlabandh	Kuldiha
10	Rajlabandh	Baharagora
10	Rajlabandh	Ichrasol
10	Rajlabandh	Kapariya
10	Rajlabandh	Singhpura
10	Rajlabandh	Malkhanda
10	Rajlabandh	Chandanasol
10	Rajlabandh	Lohabani
10	Rajlabandh	Murabani
10	Rajlabandh	Anistarpur
10	Rajlabandh	Khejuriya
11	Matihana	Kenduabandhi
11	Matihana	Murakati Matiyal
11	Matihana	Kalabadiya
11	Matihana	Kantasola
11	Matihana	Noukata
11	Matihana	Jamirdiha
11	Matihana	Kokmara
11	Matihana	Kunwarda
11	Matihana	Matihana
11	Matihana	Rangiadhara
11	Matihana	Lalmuni Dubrajpur
11	Matihana	Kanthaliya
11	Matihana	Amlatola
11	Matihana	Sonajuria
11	Matihana	Patna
11	Matihana	Churamanipur
11	Matihana	Ishania
11	Matihana	Parasiya
11	Matihana	Kotsol
11	Matihana	Badsol
11	Matihana	Baisnabdangra
11	Matihana	Biharipur
11	Matihana	Balighati
11	Matihana	Tal Parasiya
12	Bhutiya	Ghaghra
12	Bhutiya	Bhutiya
12	Bhutiya	Angarisol
12	Bhutiya	Mangrosol
12	Bhutiya	Jugisol
12	Bhutiya	Gowalmara
12	Bhutiya	Chandrapur
12	Bhutiya	Baniakudar
12	Bhutiya	Phulkusma
12	Bhutiya	Bhaliadih
12	Bhutiya	Kadamdiha
12	Bhutiya	Dharampur
12	Bhutiya	Laodanka
12	Bhutiya	Satpati
13	Pathra	Badbeda
13	Pathra	Kanyanagri
13	Pathra	Saldoha
13	Pathra	Pathra
13	Pathra	Jantkata
13	Pathra	Bhalukkhulia
13	Pathra	Gourisol
13	Pathra	Nakdoha
13	Pathra	Pankhisol
13	Pathra	Gandanata
13	Pathra	Benasoli
14	Manusmuria	Jamjurki
14	Manusmuria	Balidiha
14	Manusmuria	Sonakoda
14	Manusmuria	Paklo
14	Manusmuria	Sijua
14	Manusmuria	Dhanghori
14	Manusmuria	Manusmuria
14	Manusmuria	Nayagram
14	Manusmuria	Talbera
15	Sandra	Bhadua
15	Sandra	Swargchinra
15	Sandra	Benasoli
15	Sandra	Lugahara
15	Sandra	Bara Dhodangri
15	Sandra	Lodhanbani
15	Sandra	Panisol
15	Sandra	Khejurdiha
15	Sandra	Jhanjia
15	Sandra	Manglasasan Darkhuli
15	Sandra	Chota Dhodangri
15	Sandra	Sandra
15	Sandra	Adang
15	Sandra	Masda
15	Sandra	Amlatola
16	Khandamouda	Jambani
16	Khandamouda	Sankhabhanga
16	Khandamouda	Darisol
16	Khandamouda	Khandamouda
16	Khandamouda	Paiknagri
16	Khandamouda	Majhigram
16	Khandamouda	Magudiha
16	Khandamouda	Pachruliya
16	Khandamouda	Kusmi
16	Khandamouda	Khanti
16	Khandamouda	Khamar
16	Khandamouda	Digbarda
16	Khandamouda	Dighimura
16	Khandamouda	Asanbani
16	Khandamouda	Phulbadiya
16	Khandamouda	Kuchgari
16	Khandamouda	Gopinathpur
16	Khandamouda	Chota Arjuna
16	Khandamouda	Bara Arjuna
17	Gamariya	Murakati
17	Gamariya	Kendua
17	Gamariya	Mahakudiya
17	Gamariya	Buridahi
17	Gamariya	Mahulbarai
17	Gamariya	Benapara
17	Gamariya	Malua
17	Gamariya	Teghari
17	Gamariya	Rajbandh
17	Gamariya	Nedra
17	Gamariya	Niramishri
17	Gamariya	Salbani
17	Gamariya	Chota Sirsi
17	Gamariya	Mesad
17	Gamariya	Chaitanpur
17	Gamariya	Gamariya
17	Gamariya	Jharia
17	Gamariya	Salbanibasa
17	Gamariya	Ghantuasol
17	Gamariya	Barahmaniya
17	Gamariya	Nayagram
18	Domjuri	Nekradiha
18	Domjuri	Domjuri
18	Domjuri	Bangora
18	Domjuri	Hariharpur
18	Domjuri	Kolarama
18	Domjuri	Nadiyapal
18	Domjuri	Govindpur
18	Domjuri	Itamadua
18	Domjuri	Nayagram
18	Domjuri	Iktal
18	Domjuri	Gourchandrapur
18	Domjuri	Raghunathpur
18	Domjuri	Jamsola
18	Domjuri	Banabura
18	Domjuri	Asna
18	Domjuri	Malbandhi
18	Domjuri	Gopinathpur
18	Domjuri	Kasipur
18	Domjuri	Baikunthpur
18	Domjuri	Narayanpur
18	Domjuri	Malua
19	Sakra	Jugansalbani
19	Sakra	Golaparasiya
19	Sakra	Simantpur
19	Sakra	Amdangra
19	Sakra	Gourangi
19	Sakra	Amladih
19	Sakra	Dhadika
19	Sakra	Bandhgora
19	Sakra	Sakra
19	Sakra	Dighi
19	Sakra	Kutigram
19	Sakra	Taliya
19	Sakra	Baghuri
19	Sakra	Gamariya
19	Sakra	Jamira
19	Sakra	Jaruliya
19	Sakra	Paruliya
19	Sakra	Shasan
19	Sakra	Bankati
19	Sakra	Ghatdubrajpur
19	Sakra	Bela
19	Sakra	Asti
19	Sakra	Chanbadiya
19	Sakra	Simariya
19	Sakra	Belberiya
19	Sakra	Murabani
19	Sakra	Gopidih
19	Sakra	Sirsi
19	Sakra	Nalkachra
19	Sakra	Dhodangri
19	Sakra	Bhandarisol
19	Sakra	Khadikasol
19	Sakra	Godsanda
19	Sakra	Panuwadih Bankati
19	Sakra	Kadomohanpur
19	Sakra	Tomabani
20	Baragariya	Batbati
20	Baragariya	Panchpokhriya
20	Baragariya	Benagariya
20	Baragariya	Panipara
20	Baragariya	Asurara
20	Baragariya	Nagursai
20	Baragariya	Baragariya
20	Baragariya	Bhalukkhuliya
20	Baragariya	Palasbani
20	Baragariya	Kanimahuli
20	Baragariya	Angarpara
20	Baragariya	Dubrajpur
20	Baragariya	Indadangar
20	Baragariya	Asangariya
20	Baragariya	Ghatbura
20	Baragariya	Kendudiha
20	Baragariya	Hadbhanga
20	Baragariya	Brindabanpur
20	Baragariya	Kendumuri
20	Baragariya	Dakshinasol
20	Baragariya	Lohamaniya
20	Baragariya	Dipapal
20	Baragariya	Bahakuriya
21	Bahuliya	Rangunia
21	Bahuliya	Pachando
21	Bahuliya	Chitreshwar
21	Bahuliya	Saljhatiya
21	Bahuliya	Godha
21	Bahuliya	Dhanadahi
21	Bahuliya	Bahuliya
21	Bahuliya	Bhalukkhulia
21	Bahuliya	Kashikhandban
21	Bahuliya	Pithapura
21	Bahuliya	Khadikasol
21	Bahuliya	Chaunisol
21	Bahuliya	Bisakuriya
21	Bahuliya	Handuliya
21	Bahuliya	Ektal
21	Bahuliya	Doati
21	Bahuliya	Jarkanda
21	Bahuliya	Kashipal
22	Kumardubi	Chandra
22	Kumardubi	Niranjanpur
22	Kumardubi	Kumardubi
22	Kumardubi	Darkhuli
22	Kumardubi	Majhipara
22	Kumardubi	Dhuliapara
22	Kumardubi	Narayanpur
22	Kumardubi	Pratappur
22	Kumardubi	Phulkundiya
22	Kumardubi	Malkunda
22	Kumardubi	Patpur
22	Kumardubi	Kiajharia
22	Kumardubi	Chandabila
22	Kumardubi	Baghkuli
22	Kumardubi	Becha
22	Kumardubi	Rajbandh
22	Kumardubi	Swargchinra
23	Chota Paruliya	Kostarua
23	Chota Paruliya	Chormundi
23	Chota Paruliya	Chota Tarua
23	Chota Paruliya	Bara Tarua
23	Chota Paruliya	Tetuldanga
23	Chota Paruliya	Patharghata
23	Chota Paruliya	Kokromaragariya
23	Chota Paruliya	Jagannathpur
23	Chota Paruliya	Chota Paruliya
23	Chota Paruliya	Lalsai
23	Chota Paruliya	Gurursai
23	Chota Paruliya	Bara Paruliya
23	Chota Paruliya	Lohamaliya
23	Chota Paruliya	Rarpara
23	Chota Paruliya	Baromania
24	Brahmankundi	Brahmankundi
24	Brahmankundi	Belbaria
24	Brahmankundi	Ghaspada
24	Brahmankundi	Panchbadiya
24	Brahmankundi	Barakulia
24	Brahmankundi	Olda
24	Brahmankundi	Gahlamura
24	Brahmankundi	Jauri
24	Brahmankundi	Netra
24	Brahmankundi	Gamariya
24	Brahmankundi	Panditani
24	Brahmankundi	Asti
24	Brahmankundi	Kendudiha
24	Brahmankundi	Nayabasan
24	Brahmankundi	Balikundia
24	Brahmankundi	Chotakulia
24	Brahmankundi	Baisnabdol
24	Brahmankundi	Matihana
25	Khedua	Dudhkundi
25	Khedua	Darisol
25	Khedua	Hudli
25	Khedua	Khedua
25	Khedua	Jaipura
25	Khedua	Karoriya
25	Khedua	Samsanda
25	Khedua	Dubli
25	Khedua	Maragariya
25	Khedua	Bansidharpur
26	Gopalpur	Jamsola
26	Gopalpur	Ramchandrapur
26	Gopalpur	Sarsabera
26	Gopalpur	Badsol
26	Gopalpur	Chaichasol
26	Gopalpur	Itamadua
26	Gopalpur	Gobrasol
26	Gopalpur	Jugdiha
26	Gopalpur	Nekragunji
26	Gopalpur	Surmuhi
26	Gopalpur	Gopalpur
26	Gopalpur	Dhowachandra
26	Gopalpur	Parasiya
26	Gopalpur	Dhuliapara
26	Gopalpur	Nandariya
26	Gopalpur	Khenkisiyal
26	Gopalpur	Phulsundari
26	Gopalpur	Brindabanpur
26	Gopalpur	Bankatia

== Boram ==
List of villages in Boram block
Sl.	Name of panchayats	Name of villages
1	Pokhariya	Pokhariya
1	Pokhariya	Rechadih
1	Pokhariya	Chunidih
1	Pokhariya	Hatiadih
1	Pokhariya	Bara Chirka
1	Pokhariya	Potkadih
2	Madhabpur	Chota Chirka
2	Madhabpur	Rechadih
2	Madhabpur	Rajahata
2	Madhabpur	Palasdih
2	Madhabpur	Madhabpur
2	Madhabpur	Telidih
3	Gourdih	Namsol
3	Gourdih	Rupshan
3	Gourdih	Chirudih
3	Gourdih	Penada
3	Gourdih	Dundu
3	Gourdih	Gourdih
3	Gourdih	Chota Bangurda
4	Mukrudih	Chamidih
4	Mukrudih	Bhuni
4	Mukrudih	Guglubani
4	Mukrudih	Mukrudih
4	Mukrudih	Haludbani
4	Mukrudih	Kadamjora
5	Rasiknagar	Rasiknagar
5	Rasiknagar	Shukla
5	Rasiknagar	Chota Susni
5	Rasiknagar	Bara Susni
6	Bhula	Lawjora
6	Bhula	Bhula
6	Bhula	Kandrujona
6	Bhula	Damodarpur
6	Bhula	Mohanpur
7	Beldih	Joba
7	Beldih	Gangiburu
7	Beldih	Bakada
7	Beldih	Sobhada
7	Beldih	Bangoi
7	Beldih	Beldih
8	Boram	Boram
8	Boram	Andharjhor
8	Boram	Dangdung
9	Kuiyani	Mohribasa
9	Kuiyani	Jhilingdungri
9	Kuiyani	Baghra
9	Kuiyani	Kuiyani
9	Kuiyani	Dhobani
9	Kuiyani	Muchidih
10	Paharpur	Paharpur
10	Paharpur	Sasangdih
10	Paharpur	Somadih
10	Paharpur	Chamta
10	Paharpur	Aamjhor
10	Paharpur	Dangardih
10	Paharpur	Khokhro
10	Paharpur	Koira
11	Bonta	Bonta
11	Bonta	Kutimakuli
11	Bonta	Bhadudih
11	Bonta	Saldoha
11	Bonta	Haludbani
11	Bonta	Patipani
11	Bonta	Mirzadih
11	Bonta	Gerua
11	Bonta	Chimti
12	Lailam	Brajpur
12	Lailam	Punsa
12	Lailam	Nutandih
12	Lailam	Lailam
12	Lailam	Pagda
12	Lailam	Rapacha
12	Lailam	Kumari

== Chakulia ==
List of villages in Chakulia block
Sl.	Name of panchayats	Name of villages
1	Matiyabandhi	Pakuriyasol
1	Matiyabandhi	Ghaghra
1	Matiyabandhi	Durgadih
1	Matiyabandhi	Ganga
1	Matiyabandhi	Basadiha
1	Matiyabandhi	Khariyasol
1	Matiyabandhi	Yamuna
1	Matiyabandhi	Baliyaguri
1	Matiyabandhi	Barasoli
1	Matiyabandhi	Pathraghati
1	Matiyabandhi	Gomro
1	Matiyabandhi	Nagrinala
1	Matiyabandhi	Matiyabandhi
1	Matiyabandhi	Kumarpur
1	Matiyabandhi	Maghuasoli
1	Matiyabandhi	Sindra
1	Matiyabandhi	Jaipur
1	Matiyabandhi	Ghanghori
2	Badrikanpur-Kalapathar	Badrikanpur
2	Badrikanpur-Kalapathar	Meruduba
2	Badrikanpur-Kalapathar	Mayurnachni
2	Badrikanpur-Kalapathar	Badamchati
2	Badrikanpur-Kalapathar	Jamira
2	Badrikanpur-Kalapathar	Kalapathar
2	Badrikanpur-Kalapathar	Dadika
2	Badrikanpur-Kalapathar	Machkandna
2	Badrikanpur-Kalapathar	Kalajhor
2	Badrikanpur-Kalapathar	Narsinghpur
2	Badrikanpur-Kalapathar	Kantabani
2	Badrikanpur-Kalapathar	Madhupur
2	Badrikanpur-Kalapathar	Phulpani
2	Badrikanpur-Kalapathar	Bhaluknala
2	Badrikanpur-Kalapathar	Jobhi
2	Badrikanpur-Kalapathar	Lawbera
2	Badrikanpur-Kalapathar	Pochapani
3	Chalunia	Duarisol
3	Chalunia	Biharipur
3	Chalunia	Burisol
3	Chalunia	Dubrajpur
3	Chalunia	Jainagar
3	Chalunia	Salgariya
3	Chalunia	Tulsibani
3	Chalunia	Bhandru
3	Chalunia	Joram
3	Chalunia	Kiyasol
3	Chalunia	Chalunia
3	Chalunia	Kendadangri
3	Chalunia	Sisakhun
3	Chalunia	Simantasol
3	Chalunia	Kantabani
4	Simdi	Bhalukapahari
4	Simdi	Amlagora
4	Simdi	Kishoripur
4	Simdi	Kumarisol
4	Simdi	Sarasbad
4	Simdi	Simdi
4	Simdi	Panijiya
4	Simdi	Baradangua
4	Simdi	Darkhuli
4	Simdi	Malibani
4	Simdi	Baghghori
4	Simdi	Baikunthpur
4	Simdi	Bagduba
4	Simdi	Lohamaliya
5	Birdoh	Birdoh
5	Birdoh	Gamariya
5	Birdoh	Raghunathpur
5	Birdoh	Dhengam
5	Birdoh	Shyamsundarpur
5	Birdoh	Baranata
5	Birdoh	Tilabani
5	Birdoh	Kuldiha
5	Birdoh	Kadamdiha
5	Birdoh	Chandowa
5	Birdoh	Phaldhua
5	Birdoh	Rengarpahari
5	Birdoh	Luagram
6	Bend	Salbani
6	Bend	Dukda
6	Bend	Bend
6	Bend	Barakanali
6	Bend	Bamniya
6	Bend	Khairbani
6	Bend	Kukrapahari
6	Bend	Patharchakri
6	Bend	Jagannathpur
6	Bend	Kanimahuli
6	Bend	Amdangra
6	Bend	Bankati
6	Bend	Jamunabhula
6	Bend	Jharia
7	Jugitopa	Kalidaspur
7	Jugitopa	Sijberia
7	Jugitopa	Sonahara
7	Jugitopa	Saluadih
7	Jugitopa	Malkundi
7	Jugitopa	Hatiasoli
7	Jugitopa	Jugitopa
7	Jugitopa	Mardabandh
7	Jugitopa	Barasoli
7	Jugitopa	Kadmasoli
7	Jugitopa	Rangamatia
7	Jugitopa	Talpal
7	Jugitopa	Mishrikata
7	Jugitopa	Murathakura
7	Jugitopa	Baghasoli
8	Kuchiyasol	Balibandh
8	Kuchiyasol	Salkagariya
8	Kuchiyasol	Dhodangri
8	Kuchiyasol	Bagtoliya
8	Kuchiyasol	Raspal
8	Kuchiyasol	Swargchinra
8	Kuchiyasol	Kuchiyasoli
8	Kuchiyasol	Bahadurpur
8	Kuchiyasol	Madhupur
8	Kuchiyasol	Matapur
8	Kuchiyasol	Khadbandha
8	Kuchiyasol	Pandrasoli
8	Kuchiyasol	Jirapara
8	Kuchiyasol	Kusmati
9	Bhatkunda	Kasiyabera
9	Bhatkunda	Bhalukbindha
9	Bhatkunda	Baghbasa
9	Bhatkunda	Chiyabandhi
9	Bhatkunda	Sandpura
9	Bhatkunda	Rangamatia
9	Bhatkunda	Bhatkunda
9	Bhatkunda	Jordiha
9	Bhatkunda	Dakshinasol
9	Bhatkunda	Sunsuniya
9	Bhatkunda	Dhowasol
10	Sonahatu	Badiyagajar
10	Sonahatu	Devtanala
10	Sonahatu	Raghunathpur
10	Sonahatu	Malkham
10	Sonahatu	Amabhula
10	Sonahatu	Charaiduba
10	Sonahatu	Jorisa
10	Sonahatu	Chatradoba
10	Sonahatu	Sonahatu
10	Sonahatu	Muturkham
10	Sonahatu	Chaolisol
10	Sonahatu	Kendbani
10	Sonahatu	Andhariya
11	Malkundi	Madhupur
11	Malkundi	Malkundi
11	Malkundi	Jamdol
11	Malkundi	Satkatiya
11	Malkundi	Kendadangri
11	Malkundi	Badamchati
11	Malkundi	Nayagram
11	Malkundi	Sindurgouri
11	Malkundi	Jamsol
11	Malkundi	Lakhipur
11	Malkundi	Domro
11	Malkundi	Kutrapara
11	Malkundi	Kantabani
11	Malkundi	Muktapur
11	Malkundi	Baliduma
11	Malkundi	Lakhihira
11	Malkundi	Barkola
11	Malkundi	Bainagla
11	Malkundi	Dudhiasol
11	Malkundi	Punda
11	Malkundi	Pindrasol
11	Malkundi	Kuchiakanali
12	Kaliyam	Panijiya
12	Kaliyam	Belboriya
12	Kaliyam	Titiha
12	Kaliyam	Sandangri
12	Kaliyam	Tal Tetuliya
12	Kaliyam	Dhadhika
12	Kaliyam	Lataghar
12	Kaliyam	Kankrachowk
12	Kaliyam	Agunkola
12	Kaliyam	Godrasol
12	Kaliyam	Hathibari
12	Kaliyam	Kaliyam
12	Kaliyam	Rajabasa
12	Kaliyam	Sapua
12	Kaliyam	Khaddeoli
12	Kaliyam	Taldangra
12	Kaliyam	Akhuapara
12	Kaliyam	Kalajharia
12	Kaliyam	Burujabani
12	Kaliyam	Damodarpur
12	Kaliyam	Tal Bhurshani
12	Kaliyam	Upar Tetuliya
12	Kaliyam	Salbani
12	Kaliyam	Tasrisol
12	Kaliyam	Kanthaliya
12	Kaliyam	Kadamdiha
12	Kaliyam	Matgoda
12	Kaliyam	Bandhgoda
12	Kaliyam	Upar Bhurshani
12	Kaliyam	Gohaldangra
12	Kaliyam	Jambani
13	Chandanpur	Pukhuria
13	Chandanpur	Mahulbani
13	Chandanpur	Gargariya
13	Chandanpur	Sakabhanga
13	Chandanpur	Dakui
13	Chandanpur	Jharia
13	Chandanpur	Pitajuri
13	Chandanpur	Bartoliya
13	Chandanpur	Chandanpur
13	Chandanpur	Chotagariyas
13	Chandanpur	Baragariyas
14	Shyamsundarpur	Khairbani
14	Shyamsundarpur	Khadikasoli
14	Shyamsundarpur	Birbhanga
14	Shyamsundarpur	Dudhiyasol
14	Shyamsundarpur	Shyamsundarpur
14	Shyamsundarpur	Nayagram
14	Shyamsundarpur	Dhadsol
14	Shyamsundarpur	Betna
14	Shyamsundarpur	Benasoli
14	Shyamsundarpur	Brajballabhpur Tola
15	Jamua	Kerukocha
15	Jamua	Buangdih
15	Jamua	Bamandih
15	Jamua	Parasiya
15	Jamua	Haripur
15	Jamua	Hariniya
15	Jamua	Bhaduakocha
15	Jamua	Jamua
15	Jamua	Indbani
15	Jamua	Sanghati
15	Jamua	Jamdohri
15	Jamua	Khejuriya
15	Jamua	Machadiha
16	Baramara	Mordiha
16	Baramara	Rangamatia
16	Baramara	Mural
16	Baramara	Baramara
16	Baramara	Purnapani
16	Baramara	Nimdiha
16	Baramara	Makri
16	Baramara	Chouthiya
17	Lodhasoli	Lodhasoli
17	Lodhasoli	Deosol
17	Lodhasoli	Katasmara
17	Lodhasoli	Khadbandha
17	Lodhasoli	Amlagora
17	Lodhasoli	Nimdiha
17	Lodhasoli	Sindurgouri
17	Lodhasoli	Rajbandh
17	Lodhasoli	Kalsimung
17	Lodhasoli	Kolbadiya
18	Kalapathar	Kalapathar
18	Kalapathar	Nimdiha
18	Kalapathar	Rugrisol
18	Kalapathar	Betjharia
18	Kalapathar	Bhandosol
18	Kalapathar	Bagdiha
18	Kalapathar	Udal
18	Kalapathar	Maheshpur
18	Kalapathar	Dumurdiha
18	Kalapathar	Bankati
19	Sardiha	Morabandhi
19	Sardiha	Pakuriya
19	Sardiha	Sapdhora
19	Sardiha	Rupushkundi
19	Sardiha	Kasiya
19	Sardiha	Dakshinasol
19	Sardiha	Banksol
19	Sardiha	Kendadangri
19	Sardiha	Sardiha
19	Sardiha	Panibanka

== Dhalbhumgarh ==
List of villages in Dhalbhumgarh block
Sl.	Name of panchayats	Name of villages
1	Junbuni	Harindhukri
1	Junbuni	Raghunathdih
1	Junbuni	Dobha
1	Junbuni	Junbuni
1	Junbuni	Bagula
2	Moudasoli	Amadubi
2	Moudasoli	Chirugora
2	Moudasoli	Tetuldanga
2	Moudasoli	Nuagram
2	Moudasoli	Baghuasoli
2	Moudasoli	Bharudih
2	Moudasoli	Sonakhun
2	Moudasoli	Bartoliya
2	Moudasoli	Bhadua
2	Moudasoli	Moudasoli
2	Moudasoli	Patkasoli
2	Moudasoli	Sundardih
2	Moudasoli	Sarbila
3	Chukripara	Chukripara
3	Chukripara	Swargchinra
3	Chukripara	Haldajuri
3	Chukripara	Behda
3	Chukripara	Ukarbahal
3	Chukripara	Jarpogora
3	Chukripara	Panijiya
3	Chukripara	Uparsoli
3	Chukripara	Pariasoli
3	Chukripara	Jagannathpur
3	Chukripara	Mohanpur
4	Raotara	Babeda
4	Raotara	Karuakata
4	Raotara	Raotara
4	Raotara	Dudhposi
4	Raotara	Basajhor
4	Raotara	Gudgaikocha
4	Raotara	Nuagaon
4	Raotara	Hathibari
4	Raotara	Durigariya
4	Raotara	Mahisadhara
4	Raotara	Nischintpur
4	Raotara	Palasbani
4	Raotara	Kendbani
5	Jugisol	Bamnisel
5	Jugisol	Chatro
5	Jugisol	Sidhsol
5	Jugisol	Sundisol
5	Jugisol	Dalki
5	Jugisol	Panduda
5	Jugisol	Samka
5	Jugisol	Jugisol
5	Jugisol	Natkata
5	Jugisol	Kukrakhupi
5	Jugisol	Tilabani
5	Jugisol	Paharpur
6	Pawra Narsinghgarh	Bhairabpur
6	Pawra Narsinghgarh	Pawra Narsinghgarh
6	Pawra Narsinghgarh	Dudhchua
6	Pawra Narsinghgarh	Ruasol
6	Pawra Narsinghgarh	Ghoradhua
6	Pawra Narsinghgarh	Dakshinabad
6	Pawra Narsinghgarh	Punisa
6	Pawra Narsinghgarh	Rajabera
6	Pawra Narsinghgarh	Deosol
6	Pawra Narsinghgarh	Swargchinra
7	Kanas	Chabisa
7	Kanas	Chouria
7	Kanas	Betjharia
7	Kanas	Kanas
7	Kanas	Ramasoli
7	Kanas	Bangarkola
7	Kanas	Derang
7	Kanas	Sirisbani
7	Kanas	Ektaal
8	Kokpara Narsinghgarh	Charchakka
8	Kokpara Narsinghgarh	Patnaiksol
8	Kokpara Narsinghgarh	Kokpara Narsinghgarh
9	Nutangarh	Ghasidih
9	Nutangarh	Kanimohuli
9	Nutangarh	Burudih
9	Nutangarh	Ulda
9	Nutangarh	Murakati
9	Nutangarh	Banskatiya
9	Nutangarh	Talgoglo
9	Nutangarh	Goglo
9	Nutangarh	Tikrapara
9	Nutangarh	Jorsol
9	Nutangarh	Aamda
9	Nutangarh	Ghoshda
9	Nutangarh	Kandrapara
9	Nutangarh	Manikabera
9	Nutangarh	Kakurrama
9	Nutangarh	Kadambera
9	Nutangarh	Sarengasol
9	Nutangarh	Nutangarh
10	Mohulisol	Bihinda
10	Mohulisol	Mohulisol
10	Mohulisol	Gorabari
10	Mohulisol	Dongra
10	Mohulisol	Ekaghariya
10	Mohulisol	Kharbanda
10	Mohulisol	Choira
10	Mohulisol	Chatro
10	Mohulisol	Nayadih
11	Kokpara	Duliapara
11	Kokpara	Jamua
11	Kokpara	Kokpara
11	Kokpara	Dhadkibani
11	Kokpara	Naldhua
11	Kokpara	Ghoratoriya

== Dumaria ==
List of villages in Dumaria block
Sl.	Name of panchayats	Name of villages
1	Kendua	Badalkocha
1	Kendua	Kaliyamkocha
1	Kendua	Dublabera
1	Kendua	Lango
1	Kendua	Badalgora
1	Kendua	Rangamatia
1	Kendua	Jungle block
1	Kendua	Hatnabera
1	Kendua	Bomro
1	Kendua	Kendua
2	Khairbani	Damukocha
2	Khairbani	Bhitar Amda
2	Khairbani	Lakhaidih
2	Khairbani	Gajidih
2	Khairbani	Kashmar
2	Khairbani	Damudih
2	Khairbani	Damdi
2	Khairbani	Khairbani
2	Khairbani	Bankati
3	Bankisol	Bankisol
3	Bankisol	Kundaluka
3	Bankisol	Dibudih
3	Bankisol	Murakanjiya
4	Barakanjiya	Rangamatia
4	Barakanjiya	Nayagram
4	Barakanjiya	Barakanjiya
4	Barakanjiya	Dumaria
4	Barakanjiya	Jadugora
5	Kumrasol	Kumrasol
5	Kumrasol	Ichadih
5	Kumrasol	Pandusai
5	Kumrasol	Kasidih
5	Kumrasol	Bhalukpatra
5	Kumrasol	Hatibari
5	Kumrasol	Nischintpur
5	Kumrasol	Karansai
5	Kumrasol	Parsa
5	Kumrasol	Punasibad
6	Kharida	Kharida
6	Kharida	Jambani
6	Kharida	Bhagabandi
6	Kharida	Pathrasai
6	Kharida	Khatpal
6	Kharida	Besarpahari
7	Dholabera	Harebera
7	Dholabera	Narsinghbahal
7	Dholabera	Karida
7	Dholabera	Baruniya
7	Dholabera	Kolabariya
7	Dholabera	Dasadih
7	Dholabera	Janegora
7	Dholabera	Chatanipani
7	Dholabera	Kasibera
7	Dholabera	Sunudor
7	Dholabera	Dholabera
7	Dholabera	Phuljhari
8	Kantasol	Kantasol
8	Kantasol	Dighi
8	Kantasol	Katakati
8	Kantasol	Harda
8	Kantasol	Manda
8	Kantasol	Barudih
8	Kantasol	Manoharpur
8	Kantasol	Jarhi
8	Kantasol	Haldibani
8	Kantasol	Nuniya
8	Kantasol	Marangsongha
8	Kantasol	Ghaghda
8	Kantasol	Satbakhra
8	Kantasol	Pitamahli
9	Palasbani	Palasbani
9	Palasbani	Manikpur
9	Palasbani	Kalimati
9	Palasbani	Seraldih
9	Palasbani	Bara Botla
9	Palasbani	Forest block
9	Palasbani	Bakrakocha
9	Palasbani	Marotoliya
9	Palasbani	Chota Botla
10	Astakowali	Astakowali
10	Astakowali	Bhagabera
10	Astakowali	Chota Asti
10	Astakowali	Panchangora
10	Astakowali	Chaidiha
10	Astakowali	Jamda
10	Astakowali	Bara Asti
10	Astakowali	Kaliyam
10	Astakowali	Satpura
10	Astakowali	Chingra
10	Astakowali	Chakri

== Ghatshila ==
List of villages in Ghatshila block
Sl.	Name of panchayats	Name of villages
1	Baghuria	Paharpur
1	Baghuria	Chadri
1	Baghuria	Gurajhor
1	Baghuria	Mirgitanr
1	Baghuria	Narsinghpur
1	Baghuria	Haludbani
1	Baghuria	Kesarpur
1	Baghuria	Baghuria
1	Baghuria	Kaspani
1	Baghuria	Kasiya
2	Barakhursi	Nischintpur
2	Barakhursi	Kuliyana
2	Barakhursi	Pairaguri
2	Barakhursi	Darisai
2	Barakhursi	Baghbindha
2	Barakhursi	Bara Khursi
2	Barakhursi	Chota Khursi
2	Barakhursi	Aamchuria
2	Barakhursi	Sundarkanali
2	Barakhursi	Salbani
2	Barakhursi	Lepadabar
2	Barakhursi	Ghutia
2	Barakhursi	Bandhdih
2	Barakhursi	Khuntadih
3	Jorisa	Pindrabad
3	Jorisa	Cholagora
3	Jorisa	Kamarigora
3	Jorisa	Bagalgora
3	Jorisa	Churinda
3	Jorisa	Dumurbahal
3	Jorisa	Jorisa
3	Jorisa	Barbil
4	Ulda	Barapahar
4	Ulda	Digri
4	Ulda	Gopalpur
4	Ulda	Susnigariya
4	Ulda	Ulda
4	Ulda	Chandrarekha
4	Ulda	Deoli
4	Ulda	Berahatu
4	Ulda	Putru
5	Mahulia	Galudih
5	Mahulia	Bodhpur
5	Mahulia	Kalimati
5	Mahulia	Karanjia
5	Mahulia	Bhalukkhulia
5	Mahulia	Sirsa
5	Mahulia	Ghikuli
5	Mahulia	Patmahulia
5	Mahulia	Mahulia
5	Mahulia	Barabakra
6	Hendaljuri	Thakurbari
6	Hendaljuri	Hendaljuri
6	Hendaljuri	Kalajhor
6	Hendaljuri	Rajabasa
6	Hendaljuri	Haludbani
6	Hendaljuri	Brindabanpur
6	Hendaljuri	Dhamakbera
6	Hendaljuri	Cholagora
7	Bankati	Bankati
7	Bankati	Jhaprisol
7	Bankati	Jagannathpur
7	Bankati	Betalpur
7	Bankati	Kankrisol
8	North Maobhandar	Phulpal
8	North Maobhandar	Kitadih
8	North Maobhandar	Maobhandar
9	West Maobhandar	Maobhandar
10	East Maobhandar	Maobhandar
11	Gopalpur	Gopalpur
12	Dharambahal	Gopalpur
12	Dharambahal	Dharambahal
12	Dharambahal	Edalbera
12	Dharambahal	Susnijobni
13	Pawra	Pawra
13	Pawra	Sandpura
13	Pawra	Nuagram
14	Ghatshila	Amainagar
14	Ghatshila	Ghatshila
15	Kasida	Chengjora
15	Kasida	Upar Pawra
15	Kasida	Gahandih
15	Kasida	Mahlidih
15	Kasida	Tamakpal
15	Kasida	Kalapathar
15	Kasida	Anidih
15	Kasida	Kasida
15	Kasida	Bikrampur
15	Kasida	Chalakdih
16	Kalchiti	Basadera
16	Kalchiti	Tikri
16	Kalchiti	Burudih
16	Kalchiti	Kalchiti
16	Kalchiti	Ramchandrapur
16	Kalchiti	Hiraganj
16	Kalchiti	Pathargora (Bhitargora)
16	Kalchiti	Edalbera
16	Kalchiti	Chota Digha
16	Kalchiti	Upar Digha
16	Kalchiti	Dainmara
16	Kalchiti	Chapri
16	Kalchiti	Makra Kalapathar
16	Kalchiti	Murahir
16	Kalchiti	Baghmuri
16	Kalchiti	Haripur
16	Kalchiti	Dhobani
17	Jhantijharna	Shyamnagi
17	Jhantijharna	Bhumru
17	Jhantijharna	Phuljhor
17	Jhantijharna	Terapani
17	Jhantijharna	Balidih
17	Jhantijharna	Bhamradih
17	Jhantijharna	Sindriyam
17	Jhantijharna	Baliyam
17	Jhantijharna	Jhantijharna
17	Jhantijharna	Bhurisol
18	Bhadua	Makuli Jangli
18	Bhadua	Chekam
18	Bhadua	Tentlakocha
18	Bhadua	Yuktidih
18	Bhadua	Pungora
18	Bhadua	Rangabandh
18	Bhadua	Mahishduba
18	Bhadua	Bhadua
18	Bhadua	Chota Jamuna
18	Bhadua	Banskatiya
18	Bhadua	Budhraisai
18	Bhadua	Ghatiduba
18	Bhadua	Jambad
18	Bhadua	Kharsati
18	Bhadua	Khadikasol
19	Barajuri	Murakati
19	Barajuri	Raghunathpur
19	Barajuri	Baliguma
19	Barajuri	Purnapani
19	Barajuri	Soradabar
19	Barajuri	Barajuri
19	Barajuri	Salbani
20	Banki	Dubrajpur
20	Banki	Chakdoha
20	Banki	Banki
20	Banki	Birbad
20	Banki	Deoli
20	Banki	Pukhuria
20	Banki	Leda
20	Banki	Pithati
21	Karaduba	Bara Jamuna
21	Karaduba	Kalapathar
21	Karaduba	Bandhdih
21	Karaduba	Bara Dhadika
21	Karaduba	Karaduba
21	Karaduba	Gandhniya
21	Karaduba	Ballam
21	Karaduba	Kendoposi
21	Karaduba	Hullung
21	Karaduba	Kanimahuli
21	Karaduba	Burudih
22	Asna	Bardih
22	Asna	Lohamaliya
22	Asna	Chota Dhadika
22	Asna	Asna
22	Asna	Kodakocha
22	Asna	Katsol
22	Asna	Mahtam
22	Asna	Paharpur
22	Asna	Dhakpathar
22	Asna	Sirisbani
22	Asna	Dhangakamal
22	Asna	Jharbera
22	Asna	Charaigora

== Golmuri-cum-Jugsalai ==
List of villages in Golmuri-cum-Jugsalai block
Sl.	Name of panchayats	Name of villages
1	West Bagbera	Bagbera
2	North Bagbera	Bagbera
3	Central Bagbera	Bagbera
4	Bagbera colony	Bagbera
5	South Bagbera	Bagbera
6	East Bagbera	Bagbera
7	Northeast Bagbera	Bagbera
8	North Kitadih	Kitadih
9	West Kitadih	Kitadih
10	East Kitadih	Kitadih
11	South Susnigariya	Susnigariya
12	North Susnigariya	Susnigariya
13	West Kalimati	Kalimati
14	South Kalimati	Kalimati
15	North Kalimati	Kalimati
16	East Kalimati	Kalimati
17	North Sarjamda	Sarjamda
18	Central Sarjamda	Sarjamda
19	South Sarjamda	Sarjamda
20	Northwest Gadhra	Jojobera
20	Northwest Gadhra	Gadhra
21	Northeast Gadhra	Gadhra
22	Central Gadhra	Gadhra
23	South Gadhra	Gadhra
23	South Gadhra	Jaskandih
23	South Gadhra	Tupudang
24	South Haludbani	Haludbani
25	Central Haludbani	Haludbani
26	East Haludbani	Haludbani
27	West Haludbani	Haludbani
28	North Karandih	Karandih
29	South Karandih	Karandih
30	East Ghaghidih	Ghaghidih
31	North Ghaghidih	Ghaghidih
32	Central Ghaghidih	Ghaghidih
33	South Ghaghidih	Ghaghidih
34	West Ghaghidih	
34	West Ghaghidih	Ghaghidih
34	West Ghaghidih	Kacha
35	Purihasa	Purihasa
36	Keruadungri	Keruadungri
36	Keruadungri	Banduhudang
36	Keruadungri	Talsha
36	Keruadungri	Turamdih
36	Keruadungri	Bhuridih
36	Keruadungri	Bhitar Dari
36	Keruadungri	Bahar Dari
36	Keruadungri	Hakegora
36	Keruadungri	Changira
37	Bayangbil	Nandup
37	Bayangbil	Kudada
37	Bayangbil	Bayangbil
37	Bayangbil	Marchagora
37	Bayangbil	Lailam
37	Bayangbil	Kadamdih
38	Hitku	Khukradih
38	Hitku	Goradih
38	Hitku	Kadma
38	Hitku	Rugridih
38	Hitku	Hitku
38	Hitku	Kero
39	Khakripara	Khakripara
39	Khakripara	Bara Govindpur
40	South Chota Govindpur	Chota Govindpur
41	South Central Chota Govindpur	Chota Govindpur
42	West Chota Govindpur	Chota Govindpur
43	East Chota Govindpur	Chota Govindpur
44	North Chota Govindpur	Chota Govindpur
45	West Ghorabanda	Ghorabanda
46	North Ghorabanda	Ghorabanda
47	East Ghorabanda	Ghorabanda
48	Luabasa	Dhanchatani
48	Luabasa	Kesikudar
48	Luabasa	Khairbani
48	Luabasa	Luabasa
49	Hurlung	Hurlung
49	Hurlung	Nutandih
49	Hurlung	Lupungdih
49	Hurlung	Manpita
50	Deoghar	Deoghar
50	Deoghar	Jagannathpur
50	Deoghar	Turiabera
50	Deoghar	Pokhari
50	Deoghar	Edalbera
50	Deoghar	Simuldanga
50	Deoghar	Bhilaipahari
51	Palasbani	Betakocha
51	Palasbani	Palasbani
51	Palasbani	Chota Banki
51	Palasbani	Kalajhor
52	Bara Banki	Bara Banki
52	Bara Banki	Shilpahari
52	Bara Banki	Pipla
52	Bara Banki	Kamlabera
52	Bara Banki	Kustuliya
52	Bara Banki	Bhagabandh
52	Bara Banki	Gurma
53	Beko	Beko
53	Beko	Kudlung
53	Beko	Jhatipahari
53	Beko	Dalapani
53	Beko	Parasipahari
53	Beko	Indurmati
53	Beko	Golkata
53	Beko	Bhursaghutu
53	Beko	Ruhidih
53	Beko	Dobhapani
54	Belajuri	Maliyanta
54	Belajuri	Madnabera
54	Belajuri	Hirachuni
54	Belajuri	Salbani
54	Belajuri	Dhaniya
54	Belajuri	Belajuri
54	Belajuri	Narga
54	Belajuri	Barardih
54	Belajuri	Kasidih
55	Daldali	Suklara
55	Daldali	Harmadih
55	Daldali	Sirka
55	Daldali	Gobindpur
55	Daldali	Itamara
55	Daldali	Lukaikanali
55	Daldali	Koriya
55	Daldali	Banamghutu
55	Daldali	Daldali

== Gurabandha ==
List of villages in Gurbandha block
Sl.	Name of panchayats	Name of villages
1	Bhalki	Kanyaluka
1	Bhalki	Bhalki
1	Bhalki	Surangi
1	Bhalki	Namolepo
1	Bhalki	Baglata
2	Forest block	Murakati
2	Forest block	Maobhandar
2	Forest block	Asanbani
2	Forest block	Rerua
2	Forest block	Baliyaposi
2	Forest block	Nekrasoli
2	Forest block	Murathakura
2	Forest block	Dumurbandhi
2	Forest block	Khejurdari
2	Forest block	Forest block
3	Gurabanda	Gurabanda
3	Gurabanda	Hatiapata
3	Gurabanda	Gobraduma
3	Gurabanda	Khariabanda
3	Gurabanda	Kasiyabera
3	Gurabanda	Kuriyan
3	Gurabanda	Hariyan
3	Gurabanda	Maheshpur
3	Gurabanda	Jiyan
3	Gurabanda	Gura
3	Gurabanda	Muchrisol
4	Singhpura	Jaighantpur
4	Singhpura	Phulkhuta
4	Singhpura	Bhakar
4	Singhpura	Makri
4	Singhpura	Taraspur
4	Singhpura	Chaksol
4	Singhpura	Singhpura
4	Singhpura	Jualkata
4	Singhpura	Nagarapal
4	Singhpura	Dongadaha
5	Murakati	Bhudriboni
5	Murakati	Kurajujha
5	Murakati	Bautiya
5	Murakati	Tetuldanga
5	Murakati	Chuasol
5	Murakati	Paharpur
5	Murakati	Laopara
5	Murakati	Kumrasol
5	Murakati	Murakati
5	Murakati	Arjunbera
5	Murakati	Asanbani
5	Murakati	Churiapahar
5	Murakati	Ruasol
6	Balijuri	Benagariya
6	Balijuri	Naikansol
6	Balijuri	Noadih
6	Balijuri	Marotoliya
6	Balijuri	Balijuri
6	Balijuri	Hathidahar
6	Balijuri	Shankasol
6	Balijuri	Pandrapathar
6	Balijuri	Larkabasa
6	Balijuri	Berapal
6	Balijuri	Chotahathidahar
7	Angarpara	Angarpara
7	Angarpara	Jambani
7	Angarpara	Kenduapal
7	Angarpara	Kadampal
7	Angarpara	Kaispal
7	Angarpara	Punasiya
7	Angarpara	Bangram
7	Angarpara	Matiyaldih
7	Angarpara	Bankata
7	Angarpara	Pindrasol
7	Angarpara	Manda
7	Angarpara	Paharpur
7	Angarpara	Nekradungri
7	Angarpara	Kenduadih
7	Angarpara	Gorangpur
7	Angarpara	Kalapathar
7	Angarpara	Jordiha
8	Banmakri	Kema
8	Banmakri	Talpathar Para
8	Banmakri	Bhurshan
8	Banmakri	Muchiasai
8	Banmakri	Uparpathar Para
8	Banmakri	Akashchinra
8	Banmakri	Urubera
8	Banmakri	Banmakri
8	Banmakri	Swargchinra
8	Banmakri	Kasiapal
8	Banmakri	Brindabani
8	Banmakri	Subarnrekhanandi
8	Banmakri	Subarnrekhanandipal
8	Banmakri	Sonapatpal
8	Banmakri	Kariyamuhanpal

== Musabani ==
List of villages in Musabani block
Sl.	Name of panchayats	Name of villages
1	North Ichra	Ichra
2	South Ichra	Ichra
3	Matigora	Matigora
3	Matigora	Kulamara
3	Matigora	Swaspur
3	Matigora	Bara Jharnail
4	Murgaghutu	Murgaghutu
4	Murgaghutu	Royam
4	Murgaghutu	Tetuldanga
5	Terenga	Terenga
5	Terenga	Kendadih
5	Terenga	Kumirmuri
5	Terenga	Chapri
5	Terenga	Chakulia
5	Terenga	Netra
6	Forest block	Forest block
6	Forest block	Pathargora
6	Forest block	Somaidih
6	Forest block	Patkita
7	Benasol	Benasol
7	Benasol	Sohda
8	Surda	Surda
8	Surda	Tilabani
8	Surda	Upar Bandha
8	Surda	Kadamdih
8	Surda	Baruniya
9	Mediya	Mediya
9	Mediya	Sonagara
9	Mediya	Jamsol
9	Mediya	Rangamatia
9	Mediya	Laokeshra
10	East Musabani	Musabani
11	West Musabani	Musabani
12	Dhobani	Dhobani
12	Dhobani	Kakdoha
12	Dhobani	Raipahari
13	Mahulbera	Badiya
14	North Badiya	Badiya
15	South Badiya	Badiya
16	East Badiya	Badiya
17	West Badiya	
18	Kuilisuta	Kuilisuta
18	Kuilisuta	Latiya
18	Kuilisuta	Bhandarboro
18	Kuilisuta	Bhuiyaboro
18	Kuilisuta	Katsakra
18	Kuilisuta	Patnipal
19	Gohla	Gohla
19	Gohla	Bikrampur
19	Gohla	Bakra
19	Gohla	Phuljhari
19	Gohla	Bhadua
20	Parulia	Parulia
20	Parulia	Korasol
20	Parulia	Bangora
20	Parulia	Niranjan Kocha

== Patamda ==
List of villages in Patamda block
Sl.	Name of panchayats	Name of villages
1	Kamalpur	Charakpathar
1	Kamalpur	Kamalpur
1	Kamalpur	Mahalipara
1	Kamalpur	Tilabani
1	Kamalpur	Bauridih
1	Kamalpur	Sarangidih
1	Kamalpur	Jambani
2	Bangurda	Bangurda
2	Bangurda	Makula
2	Bangurda	Gopalpur
2	Bangurda	Bandh
3	Kashmar	Gengadih
3	Kashmar	Ramchandrapur
3	Kashmar	Nutandih
3	Kashmar	Kashmar
3	Kashmar	Sanjara
3	Kashmar	Kamarda
3	Kashmar	Golkata
4	Bankuchiya	Mudidih/Phuljharna
4	Bankuchiya	Hutupathar
4	Bankuchiya	Hurumbil
4	Bankuchiya	Samarjobra
4	Bankuchiya	Raherdih
4	Bankuchiya	Indatanr
4	Bankuchiya	Bankuchiya
5	Odiya	Geruwala
5	Odiya	Dandudih
5	Odiya	Kanku
5	Odiya	Odiya
6	Kumir	Kantagora
6	Kumir	Mudidih/Lekrokocha
6	Kumir	Barubera
6	Kumir	Kumir
6	Kumir	Kankidih
7	Bidra	Bidra
7	Bidra	Dogrigora
7	Bidra	Beldih
7	Bidra	Mathurapur
7	Bidra	Rakhdih
7	Bidra	Macha
7	Bidra	Jagmohanpur
8	Patamda	Aguidangra
8	Patamda	Patamda
8	Patamda	Pokhribera
8	Patamda	Rangatanr
9	Dighi	Lekro
9	Dighi	Pawanpur
9	Dighi	Dighi
9	Dighi	Jalla
9	Dighi	Lowadih
9	Dighi	Pathardih
9	Dighi	Jharbamni
10	Kheruwa	Kundrukocha
10	Kheruwa	Bamni
10	Kheruwa	Kheruwa
10	Kheruwa	Champir
10	Kheruwa	Barudih
10	Kheruwa	Dhusra
11	Gobarghusi	Bataluka
11	Gobarghusi	Sari
11	Gobarghusi	Gobarghusi
11	Gobarghusi	Opo
11	Gobarghusi	Amdapahari
11	Gobarghusi	Kukru
12	Lawa	Poklobera
12	Lawa	Lawa
12	Lawa	Garigram
12	Lawa	Nengjuri
12	Lawa	Sisda
12	Lawa	Duaridih
13	Mahulbana	Mahulbana
13	Mahulbana	Dhadkidih
13	Mahulbana	Sundarpur
13	Mahulbana	Choura
13	Mahulbana	Ghaghra
14	Lachipur	Nahchibera
14	Lachipur	Mukrudih
14	Lachipur	Lachipur
14	Lachipur	Chadrikol
14	Lachipur	Srirampur
14	Lachipur	Bantoriya
14	Lachipur	Bansgarh
14	Lachipur	Churda
15	Jorsa	Ghorabandha
15	Jorsa	Jamdih
15	Jorsa	Sarjumli
15	Jorsa	Tungburu
15	Jorsa	Jorsa
15	Jorsa	Jhunjhka

== Potka ==
List of villages in Potka block
Sl.	Name of panchayats	Name of villages
1	Tentla	Gitilata
1	Tentla	Tirildih
1	Tentla	Bara Bandua
1	Tentla	Chota Bandua
1	Tentla	Tentla
1	Tentla	Turi
2	Chandpur	Chandpur
2	Chandpur	Rajabasa
2	Chandpur	Porabhumri
2	Chandpur	Bingburu
2	Chandpur	Dholadih
2	Chandpur	Rangamatia
2	Chandpur	Hatnabera
3	Matku	Matku
3	Matku	Baredih
3	Matku	Pichli
3	Matku	Baghmara
3	Matku	Patharchakri
3	Matku	Chirugora
4	Shankarda	Kasidih
4	Shankarda	Shankarda
4	Shankarda	Damudih
4	Shankarda	Lowadih
4	Shankarda	Bhutka
4	Shankarda	Ranikudar
4	Shankarda	Swargchinra
5	Hartopa	Hartopa
5	Hartopa	Murgaghutu
6	Hathibindha	Hathibindha
6	Hathibindha	Sarsabera
6	Hathibindha	Bandhdih
6	Hathibindha	Sindurgouri
6	Hathibindha	Dorkasai
6	Hathibindha	Narayanpur
6	Hathibindha	Kokda
6	Hathibindha	Dhadkidih
7	Domjuri	Rajdoha
7	Domjuri	Dhobani
7	Domjuri	Domjuri
7	Domjuri	Khursi
8	Asanbani	Kanikola
8	Asanbani	Asanbani
8	Asanbani	Ghatiduba
8	Asanbani	Kudapal
8	Asanbani	Digarsai
8	Asanbani	Tilamura
8	Asanbani	Chatro
8	Asanbani	Khamardih
8	Asanbani	Lalmohanpur
8	Asanbani	Birgram
8	Asanbani	Birdha
9	Kuldiha	Gopalpur
9	Kuldiha	Durku
9	Kuldiha	Kuldiha
9	Kuldiha	Kalapathar
10	Bhatin	Jharia
10	Bhatin	Bhatin
10	Bhatin	Mechua
10	Bhatin	Tilaitanr
11	Dhirol	Bango
11	Dhirol	Dhirol
11	Dhirol	Roldih
11	Dhirol	Chemaijuri
11	Dhirol	Netosai
12	Sohda	Rohinibera
12	Sohda	Sohda
12	Sohda	Balijuri
12	Sohda	Patharbhanga
12	Sohda	Barghutu
12	Sohda	Sikra
12	Sohda	Bansila
12	Sohda	Rimra
12	Sohda	Arkabera
12	Sohda	Rangamatia
12	Sohda	Balipos
12	Sohda	Dudhkundi
13	Gualkata	Serengdih
13	Gualkata	Gualkata
13	Gualkata	Baliyagora
13	Gualkata	Porsa
13	Gualkata	Mohnadih
13	Gualkata	Gourgram
13	Gualkata	Butgora
13	Gualkata	Dhanguriya
13	Gualkata	Jamdih
13	Gualkata	Chandanpur
13	Gualkata	Saharjuri
13	Gualkata	Ranijhor
14	Kalikapur	Kalikapur
14	Kalikapur	Matkamdih
14	Kalikapur	Manhara
14	Kalikapur	Gitildih
14	Kalikapur	Lakragora
14	Kalikapur	Dokarsai
14	Kalikapur	Ramidih
14	Kalikapur	Pogrosai
15	Manpur	Dabanki
15	Manpur	Kamalpur
15	Manpur	Sawnadih
15	Manpur	Manpur
15	Manpur	Gobradih
16	Hensalbil	Khariasai
16	Hensalbil	Hensalbil
16	Hensalbil	Jahatu
16	Hensalbil	Chota Sigdi
16	Hensalbil	Indasai
16	Hensalbil	Kendmuri
16	Hensalbil	Bara Sigdi
17	Potka	Bara Bhumri
17	Potka	Roladih
17	Potka	Potka
17	Potka	Tangarsai
17	Potka	Bankati
17	Potka	Sarmanda
18	Sangram	Sangram
18	Sangram	Raipur
18	Sangram	Jojosai
18	Sangram	Duarsini
18	Sangram	Burudih
18	Sangram	Madansai
18	Sangram	Mukundpur
18	Sangram	Dumurdiha
18	Sangram	Chota Amda
19	Poradiha	Chanpi
19	Poradiha	Namo Khairpal
19	Poradiha	Naiksai
19	Poradiha	Danisai
19	Poradiha	Manglasai
19	Poradiha	Gurbhanga
19	Poradiha	Lakhansai
19	Poradiha	Kshtrapal
19	Poradiha	Khairpal
19	Poradiha	Sarjamdih
19	Poradiha	Pukhuria
19	Poradiha	Mudasai
19	Poradiha	Chota Poradiha
19	Poradiha	Dukurdiha
19	Poradiha	Poradiha
19	Poradiha	Dumurbera
20	Juri	Pawru
20	Juri	Juri
20	Juri	Tiring
20	Juri	Nuagram
20	Juri	Chanpidih
20	Juri	Hakai
20	Juri	Gangadihbera
21	Haldipokhar (East)	Haludpukur
22	Haldipokhar (West)	Haludpukur
23	Gangadih	Gangadih
23	Gangadih	Kendmuri
23	Gangadih	Datobera
23	Gangadih	Naga
23	Gangadih	Maghuasai
23	Gangadih	Darusai
23	Gangadih	Gomiyasai
23	Gangadih	Digarmara
23	Gangadih	Lagurasai
23	Gangadih	Dariyasai
24	Rasunchopa	Raharjuri
24	Rasunchopa	Sawnadih
24	Rasunchopa	Sarse
24	Rasunchopa	Lowadih
24	Rasunchopa	Galusingi
24	Rasunchopa	Buruhatu
24	Rasunchopa	Shanbasa
24	Rasunchopa	Rasunchopa
24	Rasunchopa	Palidih
24	Rasunchopa	Asuadih
25	Hensra	Sikarsai
25	Hensra	Juripahari
25	Hensra	Sonapos
25	Hensra	Hensra
25	Hensra	Roladih
25	Hensra	Mukundasai
25	Hensra	Kuldiha
25	Hensra	Banakata
25	Hensra	Bara Baglata
25	Hensra	Chota Baglata
26	Chakri	Patapani
26	Chakri	Nachosai
26	Chakri	Chakri
26	Chakri	Radur
26	Chakri	Kope
26	Chakri	Chota Ramgarh
26	Chakri	Bara Ramgarh
26	Chakri	Raghabdih
26	Chakri	Marangmali
26	Chakri	Porahatu
26	Chakri	Damudih
27	Tangrain	Tangrain
27	Tangrain	Jojodih
27	Tangrain	Dhurualupung
27	Tangrain	Patlupung
27	Tangrain	Bara Hariyan
27	Tangrain	Chota Hariyan
27	Tangrain	Mahuldiha
27	Tangrain	Kerasai
27	Tangrain	Kerketta
27	Tangrain	Matiyal
27	Tangrain	Shiling
27	Tangrain	Sidirsai
28	Kowali	Pariyasai
28	Kowali	Jhapan
28	Kowali	Kowali
28	Kowali	Lailam
28	Kowali	Chadradih
28	Kowali	Telenkocha
28	Kowali	Kutsuri
28	Kowali	Haridih
28	Kowali	Kasidih
28	Kowali	Pitidiri
28	Kowali	Chhatna
29	Janamdih	Barampat
29	Janamdih	Majhgaon
29	Janamdih	Mako
29	Janamdih	Tiksiring
29	Janamdih	Baredih
29	Janamdih	Janamdih
29	Janamdih	Upardiha
29	Janamdih	Sufalbhalki
29	Janamdih	Begunadih
29	Janamdih	Gorindha
29	Janamdih	Nuagram
29	Janamdih	Anandpur
29	Janamdih	Jhaliabera
29	Janamdih	Nischintpur
29	Janamdih	Bukamdih
30	Jamda	Upardeoli
30	Jamda	Haduadeoli
30	Jamda	Baradeoli
30	Jamda	Khaddeoli
30	Jamda	Ganakpata
30	Jamda	Chota Pichkabasa
30	Jamda	Bara Pichkabasa
30	Jamda	Ulansai
30	Jamda	Bhilaidih
30	Jamda	Jamda
30	Jamda	Pora Bhalki
30	Jamda	Rugrisai
30	Jamda	Panasdiha
30	Jamda	Bara Bhalki
31	Hensalamda	Amlatola
31	Hensalamda	Beldih
31	Hensalamda	Hadiramdih (Jojogora)
31	Hensalamda	Bargikocha
31	Hensalamda	Kharbandh
31	Hensalamda	Rangamatia
31	Hensalamda	Hensalamda
31	Hensalamda	Digarsai
31	Hensalamda	Porsagora
31	Hensalamda	Papragaru
31	Hensalamda	Jhagarsai
31	Hensalamda	Bara Tilaijhor
31	Hensalamda	Topgariya
31	Hensalamda	Chota Tilaijhor
31	Hensalamda	Bara Amda
31	Hensalamda	Swargdih
32	Tentlapora	Tentlapora
32	Tentlapora	Tilaidih
32	Tentlapora	Hitbasa
32	Tentlapora	Sonagora
32	Tentlapora	Jhilinggora
32	Tentlapora	Gamharkocha
32	Tentlapora	Turkudih
32	Tentlapora	Sadedih
32	Tentlapora	Daduakocha
33	Harina	Harina
33	Harina	Patisai
33	Harina	Narayanpur
33	Harina	Phuljhari
33	Harina	Kantasola
33	Harina	Mejogora
33	Harina	Atijhari
33	Harina	Bhagabera
33	Harina	Mangru
33	Harina	Kandarbalki
33	Harina	Baliyachua
33	Harina	Jambani
33	Harina	Dhadkidih
33	Harina	Udal
33	Harina	Roteda
33	Harina	Pandarsoli
34	Narda	Narda
34	Narda	Lerokocha
34	Narda	Dhengam
34	Narda	Karadkocha
34	Narda	Tulgram
34	Narda	Sindurpur
34	Narda	Kundrukocha
34	Narda	Paharpur
34	Narda	Kasiyabera
34	Narda	Babanjhari
34	Narda	Bongadungri

== See also ==
- Lists of villages in Jharkhand
