= Khandamouda =

- Village & Panchayat Office
- Location in Jharkhand, India Khandamouda (India)
- Coordinates: 22°16′51″N 86°44′19″E
- Country: India
- State: Jharkhand
- District: East Singhbhum

Population
  - Total: 600

Languages
  - Official: Hindi, Odia, Santali
- Time zone: UTC+5:30 (IST)
- PIN: 832101
- Vehicle registration: JH

Khandamouda is a village in Jharkhand, India. It has a population of nearly 4,000.

Nearby villages are Baharagora Parulia Kumardubi Panchrulia Khamar Digbarda etc.
