= Jagannathpur-Parulia =

Jagannathpur
- Village
- Location in Jharkhand, India Jagannathpur (India)
- Coordinates: 22°16′51″N 86°44′19″E
- Country: India
- State: Jharkhand
- District: west Singhbhum

Population
  - Total: 600

Languages
  - Official: Hindi, Santali
- Time zone: UTC+5:30 (IST)
- PIN: 833203
- Vehicle registration: JH

Jagannathpur is a village in Jharkhand, India. It has a population of nearly 2500.

Near by villages are Parulia and Kumardubi
