= Manusmuria =

Manusmuria Manusmuria
- Village
- Location in Jharkhand, India Manusmuria (India)
- Coordinates: 22°16′51″N 86°44′19″E
- Country: India
- State: Jharkhand
- District: East Singhbhum

Population
  - Total: 9,800

Languages
  - Official: Hindi, Bengali, Oriya
- Time zone: UTC+5:30 (IST)
- PIN: 832301
- Vehicle registration: JH

Manusmuria is a village in Jharkhand, India. It has a population of nearly 9800.

Near by places are Chakulia, Baharagora, Kumardubi, Parulia, Khanda mouda, and Jagannathpur - parulia.
