= Jaskandih =

Jaskandih Jaskandi
- Village
- Location within Golmuri-cum-Jugsalai Location within East Singhbhum
- Location within Jharkhand Location within India
- Coordinates: 22.7437875°N 86.2247344°E
- Country: India
- State: Jharkhand
- District: East Singhbhum
- Block: Golmuri-cum-Jugsalai

Area
  - Rural: 1.46 km^{2} (0.56 sq mi)
- Elevation: 156 m (512 ft)

Population (2011)
  - Rural: 1,316
  - Rural density: 901/km^{2} (2,330/sq mi)

Demographics
  - Literacy: 64.59%
  - Sex ratio: 982
- Time zone: UTC+5:30 (IST)
- Pincode: 831001
- Urbanization: 1. Rural (100.0%); 2. Urban (0.00%)
- Website: jamshedpur.nic.in

Jaskandih, also known as Jaskandi, is a village in Golmuri-cum-Jugsalai CD block in the Dhalbhum subdivision of the East Singhbhum district in the Indian state of Jharkhand. As per the 2011 census, It had a population of 1,316 people, with male population of 664 and female population of 652, and is classified as a rural area.

== Geography ==
Jaskandih is in the South Gadhra gram panchayat. It is in Jamshedpur city. It is also in Parsudih part. Sarjamda does own a part of it. Neighbouring villages include Tapudang, Kadamdih and Bayangbil.

== Demographics ==
As of 2011 census, Jaskandih has a population of 1,316 with 664 being males and 652 being females, accounting for sex ratio of 982 females per 1000 males. Child population (0-6) is 209, making up 15.88% of the population. It has 715 literate people and 601 illiterate people, making the 64.59% literacy rate, which is both lower than state average of 66.41% and nation average of 72.98%. The male literacy is 408 people (73.25%) and female literacy is 307 people (55.82%). Number of Households is 283, indicating 4.65 people per household. Number of workers is 451, and the unemployed rate is 65.73%. By the 2036, Jaskandih is expected to have a population of 1,793, indicating an increase of 36.22% from the 2011 census.

=== Castes ===
Castes in Jaskandih:
1. Scheduled castes 5 (0.38%)
2. Scheduled tribes 1,278 (97.1%)
3. Not indigenous 33 (2.51%)

Jaskandih has a scheduled castes population of 5 (0.38% of the population), scheduled tribes 1,278 (97.1%) and non indigenous 33 (2.51%).
