= Patamda =

- Town
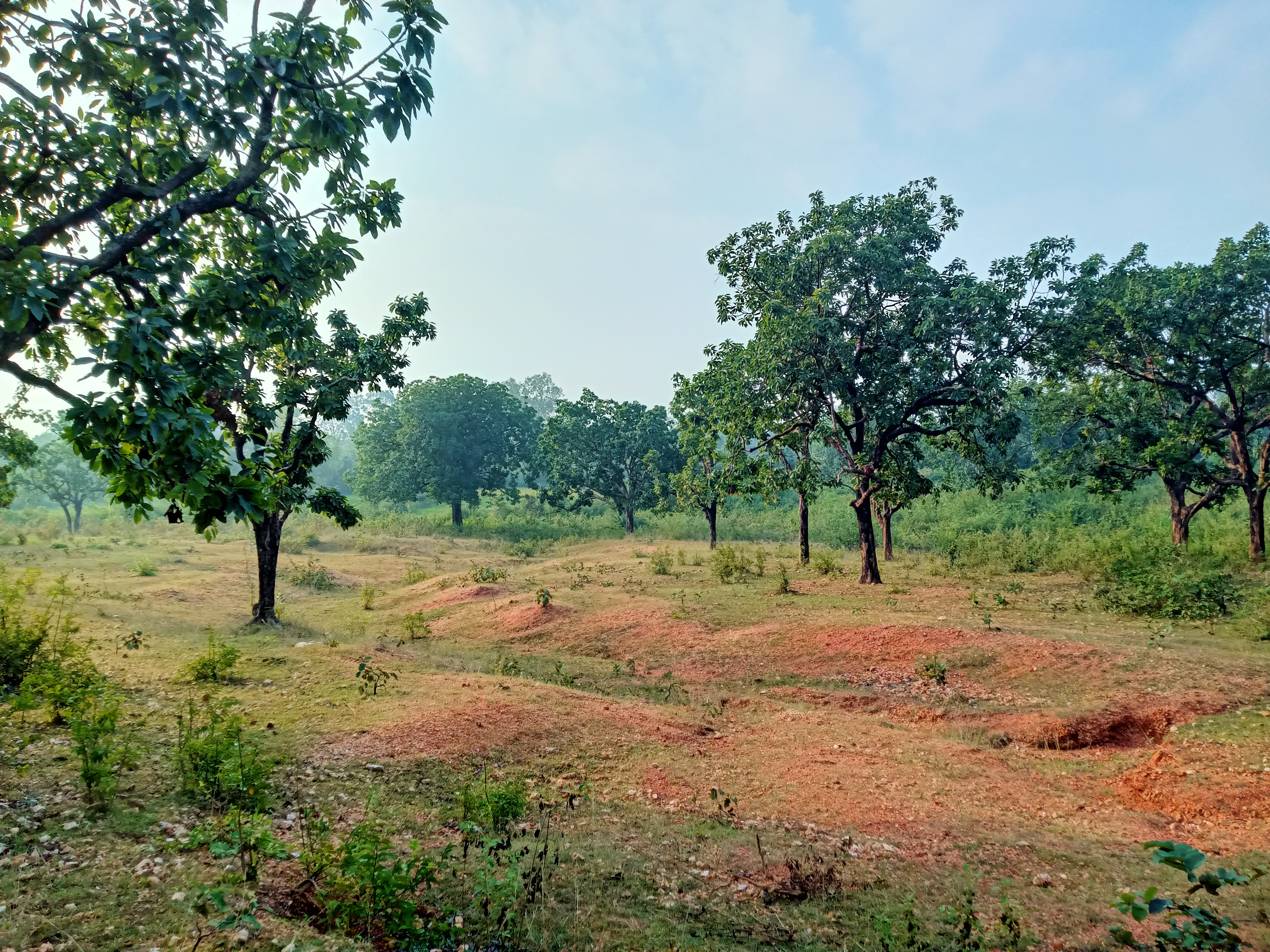
- Forest Reserve

- Location in Jharkhand, India Patamda (India)
- Coordinates: 22.9152°N 86.3858°E
- Country: India
- State: Jharkhand
- District: East Singhbhum

Government
  - Type: Federal democracy

Area
  - Total: 3.9633 km^{2} (1.5302 sq mi)
- Elevation: 278 m (912 ft)

Population (2011)
  - Total: 2,558
  - Density: 645.4/km^{2} (1,672/sq mi)

Languages *
  - Official: Hindi
  - Regional: Bengali Santali Kurmali Hindi
- Time zone: UTC+5:30 (IST)
- PIN code: 832105
- Telephone/ STD code: 0657
- Vehicle registration: JH-05
- Literacy: 66.15%
- Lok Sabha constituency: Jamshedpur
- Vidhan Sabha constituency: Jugsalai
- Website: jamshedpur.nic.in

Patamda is a small town in the Patamda CD block in the Dhalbhum subdivision of the East Singhbhum district in the Indian state of Jharkhand.

== History ==
In 1956, along with the reorganisation of the states, three police stations of Manbhum district, namely Patamda, Ichagarh and Chandil were transferred to Singhbhum district. While Patamda was added to Dhalbhum subdivision, Ichagarh and Chandil to Seraikela subdivision.

== Geography ==
Cities, towns and locations in East Singhbhum district in Kolhan Division (Locations around Jamshedpur are shown in the Jamshedpur Urban Agglomeration map - see Bagbera Colony page)
M: municipality, R: rural/ urban centre, CT: census town, T: tourist centre
Owing to space constraints in the small map, the actual locations in a larger map may vary slightly

=== Location ===
Patamda is located at 22.9152°N 86.3858°E.

=== Area overview ===
The area shown in the map "forms a part of the Chota Nagpur Plateau and is a hilly upland tract". The main rivers draining the district are the Subarnarekha and the Kharkai. The area lying between Jamshedpur and Ghatshila is the main industrial mining zone. The rest of the district is primarily depend on the agricultural sector. In the district, as of 2011, 56.9% of the population lives in the rural areas and a high 43.1% lives in the urban areas.

Note: The map alongside presents some of the notable locations in the district. All places marked in the map are linked in the larger full screen map.

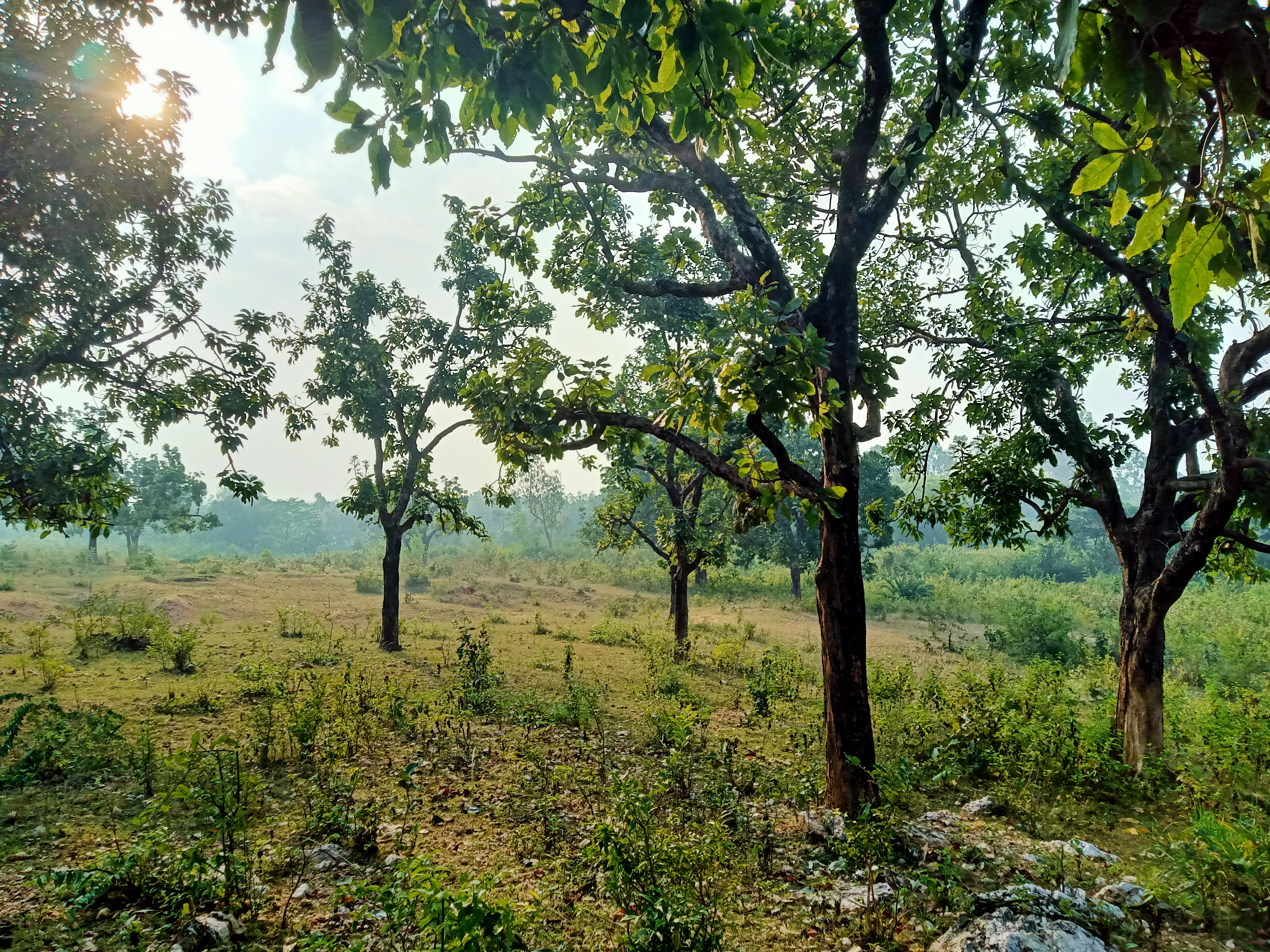

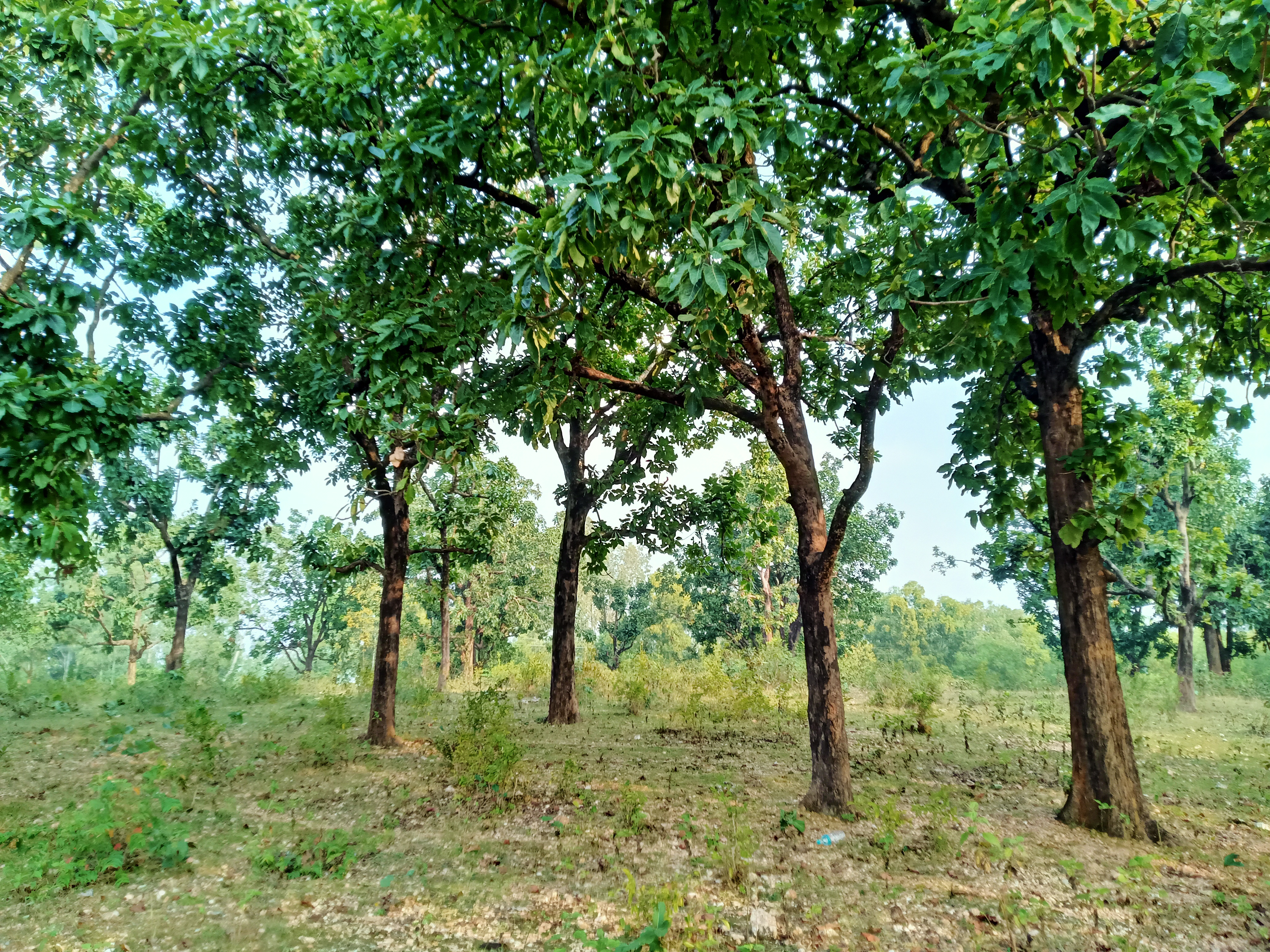

== Civic administration ==
There is a police station at Patamda.

The headquarters of the Patamda CD block is located at Patamda village.

== Demographics ==
According to the 2011 Census of India, Patamda had a total population of 2,558, of which 1,334 (52%) were males and 1,224 (48%) were females. Population in the age range 0–6 years was 381. The total number of literate persons in Patamda was 1,440 (66.15% of the population over 6 years).

(*For language details see Patamda block#Language and religion)

== Education ==
- Patamda Degree College was established in 1993. Affiliated with the Kolhan University, It has facilities for teaching Mathematics, Physics, Chemistry, Botany, Zoology, Economics, Political Science, Geography, History, Hindi, English, Bengali, Santali, Kurmali, Psychology, sociology, philosophy,, music and chhou.
- Patamda College is a Hindi-medium co-educational institution established in 1984. It has facilities for teaching in classes XI and XII. It has a playground, a library with 65,0000 books, and has 5 computers for teaching and learning purposes.
- S.S.High School Patamda is a Hindi-medium co-educational institution established in 1961. It has facilities for teaching from class IX to class XII. The school has a playground and a library with 400 books.

=== Private Schools ===
There are some Private schools in Patamda.

- South Point School, Gobarghusi Located in Gobarghusi which is 4 km from the main town. It is based on CBSE Board.
- J.E.F Public School Rangatard Patamda.

=== Government Schools ===
Government Schools are mainly funded by the government.

- Middle School Jalla a primary-secondary school starting from class 1 to 10.
- Model School Jalla
