= Parulia =

- Village
- Location in Jharkhand, India Parulia (India)
- Coordinates: 22°16′51″N 86°44′19″E
- Country: India
- State: Jharkhand
- District: East Singhbhum district

Population
  - Total: 2,500

Languages
  - Official: Bengali, Hindi, Santali
- Time zone: UTC+5:30 (IST)
- PIN: 832101
- Vehicle registration: JH

Parulia is a village in East Singhbhum district in the Indian state of Jharkhand. It consists of two separate neighborhoods, Chota Parulia and Bara Parulia. It has a population of nearly 2500. The village is located near the villages of Kumardubi and Jagannathpur.

== Festivals ==
Citizens from Parulia celebrate Laxmi Puja, Rash Purnima, Kartik Brata, Makar sankranti and Shiv Puja and Durga Puja.
